= Texas State Highway 283 =

State highway in Texas

State Highway 283
- SH 283, highlighted in red

Route information
- Maintained by TxDOT
- Length: 11.784 mi (18.965 km)
- Existed: by 1939–present

Major junctions
- West end: US 380 in Old Glory
- East end: US 277 / SH 6 in Stamford

Location
- Country: United States
- State: Texas

Highway system
- Highways in Texas; Interstate; US; State; Former; Toll; Loops; Spurs; FM/RM; Park; Rec
← US 283	→ SH 284

State Highway 283 (SH 283) is a Texas state highway that runs from U.S. Highway 380 at Old Glory southeast to U.S. Highway 277 near Stamford. This route was originally designated on September 26, 1939 from the Oklahoma state line south through Quanah, Crowell, Benjamin, and Rule to Sagerton as a renumbering of part of SH 16 (the original plan was for this to keep the SH 16 number, and SH 283 to be assigned to the Llano-Brady road). On July 31, 1975, the entire route was transferred to SH 6, while SH 283 was transferred from the old route of SH 6 from Stamford northwest to Old Glory.

== Route description ==
SH 283 begins at a junction with US 380. It heads southeast from this junction to an intersection with FM 1835. The highway continues to the southeast to an intersection with FM 1661. Heading towards the southeast, the highway continues to a junction with SH 6 . SH 283 begins to run concurrently with SH 6 until it reaches its eastern terminus at US 277 in Stamford.

== Junction list ==
County	Location	mi	km	Destinations	Notes
Stonewall				US 380	
Stonewall				FM 1835	
Haskell				FM 1661	
Haskell				SH 6	West end of SH 6 concurrency
Haskell	Stamford			US 277 / SH 6	East end of SH 6 concurrency
1.000 mi = 1.609 km; 1.000 km = 0.621 mi: Concurrency terminus
