= John Ray Godfrey =

American basketball player (1944–2024)

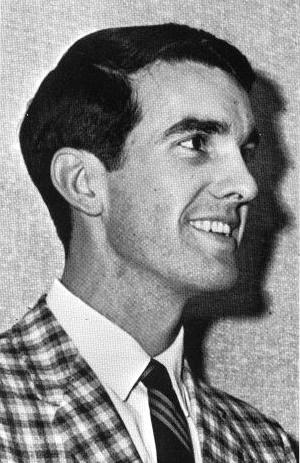
- Godfrey, c. 1968

Personal information
- Born: September 21, 1944 Aspermont, Texas, U.S.
- Died: November 17, 2024 (aged 80) Hamlin, Texas, U.S.
- Listed height: 6 ft 3 in (1.91 m)

Career information
- High school: Aspermont (Aspermont, Texas)
- College: Abilene Christian (1964–1968)
- NBA draft: 1968: 14th round, 178th overall pick
- Drafted by: Los Angeles Lakers
- Position: Shooting guard
- Coaching career: 1974–1993

Career history

Coaching
- 1974–1991: Iraan HS (girls')
- 1991–1993: Hawley HS (girls')

Career highlights
- Second-team Division II All-American (1967); Third-team Division II All-American (1968); Southland Player of the Year (1968); 3× All-Southland (1966–1968); No. 14 retired by Abilene Christian Wildcats
- Stats at Basketball Reference

John Ray Godfrey (September 21, 1944 – November 17, 2024) was an American basketball player. He played college basketball for the Abilene Christian Wildcats and was selected as the Southland Conference Player of the Year in 1968. Godfrey's number 14 was the first jersey number retired by the Wildcats. He did not play professionally and instead worked as a high school coach and administrator.

== Basketball career ==
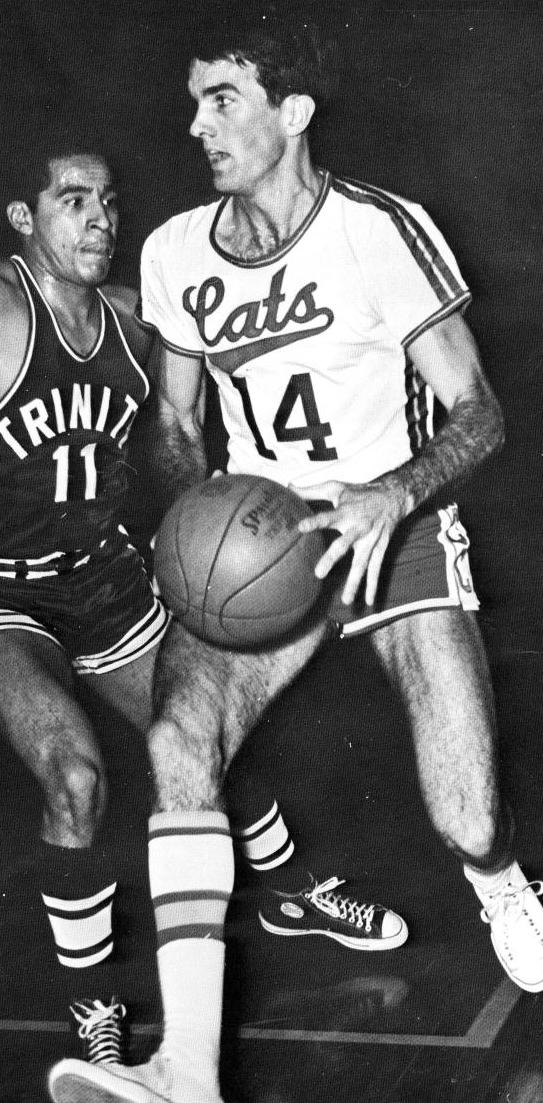
Godfrey with the Wildcats during the 1967–68 season

Godfrey was born in Aspermont, Texas, on September 21, 1944, to parents Olen Byron and Ina Mae (née McNutt) Godfrey. He lived on a farm where he began playing basketball as a child by using a goal erected on his family's garage.

Godfrey attended Aspermont High School in Aspermont. He played on the basketball team where he was coached by his brother-in-law, William Teel. Godfrey also participated in track.

Godfrey played for the Abilene Christian Wildcats from 1964 to 1968 as a shooting guard. Godfrey was selected as a member of the second-team Division II All-American team in 1967 and the third-team in 1968. He was awarded as the Southland Player of the Year in 1968 and was a three-time member of the All-Southland Conference team. Godfrey scored 1,467 points during his Wildcats career and ranks 11th in program history.

Godfrey was selected as the 178th overall pick of the 1968 NBA draft by the Los Angeles Lakers. He was also selected by the Houston Mavericks in the first round of the 1968 American Basketball Association (ABA) draft. On July 3, 1968, Godfrey signed with the Mavericks, but he returned home to become a teacher. He was invited to a tryout with the United States basketball team for the 1968 Summer Olympics.

Godfrey was inducted into the Abilene Christian University Sports Hall of Fame in 1989 and the Big Country Athletic Hall of Fame in 2011. His number 14 was retired by the Wildcats men's basketball team in 2018 as the first jersey number retirement by the program.

== Later life ==
Godfrey worked as a high school coach and administrator for 35 years.

Godfrey was the head coach of the girls' basketball team at Iraan High School for 17 years and compiled a record of 364–185. In 1991, he was appointed as head coach of the girls' team at Hawley High School. Godfrey was named as principal of Hawley Elementary School in 1993 and then promoted to superintendent in 1995. He left the position in 2002 to become an elementary principal in the Aspermont Independent School District. Godfrey was promoted to district superintendent in 2003.

== Personal life and death ==
Godfrey married his high school classmate, Barbara Smith, in 1962. They had two children.

Godfrey died in Hamlin, Texas, on November 17, 2024, at the age of 80. He was predeceased by his daughter.

== Career statistics ==
Legend
GP	Games played	GS	Games started	MPG	Minutes per game
FG%	Field goal percentage	3P%	3-point field goal percentage	FT%	Free throw percentage
RPG	Rebounds per game	APG	Assists per game	SPG	Steals per game
BPG	Blocks per game	PPG	Points per game	**Bold**	Career high

=== College ===
Year	Team	GP	GS	MPG	FG%	3P%	FT%	RPG	APG	SPG	BPG	PPG
1964–65	Abilene Christian	19	–	–	**.635**	–	**.813**	1.7	–	–	–	9.2
1965–66	Abilene Christian	**28**	–	–	.496	–	.697	3.4	–	–	–	12.1
1966–67	Abilene Christian	22	–	–	.463	–	.797	4.5	–	–	–	17.5
1967–68	Abilene Christian	24	–	–	.515	–	.685	**4.7**	–	–	–	**23.8**
Career		93	–	–	.506	–	.733	3.6	–	–	–	15.8
