= U.S. Route 380 =

Highway in the United States

U.S. Route 380
- US 380 highlighted in red

Route information
- Auxiliary route of US 80
- Maintained by NMDOT and TxDOT
- Length: 673 mi (1,083 km)
- Existed: 1931–present
- History: 1926–1931: US 566

Major junctions
- West end: I-25 / US 85 in San Antonio, NM
- US 54 in Carrizozo, NM; US 70 in Roswell, NM; US 285 in Roswell, NM; US 87 in Tahoka, TX; US 281 in Jacksboro, TX; US 81 / US 287 in Decatur, TX; I-35 in Denton, TX; US 77 / US 377 in Denton, TX; Dallas North Tollway in Frisco, TX; US 75 in McKinney, TX
- East end: I-30 / US 67 / US 69 in Greenville, TX

Location
- Country: United States
- States: New Mexico, Texas

Highway system
- United States Numbered Highway System; List; Special; Divided

U.S. Route 380 (US 380) is an east–west United States highway. The highway's eastern terminus is in Greenville, Texas, at an intersection with Interstate 30, of which the easternmost 3–4 miles are concurrent with US 69 in a loop around the west and south sides of Greenville. Its western terminus is at San Antonio, New Mexico, south of Socorro, at an intersection with Interstate 25. It intersected with its parent, U.S. Route 80, at Cisco until 1971, when it was rerouted along the former SH 24 from that highway's western terminus near Old Glory to Greenville. Former U.S. Route 380 from Cisco to near Old Glory became an extension of SH 6. The highway no longer connects to any x80 route. US 380 passes through some of the far northern suburbs of the Dallas/Fort Worth Metroplex, including (from west to east) Denton, Little Elm, Frisco, Prosper, McKinney and Princeton. The portion in Texas from the New Mexico state line to Jayton was SH 84 before 1939. Its spur, SH 84A, went from Jayton to Aspermont until 1930, when it became SH 161.

== Route description ==
=== New Mexico ===
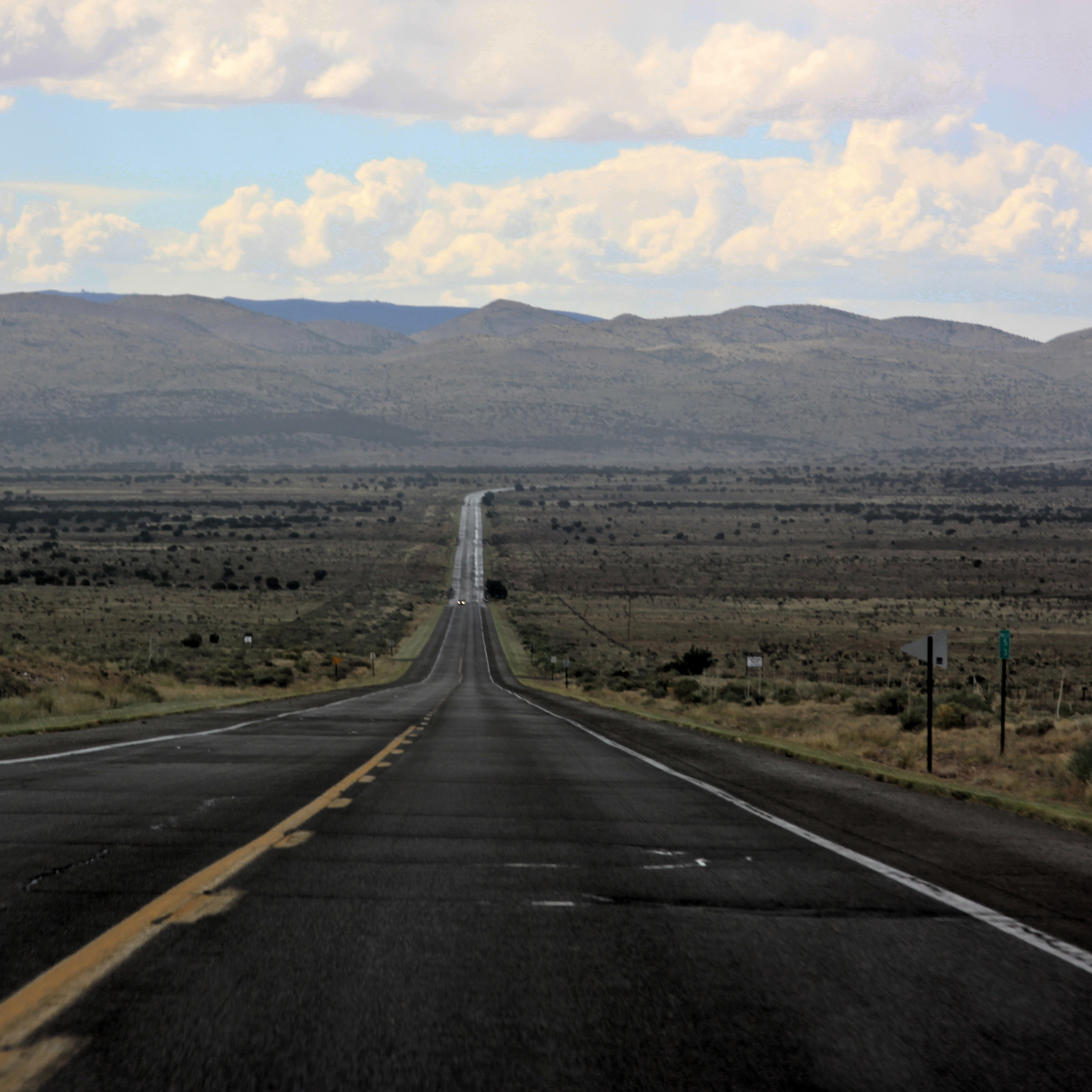
US-380

US Route 380 begins at an intersection with Interstate 25 just west of San Antonio, New Mexico, and travels through town, meeting the old route of US 85, now New Mexico State Road 1. It then travels generally east, and marks the northern edge of the White Sands Missile Range. The road then turns southeast, crossing the Carrizozo Malpais before reaching Carrizozo, meeting U.S. Route 54. The route continues southeast, climbing the Sacramento Mountains, and going through the town of Capitan and briefly travelling through the Lincoln National Forest, before reaching U.S. Route 70 at Hondo and becoming concurrent with US 70.

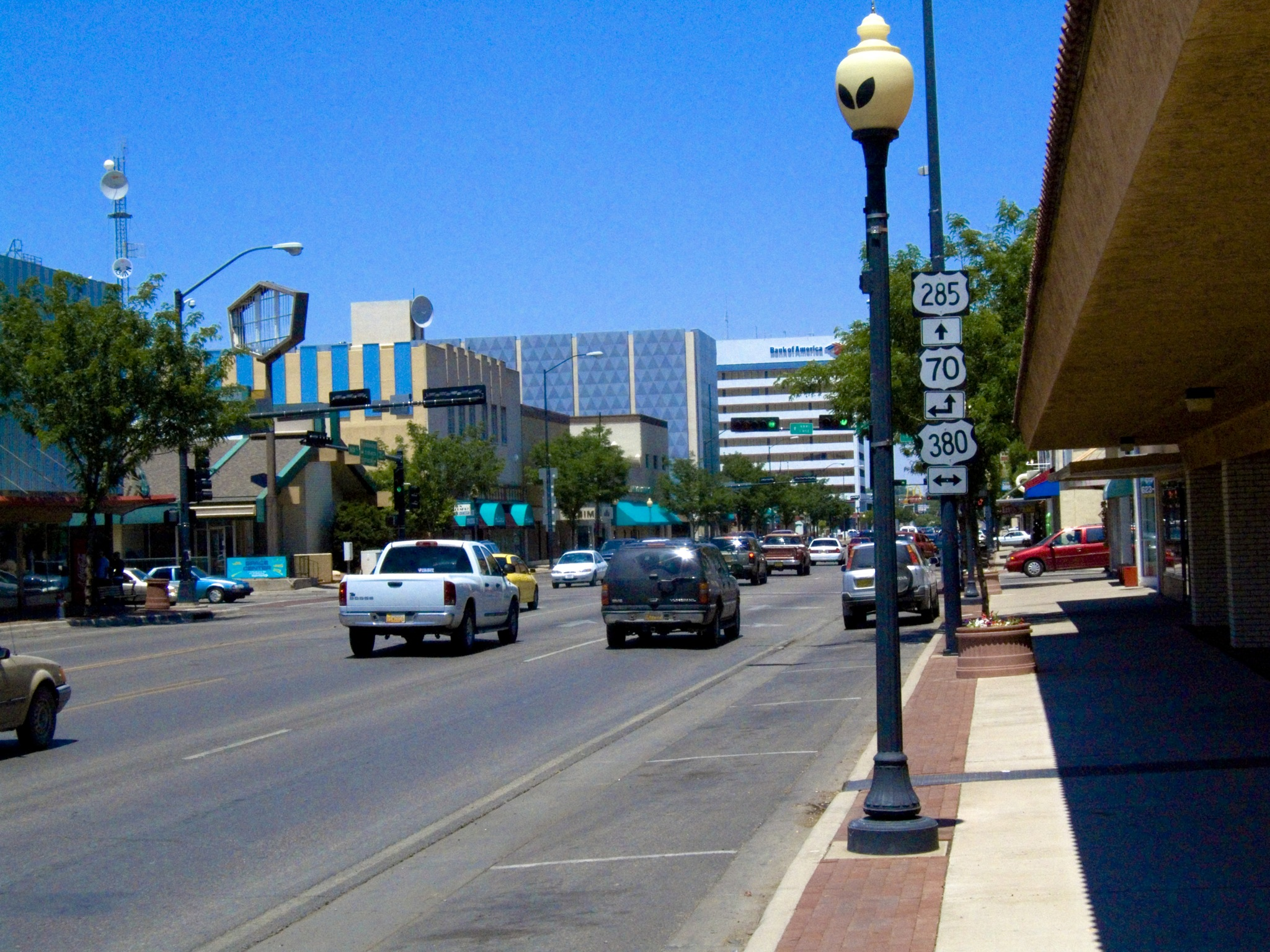
US 380 at the intersection of US 70 and US 285 in Roswell

These routes continue eastward, next reaching Roswell, New Mexico. US 380 splits with US 70 in Roswell, then crossing U.S. Route 285 in Roswell before continuing east across oil-producing areas of the Llano Estacado of east New Mexico and the Texas South Plains.

=== Texas ===
US 380 enters Texas at a crossing with Farm to Market Road 769, travelling generally due east before meeting up with US Route 82 in Plains. They continue east passing the former locations of Tokio and Gomez before reaching Brownfield. In Brownfield, it meets US Routes 62 and 385, and all 4 routes coincide for 3 blocks through the center of town before US 380 splits to the east.

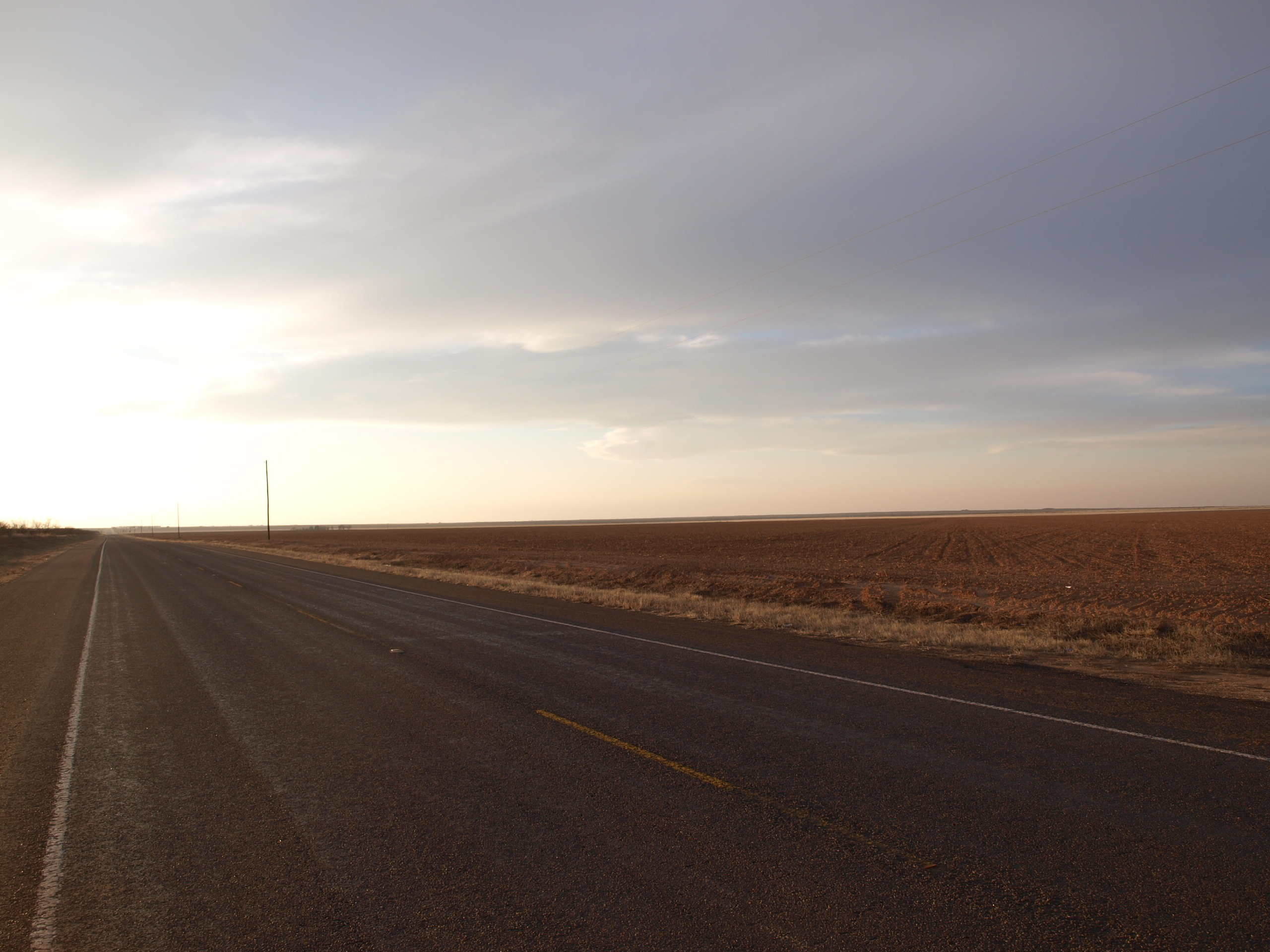
US 380 west of Tahoka, Texas

The route continues due east through Texas South Plains farmland, passing through Tahoka, before falling off the Llano Estacado and reaching Post. The highway then meanders east through rural Garza and Kent Counties before reaching the ghost town of Clairemont. The route then travels east, where it meets Texas State Highway 70, which both then turn northeast until reaching Jayton, where US 380 takes a sharp turn back to the southeast. The road then travels through several thousand acres of private ranchland in Kent and Stonewall Counties before reaching Swenson.

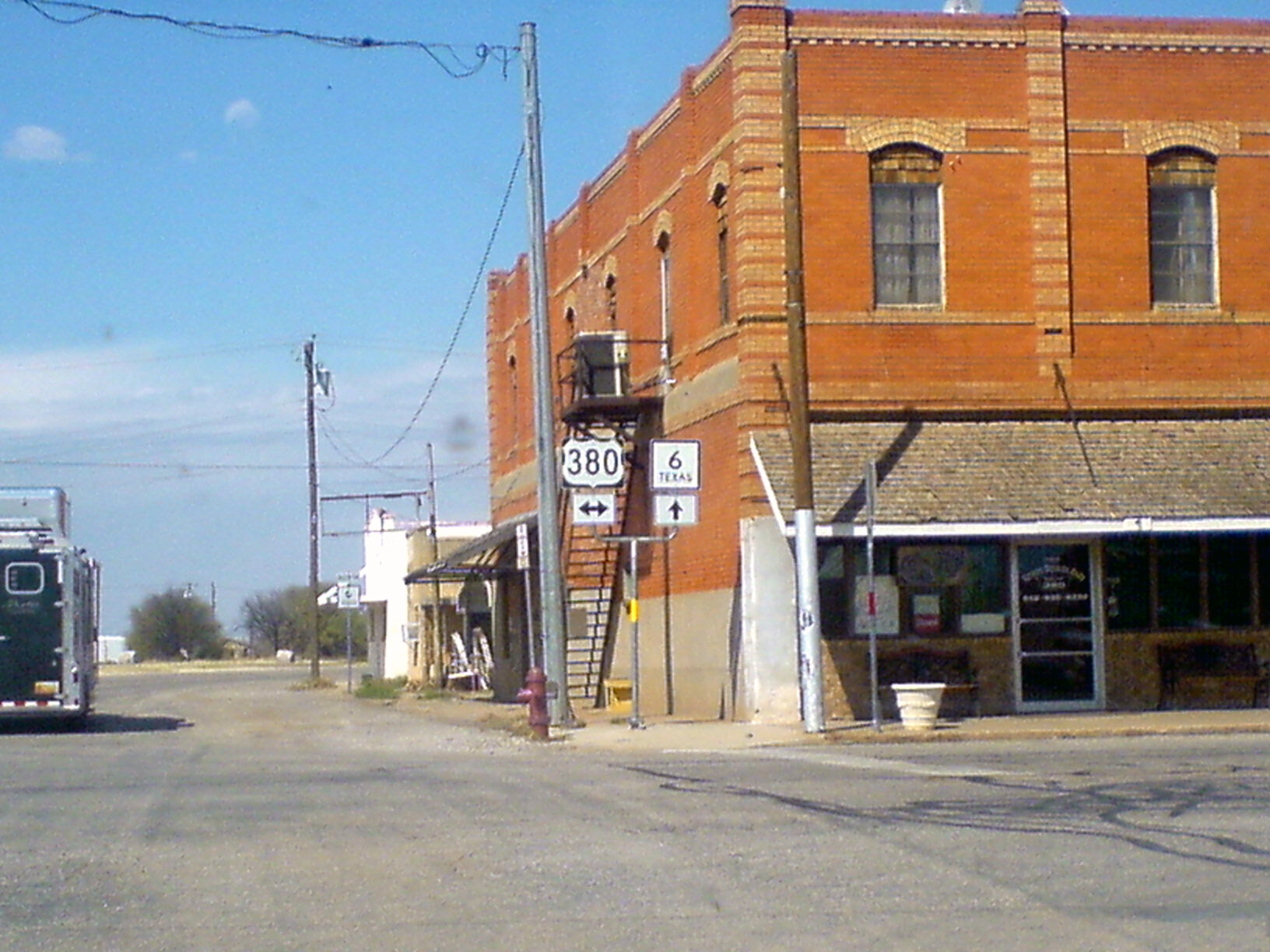
US 380 in Rule, Texas

The route continues to the southeast, reaching an intersection with US 83, where both continue southeast into the town of Aspermont. The route continues to the east and northeast through the communities of Old Glory, Rule, Haskell, Throckmorton, and Newcastle, before crossing Lake Graham and reaching the city of Graham.

US 380 continues to the east and northeast through Bryson before reaching an intersection with US Route 281 and Texas State Highway 114 in Jacksboro. US 281 departs southward out of town, while US 380 and TX 114 depart east south of Jacksboro, crossing Lake Bridgeport before reaching the city of Bridgeport. US 380 then travels due east toward the city of Decatur.

US 380 exits to the east and reaches an intersection with Interstate 35 on the west end of Denton where it is known as University Drive. US 380 continues through the city of Denton, intersecting US Route 77 and US 377 near Texas Woman's University, before continuing east with US 377. The routes cross the very northern edge of Lake Lewisville before US 377 departs off to the north. US 380 continues east through the town of Cross Roads and the city of Little Elm. Then US380 meets the northern terminus of the Dallas North Tollway in Frisco, before reaching McKinney, where it is also known as University Drive. The route then continues east, passing through Princeton before crossing the northern fringe of Lake Lavon, and reaching Farmersville, where it is signed as the Audie Murphy Parkway. The route again continues east, passing just south of Floyd, before reaching an intersection with US Route 69 on the far western edge of Greenville. Both of those routes then follow a loop around the south end of Greenville, before reaching the routes eastern terminus at an intersection with Interstate 30 and US Route 67.

== Special routes ==
The route has two special routes, both business routes in Texas.

=== U.S. Route 380 Business - F ===
This is the former route of US 380 through the city of Decatur. The route was bypassed in 1987, with the old route being renamed Texas State Highway Loop 569. The route was re-designated as the business route in 1991.

=== U.S. Route 380 Business - J ===
This is the former route of US 380 through the town of Floyd. The route was bypassed in 1968, when the route was still known as Texas State Highway 24, with the old routing being designated as Texas State Highway Loop 462. The route was re-designated as the business route in 1991.

== History ==
U.S. Highway 566
- Location: Ruidoso, New Mexico–Socorro, New Mexico
- Existed: 1926–1931

When US 380 was commissioned in 1931, it took over the entire former route of U.S. Route 566, an original 1926 route. The entire route of US 566 was within the state of New Mexico, from an intersection with (modern day New Mexico State Road 48) and (modern-day US 70) east of Ruidoso to US 85 (originally planned as US 466) in Socorro, New Mexico. US 566 never intersected with its nominal parent, U.S. Route 66 although it temporarily connected to that parent indirectly via U.S. Route 366.

The section of highway from the New Mexico state line to Jayton was previously SH 84. A spur route, SH 84A, went from Jayton to Aspermont, being changed to Texas State Highway 161 in 1930.
US 380 east of Denton, and west of McKinney, has had numerous fatal vehicle accidents, per public statements by law enforcement and fire department officials. This is believed to be attributed by the lack of a center median, high traffic volume, and excessive speeds.

== Major intersections ==
State	County	Location	mi	km	Destinations	Notes
New Mexico	Socorro				I-25 (US 85) – Las Cruces, Socorro	Western terminus; I-25 exit 139
New Mexico	Socorro	San Antonio			NM 1 – Luis Lopez, El Camino Real IHC, Bosque del Apache National Wildlife Refuge, Fort Craig	
New Mexico	Socorro				NM 525 south	
New Mexico	Lincoln	Carrizozo			US 54 – Vaughn, Tularosa	
New Mexico	Lincoln				NM 37 – Nogal, Ruidoso	
New Mexico	Lincoln	Capitan			NM 48 south (South Lincoln Avenue) / NM 246 (Pine Lodge Road) – Ruidoso	
New Mexico	Lincoln				NM 220 – Fort Stanton, Sierra Blanca Regional Airport, Fort Stanton Museum	
New Mexico	Lincoln	Hondo			US 70 west – Ruidoso	West end of US 70 overlap
New Mexico	Lincoln	Tinnie			NM 368 – Arabela	
New Mexico	Chaves	Roswell			US 70 Truck east / US 285 Truck (Relief Route) – Roswell International Air Center	
New Mexico	Chaves	Roswell			US 70 east / US 285 (Main Street) – Vaughn, Artesia, NMMI	East end of US 70 overlap
New Mexico	Chaves				NM 254 – East Grand Plains	
New Mexico	Chaves				NM 409 – Bottomless Lakes State Park	
New Mexico	Chaves				NM 172 – Maljamar	
New Mexico	Lea				NM 457 south to US 82 – Artesia	
New Mexico	Lea	Tatum			NM 206 – Portales, Lovington	
New Mexico	Lea				NM 125 – Bledsoe	
New Mexico–Texas line	Lea–Yoakum county line				FM 769	
Texas	Yoakum	Plains			US 82 west – Lovington	West end of US 82 overlap
Texas	See US 82					
Texas	Terry	Brownfield			US 62 east / US 82 east / US 385 north (North Lubbock Highway) – Lubbock	East end of US 62 / US 82 / US 385 overlap
Texas	Terry				FM 168 north	West end of FM 168 overlap
Texas	Terry				FM 168 south	East end of FM 168 overlap
Texas	Lynn	West Point			FM 179 – Wolfforth, Lamesa	
Texas	Lynn				FM 1328 north	
Texas	Lynn				FM 3112 south	
Texas	Lynn	Tahoka			Loop 472 (North Main Street)	
Texas	Lynn	Tahoka			US 87	Interchange
Texas	Lynn				FM 2956 south	
Texas	Lynn				FM 1054 north	West end of FM 1054 overlap
Texas	Lynn				FM 1054 south – Draw	East end of FM 1054 overlap
Texas	Lynn				FM 212	
Texas	Garza				FM 399 north	West end of FM 399 overlap
Texas	Garza				FM 399 south	East end of FM 399 overlap
Texas	Garza	Post			FM 669 south (Avenue M) – Gail	
Texas	Garza	Post			US 84 east (Avenue J) – Snyder	West end of US 84 overlap
Texas	Garza	Post			US 84 west (Avenue J) – Lubbock	East end of US 84 overlap
Texas	Garza	Post			SH 207 north / Loop 46 south / FM 651 north (Avenue F)	
Texas	Garza				FM 2008 north	
Texas	Kent				FM 1081 north	
Texas	Kent				SH 208 south – Snyder	West end of SH 208 overlap
Texas	Kent	Clairemont			SH 208 north – Spur	East end of SH 208 overlap
Texas	Kent				SH 70 south – Rotan	West end of SH 70 overlap
Texas	Kent				FM 1083 north	
Texas	Kent				SH 70 north – Jayton, Spur	East end of SH 70 overlap
Texas	Stonewall				FM 2211 east – Peacock	
Texas	Stonewall	Swenson			FM 1416 north	
Texas	Stonewall				US 83 north – Guthrie	West end of US 83 overlap
Texas	Stonewall	Aspermont			FM 1263 north (North Second Street)	
Texas	Stonewall	Aspermont			US 83 south / FM 610 west – Hamlin, Rotan	East end of US 83 overlap
Texas	Stonewall	Aspermont			FM 3457 north	
Texas	Stonewall				SH 283 east – Stamford, Sagerton	
Texas	Stonewall	Old Glory			Loop 128 east – Old Glory	
Texas	Stonewall	Old Glory			FM 1835	
Texas	Stonewall	Old Glory			Loop 128 west – Old Glory	
Texas	Haskell	Rule			FM 617 east	
Texas	Haskell	Rule			SH 6 – Rochester, Stamford	
Texas	Haskell				FM 2407 west	
Texas	Haskell	Haskell			Bus. US 277 – Weinert, Stamford	
Texas	Haskell	Haskell			US 277 – Weinert, Stamford	Interchange
Texas	Haskell	Haskell			FM 600 south – Paint Creek	
Texas	Haskell				FM 618 south – Paint Creek, Lake Stamford	
Texas	Haskell				FM 266 north	
Texas	Throckmorton				SH 222 north – Munday	
Texas	Throckmorton				FM 2651 north	
Texas	Throckmorton				FM 923 south	
Texas	Throckmorton	Throckmorton			US 183 / US 283 / SH 79 north – Seymour, Albany, Breckenridge	Access to Throckmorton County Memorial Hospital
Texas	Throckmorton				FM 1711 north – Elbert	
Texas	Young				FM 578 north to SH 79	West end of FM 578 overlap
Texas	Young				FM 578 south – Breckenridge	East end of FM 578 overlap
Texas	Young				FM 61 east – Fort Belknap	
Texas	Young	Newcastle			FM 926 west to SH 251 – Olney	
Texas	Young				FM 1769 north – Jean	
Texas	Young	Graham			SH 16 north	West end of SH 16 overlap
Texas	Young	Graham			SH 16 south (Elm Street) / SH 67 south	East end of SH 16 overlap
Texas	Young	Graham			FM 3491 north (Cliff Drive)	
Texas	Young	Graham			FM 2179 south	
Texas	Young				FM 2075 west	
Texas	Jack	Bryson			FM 3209 south	
Texas	Jack	Bryson			FM 1191 south	West end of FM 1191 overlap
Texas	Jack	Bryson			FM 1191 north – Jermyn	East end of FM 1191 overlap
Texas	Jack				FM 4 south – Graford	
Texas	Jack	Jacksboro			US 281 north / SH 114 west (Main Street) / SH 59 north (Belknap Street)	West end of US 281 / SH 114 / SH 199 overlap; Access to Faith Community Hospital
Texas	Jack	Jacksboro			PR 61 – Fort Richardson State Park	
Texas	Jack				US 281 south / SH 199 east – Mineral Wells, Fort Worth	East end of US 281 / SH 199 overlap
Texas	Jack				FM 1156 north – Wizard Wells	
Texas	Jack	Vineyard			FM 1156 – Wizard Wells, Joplin	
Texas	Wise	Bridgeport			FM 1658 north	
Texas	Wise	Bridgeport			FM 1658 – Bridgeport	
Texas	Wise	Bridgeport			SH 114 east / SH 101 north – Rhome	East end of SH 114 overlap
Texas	Wise	Bridgeport			Loop 373 – Bridgeport	
Texas	Wise				FM 1655 north – Alvord, Weatherford College	
Texas	Wise	Decatur			Bus. US 380 east to FM 51 south – Decatur	
Texas	Wise	Decatur			US 81 / US 287 – Wichita Falls, Fort Worth	Interchange
Texas	Wise	Decatur			FM 730 – Decatur Airport	Interchange
Texas	Wise	Decatur			FM 51 – Gainesville, Weatherford	Interchange
Texas	Wise	Decatur			Bus. US 380 west	
Texas	Denton				FM 2622 south – Stony	
Texas	Denton				FM 156 – Krum, Ponder, Fort Worth	Interchange
Texas	Denton	Denton			I-35 / US 380 Truck – Gainesville, Dallas	I-35 exit 469
Texas	Denton	Denton			US 77 south / US 377 south (North Elm Street)	West end of US 377 south overlap (westbound)
Texas	Denton	Denton			US 77 north (North Locust Street) to FM 428	West end of US 377 north overlap (eastbound)
Texas	Denton	Denton			Loop 288 / US 380 Truck west	Interchange
Texas	Denton	Cross Roads			US 377 north – Pilot Point	Interchange; east end of US 377 overlap
Texas	Denton	Cross Roads			FM 424 north – Aubrey	
Texas	Denton	Lincoln Park			FM 720 east – Oak Point, Little Elm	
Texas	Denton	Providence Village–Little Elm line			FM 2931 north – Providence Village	
Texas	Denton	Little Elm–Prosper line			FM 1385 north	
Texas	Denton	Frisco–Prosper line			FM 423 south – Frisco, Little Elm, The Colony	
Texas	Collin	Frisco–Prosper line			To Dallas Parkway south / Dallas North Tollway	
Texas	Collin	Frisco–Prosper line			SH 289 (Preston Road) / Bus. SH 289 north – Prosper, Frisco	Interchange
Texas	Collin	Prosper–McKinney line			FM 2478 (Custer Road) – Prosper, McKinney, Plano	
Texas	Collin	McKinney			To Lake Forest Drive / FM 1461	
Texas	Collin	McKinney			US 75 / SH 121 (North Central Expressway) – Sherman, Dallas	US 75 exit 41
Texas	Collin	McKinney			SH 5 (McDonald Street) – Melissa, Fairview	
Texas	Collin	McKinney			FM 1827 north – New Hope	
Texas	Collin	Princeton			FM 982 south	
Texas	Collin	Princeton			FM 75 north (South 4th Street)	
Texas	Collin	Farmersville			SH 78 – Lavon, Blue Ridge	Interchange
Texas	Collin	Farmersville			Main Street	Interchange
Texas	Collin				FM 547 south – Josephine	
Texas	Hunt				FM 36 north – Merit	West end of FM 36 overlap
Texas	Hunt				Bus. US 380 east	
Texas	Hunt				FM 36 south / County Road 1118 – Floyd, Caddo Mills	East end of FM 36 overlap
Texas	Hunt				Bus. US 380 west	
Texas	Hunt				FM 903 north – Wagner	
Texas	Hunt	Greenville			US 69 north / Spur 302 east – Greenville, Denison	West end of US 69 overlap
Texas	Hunt	Greenville			SH 66 west – Caddo Mills	
Texas	Hunt	Greenville			SH 34 (Wesley Street) – Greenville, Terrell	
Texas	Hunt	Greenville			I-30 / US 67 / US 69 south – Emory, Texarkana, Dallas	Eastern terminus; east end of US 69 overlap; I-30 exit 94
1.000 mi = 1.609 km; 1.000 km = 0.621 mi

== See also ==
=== Related routes ===
- U.S. Route 80
- U.S. Route 180
- U.S. Route 280

Browse numbered routes
← US 377	TX	→ US 385
