= Swenson, Texas =

Swenson
- Unincorporated community
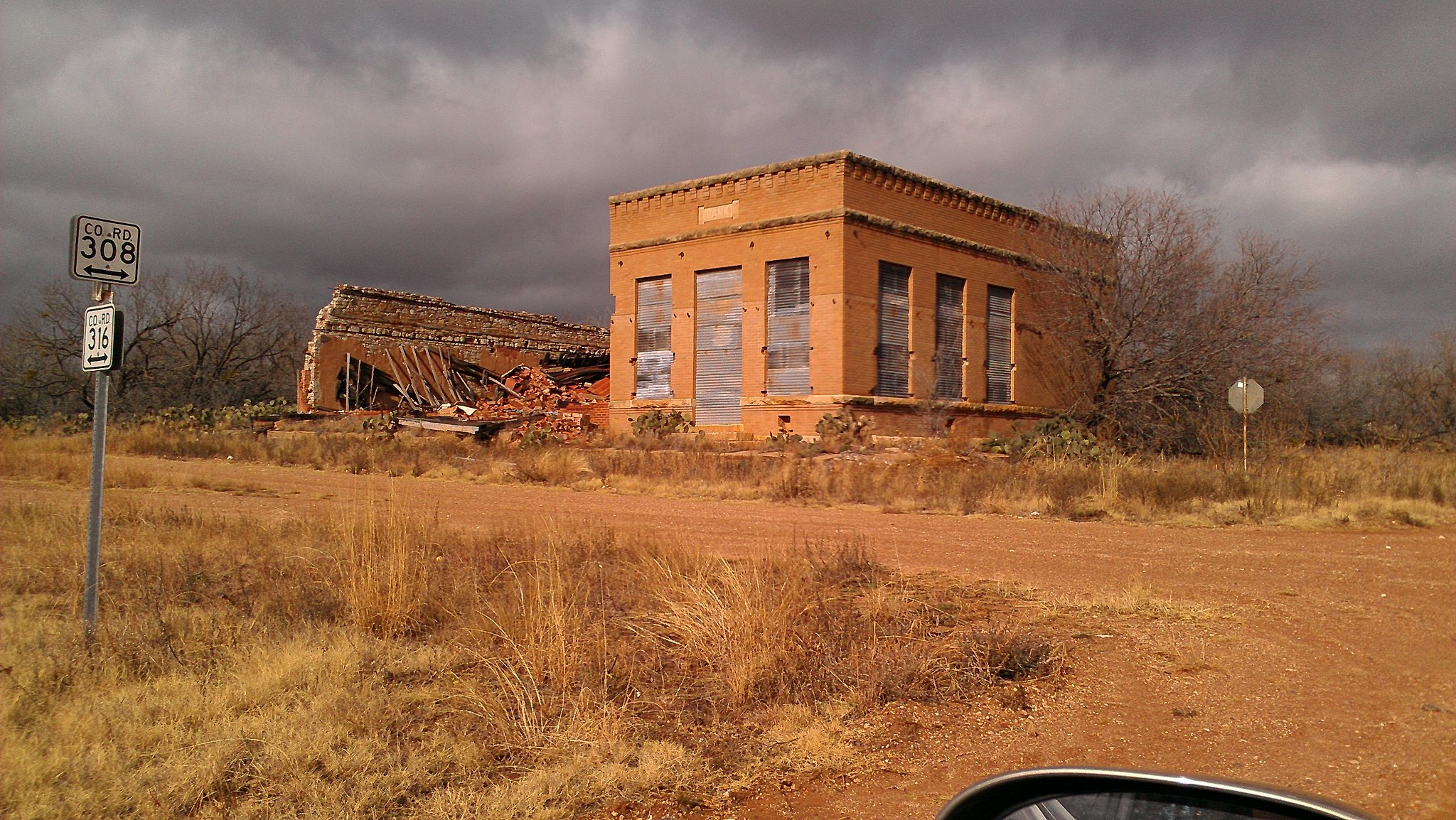
- Abandoned bank

- Location within the state of Texas Swenson (the United States)
- Coordinates: 33°12′25″N 100°18′43″W
- Country: United States
- State: Texas
- County: Stonewall
- Elevation: 1,778 ft (542 m)
- Time zone: UTC-6 (Central (CST))
  - Summer (DST): UTC-5 (CDT)
- GNIS feature ID: 1369480

Swenson is an unincorporated community in Stonewall County, Texas, United States. It is located immediately east of the junction of U.S. Highway 380 and FM 1646 in west-central Stonewall County. According to the Handbook of Texas, the community had an estimated population of 185 in 2000.

Public education in the community of Swenson is provided by the Aspermont Independent School District.
