= Rule High School (Texas) =

Location
- 1100 Union Avenue; Rule, Texas 79547-0307; United States; 33.178756°N 99.894530°W

Information
- School type: Public high school
- School district: Rule Independent School District
- Superintendent: Brad Jones
- Principal: Ken Frazier
- Staff: 15.00 (FTE)
- Grades: PK-12
- Enrollment: 122 (2018–19)
- Student to teacher ratio: 8.13
- Colors: Royal blue and white
- Athletics conference: UIL Class A
- Mascot: Bobcat
- Website: Rule High School

Rule High School or Rule School is a public high school located in Rule, Texas (USA). It is part of the Rule Independent School District located in western Haskell County and classified as a 1A school by the UIL. In 2013, the school was rated "Met Standard" by the Texas Education Agency.

== Athletics ==
The Rule Bobcats compete in the following sports:

- Basketball
- Cross Country
- 6-Man Football
- Tennis
- Track and Field

=== State Titles ===
- Boys Track
  - 1971(B), 1973(B), 1974(B), 2007(1A), 2008(1A)
- One Act Play
  - 1995(1A)

==== State Finalists ====
- Football
  - 1973(B), 2006(6M/D1), 2007(6M/D1)

== Academics ==
- UIL Academic Meet Champions
  - 1996(1A), 1997(1A)

== Notable Alumnus ==
Art Briles - is an American football coach and former player. He is the former head football coach at Baylor University.

== See also ==
- List of high schools in Texas
