= Peacock, Texas =

- Unincorporated community
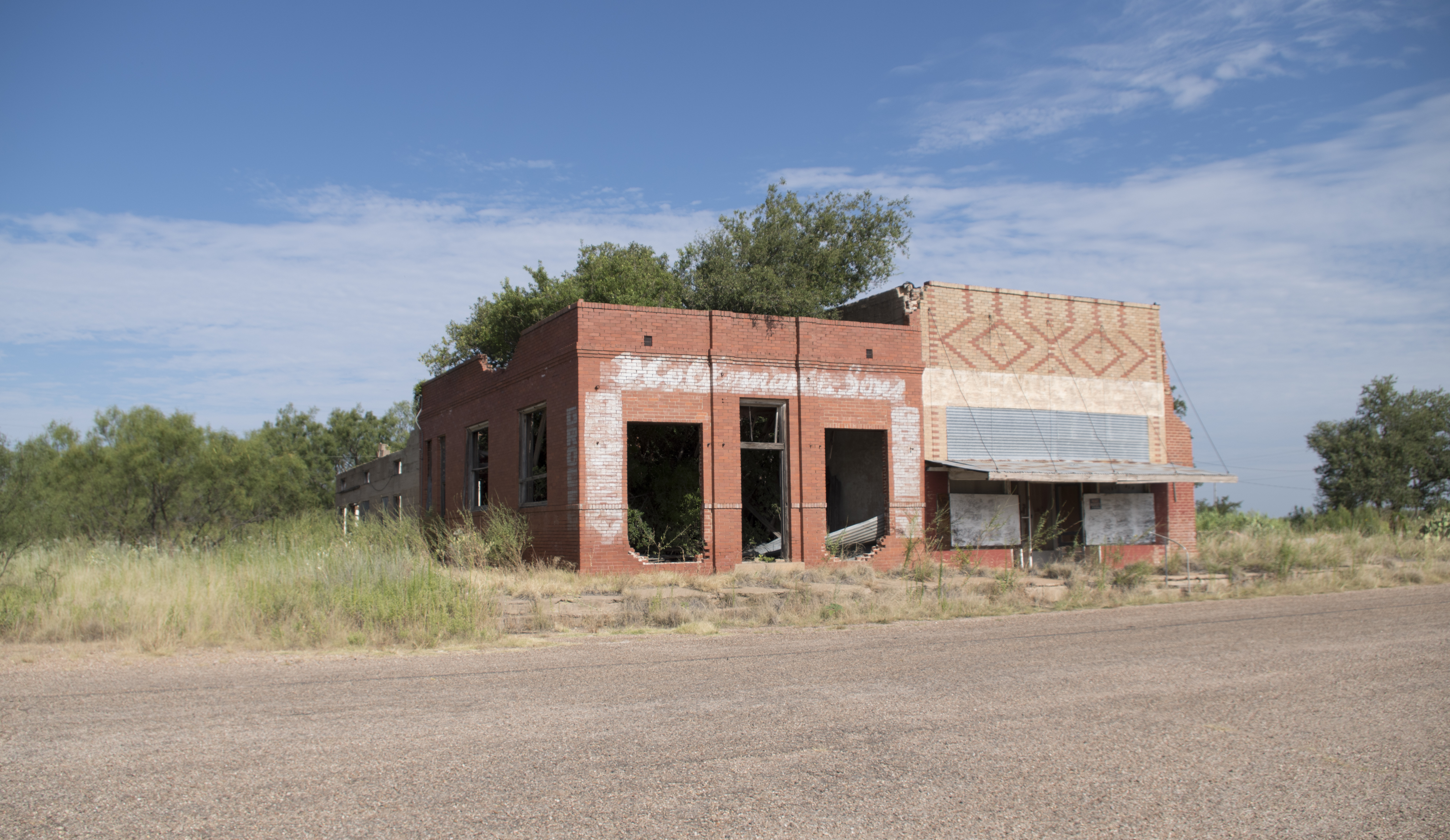
- Holloman & Sons Grocery Store

- Location within the state of Texas Peacock (the United States)
- Coordinates: 33°10′56″N 100°23′57″W
- Country: United States
- State: Texas
- County: Stonewall
- Elevation: 1,877 ft (572 m)
- Time zone: UTC-6 (Central (CST))
  - Summer (DST): UTC-5 (CDT)
- ZIP codes: 79542
- GNIS feature ID: 1364933

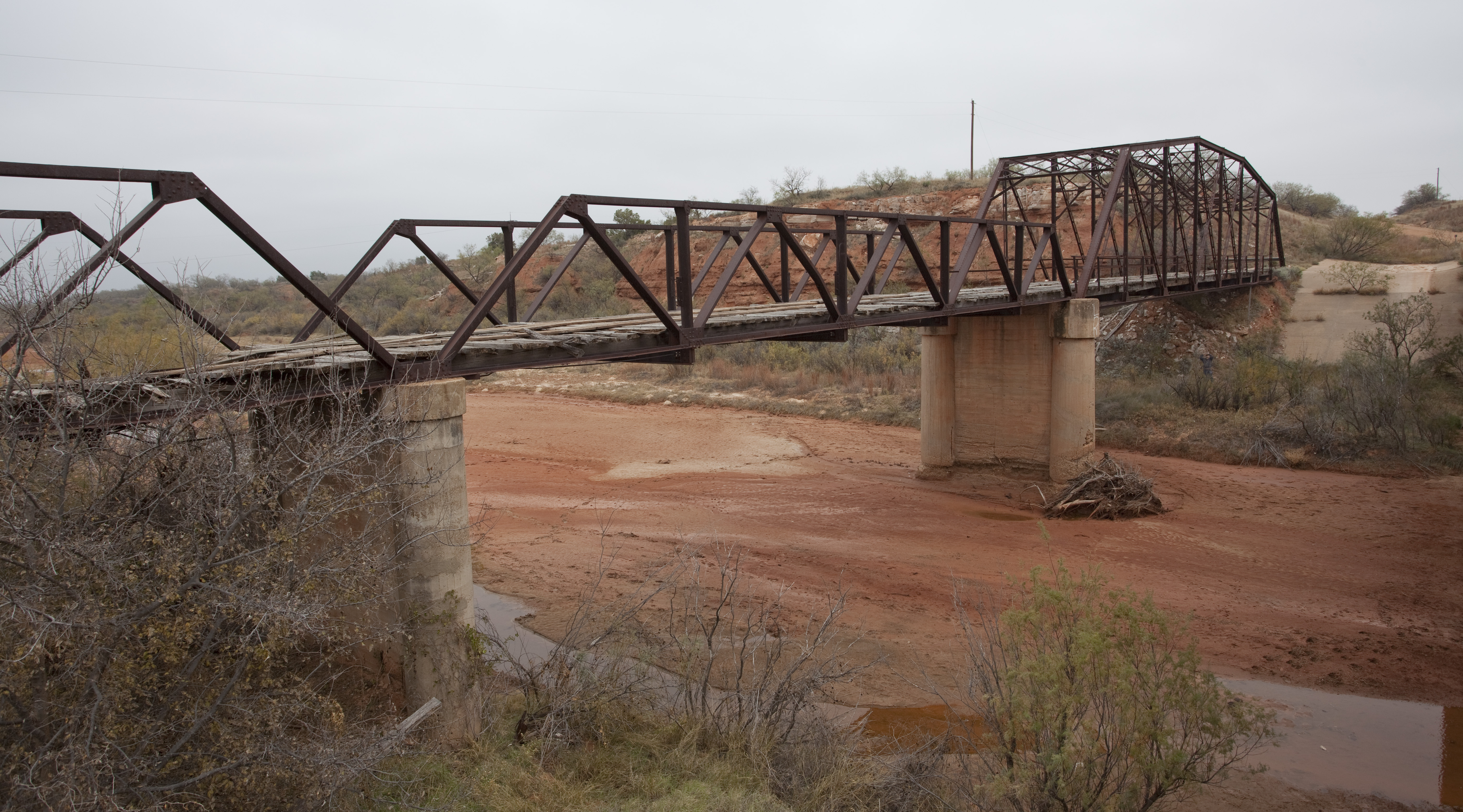
Oriana Bridge crossing the Salt Fork Brazos River.

Peacock is an unincorporated community in Stonewall County, Texas, United States. According to the Handbook of Texas, the community had an estimated population of 125 in 2000.

== Geography ==
Peacock is located 2 mi (3.2 km) south of U.S. Highway 380 along FM 2211 in west central Stonewall County. The townsite was originally called Alluvia when it was established along the now defunct Stamford and Northwestern Railroad, which stretched from Stamford to Plainview. The rail line crossed the Salt Fork Brazos River just to the southwest of Peacock near the community of Oriana (now a ghost town).

== Education ==
Public education in the community is provided by the Aspermont Independent School District. Its post office closed in 1993.
