= Art Briles =

American football player and coach (born 1955)

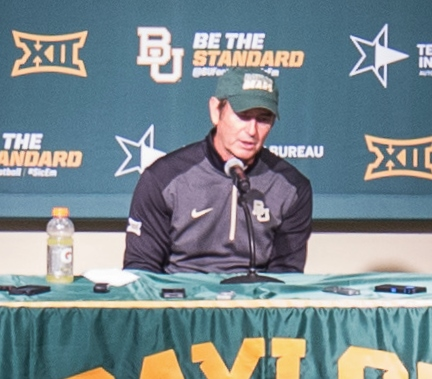
- Briles in 2014

Current position
- Title: Head coach
- Team: Eastern New Mexico
- Conference: LSC
- Record: 0–11

Biographical details
- Born: December 3, 1955 (age 70); Rule, Texas, U.S.
- Education: Texas Tech University (B.A., 1979); Abilene Christian University (M.Ed., 1984)

Playing career
- 1974–1977: Houston
- Position: Wide receiver

Coaching career (HC unless noted)
- 1979: Sundown HS (TX) (assistant)
- 1980–1983: Sweetwater HS (TX) (assistant)
- 1984–1985: Hamlin HS (TX)
- 1986–1987: Georgetown HS (TX)
- 1988–1999: Stephenville HS (TX)
- 2000–2002: Texas Tech (RB)
- 2003–2007: Houston
- 2008–2015: Baylor
- 2018: Guelfi Firenze
- 2019–2020: Mount Vernon HS (TX)
- 2022–2025: Guelfi Firenze
- 2026–present: Eastern New Mexico

Head coaching record
- Overall: 99–76 (college); 166–46–4 (high school); 33–11 (IFL)
- Bowls: 3–6

Accomplishments and honors

Championships
- 1 C-USA (2006); 2 Big 12 (2013–2014); 2 C-USA West Division (2006–2007); 2 IFL (2022, 2025)

Awards
- C-USA Coach of the Year (2006); Big 12 Coach of the Year (2013); AP College Football Coach of the Year (2013)

Arthur Ray Briles (born December 3, 1955) is an American football coach who is currently the head football coach at Eastern New Mexico University. Briles was the head coach of the Houston Cougars from 2002 to 2007 and the Baylor Bears from 2008 to 2015. He is the author of Beating Goliath: My Story of Football and Faith (2014). He is the subject of a biography written by Nick Eatman titled Looking Up: My Journey from Tragedy to Triumph (2013).

== Playing career ==
A native of Rule, Texas, Briles attended Rule High School, where he was coached by his father. Playing quarterback and earning all-state honors, Briles as a senior in 1973 led Rule to the Texas Class B state championship game, where they lost to Big Sandy, led by David Overstreet and Lovie Smith. Briles accepted a scholarship offer by Bill Yeoman at the University of Houston, where he switched to wide receiver and played three seasons, including the 1977 Cotton Bowl Classic. Briles' parents and aunt died in a car crash on U.S. Route 380 near Newcastle, Texas, while on their way to Dallas to see him play in a game on October 16, 1976. His then-girlfriend and now wife, the former Jan Allison, had planned to make the trip with his family, but decided to stay behind in Rule to attend a friend's bridal shower. After finishing the 1976–77 academic year, Briles left Houston and transferred to Texas Tech, which Jan was attending at the time, to complete his bachelor's degree, which he earned in 1979. He earned a master's degree in education at Abilene Christian University before entering coaching.

== Coaching career ==
=== High school ===
I saw how [Briles] went from running a wishbone offense to a multiple offense that used the shotgun and different kinds of snaps. When he began running the spread in Stephenville, he really put defenses in a bind.

— Larry Moorehead, who was an assistant under Briles for 11 years at Hamlin, Georgetown and Stephenville.

Briles served as a head football coach in Texas from 1984 to 1999 and 2019–2020.

Briles began his coaching career as an assistant at Sundown High School. From 1980 to 1983, he served as an assistant at Sweetwater High School. At age 28, he became head coach at 2A Hamlin High School, where he coached from 1984 to 1985. He guided the team to a 27–1–1 record including a 35–19 loss to Electra High School in the 1985 state semifinals. His instant success caught the attention of bigger schools, so Briles left Hamlin for 5A Georgetown High School in 1986, where he had a difficult two-year span in the school's first two seasons at the highest classification in Texas high school football at the time. Briles left the school in 1987 with a 4–15–1 overall record.

In 1988, he took over head coaching duties at 4A Stephenville High School in Stephenville, Texas, a school that was playing in the same area as state powerhouse Brownwood High School and had not reached the playoffs in football since 1952. After a 4–5–1 season in 1989, Briles' Stephenville squads made the playoffs in 1990 and ever since. During Briles' tenure they won four state championships, including back-to-back titles in 1993 and 1994, and then again in 1998 and 1999. In the 1993 and '94 state finals, Briles' Stephenville squads faced La Marque, then coached by Briles' defensive coordinator at Houston, Alan Weddell. Briles' record at Stephenville was 135–29–2.

Although Stephenville's offense was devastating throughout the 1990s, Briles shifted his offensive scheme from a running game in the early 1990s to a passing game in the late 90s. Stephenville's first two state championship teams scored 89 touchdowns rushing in 1993, and 96 touchdowns rushing in 1994, which was second and third all-time in the nation, respectively, only behind Big Sandy's national record 114 touchdowns rushing from the 1975 season. In the late 1990s, Briles adapted the spread offense and today is one of the coaches credited for introducing it to Texas high school football. His 1998 team posted 8,664 yards of total offense, breaking the 73-year-old national record 8,588 yards originally established by Pine Bluff High School in 1925.

Briles was also known for developing quarterbacks, sending six of his former players to Division I colleges, including Kelan Luker, Branndon Stewart, Kevin Kolb, and his son Kendal Briles.

Briles ended his first high school coaching stint in 1999 with a record of 165–46–3.

=== College ===
Briles left Stephenville after the 1999 season to join Mike Leach's staff at Texas Tech. While serving as running backs coach, Briles improved Texas Tech's rushing average every year from 66.4 yards a game in his first year to 99.6 yards a game in 2002. He also coached all-conference backs and later NFL players Ricky A. Williams, Shaud Williams, and Taurean Henderson. In addition, the first player he recruited to Texas Tech, an undersized wide receiver Wes Welker, went on to catch more than 250 passes and return an NCAA-record eight punts for touchdowns while at Tech, and then had even greater success in the NFL with five Pro Bowl appearances.

In 2003, Briles was hired as head coach at the University of Houston, where he took over a program that had an 8–26 record under the previous coach, Dana Dimel. The Cougars went 0–11 two years before Briles' arrival. In his first season, Briles led the Cougars to a 7–5 record, including a 54–48 triple-overtime loss to Hawaiʻi, in the Sheraton Hawaiʻi Bowl.

After a 3–8 season in 2004, Briles guided the Cougars to a 6–6 season and another bowl game in 2005. In 2006, he led the Cougars to a 10–4 record and the Conference USA Championship that was played on December 1, 2006. The Cougars won the game, 34–20, and it was the school's second C-USA Championship (the first came in 1996, in the school's inaugural season in the C-USA).

In 2007, the Cougars finished second in the Conference USA West Division to Todd Graham's Tulsa Golden Hurricane. Houston was invited to the Texas Bowl, which was played December 28, 2007, at Reliant Stadium. It was Houston's fourth bowl appearance in five years. Briles left the Cougars before their bowl game to take the head coaching job at Baylor.

Briles interviewed for the Baylor head coach position on November 27, 2007, and was hired the next day for a seven-year term.

As had been the case at Houston, Briles inherited a Baylor program that had fallen on hard times. The Bears had not had a winning season since 1995, and had won a total of 11 conference games in 12 years of Big 12 play.

In his first season at Baylor, Briles led the Bears to a 4–8 record, 2–6 in Big 12 play. The season featured the emergence of freshman quarterback Robert Griffin III, and the team's second win in 23 years over rival Texas A&M. In his second season at Baylor, the Bears again finished with a 4–8 record. However, they only went 1–7 in Big 12 conference play. Griffin was injured and missed every conference game. Baylor bounced back in 2010 with a 7–5 (4–4 conference) record with Griffin, who passed for over 3,000 yards, at the helm. This led to a bid in the Texas Bowl, where they lost to Illinois. It was still their first winning season and bowl appearance in 15 years.

Briles led the 2011 Baylor team in its most successful season since the formation of the Big 12 Conference in 1996. With Baylor's win in the 2011 Valero Alamo Bowl game, Briles led the Bears to a 10–3 record. The only other time Baylor has won as many as 10 games was in 1980. The 2011 season opened at home against 14th-ranked TCU. In a nationally televised game, Baylor won a dramatic 50–48 decision. It was Baylor's first win over a ranked opponent since 2004. In Big 12 Conference play the Bears would accumulate a 6–3 record, eclipsing their previous high of 4 conference wins in 2010. The Bears finished a perfect 7–0 at Floyd Casey Stadium, including a 45–38 upset victory over the #5 Oklahoma Sooners and a 48–24 victory over #22 Texas. The victory over Oklahoma was the first for the Bears, having lost the previous 20 meetings between the two schools. In 2011, Baylor also defeated Texas Tech for the first time since 1995 (snapping a 15-game losing streak to the Red Raiders). Following the conclusion of the 2011 regular season, Baylor quarterback Robert Griffin III, whom Briles was instrumental in recruiting and developing, was awarded the 77th annual Heisman Trophy.

Briles won 17 Big 12 conference games in his first five years as head coach. Baylor had won only 11 Big 12 conference games in the 12 seasons preceding his arrival.

Under Briles, the Bears completed the 2012 regular season by winning four of their last five games. Perhaps the apex of Briles' 2012 season was his involvement in the most-stunning upset of 2012 when his unranked Bears defeated the Kansas State Wildcats, BCS No. 1 ranked team at the time, by a score of 52–24, which propelled Baylor in winning its final 3 games, earning the Bears an invitation to play UCLA in the Holiday Bowl in San Diego.

In 2013, Briles led Baylor to one of the best seasons in school history. The Bears started the season 9–0, propelling them as high as third in the nation at one point. They ultimately finished with a school-record 11 wins and only the second top-ten finish in school history. A 30–10 win over Texas in the final game of the season garnered them the outright Big 12 title—their first outright conference title since winning their last outright Southwest Conference title in 1980. This earned them a trip to the 2014 Fiesta Bowl—their first-ever BCS appearance, and their first major-bowl appearance since 1980. They lost this game to the University of Central Florida 52–42. News reports on the day after the Fiesta Bowl named Briles as the leading candidate to replace Mack Brown as head coach at the University of Texas, however, Briles announced on January 3 that he would remain at Baylor.

In 2014, Briles's Bears finished with another 11 win season and repeated as Big 12 Co-Champions; this time earning a berth in the 2015 Cotton Bowl, one of the New Years Six bowl games. They entered the game against the Michigan State Spartans with high hopes after narrowly missing the College Football Playoff. The Bears jumped out to a 41–21 lead in the third quarter before giving up 21 unanswered points to lose 42–41. After the game Briles described the loss as, "one of the tougher non-wins that I've ever experienced." Even with the loss, Baylor finished the year ranked #7 in the AP poll, their second top ten finish in school history. It was also Baylor's fifth consecutive bowl appearance, a school record, and their second consecutive bowl loss.

==== Scandal at Baylor ====
On May 26, 2016, Baylor released a findings of fact document prepared by the board of regents. According to the regents, the document was based on an independent investigation by the law firm Pepper Hamilton into how the school handled sexual assault. The report stated that the findings "reflect significant concerns about the tone and culture within Baylor's football program as it relates to accountability for all forms of athlete misconduct." It also faulted the football team for not adequately vetting transfers. The regents held Briles responsible, and suspended him with intent to fire him for cause as soon as they were legally allowed to do so.

Briles and Baylor reached a settlement on June 17. His contract was formally terminated, but he was provided a letter of recommendation and a severance fee. Briles said he was never shown the evidence for why Baylor chose to fire him. Briles sued the school for wrongful termination, among other claims. The case was settled in 2018 with Baylor paying Briles $15.1 million. "In the joint settlement statement issued by Briles and Baylor in June 2016, both sides acknowledged 'serious shortcomings in the response to reports of sexual violence by some student-athletes, including deficiencies in university processes and the delegation of disciplinary responsibilities with the football program.'" Baylor president Ken Starr lost his job and Athletic Director Ian McCaw resigned in wake of the scandal.

In May 2017, Baylor's legal counsel Christopher Holmes sent Briles a letter saying that Baylor was unaware of Briles discouraging victims from reporting to law enforcement or university officials. The letter was released by the Canadian Football League to the Waco Tribune-Herald in September 2017.

In 2018 it was reported that victims suing Baylor accused the school of "concealing records involving its judicial affairs and police departments". On June 19, 2018, former Baylor athletic director Ian McCaw testified during a deposition that the sexual assault scandal that engulfed the school's football program was manufactured by investigators and regents to cover up a larger university-wide issue. McCaw alleged Baylor hatched "an elaborate plan that essentially scapegoated black football players and the football program for being responsible for what was a decades-long, university-wide sexual assault scandal", according to court documents. In late July 2018, Briles turned over documents pursuant to a subpoena, which had not been previously produced by Baylor. The documents showed multiple senior Baylor administrators knew about a serial sexual assault assailant" in fall 2011, but, along with Briles, failed to act.

=== Canadian Football League ===
On August 28, 2017, Briles was hired by the Canadian Football League's Hamilton Tiger-Cats as assistant head coach for offense. Briles used a letter from the Baylor legal department in his efforts to secure a job with the Tiger-Cats. However, in the face of a firestorm of criticism and pressure from league officials, the TiCats reversed course hours later and announced Briles would not join the team.

TiCats owner Bob Young conceded that night that hiring Briles had been "a major blunder," and credited CFL Commissioner Randy Ambrosie with persuading the team to rescind the hire. The following day, Young issued a statement apologizing for "a large and serious mistake." CEO and general manager Scott Mitchell said that team officials got so focused on "the inner sanctum of football discussions" that they forgot about the larger questions of "our standing in the community."

=== Italian Football League (first stint) ===
On August 2, 2018, Briles was announced as the head coach of the Guelfi Firenze American football team located in Florence, Italy, a member of the Italian Football League. In his first season in Italy, Guelfi Firenze went 8–3 overall, losing in the final.

=== Return to US and high school football ===
Briles was hired as the head coach for Mount Vernon High School in Texas in May 2019 on a two-year deal.

A month into his first season, Briles and Mount Vernon were publicly reprimanded by a state oversight committee for using ineligible players and for using an assistant coach who wasn't a full-time employee of the district. However, Mount Vernon was not forced to forfeit any games.

On November 16, 2019, the Mount Vernon Tigers, coached by Briles, lost to the Sabine Cardinals in the first round of the Texas high school playoffs, 20–14.

On December 14, 2020, Briles resigned as head coach after posting a 20–6 record in 2 seasons, after losing to the Jim Ned Indians in the state semi-finals on December 11, 2020.

On February 24, 2022, Briles returned to the college game when he was hired by Hue Jackson as the offensive coordinator for Grambling State. However, the prior scandals prompted Briles' resignation only four days later on February 28.

=== Italian Football League (second stint) ===
Briles re-signed to coach the Guelfi Firenze in the Italian Football League for the 2022 season. Briles led the team to a 6–2 regular season and three playoff wins (9–2 overall), while winning the 41st Italian Bowl championship game with a 21–17 upset over the Milano Seamen on July 2, 2022.

=== Eastern New Mexico ===
On November 23, 2025, Briles was announced as the next head coach for the Eastern New Mexico Greyhounds. In his first season at ENMU, the Greyhounds went 0-11, marking the school's first winless season since 1945.

== Personal life ==
His son, Kendal Briles, is also a college coach. His daughter, Staley, married Jeff Lebby who is presently the head football coach of Mississippi State.

== Head coaching record ==
=== College ===
Year	Team	Overall	Conference	Standing	Bowl/playoffs	Coaches^{#}	AP^{°}
Houston Cougars (Conference USA) (2003–2007)
2003	Houston	7–6	4–4	T–6th	L Hawaiʻi		
2004	Houston	3–8	3–5	T–5th			
2005	Houston	6–6	4–4	T–3rd (West)	L Fort Worth		
2006	Houston	10–4	7–1	1st (West)	L Liberty		
2007	Houston	8–4	6–2	T–1st (West)	Texas*		
Houston:		34–28	24–16	*Left Houston before bowl game			
Baylor Bears (Big 12 Conference) (2008–2015)
2008	Baylor	4–8	2–6	T–5th (South)			
2009	Baylor	4–8	1–7	6th (South)			
2010	Baylor	7–6	4–4	4th (South)	L Texas		
2011	Baylor	10–3	6–3	T–3rd	W Alamo	12	13
2012	Baylor	8–5	4–5	T–5th	W Holiday		
2013	Baylor	11–2	8–1	1st	L Fiesta^{†}	13	13
2014	Baylor	11–2	8–1	T–1st	L Cotton^{†}	8	7
2015	Baylor	10–3	6–3	4th	W Russell Athletic	13	13
Baylor:		65–37	39–30				
Eastern New Mexico Greyhounds (Lone Star Conference) (2026–present)
2026	Eastern New Mexico	0–11	0–9	11th			
Eastern New Mexico:		0–11	0–9				
Total:		99–76					
National championship Conference title Conference division title or championship game berth
^{†}Indicates BCS or CFP / New Years' Six bowl.; ^{#}Rankings from final Coaches Poll.; ^{°}Rankings from final AP Poll.

=== Italian Football League ===
Year	Team	Overall	Group	Postseason Result
2018	Florence	4–6	T–5th	
2022	Florence	6–2	2nd	XLI Italian Bowl Champions
2023	Florence	7–1	1st	Lost XLII Italian Bowl
2024	Florence	6–2	2nd	Lost XLIII Italian Bowl
2025	Florence	10–0	1st	XLIV Italian Bowl Champions
Overall		33–11	.750	
