= Pete Hart =

Pete Hart may refer to:

- Parker T. Hart (1910–1997), U.S. diplomat
- Peter D. Hart, American pollster
- Peter E. Hart (born c. 1940s), computer scientist and pioneer in artificial intelligence
- Peter Hart (historian) (1963–2010), Canadian historian, specialising in modern Irish history
- Peter Hart, media analyst at Fairness and Accuracy in Reporting
- Peter Hart (footballer) (born 1957), English footballer
- Pete Hart (American football) (born 1933), American football player
