= Paint Creek Independent School District =

School district in Texas

Coordinates: 33.0626°N 99.6749°W

Location
- Paint Creek, TX ESC Region 14 USA

District information
- Type: Public
- Grades: Pre-K through 12
- Superintendent: Glen Hill

Students and staff
- Athletic conference: UIL Class A (six-man football participant)
- District mascot: Pirate
- Colors: Maroon and White

Other information
- Website: www.paintcreek.esc14.net

Paint Creek Independent School District is a public school district based in the community of Paint Creek in unincorporated Haskell County, Texas (USA). Its headquarters are along Farm to Market Road 600. Most of the district is in Haskell County, and a small portion of the district extends into Jones County. Paint Creek ISD has one school that serves students in grades pre-kindergarten through twelve.

== History ==
The district formed in 1937 from the consolidation of the Post, Howard, Weaver, Rose, and McConnell school districts. The name was chosen from a nearby stream. Construction on the first school building began in 1937 and was completed in the summer of 1938. Between 1938 and 1941 five additional small school districts – Plainview, Ward, Rockdale, Ericksdahl, and Cobb – merged to form the current Paint Creek district.

== Academic achievement ==
In 2009, the school district was rated "recognized" by the Texas Education Agency.

== Schools ==
- Paint Creek Elementary School
- Paint Creek Secondary School

== Special programs ==
=== Athletics ===
Paint Creek High School plays six-man football.

== Famous alumni ==
- Governor of Texas Rick Perry (Class of 1968 of Paint Creek High School).
