= Charles Ready Haskell =

Charles Ready Haskell was killed in the Goliad massacre. There is a town and a county, both named Haskell in Texas named after him.

Haskell was a native of Tennessee.
