= Stonewall County Airport =

Public airport in Aspermont, Texas, United States

- IATA: none; ICAO: none; FAA LID: T60

Summary
- Airport type: Public
- Owner: Stonewall County, Texas
- Serves: Aspermont, Texas
- Elevation AMSL: 1,744.0 ft / 531.6 m
- Coordinates: 33°10′13″N 100°11′50″W

Map

Runways
Direction	Length		Surface
Direction	ft	m	Surface
17/35	4,000	1,219	Asphalt

Statistics (2015)
- Aircraft operations: 400
- Based aircraft: 0
- Sources: Federal Aviation Administration except as noted

Stonewall County Airport (FAA LID: T60) is a public airport in Aspermont, Stonewall County, Texas, United States, located 1 nautical mile (1.9 km) northeast of the central business district. The airport has no IATA or ICAO designation.

The airport is owned by Stonewall County and is used solely for general aviation purposes.

== Facilities ==
Stonewall County Airport covers 80 acres (32 ha) at an elevation of 1,744.0 feet (531.6 m) above mean sea level (AMSL), and has one runway:

- Runway 17/35: 4,000 x 60 ft. (1,219 x 18 m), Surface: Asphalt

For the 12-month period ending 26 May 2015, the airport had 400 aircraft operations, an average of 33 per month: 100% general aviation. At that time there were no aircraft based at this airport.

== See also ==
- List of airports in Texas
