= Old Glory, Texas =

- Unincorporated community
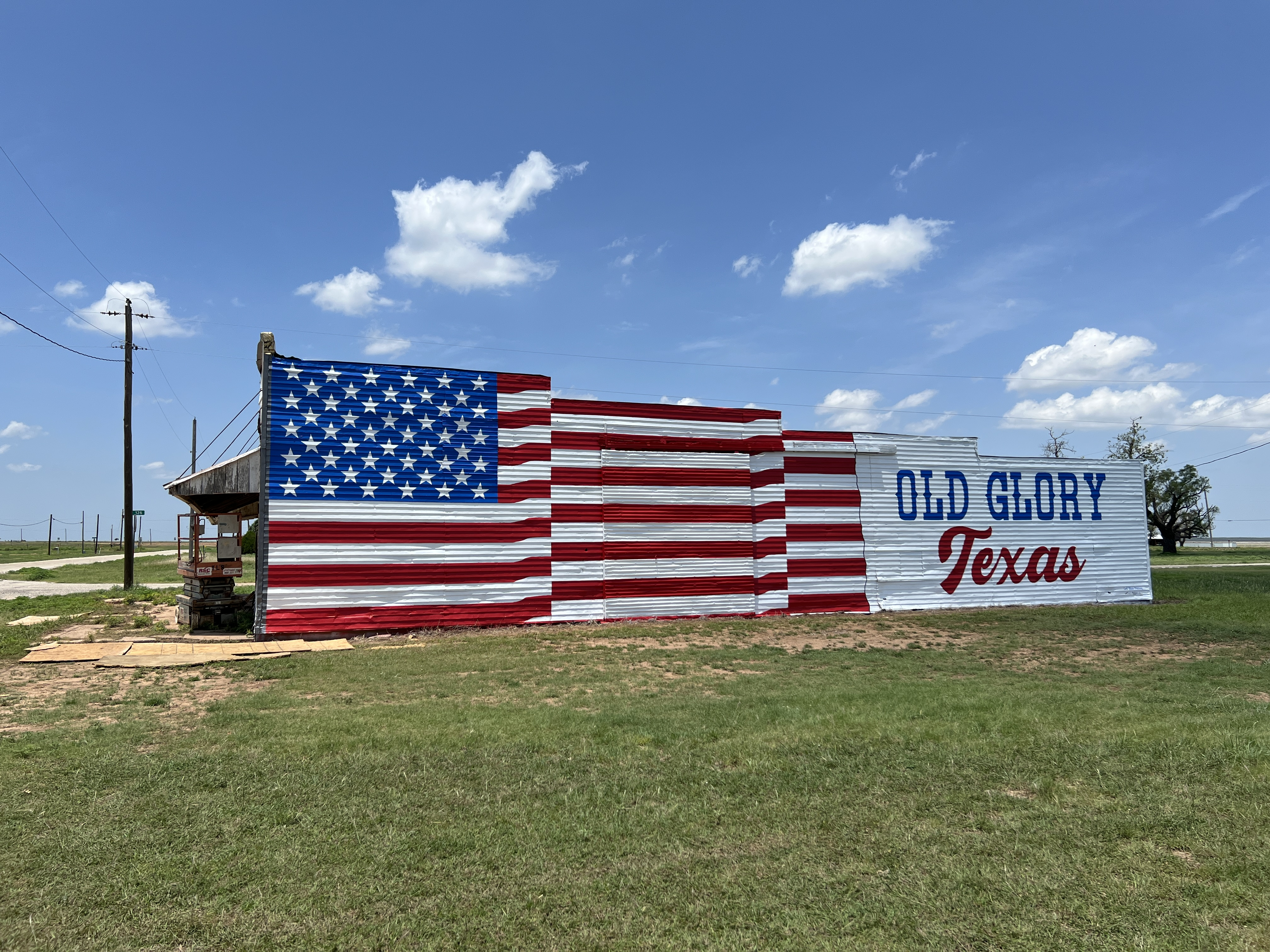

- Location within the state of Texas Old Glory (the United States)
- Coordinates: 33°07′47″N 100°03′21″W
- Country: United States
- State: Texas
- County: Stonewall
- Elevation: 1,673 ft (510 m)
- Time zone: UTC-6 (Central (CST))
  - Summer (DST): UTC-5 (CDT)
- ZIP codes: 79540
- GNIS feature ID: 1364423

Old Glory is an unincorporated community in Stonewall County, Texas, United States. The community has an estimated population of 100.

== Geography ==
Old Glory is situated immediately south of the junction of U.S. Highway 380 and FM 1835 in eastern Stonewall County, between the Double Mountain Fork and the Salt Fork Brazos River.

Old Glory lies nine miles east of Aspermont and sixty-two miles northwest of Abilene.

== History ==
Development of the area began in the late 1880s with a few ranches and scattered farms. Circa 1900, a number of German families from southeastern Texas moved to the vicinity and settled along the Double Mountain Fork Brazos River. In 1903, G.R. Spielhagen laid out a town site two miles southeast of the present-day location and named it Brandenburg. Only a school house and a general store were constructed there. The Stamford and Northwestern Railway Company was chartered to build a railroad from Stamford to Spur in 1909. The Swenson Land and Cattle Company provided a town site two miles northwest of the Brandenburg settlement. The new town became known as New Brandenburg, with the original referred to as Old Brandenburg, which soon died out. New Brandenburg, or simply Brandenburg, continued to grow. A mercantile store, a gin, post office, and a one room school house served the community.

The outbreak of World War I had an adverse impact on New Brandenburg. The rise in anti-German sentiment in the United States and Texas caused residents to petition the U.S. Postal Service to change the community's name from New Brandenburg to Old Glory. They wanted to demonstrate their patriotism and pride in their adopted country. The name change became official on August 9, 1918. By 1929, Old Glory had an estimated population of 275. A school building erected in 1930, following the consolidation of five local schools had an enrollment of nearly 300 students by the late 1930s. The Great Depression caused a brief decline in Old Glory's population, but had rebounded to around 250 by the late 1940s. That number had fallen to 175 in the late 1940s. A severe drought in the 1950s forced many people out of work. The development of oil resources in Stonewall County during the late 1950s and early 1960s caused a brief economic Boom in Old Glory. In 1965, there were approximately 250 people living in the community. Old Glory's population fell to 125 in the 1970s and remained at that level through the 1990s. The present-day number of Old Glory residents stands at around 100.

Although Old Glory is unincorporated, it does have a post office, with the zip code of 79540.

== Public education ==
Public education in the community of Old Glory is provided by the Aspermont Independent School District. The district's campuses are located in the town of Aspermont.

The Old Glory Independent School District once served the community, but rapidly declining enrollment caused the district and its schools to close. On July 1, 1985, the areas once served by Old Glory ISD were annexed into the Aspermont Independent School District.
