= Pete Hart (American football) =

American football player (born 1933)

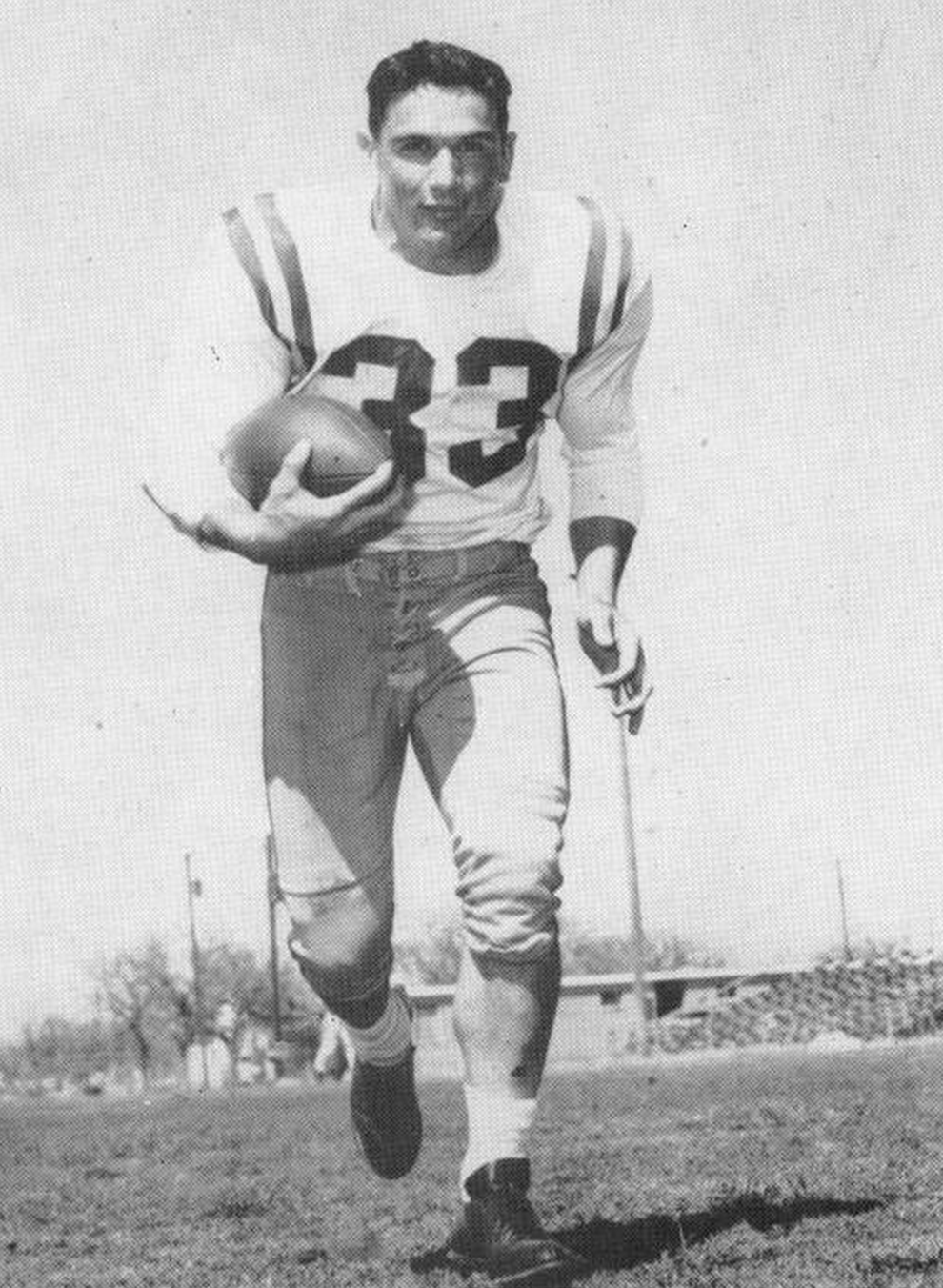
- Hart at Hardin–Simmons, c. 1957

No. 33
- Position: Fullback

Personal information
- Born: April 19, 1933; Aspermont, Texas, U.S.
- Died: May 15, 2024 (aged 91)
- Listed height: 5 ft 9 in (1.75 m)
- Listed weight: 190 lb (86 kg)

Career information
- High school: Aspermont
- College: Hardin–Simmons
- NFL draft: 1959: 17th round, 194th overall pick

Career history
- New York Titans (1960)

Career AFL statistics
- Rushing yards: 113
- Rushing average: 4.5
- Receptions: 3
- Receiving yards: 19
- Stats at Pro Football Reference

Dee Whitfield "Pete" Hart (April 19, 1933 - May 15, 2024) was an American former professional football player who was a fullback with the New York Titans of the American Football League (AFL). He played college football for the Hardin–Simmons Cowboys.
