= Rule Independent School District =

School district in Texas

Coordinates: 33.1790°N 99.8940°W

Rule Independent School District is a public school district based in Rule, Texas (USA). Located in western Haskell County, a small portion of the district extends into Stonewall County.

Rule ISD has one school Rule School that serves students in grades pre-kindergarten through twelve.

In 2009, the school district was rated "academically acceptable" by the Texas Education Agency.

== See also ==
- List of school districts in Texas
