= Rule, Texas =

- Town
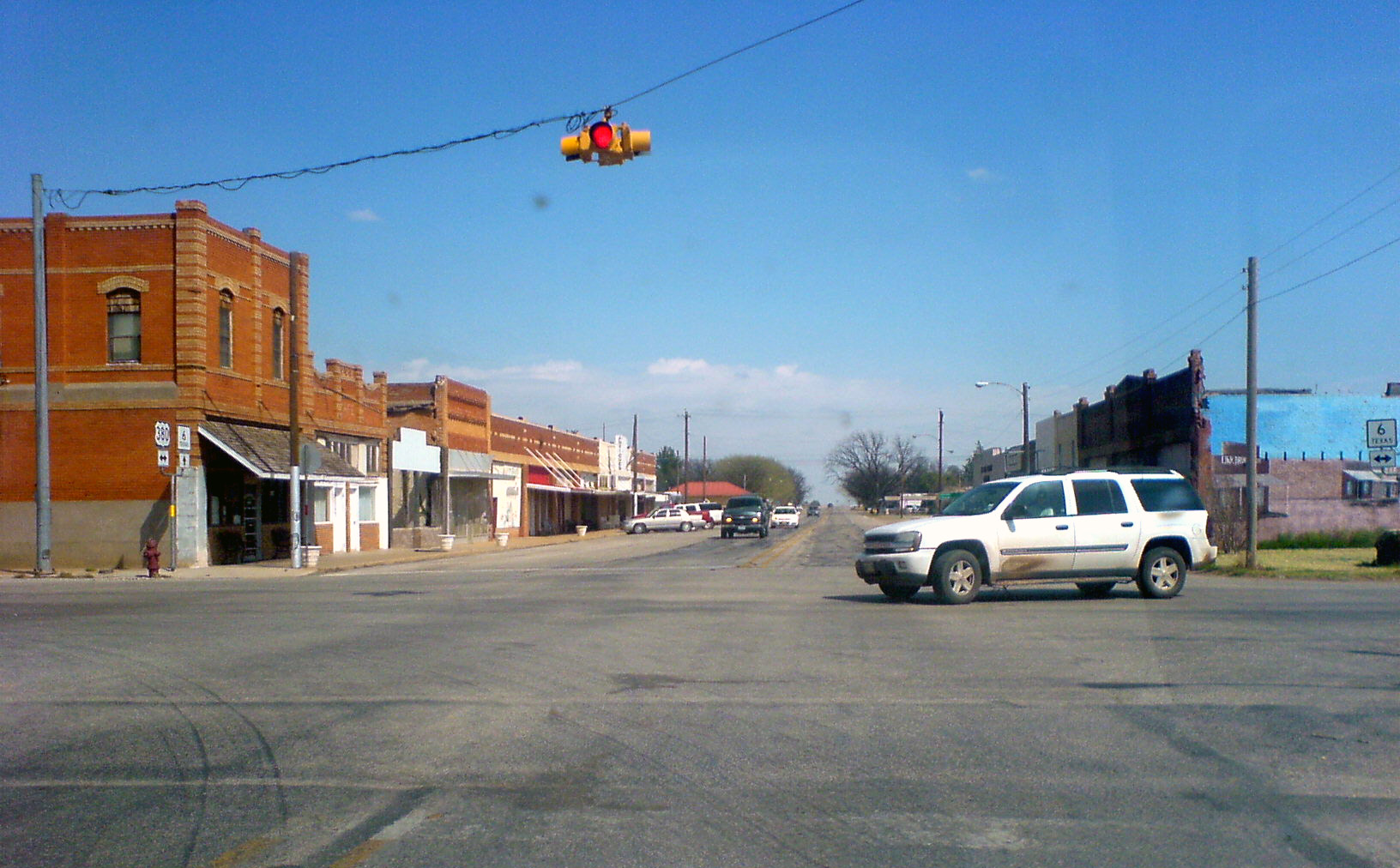
- Downtown Rule

- Location within Texas Location within the United States
- Coordinates: 33°10′55″N 99°53′36″W
- Country: United States
- State: Texas
- County: Haskell

Area
  - Total: 0.69 sq mi (1.80 km^{2})
  - Land: 0.69 sq mi (1.80 km^{2})
  - Water: 0 sq mi (0.00 km^{2})
- Elevation: 1,680 ft (510 m)

Population (2020)
  - Total: 561
  - Density: 807/sq mi (312/km^{2})
- Time zone: UTC-6 (Central (CST))
  - Summer (DST): UTC-5 (CDT)
- ZIP codes: 79547-79548
- Area code: 940
- FIPS code: 48-63752
- GNIS feature ID: 2412582
- Website: www.ruletexas.gov

Rule is a town in Haskell County, Texas, United States. The population was 561 at the 2020 census, down from 636 at the 2010 census.

The community was named for W. A. Rule, a railroad man.

== Geography ==
Rule is in western Haskell County at the intersection of US 380 and SH 6. US 380 leads east 9 miles (14 km) to Haskell, the county seat, and west 11 miles (18 km) to Old Glory, while Highway 6 leads north 9 miles (14 km) to Rochester and south 19 miles (31 km) to Stamford.

According to the United States Census Bureau, the town of Rule has a total area of 0.7 square miles (1.8 km^{2}), all land.

=== Climate ===
The climate in this area is characterized by hot, humid summers and generally mild to cool winters. According to the Köppen climate classification system, Rule has a humid subtropical climate, Cfa on climate maps.

Climate data for Rule, Texas (1991-2020)
Month	Jan	Feb	Mar	Apr	May	Jun	Jul	Aug	Sep	Oct	Nov	Dec	Year
Mean daily maximum °F (°C)	56.1 (13.4)	60.3 (15.7)	68.9 (20.5)	77.9 (25.5)	85.5 (29.7)	92.7 (33.7)	96.6 (35.9)	95.9 (35.5)	87.9 (31.1)	78.2 (25.7)	66.0 (18.9)	57.2 (14.0)	76.9 (25.0)
Daily mean °F (°C)	42.8 (6.0)	46.4 (8.0)	54.7 (12.6)	63.2 (17.3)	72.3 (22.4)	80.3 (26.8)	84.1 (28.9)	83.2 (28.4)	75.4 (24.1)	64.7 (18.2)	52.7 (11.5)	44.2 (6.8)	63.7 (17.6)
Mean daily minimum °F (°C)	29.4 (−1.4)	32.5 (0.3)	40.6 (4.8)	48.5 (9.2)	59.1 (15.1)	68.0 (20.0)	71.6 (22.0)	70.5 (21.4)	62.8 (17.1)	51.2 (10.7)	39.4 (4.1)	31.2 (−0.4)	50.4 (10.2)
Average precipitation inches (mm)	1.03 (26)	1.34 (34)	1.75 (44)	1.94 (49)	3.26 (83)	3.61 (92)	1.98 (50)	2.29 (58)	2.89 (73)	2.24 (57)	1.57 (40)	1.16 (29)	25.06 (635)
Average dew point °F (°C)	27.7 (−2.4)	31.0 (−0.6)	37.3 (2.9)	44.5 (6.9)	55.0 (12.8)	62.7 (17.1)	63.3 (17.4)	62.6 (17.0)	58.8 (14.9)	48.8 (9.3)	38.0 (3.3)	29.9 (−1.2)	46.6 (8.1)
Source: PRISM Climate Group

== Demographics ==
Historical population
Census	Pop.	Note	%±
1910	891		—
1920	890		−0.1%
1930	1,094		22.9%
1940	1,195		9.2%
1950	1,251		4.7%
1960	1,347		7.7%
1970	1,024		−24.0%
1980	1,015		−0.9%
1990	783		−22.9%
2000	698		−10.9%
2010	636		−8.9%
2020	561		−11.8%
U.S. Decennial Census

=== 2020 census ===
Rule racial composition (NH = Non-Hispanic) (Note: Note: the US Census treats Hispanic/Latino as an ethnic category. This table excludes Latinos from the racial categories and assigns them to a separate category. Hispanics/Latinos can be of any race.)
Race	Number	Percentage
White (NH)	366	65.24%
Black or African American (NH)	9	1.6%
Native American or Alaska Native (NH)	5	0.89%
Pacific Islander (NH)	1	0.18%
Some Other Race (NH)	3	0.53%
Mixed/Multi-Racial (NH)	26	4.63%
Hispanic or Latino	151	26.92%
Total	561	

As of the 2020 United States census, there were 561 people, 347 households, and 173 families residing in the town.

=== 2000 census ===
As of the census of 2000, there were 698 people, 300 households, and 207 families residing in the town. The population density was 1,003 inhabitants per square mile (387/km^{2}). There were 386 housing units at an average density of 555 per square mile (214/km^{2}). The racial makeup of the town was 87.82% White, 2.15% African American, 0.14% Native American, 7.31% from other races, and 2.58% from two or more races. Hispanic or Latino of any race were 19.34% of the population.

There were 300 households, out of which 27.7% had children under the age of 18 living with them, 59.0% were married couples living together, 8.3% had a female householder with no husband present, and 30.7% were non-families. 28.7% of all households were made up of individuals, and 19.3% had someone living alone who was 65 years of age or older. The average household size was 2.33 and the average family size was 2.87.

In the town, the population was spread out, with 24.6% under the age of 18, 4.6% from 18 to 24, 21.2% from 25 to 44, 23.6% from 45 to 64, and 25.9% who were 65 years of age or older. The median age was 45 years. For every 100 females, there were 93.4 males. For every 100 females age 18 and over, there were 85.9 males.

The median income for a household in the town was $24,342, and the median income for a family was $30,069. Males had a median income of $22,708 versus $14,167 for females. The per capita income for the town was $14,454. About 14% of the families and 20% of the population were below the poverty line, including 25.4% of those under age 18 and 15.3% of those age 65 or over.

== Education ==
The Town of Rule is served by the Rule Independent School District and Rule High School.

== Notable people ==
- Art Briles, football coach and player
- Wes Kittley, head coach of the Texas Tech Red Raiders track and field team
