= Paint Creek, Texas =

- Unincorporated community
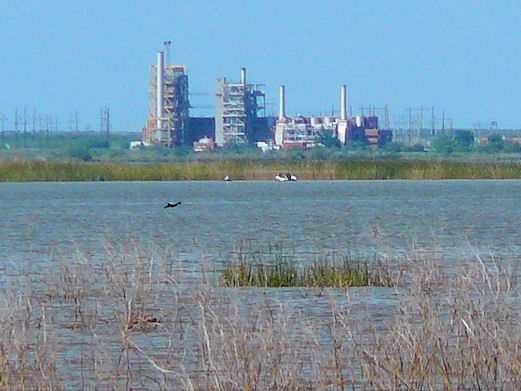
- Paint Creek Power Plant at Lake Stamford

- Location within Texas Location within the United States
- Coordinates: 33°03′46″N 99°40′22″W
- Country: United States
- State: Texas
- County: Haskell
- Elevation: 1,476 ft (450 m)

Population (2010)
  - Total: 324
- Time zone: UTC-6 (Central CST))
  - Summer (DST): UTC-6 (CDT)
- ZIP code: 79521
- Area code: 940
- FIPS code: 48209
- GNIS feature ID: 1378817

Paint Creek is an unincorporated community in southeast Haskell County, Texas, United States, in north central Texas.

== History ==
Paint Creek is named after the nearby stream, which Stamford Dam impounds 8 miles to the east of the community to form Lake Stamford. In 2011, press reports indicated Haskell County had a population of 5,899, down from about 14,000 in 1950.

It is the hometown of 14th United States Secretary of Energy, former Governor of Texas and two time U.S. presidential candidate Rick Perry, who served as Texas's 47th governor and the longest-serving governor in Texas history.

The Paint Creek Independent School District serves area students.

== Logistical data ==
The community is 40 miles (64 km) north of Abilene.
