= Stonewall County, Texas =

County in Texas, United States

- County
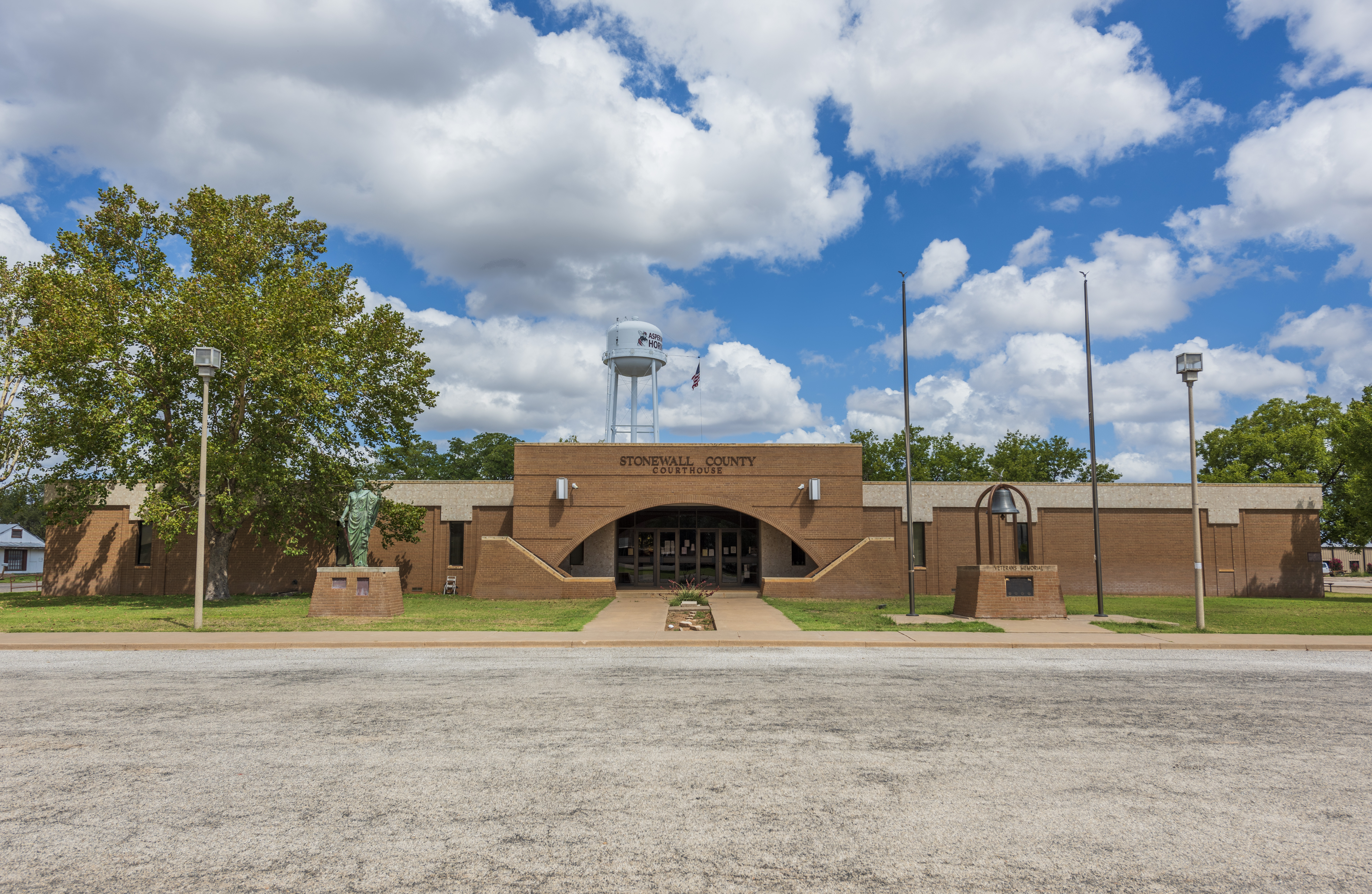
- Stonewall County Courthouse in Aspermont

- Location within the U.S. state of Texas
- Coordinates: 33°11′N 100°15′W
- Country: United States
- State: Texas
- Founded: 1888
- Named for: Stonewall Jackson
- Seat: Aspermont
- Largest town: Aspermont

Area
  - Total: 920 sq mi (2,400 km^{2})
  - Land: 916 sq mi (2,370 km^{2})
  - Water: 3.9 sq mi (10 km^{2}) 0.4%

Population (2020)
  - Total: 1,245
  - Estimate (2025): 1,186 ▼
  - Density: 1.36/sq mi (0.525/km^{2})
- Time zone: UTC−6 (Central)
  - Summer (DST): UTC−5 (CDT)
- Congressional district: 19th
- Website: www.stonewallcounty.org

Stonewall County is a county located in the U.S. state of Texas. As of the 2020 census, its population was 1,245. Its county seat is Aspermont. The county was created in 1876 and organized in 1888. It is named for Stonewall Jackson, a general of the Confederate States Army.

== History ==
Stonewall County was formed in 1876 from the Young Territory. It was initially attached to Young County, Throckmorton County, and then Jones County, before finally becoming fully organized in 1889.

== Geography ==
According to the U.S. Census Bureau, the county has a total area of 920 square miles (2,400 km^{2}), of which 3.9 square miles (10 km^{2}) (0.4%) are covered by water.

=== Geographic features ===
- Double Mountains, county high point and most topographically prominent point for almost 160 miles (260 km)
- The Brazos River begins in Stonewall County at the confluence of the Double Mountain Fork and Salt Fork Brazos River, about 3 miles (4.8 km) west of Jud, Texas, now a ghost town.
- Kiowa Peak 3 mi (4.8 km) to the west of the Brazos River

=== Adjacent counties ===
- King County (north)
- Haskell County (east)
- Jones County (southeast)
- Fisher County (south)
- Kent County (west)

== Demographics ==
Historical population
Census	Pop.	Note	%±
1880	104		—
1890	1,024		884.6%
1900	2,183		113.2%
1910	5,320		143.7%
1920	4,086		−23.2%
1930	5,667		38.7%
1940	5,589		−1.4%
1950	3,679		−34.2%
1960	3,017		−18.0%
1970	2,397		−20.6%
1980	2,406		0.4%
1990	2,013		−16.3%
2000	1,693		−15.9%
2010	1,490		−12.0%
2020	1,245		−16.4%
2025 (est.)	1,186	▼	−4.7%
U.S. Decennial Census; 1850–2010 2010 2020

=== Racial and ethnic composition ===
Stonewall County, Texas – Racial and ethnic composition Note: the US Census treats Hispanic/Latino as an ethnic category. This table excludes Latinos from the racial categories and assigns them to a separate category. Hispanics/Latinos may be of any race.
Race / Ethnicity (NH = Non-Hispanic)	Pop 2000	Pop 2010	Pop 2020	% 2000	% 2010	% 2020
White alone (NH)	1,412	1,206	958	83.40%	80.94%	76.95%
Black or African American alone (NH)	48	38	18	2.84%	2.55%	1.45%
Native American or Alaska Native alone (NH)	6	4	3	0.35%	0.27%	0.24%
Asian alone (NH)	6	14	5	0.35%	0.94%	0.40%
Pacific Islander alone (NH)	0	0	0	0.00%	0.00%	0.00%
Other race alone (NH)	0	0	2	0.00%	0.00%	0.16%
Mixed or multiracial (NH)	22	19	33	1.30%	1.28%	2.65%
Hispanic or Latino (any race)	199	209	226	11.75%	14.03%	18.15%
Total	1,693	1,490	1,245	100.00%	100.00%	100.00%

=== 2020 census ===
As of the 2020 census, the county had a population of 1,245. The median age was 53.0 years. 19.4% of residents were under the age of 18 and 30.4% of residents were 65 years of age or older. For every 100 females there were 91.5 males, and for every 100 females age 18 and over there were 93.6 males age 18 and over.

There were 550 households in the county, of which 27.5% had children under the age of 18 living in them. Of all households, 53.3% were married-couple households, 17.6% were households with a male householder and no spouse or partner present, and 26.4% were households with a female householder and no spouse or partner present. About 30.0% of all households were made up of individuals and 19.1% had someone living alone who was 65 years of age or older.

There were 840 housing units, of which 34.5% were vacant. Among occupied housing units, 81.6% were owner-occupied and 18.4% were renter-occupied. The homeowner vacancy rate was 0.7% and the rental vacancy rate was 5.6%.

The racial makeup of the county was 82.9% White, 1.6% Black or African American, 0.8% American Indian and Alaska Native, 0.4% Asian, <0.1% Native Hawaiian and Pacific Islander, 5.3% from some other race, and 9.0% from two or more races. Hispanic or Latino residents of any race comprised 18.2% of the population.

<0.1% of residents lived in urban areas, while 100.0% lived in rural areas.

=== 2010 census ===
As of the 2010 census, 1,490 people, 642 households, and 426 families resided in the county. The population density was 2.0 people per square mile (0.77 people/km^{2}). The 928 housing units averaged 1 unit per square mile (0.39 units/km^{2}). The racial makeup of the county was 87.7% White, 2.6% Black or African American, 0.5% Native American, 0.9% Asian, 6.3% from other races, and 1.9% from two or more races. About 14.0% of the population was Hispanic or Latino of any race.

Of the 642 households, 24% had children under 18 living with them, 53% were married couples living together, 10.1% had a female householder with no husband present, and 33.6% were not families; 15.7% had someone living alone who was 65 or older. The average household size was 2.28 and the average family size was 2.83.

In the county, the population was distributed as 22.8% under 18, 6.2% from 18 to 24, 22.6% from 25 to 44, 24.5% from 45 to 64, and 24.0% who were 65 or older. The median age was 44 years. For every 100 females, there were 90.0 males. For every 100 females 18 and over, there were 91.1 males.

The median income for a household in the county was $27,935, and for a family was $35,571. Males had a median income of $27,083 versus $15,000 for females. The per capita income for the county was $16,094. About 14.80% of families and 19.30% of the population were below the poverty line, including 31.50% of those under 18 and 14.50% of those 65 or over.

== Communities ==
=== Town ===
- Aspermont (county seat)

=== Unincorporated communities ===
- Old Glory
- Peacock
- Swenson

=== Ghost town ===
- Rath City

== Transportation ==
=== Major highways ===
- U.S. Highway 83
- U.S. Highway 380
- State Highway 70
- State Highway 283
- Loop 128

=== Air ===
The county is served by Stonewall County Airport, a public airport located in Aspermont, 1 nautical mile (1.9 km) northeast of the central business district.

== Politics ==
Whereas the counties to its north in the Panhandle proper became overwhelmingly Republican at the presidential level with Dwight D. Eisenhower in the 1950s, Stonewall County continued to favor the Democratic Party for another four decades, even being narrowly won by Walter Mondale in 1984 when he came within 3,819 votes of losing all fifty states. During the twentieth century the only Republican to carry Stonewall County was Richard Nixon in 1972 – it was one of the few Baptist Bible Belt counties that stayed loyal to the anti-Prohibition Catholic Al Smith in 1928 when Texas voted Republican for the first time in its history.

Like the rest of the Bible Belt, due to opposition to the Democratic Party's liberal positions on social issues Stonewall County has trended powerfully Republican and in the last five elections the Republican nominee has won more than 62 percent of the vote – more than Nixon won in his 3,000-plus-county landslide in 1972.

Republican Drew Springer, Jr., a businessman from Muenster in Cooke County, represented Stonewall County in the Texas House of Representatives from January 2013, and as of January 2021, represents District 30 in the Texas Senate.

Stonewall County is located within District 69 of the Texas House of Representatives. Stonewall County is located within District 28 of the Texas Senate.

United States presidential election results for Stonewall County, Texas
Year	Republican		Democratic		Third party(ies)	
Year	No.	%	No.	%	No.	%
1912	7	1.46%	341	71.19%	131	27.35%
1916	21	3.27%	502	78.19%	119	18.54%
1920	134	24.50%	356	65.08%	57	10.42%
1924	171	16.03%	778	72.91%	118	11.06%
1928	442	46.92%	500	53.08%	0	0.00%
1932	50	4.87%	976	95.13%	0	0.00%
1936	59	5.56%	1,001	94.34%	1	0.09%
1940	156	11.75%	1,172	88.25%	0	0.00%
1944	89	8.24%	902	83.52%	89	8.24%
1948	65	6.11%	968	90.98%	31	2.91%
1952	319	27.57%	836	72.26%	2	0.17%
1956	306	26.89%	829	72.85%	3	0.26%
1960	306	26.09%	864	73.66%	3	0.26%
1964	219	18.27%	978	81.57%	2	0.17%
1968	213	19.19%	635	57.21%	262	23.60%
1972	662	61.58%	394	36.65%	19	1.77%
1976	252	23.55%	812	75.89%	6	0.56%
1980	488	40.03%	719	58.98%	12	0.98%
1984	599	48.15%	643	51.69%	2	0.16%
1988	421	36.70%	724	63.12%	2	0.17%
1992	242	21.51%	561	49.87%	322	28.62%
1996	323	35.22%	487	53.11%	107	11.67%
2000	496	62.08%	294	36.80%	9	1.13%
2004	499	66.36%	250	33.24%	3	0.40%
2008	524	71.29%	206	28.03%	5	0.68%
2012	507	75.11%	160	23.70%	8	1.19%
2016	555	79.17%	135	19.26%	11	1.57%
2020	615	83.56%	116	15.76%	5	0.68%
2024	604	84.36%	110	15.36%	2	0.28%

United States Senate election results for Stonewall County, Texas1
Year	Republican		Democratic		Third party(ies)	
Year	No.	%	No.	%	No.	%
2024	581	81.60%	120	16.85%	11	1.54%

United States Senate election results for Stonewall County, Texas2
Year	Republican		Democratic		Third party(ies)	
Year	No.	%	No.	%	No.	%
2020	586	82.07%	122	17.09%	6	0.84%

Texas Gubernatorial election results for Stonewall County
Year	Republican		Democratic		Third party(ies)	
Year	No.	%	No.	%	No.	%
2022	492	87.08%	70	12.39%	3	0.53%

== Education ==
School districts include:

- Aspermont Independent School District
- Hamlin Independent School District
- Haskell Consolidated Independent School District
- Rotan Independent School District
- Rule Independent School District

The Texas Legislature designated the county as being in the Western Texas College District.
