= Aspermont, Texas =

- Town
- Former bank and community center southwest of the Stonewall County Courthouse in Aspermont, Texas
- Interactive map of Aspermont, Texas
- Coordinates: 33°07′50″N 100°13′32″W
- Country: United States
- State: Texas
- County: Stonewall

Area
  - Total: 2.07 sq mi (5.37 km^{2})
  - Land: 2.05 sq mi (5.32 km^{2})
  - Water: 0.019 sq mi (0.05 km^{2})
- Elevation: 1,775 ft (541 m)

Population (2020)
  - Total: 789
  - Density: 384.1/sq mi (148.31/km^{2})
- Time zone: UTC−6 (Central (CST))
  - Summer (DST): UTC−5 (CDT)
- ZIP code: 79502
- Area code: 940
- FIPS code: 48-04408
- GNIS feature ID: 2411650
- Website: https://cityofaspermont.com/

Aspermont is a town in and the county seat of Stonewall County, Texas, United States. Its population was 789 at the 2020 census.

== History ==
The town was established in 1889.

== Geography ==
According to the United States Census Bureau, the town has a total area of 2.1 square miles (5.4 km^{2}), all land.

=== Climate ===
According to the Köppen climate classification, Aspermont has a humid subtropical climate, Cfa on climate maps. The hottest temperature recorded in Aspermont was 117 °F (47.2 °C) on June 28, 1994, while the coldest temperature recorded was −10 °F (−23.3 °C) on December 23, 1989.

Climate data for Aspermont, Texas, 1991–2020 normals, extremes 1962–present
Month	Jan	Feb	Mar	Apr	May	Jun	Jul	Aug	Sep	Oct	Nov	Dec	Year
Record high °F (°C)	87 (31)	94 (34)	101 (38)	111 (44)	113 (45)	117 (47)	114 (46)	113 (45)	109 (43)	108 (42)	92 (33)	89 (32)	117 (47)
Mean maximum °F (°C)	78.6 (25.9)	82.9 (28.3)	89.8 (32.1)	95.5 (35.3)	101.1 (38.4)	103.2 (39.6)	105.2 (40.7)	104.4 (40.2)	100.2 (37.9)	94.6 (34.8)	84.5 (29.2)	78.4 (25.8)	107.3 (41.8)
Mean daily maximum °F (°C)	56.3 (13.5)	60.4 (15.8)	68.9 (20.5)	78.0 (25.6)	85.8 (29.9)	92.9 (33.8)	96.8 (36.0)	96.0 (35.6)	87.9 (31.1)	78.3 (25.7)	66.0 (18.9)	57.3 (14.1)	77.1 (25.0)
Daily mean °F (°C)	42.9 (6.1)	46.4 (8.0)	54.5 (12.5)	63.0 (17.2)	72.2 (22.3)	80.3 (26.8)	84.0 (28.9)	83.1 (28.4)	75.2 (24.0)	64.5 (18.1)	52.5 (11.4)	44.2 (6.8)	63.6 (17.5)
Mean daily minimum °F (°C)	29.4 (−1.4)	32.3 (0.2)	40.1 (4.5)	47.9 (8.8)	58.5 (14.7)	67.7 (19.8)	71.3 (21.8)	70.1 (21.2)	62.4 (16.9)	50.7 (10.4)	38.9 (3.8)	31.1 (−0.5)	50.0 (10.0)
Mean minimum °F (°C)	15.6 (−9.1)	18.0 (−7.8)	23.3 (−4.8)	32.6 (0.3)	42.8 (6.0)	57.7 (14.3)	64.0 (17.8)	62.1 (16.7)	48.8 (9.3)	33.8 (1.0)	22.8 (−5.1)	16.9 (−8.4)	11.2 (−11.6)
Record low °F (°C)	−1 (−18)	−5 (−21)	9 (−13)	23 (−5)	33 (1)	45 (7)	56 (13)	48 (9)	34 (1)	17 (−8)	11 (−12)	−10 (−23)	−10 (−23)
Average precipitation inches (mm)	0.98 (25)	1.22 (31)	1.65 (42)	1.70 (43)	3.07 (78)	3.39 (86)	2.06 (52)	2.71 (69)	2.48 (63)	1.89 (48)	1.33 (34)	1.12 (28)	23.60 (599)
Average snowfall inches (cm)	0.8 (2.0)	1.6 (4.1)	0.0 (0.0)	0.1 (0.25)	0.0 (0.0)	0.0 (0.0)	0.0 (0.0)	0.0 (0.0)	0.0 (0.0)	0.1 (0.25)	0.8 (2.0)	0.7 (1.8)	4.1 (10.4)
Average precipitation days (≥ 0.01 in)	4.3	4.9	4.8	4.8	7.1	6.9	4.9	6.1	5.8	5.1	4.2	3.9	62.8
Average snowy days (≥ 0.1 in)	0.4	0.6	0.1	0.0	0.0	0.0	0.0	0.0	0.0	0.1	0.3	0.5	2.0
Source 1: NOAA
Source 2: National Weather Service

== Demographics ==
Historical population
Census	Pop.	Note	%±
1890	205		—
1920	436		—
1930	769		76.4%
1940	1,041		35.4%
1950	1,062		2.0%
1960	1,286		21.1%
1970	1,198		−6.8%
1980	1,357		13.3%
1990	1,214		−10.5%
2000	1,021		−15.9%
2010	919		−10.0%
2020	789		−14.1%
U.S. Decennial Census

=== 2020 census ===
Aspermont racial composition (NH = Non-Hispanic) (Note: Note: the US Census treats Hispanic/Latino as an ethnic category. This table excludes Latinos from the racial categories and assigns them to a separate category. Hispanics/Latinos can be of any race.)
Race	Number	Percentage
White (NH)	546	69.2%
Black or African American (NH)	16	2.03%
Native American or Alaska Native (NH)	3	0.38%
Asian (NH)	5	0.63%
Some Other Race (NH)	2	0.25%
Mixed/multiracial (NH)	18	2.28%
Hispanic or Latino	199	25.22%
Total	789	

As of the 2020 United States census, 789 people, 372 households, and 277 families resided in the town.

=== 2000 census ===
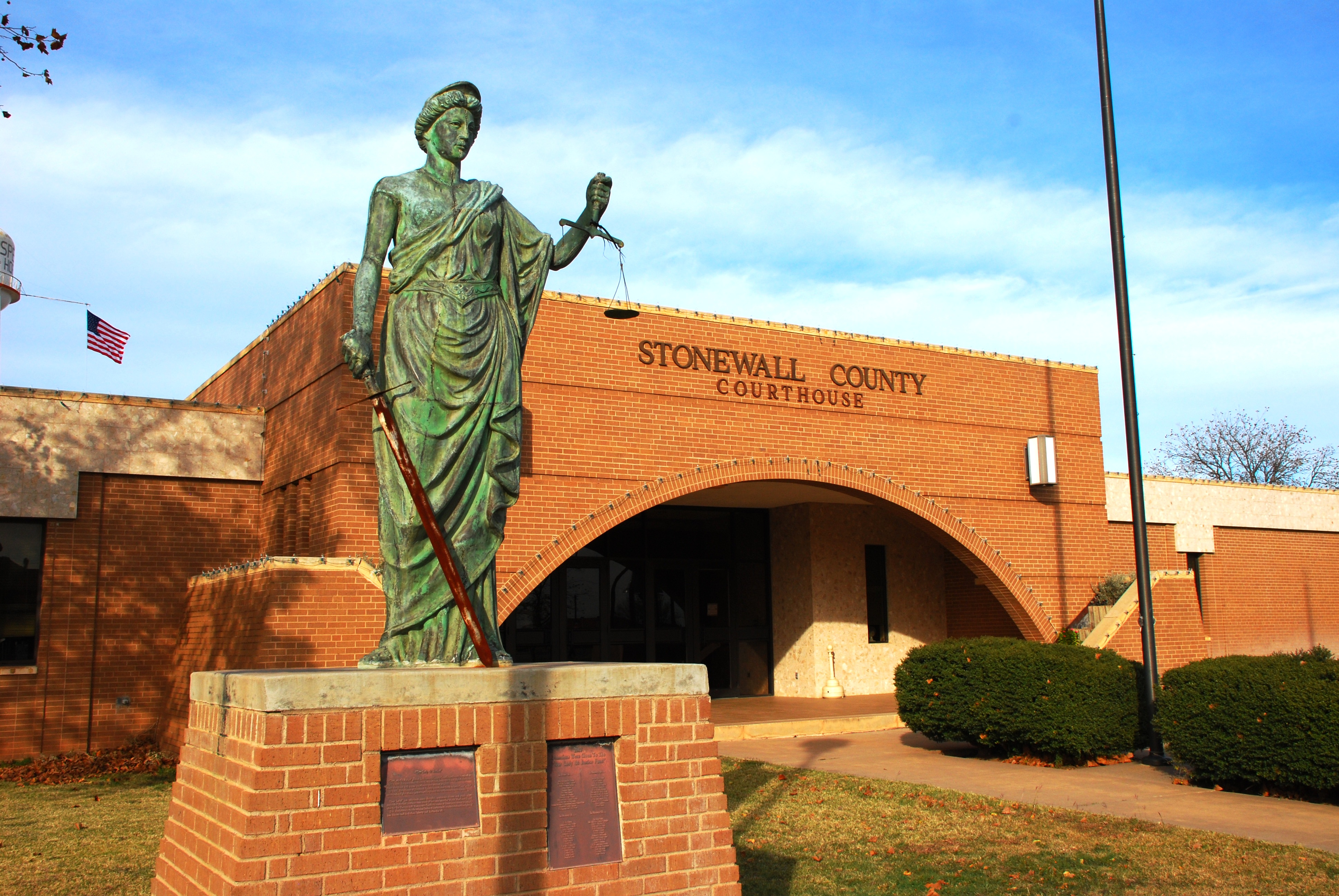
Stonewall county courthouse

At the 2000 census, 1,021 people, 418 households, and 282 families were living in the town. The population density was 493.2 people/sq mi (190.4/km^{2}). The 507 housing units averaged 244.9/sq mi (94.6/km^{2}). The racial makeup of the town was 85.99% White, 4.31% African American, 0.10% Native American, 0.39% Asian, 7.25% from other races, and 1.96% from two or more races. Hispanics or Latinos of any race were 13.12%.

Of the 418 households, 27.5% had children under 18 living with them, 52.4% were married couples living together, 11.7% had a female householder with no husband present, and 32.3% were not families. About 30.1% of households were one person, and 15.6% were one person 65 or older. The average household size was 2.34, and the average family size was 2.90.

The age distribution was 23.4% under 18, 7.2% from 18 to 24, 23.4% from 25 to 44, 23.5% from 45 to 64, and 22.4% 65 or older. The median age was 41 years. For every 100 females, there were 82.6 males. For every 100 females 18 and over, there were 81.0 males.

The median household income was $25,893.89 and the median family income was $31,172. Males had a median income of $24,904 versus $13,971 for females. The per capita income for the town was $14,060. About 17.1% of families and 22.3% of the population were below the poverty line, including 37.5% of those under 18 and 11.5% of those 65 or over. Citizens over 85 had a median income of $7,937.07.

== Notable people ==
- John Ray Godfrey, baseball player
- Peter Hart, football player
- R. D. Matthews, criminal

== Education ==
The Town of Aspermont is served by the Aspermont Independent School District and home to the Aspermont High School Hornets.

== Transportation ==
=== Highways ===
- U.S. Route 83
- U.S. Route 380
- Farm to Market 610
- Farm to Market 1263
- Farm to Market 2211
- Farm to Market 3457

=== Air ===
Stonewall County Airport is a public airport is located in Aspermont, 1 nautical mile (1.9 km) northeast of the central business district. The airport is owned by Stonewall County and is used solely for general aviation purposes.
