= Haskell County, Texas =

County in Texas, United States

- County
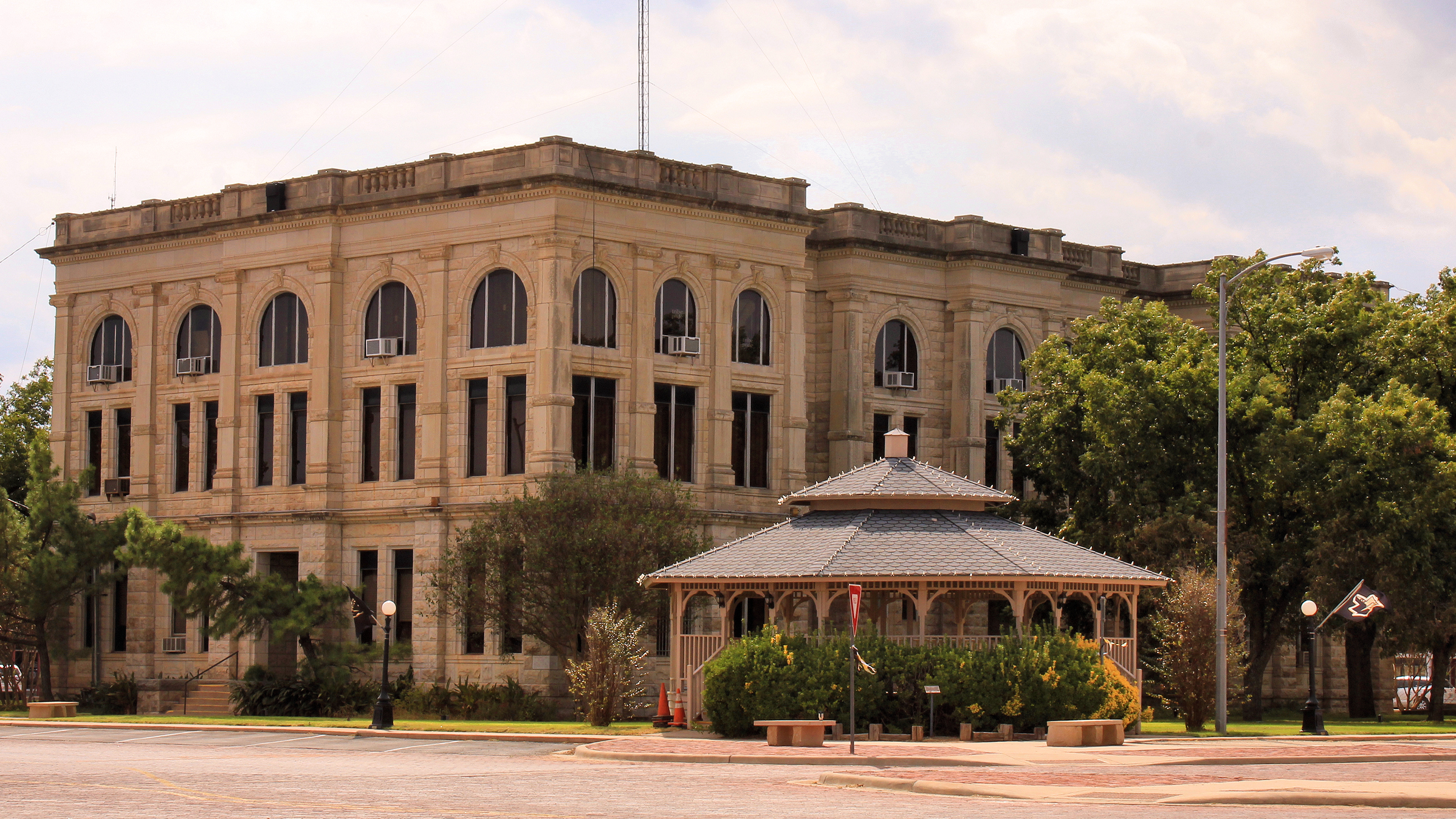
- The Haskell County Courthouse

- Location within the U.S. state of Texas
- Coordinates: 33°11′N 99°44′W
- Country: United States
- State: Texas
- Founded: 1885
- Named for: Charles Ready Haskell
- Seat: Haskell
- Largest city: Haskell

Area
  - Total: 910 sq mi (2,400 km^{2})
  - Land: 903 sq mi (2,340 km^{2})
  - Water: 7.1 sq mi (18 km^{2}) 0.8%

Population (2020)
  - Total: 5,416
  - Estimate (2025): 5,499 ▲
  - Density: 6/sq mi (2.3/km^{2})
- Time zone: UTC−6 (Central)
  - Summer (DST): UTC−5 (CDT)
- Congressional district: 19th
- Website: www.haskellcountytx.gov

Haskell County is a county located in the U.S. state of Texas. As of the 2020 census, its population was 5,416. The county seat is Haskell. The county was created in 1858 and later organized in 1885. It is named for Charles Ready Haskell, who was killed in the Goliad massacre.

== Geography ==
According to the U.S. Census Bureau, the county has a total area of 910 square miles (2,400 km^{2}), of which 903 square miles (2,340 km^{2}) are land and 7.1 square miles (18 km^{2}) (0.8%) are covered by water.

=== Major highways ===
- U.S. Highway 277
- U.S. Highway 380
- State Highway 6
- State Highway 222
- State Highway 283

=== Adjacent counties ===
- Knox County (north)
- Throckmorton County (east)
- Shackelford County (southeast)
- Jones County (south)
- Stonewall County (west)
- Baylor County (northeast)
- King County (northwest)

== Demographics ==
Historical population
Census	Pop.	Note	%±
1880	48		—
1890	1,665		3,368.8%
1900	2,637		58.4%
1910	16,249		516.2%
1920	14,193		−12.7%
1930	16,669		17.4%
1940	14,905		−10.6%
1950	13,736		−7.8%
1960	11,174		−18.7%
1970	8,512		−23.8%
1980	7,725		−9.2%
1990	6,820		−11.7%
2000	6,093		−10.7%
2010	5,899		−3.2%
2020	5,416		−8.2%
2025 (est.)	5,499	▲	1.5%
U.S. Decennial Census; 1850–2010 2010 2020

=== 2020 census ===
As of the 2020 census, the county had a population of 5,416 and a median age of 43.5 years. About 20.0% of residents were under 18 and 22.8% were 65 or older. For every 100 females, there were 109.3 males, and for every 100 females 18 and over, there were 110.4 males 18 and over.

The racial makeup of the county was 76.3% White, 3.8% Black or African American, 0.8% American Indian and Alaska Native, 0.5% Asian, 0.1% Native Hawaiian and Pacific Islander, 9.9% from some other race, and 8.6% from two or more races. Hispanic or Latino residents of any race comprised 25.4% of the population.

Almost all of the residents lived in urban areas rural areas.

Of the 2,112 households in the county, 27.0% had children under 18 living in them, 47.1% were married-couple households, 20.1% were households with a male householder and no spouse or partner present, and 28.3% were households with a female householder and no spouse or partner present. About 32.1% of all households were made up of individuals, and 16.4% had someone living alone who was 65 or older.

The county had 3,073 housing units, of which 31.3% were vacant. Among occupied housing units, 75.6% were owner-occupied and 24.4% were renter-occupied. The homeowner vacancy rate was 1.9% and the rental vacancy rate was 12.4%.

=== Racial and ethnic composition ===
Haskell County, Texas – Racial and ethnic composition Note: the US Census treats Hispanic/Latino as an ethnic category. This table excludes Latinos from the racial categories and assigns them to a separate category. Hispanics/Latinos may be of any race.
Race / Ethnicity (NH = Non-Hispanic)	Pop 1980	Pop 1990	Pop 2000	Pop 2010	Pop 2020	% 1980	% 1990	% 2000	% 2010	% 2020
White alone (NH)	6,149	5,229	4,600	4,148	3,628	79.60%	76.67%	75.50%	70.32%	66.99%
Black or African American alone (NH)	344	239	160	203	181	4.45%	3.50%	2.63%	3.44%	3.34%
Native American or Alaska Native alone (NH)	17	15	19	25	28	0.22%	0.22%	0.31%	0.42%	0.52%
Asian alone (NH)	12	16	9	31	22	0.16%	0.23%	0.15%	0.53%	0.41%
Native Hawaiian or Pacific Islander alone (NH)	x	x	1	0	5	x	x	0.02%	0.00%	0.09%
Other race alone (NH)	8	9	5	3	24	0.10%	0.13%	0.08%	0.05%	0.44%
Mixed race or Multiracial (NH)	x	x	50	75	151	x	x	0.82%	1.27%	2.79%
Hispanic or Latino (any race)	1,195	1,312	1,249	1,414	1,377	15.47%	19.24%	20.50%	23.97%	25.42%
Total	7,725	6,820	6,093	5,899	5,416	100.00%	100.00%	100.00%	100.00%	100.00%

=== 2000 census ===
As of the 2000 census, 6,093 people, 2,569 households, and 1,775 families resided in the county. The population density was 8 people per square mile (3.1 people/km^{2}). The 3,555 housing units averaged 4 units per square mile (1.5/km^{2}). The racial makeup of the county was 82.78% White, 2.79% Black or African American, 0.54% Native American, 0.15% Asian, 0.02% Pacific Islander, 11.67% from other races, and 2.05% from two or more races. About 20% of the population was Hispanic or Latino of any race.

Of the 2,569 households, 27.4% had children under 18 living with them, 57.6% were married couples living together, 8.8% had a female householder with no husband present, and 30.9% were not families. About 29.4% of all households were made up of individuals, and 18.3% had someone living alone who was 65 or older. The average household size was 2.33, and the average family size was 2.86.

In the county, the age distribution was 23.7% under 18, 5.7% from 18 to 24, 22.1% from 25 to 44, 22.9% from 45 to 64, and 25.5% who were 65 or older. The median age was 44 years. For every 100 females, there were 88.9 males. For every 100 females 18 and over, there were 86.3 males.

The median income in the county for a household was $23,690 and for a family was $29,506. Males had a median income of $23,542 versus $16,418 for females. The per capita income for the county was $14,918. About 16.9% of families and 22.8% of the population were below the poverty line, including 34.0% of those under 18 and 15.4% of those 65 or over.

== Communities ==
=== Cities ===
- Haskell (county seat)
- O'Brien
- Stamford (small part in Jones County)
- Weinert

=== Towns ===
- Rochester
- Rule

=== Unincorporated communities ===
- Paint Creek
- Sagerton

=== Ghost town ===
- Jud

== Politics ==
Haskell County is the home county of former Texas Governor Rick Perry. Republican Drew Springer, Jr., a businessman from Muenster in Cooke County, has represented Haskell County in the Texas House of Representatives since January 2013. Haskell County was once a Democratic bastion, voting for the Democratic nominee for president in every election from its founding through 1996, with the exceptions of the 1972 and 1984 Republican landslides. In 2000, it broke its Democratic heritage by voting for Republican nominee George W. Bush. Since then, the county has taken a sharp Republican turn, moving rightward in every subsequent election as of 2020. In 2020, Haskell gave 83.1 percent of the vote to Republican nominee Donald Trump, the highest ever Republican vote share in the county, and just 15.9 percent of the vote to Democratic nominee Joe Biden, the lowest ever Democratic vote share in the county.

Haskell County is located within District 69 of the Texas House of Representatives. Haskell County is located within District 28 of the Texas Senate.

United States presidential election results for Haskell County, Texas
Year	Republican		Democratic		Third party(ies)	
Year	No.	%	No.	%	No.	%
1912	45	3.08%	1,016	69.49%	401	27.43%
1916	95	5.70%	1,200	72.03%	371	22.27%
1920	254	15.52%	1,127	68.85%	256	15.64%
1924	428	16.42%	2,050	78.66%	128	4.91%
1928	1,430	48.08%	1,532	51.51%	12	0.40%
1932	154	6.16%	2,330	93.20%	16	0.64%
1936	156	5.43%	2,713	94.46%	3	0.10%
1940	405	12.09%	2,941	87.79%	4	0.12%
1944	261	8.47%	2,573	83.46%	249	8.08%
1948	181	6.04%	2,735	91.20%	83	2.77%
1952	1,290	34.15%	2,481	65.69%	6	0.16%
1956	993	29.72%	2,340	70.04%	8	0.24%
1960	866	23.73%	2,776	76.05%	8	0.22%
1964	512	14.97%	2,903	84.86%	6	0.18%
1968	713	22.20%	1,888	58.80%	610	19.00%
1972	1,744	64.74%	950	35.26%	0	0.00%
1976	838	24.95%	2,512	74.78%	9	0.27%
1980	1,447	42.11%	1,951	56.78%	38	1.11%
1984	1,701	53.98%	1,434	45.51%	16	0.51%
1988	1,193	40.93%	1,715	58.83%	7	0.24%
1992	852	29.86%	1,438	50.40%	563	19.73%
1996	966	37.56%	1,374	53.42%	232	9.02%
2000	1,488	50.84%	1,401	47.86%	38	1.30%
2004	1,539	63.70%	867	35.89%	10	0.41%
2008	1,388	65.60%	699	33.03%	29	1.37%
2012	1,424	70.74%	553	27.47%	36	1.79%
2016	1,403	79.27%	314	17.74%	53	2.99%
2020	1,840	83.11%	353	15.94%	21	0.95%
2024	1,918	85.36%	313	13.93%	16	0.71%

United States Senate election results for Haskell County, Texas1
Year	Republican		Democratic		Third party(ies)	
Year	No.	%	No.	%	No.	%
2024	1,826	81.74%	363	16.25%	45	2.01%

United States Senate election results for Haskell County, Texas2
Year	Republican		Democratic		Third party(ies)	
Year	No.	%	No.	%	No.	%
2020	1,808	82.82%	347	15.90%	28	1.28%

Texas Gubernatorial election results for Haskell County
Year	Republican		Democratic		Third party(ies)	
Year	No.	%	No.	%	No.	%
2022	1,465	87.72%	191	11.44%	14	0.84%

== Education ==
School districts serving sections of the county include:

- Haskell Consolidated Independent School District
- Knox City-O'Brien Consolidated Independent School District
- Munday Consolidated Independent School District
- Paint Creek Independent School District
- Rule Independent School District
- Stamford Independent School District

Goree Independent School District formerly served sections of the county. On July 1, 2003, it merged into Munday CISD.

The county is in the service area of Vernon College.

== See also ==
- Double Mountain Fork Brazos River
- Recorded Texas Historic Landmarks in Haskell County
