= Sagerton, Texas =

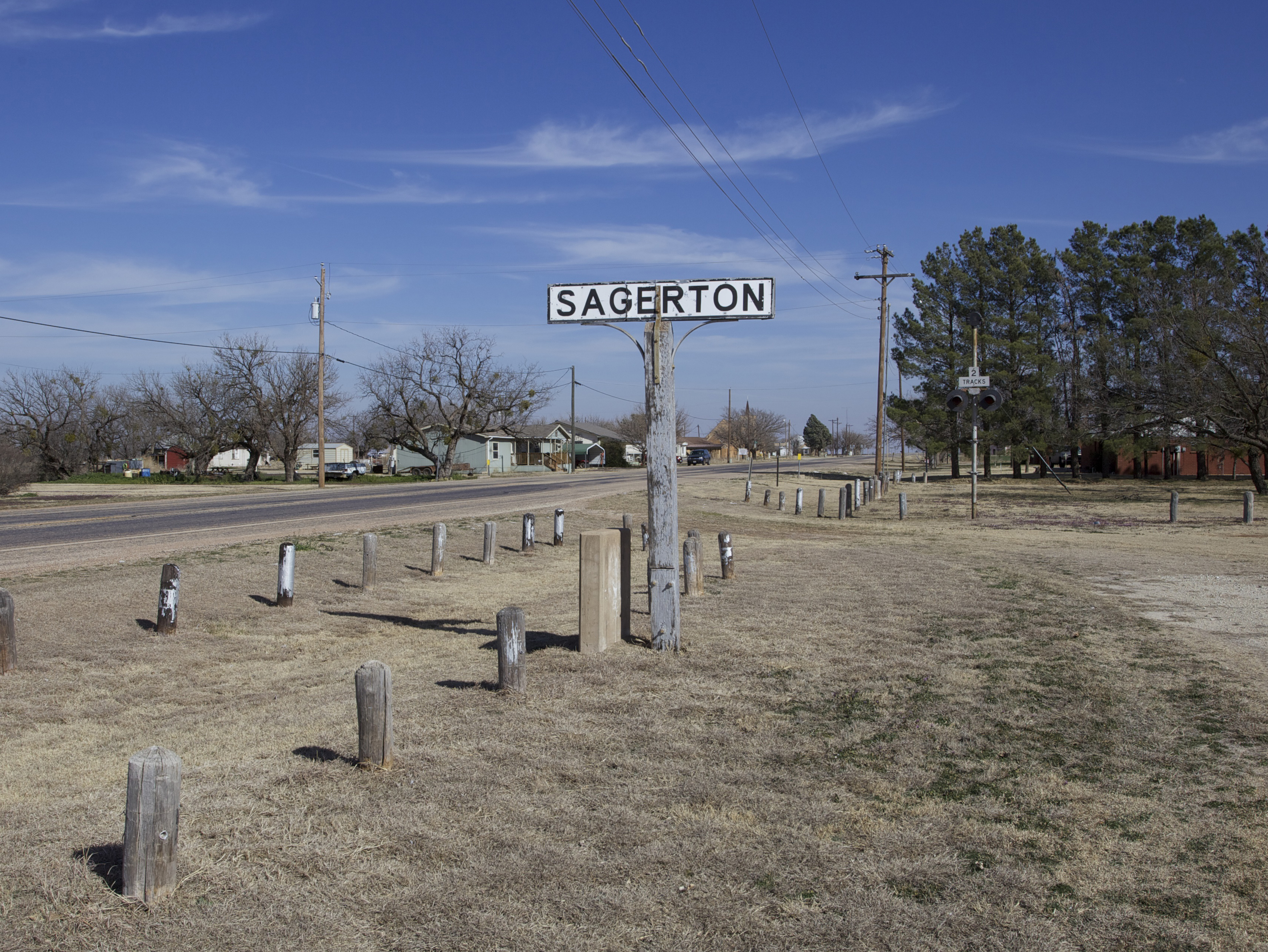
- Rail station sign in Sagerton.

- Location within Texas Location within the United States
- Coordinates: 33°04′37″N 99°57′20″W
- Country: United States
- State: Texas
- County: Haskell
- Established: 1905
- Elevation: 1,634 ft (498 m)

Population (2000)
  - Total: 115
- Time zone: UTC-6 (Central (CST))
  - Summer (DST): UTC-5 (CDT)
- ZIP code: 79548
- Area code: 940
- GNIS feature ID: 1345836

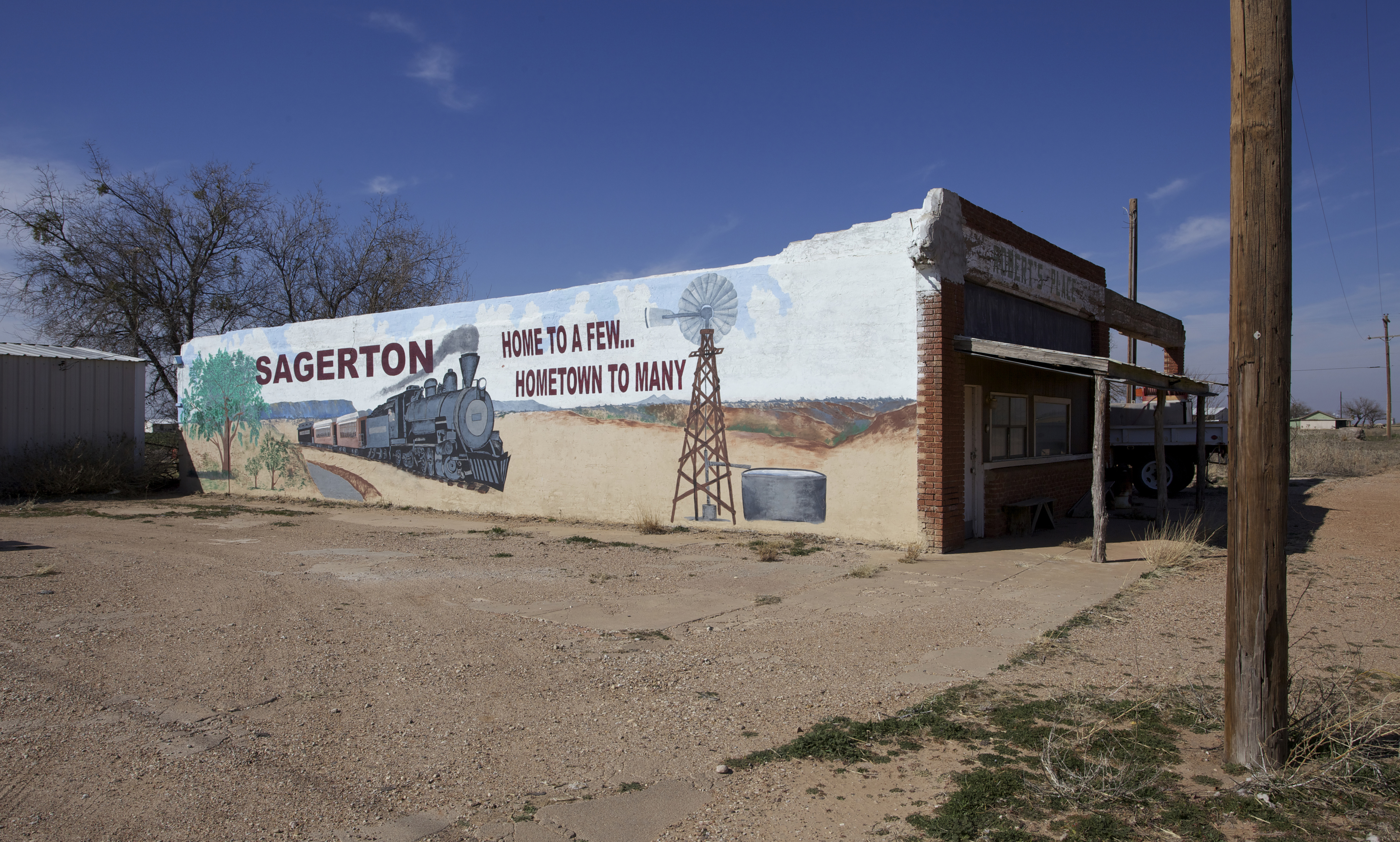
Mural in Sagerton

Sagerton is an unincorporated community in Haskell County, Texas, United States.

== History ==
According to the Handbook of Texas, the community was established in 1905 and named for W. M. Sager, the townsite donor. It was a shipping point for locally grown agricultural products such as cotton, cattle, and poultry on the newly constructed Kansas City, Mexico and Orient Railway. Beginning in 1909, the Stamford and Northwestern Railway, stretching from Stamford to Spur, also provided rail service. Fires in 1917 and 1926 caused extensive property damage, and the town's bank, organized in 1908, failed in 1931.

== Geography ==
Sagerton is located at the intersection of Texas State Highway 283 and Farm to Market Road 1661 in the Rolling Plains region of West Texas, about 2 miles (3.2 km) to the east of the Double Mountain Fork, a major tributary of the upper Brazos River. The Double Mountain Fork and the Salt Fork merge to form the Brazos River (proper) just 15 miles (24 km) to the north of Sagerton.

== Population ==
Sagerton was never a large town. The population rose to 300 in 1940 and fell to 115 in 1980. According to the 2000 Census, the estimated population of Sagerton has remained at around 115 residents.
