= Aspermont High School =

Location
- 300 7th St. Aspermont, Texas 79502-0549; United States
- Coordinates: 33°8′19″N 100°13′20″W

Information
- School type: Public High School
- School district: Aspermont Independent School District
- Staff: 12.73 (FTE)
- Grades: 6-12
- Enrollment: 98 (2023–2024)
- Student to teacher ratio: 7.70
- Colors: Red, black, and white
- Athletics conference: UIL Class A
- Mascot: Hornet
- Yearbook: Hornet
- Website: Aspermont High School

Aspermont High School is a public high school located in Aspermont, Texas (CSA) and classified as a 1A school by the UIL. It is part of the Aspermont Independent School District located in central Stonewall County.

The school building, which dates to 1966, was designed to double as a fallout shelter, and it also sees use as a tornado shelter.

In 2015, the school was rated "Met Standard" by the Texas Education Agency.

== Athletics ==
The Aspermont Hornets compete in these sports -

Volleyball, Cross Country, 6-Man Football, Basketball, Golf, Tennis & Track

=== State titles ===
- Boys Basketball
  - 1968(1A)

=== State finals appearances ===
- Football -
  - 1999(1A)
