= Aspermont Independent School District =

School district in Texas

Location
- 528 E Seventh St. Aspermont, Texas ESC Region 14 USA
- Coordinates: 33°8′18″N 100°13′19″W

District information
- Type: Independent school district
- Grades: Pre-K through 12
- Superintendent: Clifton Gilmore
- Schools: 2 (2009–10)
- NCES District ID: 4800006

Students and staff
- Students: 240 (2010–11)
- Teachers: 28.48 (2009–10) (on full-time equivalent (FTE) basis)
- Student–teacher ratio: 8.36 (2009–10)
- Athletic conference: UIL Class 1A 6-man Football Division II
- District mascot: Hornets
- Colors: Black, Crimson, White

Other information
- TEA District Accountability Rating for 2011–12: Recognized
- Website: Aspermont ISD

Aspermont Independent School District is a public school district based in Aspermont, Texas (USA). The district is located in Stonewall County.

== History ==
On July 1, 1985, Old Glory Independent School District merged into Aspermont ISD.

== Finances ==
As of the 2010–2011 school year, the appraised valuation of property in the district was $216,602,000. The maintenance tax rate was $0.104 and the bond tax rate was $0.000 per $100 of appraised valuation.

== Academic achievement ==
In 2011, the school district was rated "recognized" by the Texas Education Agency. Thirty-five percent of districts in Texas in 2011 received the same rating. No state accountability ratings will be given to districts in 2012. A school district in Texas can receive one of four possible rankings from the Texas Education Agency: Exemplary (the highest possible ranking), Recognized, Academically Acceptable, and Academically Unacceptable (the lowest possible ranking).

Historical district TEA accountability ratings

- 2011: Recognized
- 2010: Exemplary
- 2009: Recognized
- 2008: Recognized
- 2007: Recognized
- 2006: Recognized
- 2005: Recognized
- 2004: Recognized

== Schools ==
In the 2011–2012 school year, the district had students in two schools.

- Aspermont Junior High and High School (Grades 7-12)
- Aspermont Elementary School (Grades PK-6)

== Special programs ==
=== Athletics ===
Aspermont High School participates in the boys sports of basketball and football. The school participates in the girls sports of basketball, softball, and volleyball. For the 2012 through 2014 school years, Aspermont High School will play six-man football in UIL Class 1A 6-man Football Division II.

== See also ==
- List of school districts in Texas
- List of high schools in Texas
