= Rhineland, Texas =

- Unincorporated community
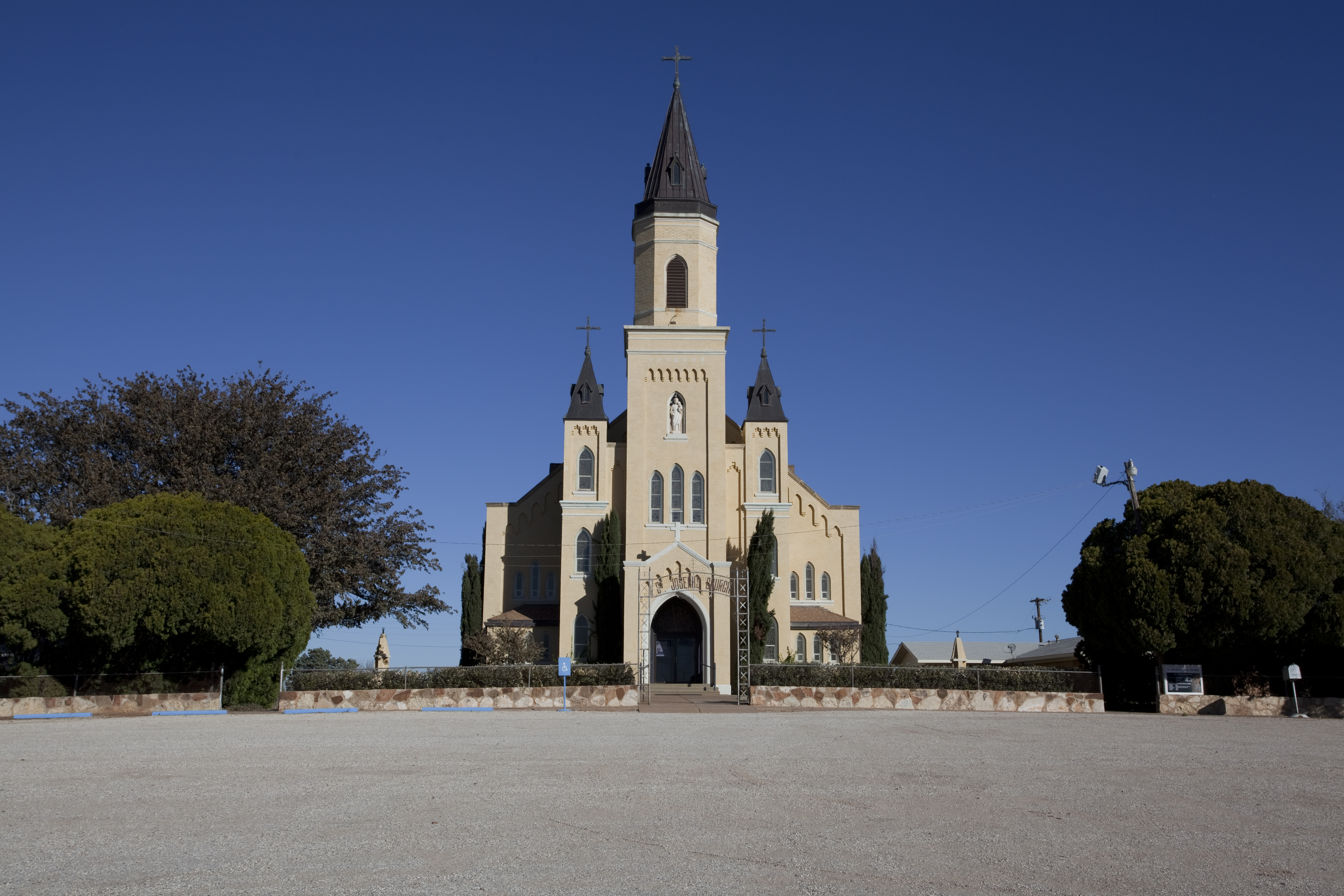
- St Joseph's Church in Rhineland

- Location within Texas Location within the United States
- Coordinates: 33°31′47″N 99°39′18″W
- Country: United States
- State: Texas
- County: Knox
- Region: Brazos River basin
- Established: 1895
- Elevation: 1,404 ft (428 m)

Population (2000)
  - Total: 100
- Time zone: UTC-6 (CST)
- ZIP code: 76371
- Area code: 940
- Website: Rhineland, Texas from the Handbook of Texas Online

Rhineland is an unincorporated community in Knox County, Texas, United States. According to the Handbook of Texas, the community had an estimated population of 100 in 2000.

== Geography ==
Rhineland is located within the physiographic region known as the Texas Rolling Plains, approximately 1 mi (1.6 km) south of the Brazos River at the intersection of Farm-to-Market roads 267 and 2534 in southeastern Knox County. It is situated 9 mi (14 km) to the southeast of the county seat of Benjamin, 6 mi (9.7 km) north of Munday, and 85 mi (137 km) north of Abilene.

=== Climate ===
According to the Köppen climate classification, Rhineland enjoys a semiarid climate, BSk on climate maps.

== History ==
The community was officially established on February 1, 1895, when the land contract between J.C. League and German-born Catholics – Father Joseph R. Reisdorff and Hugh Herchenbach – was notarized. The 12,000-acre (49 km^{2}) plot was advertised as a colony for German Catholics and was named after the Rhineland region in Germany. The first land sold was to John Bruckner at $8 an acre. John bought around 160 acres, but had 8,000 acres to choose from. The land he chose sits near the corner of FM 267 and CR 4260. The Rhineland Common School District was organized in 1898, with the first schoolhouse being built the following year. A larger, brick school building was constructed in 1926 that provided public education through high school. A number of students attended a local parochial school.

By 1950, Rhineland had around 75 residents. Over the years, the community experienced a slight rise in population, but the number of businesses declined. Rhineland's school district later consolidated with nearby Munday. In 1980, the estimated number of inhabitants in Rhineland was 196. That figure had fallen to 100 by 2000.

== Education ==
Public education in the community of Rhineland is provided by the Munday Consolidated Independent School District.

== See also ==
- Double Mountains (Texas)
- Double Mountain Fork Brazos River
- List of Texas rivers
- Saint Joseph
- Rhine (river of Germany)
- West Texas
