= Munday High School =

Public school in Texas, United States

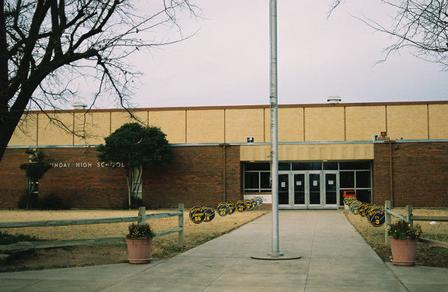
- Front entrance to Munday High School

Location
- 911 W D St. Munday, Texas 76371; United States; 33.45177°N 99.63052°W

Information
- School type: Public high school
- School district: Munday Consolidated Independent School District
- Principal: Trey Singleton
- Staff: 21.58 (FTE)
- Grades: 7-12
- Enrollment: 206 (2023-2024)
- Student to teacher ratio: 9.55
- Colors: Purple & Gold
- Athletics conference: UIL Class 2A
- Mascot: Moguls/Mogulettes
- Yearbook: Mogul
- Website: Munday High School

Munday High School is a public high school located in Munday, Texas (USA) and classified as a 2A school by the UIL. It is part of the Munday Consolidated Independent School District located in southeastern Knox County. In 2003, neighboring Goree High School in Goree, Texas was consolidated with Munday and all high school grades began attending Munday. Munday High School became known "officially" as Munday Secondary School not long after the merger with Goree. The Goree school became a junior high school for the district until 2009 when the school closed and those students were transferred to Munday. In 2015, the school was rated "Met Standard" by the Texas Education Agency.

== Unique Nickname ==
Munday Moguls - This name was adopted in 1925 in honor of fierce warriors who conquered part of India. The girls' teams are known as "Mogulettes."

== Athletics ==
The Munday Moguls compete in the following sports -

Cross Country, Volleyball, Football, Basketball, Golf, Tennis, & Track

=== State Titles ===
Munday (UIL)

- Girls Cross Country -
  - 1988(1A), 1989(1A)
- Football -
  - 1984(1A), 2007(1A/D1), 2012 (1A/D2)
- Boys Track -
  - 1985(1A), 1988(1A), 1990(1A), 1991(1A), 2011(1A), 2012(1A), 2013(1A)
- Girls Track -
  - 1988(1A), 1989(1A), 1990(1A), 1991(1A), 1999(1A)

Munday Dunbar (PVIL)

- Boys Track -
  - 1964(PVIL-B)

== Theatre ==
- One Act Play -
  - 1993(1A) - Daddy's Dyin',(Who's Got the Will?)

Munday High School has advanced to the State One Act Play Meet 9 times winning one State Championship (1993), finishing 2nd runner-up (1997) and 1st runner-up (2008).

== Band ==
- UIL Marching Band Sweepstakes Champion -
  - 1995(1A)

The Munday High School Purple Cloud Band has also won the Texas 1A Honor Band Competition twice, in 1994 and 2000.

== Academics ==
- UIL Journalism Champions
  - 1964(1A)
- UIL Team Debate Champions
  - 1965(1A), 1966(1A), 1969(1A)

== Notable alumni ==
- Glen Amerson (born November 24, 1938) was an American football defensive back for the Philadelphia Eagles of the National Football League.
- L. J. Collier is an American football defensive end for the Seattle Seahawks of the National Football League.
