= Knox City High School =

Public school in Texas, United States

Location
- 400 N. 4th St. Knox City, Texas 79529-9999; United States; 33.420926°N 99.814892°W

Information
- School type: Public high school
- Motto: Be Your Best and Nothing Less
- School district: Knox City-O'Brien Consolidated Independent School District
- Principal: Colin Howeth
- Teaching staff: 25.84 (FTE)
- Grades: 9-12
- Enrollment: 200 (2023-2024)
- Student to teacher ratio: 7.74
- Colors: Red and Blue
- Athletics conference: UIL Class A
- Mascot: Greyhound
- Yearbook: Greyhound
- Website: Knox City High School

Knox City High School is a public high school situated on the north edge of Knox City, Texas, United States, and classified as a 1A school by the UIL. It is part of the Knox City-O'Brien Consolidated Independent School District located in southwestern Knox County. In 2015, the school was rated "met standard" by the Texas Education Agency. The school was also mentioned on the hit Comedy Central show Tosh.0, after a promotional video for the school's six-man football team went viral.

== Athletics ==
The Knox City Greyhounds compete in:

- Baseball
- Basketball
- Six-man football
- Golf
- Tennis
- Track and field
- Volleyball

=== State titles ===
- Football - 1983 (1A) State champions
