= Knox City, Texas =

- Town
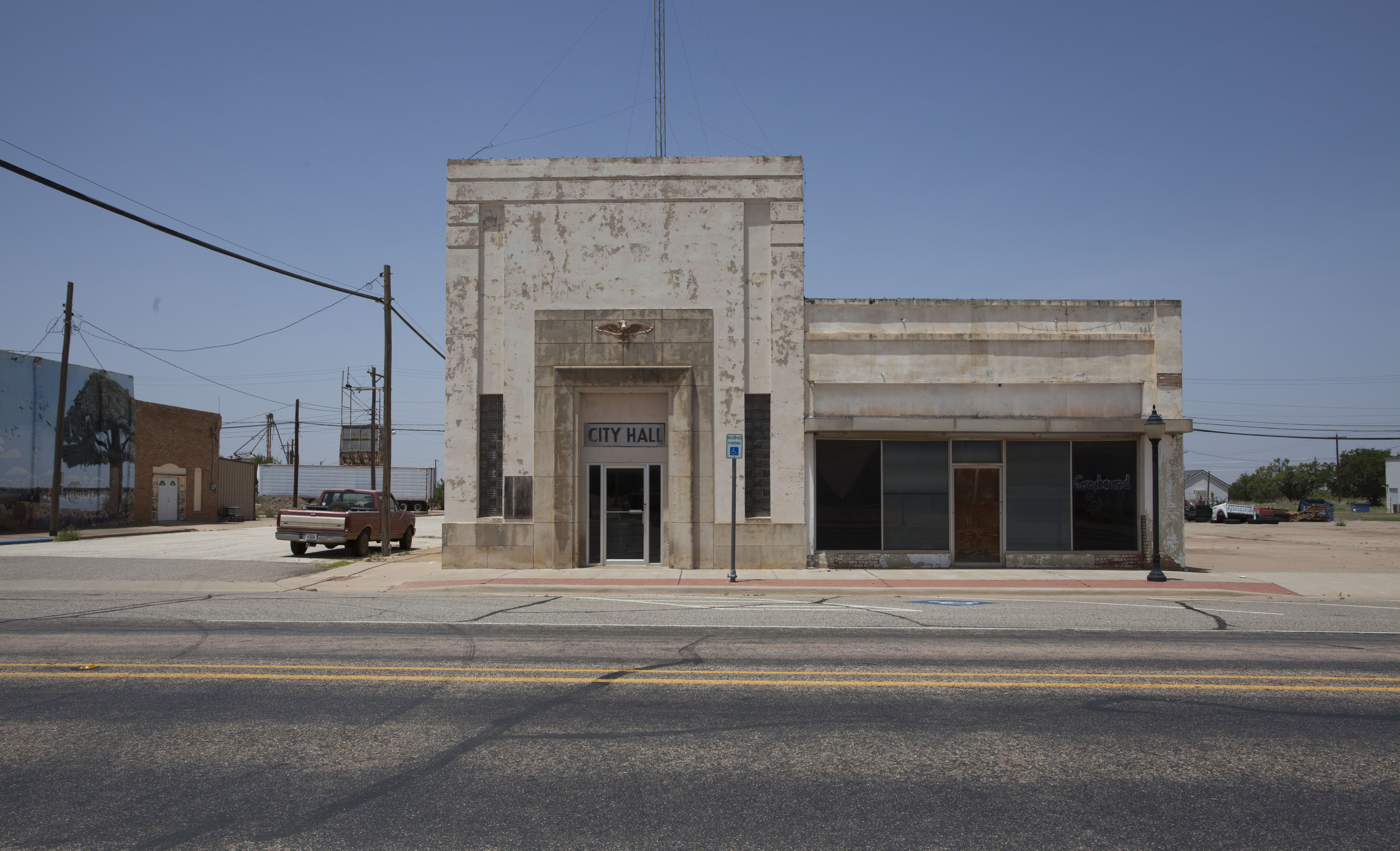
- Knox City Hall in Knox City

- Location within Texas Location within the United States
- Coordinates: 33°25′03″N 99°48′57″W
- Country: United States
- State: Texas
- County: Knox

Area
  - Total: 0.83 sq mi (2.16 km^{2})
  - Land: 0.83 sq mi (2.16 km^{2})
  - Water: 0 sq mi (0.00 km^{2})
- Elevation: 1,529 ft (466 m)

Population (2020)
  - Total: 1,065
  - Density: 1,280/sq mi (493/km^{2})
- Time zone: UTC-6 (Central (CST))
  - Summer (DST): UTC-5 (CDT)
- ZIP code: 79529
- Area code: 940
- FIPS code: 48-39700
- GNIS feature ID: 2412844
- Website: knoxcitytexas.gov

Knox City is a town in Knox County, Texas, United States. Its population was 1,065 at the 2020 census.

== Geography ==
Knox City is in southern Knox County, at the intersection of State Highways 6 and 222. SH 6 runs north 12 miles (19 km) to Benjamin, the county seat, and south 17 mi (27 km) to Rule, while SH 222 leads east 12 mi (19 km) to Munday and northwest 40 mi (64 km) to Guthrie. Abilene is 75 mi (121 km) to the south, and Wichita Falls is 88 mi (142 km) to the northeast.

Knox City is located on high ground 3.5 mi (5.6 km) from the upper Brazos River. According to the United States Census Bureau, Knox City has a total area of 0.85 square miles (2.2 km^{2}), all land.

=== Climate ===
The climate in this area is characterized by hot, humid summers and generally mild to cool winters. According to the Köppen climate classification, Knox City has a humid subtropical climate, Cfa on climate maps.

== Demographics ==
Historical population
Census	Pop.	Note	%±
1920	698		—
1930	906		29.8%
1940	1,127		24.4%
1950	1,489		32.1%
1960	1,805		21.2%
1970	1,536		−14.9%
1980	1,546		0.7%
1990	1,440		−6.9%
2000	1,219		−15.3%
2010	1,130		−7.3%
2020	1,065		−5.8%
U.S. Decennial Census

=== 2020 census ===
Knox City racial composition (NH = Non-Hispanic) (Note: Note: the US Census treats Hispanic/Latino as an ethnic category. This table excludes Latinos from the racial categories and assigns them to a separate category. Hispanics/Latinos can be of any race.)
Race	Number	Percentage
White (NH)	581	54.55%
Black or African American (NH)	45	4.23%
Native American or Alaska Native (NH)	4	0.38%
Asian (NH)	8	0.75%
Pacific Islander (NH)	3	0.28%
Mixed/multiracial (NH)	32	3.0%
Hispanic or Latino	392	36.81%
Total	1,065	

As of the 2020 United States census, 1,065 people, 427 households, and 259 families resided in the town.

=== 2010 census ===
As of the census of 2010, 1,130 people lived in the town, a decrease of 7.30% since 2000 (89 people). The racial makeup of the town was 73.54% White (831 people), 6.73% African American (76 people), 0.44% Native American (5 people), 0.18% Asian (2 people), 16.73% from other races (189 people), and 2.39% from two or more races (27 people). Hispanics or Latinos of any race were 30.44% of the population (344 people).

=== 2000 census ===
As of the census of 2000, 1,219 people, 486 households, and 320 families resided in the town. The population density was 1,457.3 inhabitants per square mile (562.7/km^{2}). The 613 housing units had an average density of 732.8 per square mile (282.9/km^{2}). The racial makeup of the town was 71.86% White, 8.70% African American, 0.66% Native American (8 people), 0.41% Asian, 0.08% Pacific Islander, 14.44% from other races, and 3.86% from two or more races. Hispanics or Latinos of any race were 23.54% of the population.

Of the 486 households, 28.8% had children under 18 living with them, 52.7% were married couples living together, 10.3% had a female householder with no husband present, and 34.0% were not families. About 31.9% of all households were made up of individuals, and 20.2% had someone living alone who was 65 or older. The average household size was 2.37 and the average family size was 3.01.

In the town, the age distribution was 25.8% under 18, 7.1% from 18 to 24, 21.1% from 25 to 44, 21.5% from 45 to 64, and 24.4% who were 65 or older. The median age was 42 years. For every 100 females, there were 89.6 males. For every 100 females 18 and over, there were 87.2 males.

The median income for a household in the town was $25,583, and for a family was $30,000. Males had a median income of $24,688 versus $19,318 for females. The per capita income for the town was $14,732. About 13.8% of families and 20.2% of the population were below the poverty line, including 30.5% of those under 18 and 14.2% of those 65 or over.

== Education ==
The town is served by the Knox City-O'Brien Consolidated Independent School District.

== In popular culture ==
Knox City and Lyndon Baty were featured in a 2014 episode of Snap Judgment on artificial intelligence.
