= Glen Amerson =

American football player (1938–2020)

No. 46
- Position: Defensive back

Personal information
- Born: November 24, 1938; Munday, Texas, U.S.
- Died: October 15, 2020 (aged 81)
- Listed height: 6 ft 1 in (1.85 m)
- Listed weight: 186 lb (84 kg)

Career information
- High school: Munday (TX)
- College: Texas Tech
- NFL draft: 1961: undrafted

Career history
- Philadelphia Eagles (1961); Houston Oilers (1963)*
- * Offseason or practice squad member only

Career NFL statistics
- Games played: 14
- Stats at Pro Football Reference

Glen Douglas Amerson (November 24, 1938 – October 15, 2020) was an American professional football player who played defensive back in 1961 for the Philadelphia Eagles of the National Football League (NFL).

== Early life and college ==
Amerson attended Munday High School in Munday, Texas, where he played football, basketball, and ran track. He was named to the Texas all-state team in basketball and football. In football, Amerson played both offense and defense and was named to the Texas Oil Bowl in 1957 as a quarterback.

He was awarded a football scholarship at Texas Technological College With the Texas Tech Red Raiders, Amerson originally played fullback before transitioning to quarterback during the 1960 season.

== Professional career ==
Amerson injured his knee and missed five games in 1960, and was not selected in either the National Football League Draft or American Football League draft. He was signed by the Philadelphia Eagles in January 1961 on the recommendation of former Eagles' player Jim Parmer, who coached Amerson at Texas Tech. He appeared in 14 games with Philadelphia in 1961 and became a starter at defensive halfback after an injury to Tom Brookshier.

On April 28, 1962, Amerson was hospitalized after suffering face and head injuries in a car accident in Lubbock, Texas that required 500 stitches. During training camp, he was diagnosed with either encephalitis or a sleeping sickness and missed the 1962 season. Placed on waivers by the Eagles, he was signed by the Houston Oilers in 1963 but was released due to concerns over his medical records.

== Later life ==
After his football career, Amerson was employed in the construction business. He died on October 15, 2020, at the age of 81.
