= Vera, Texas =

- Unincorporated community
- Location within Texas Location within the United States
- Coordinates: 33°38′00″N 99°33′58″W
- Country: United States
- State: Texas
- County: Knox
- Elevation: 1,460 ft (450 m)
- Time zone: UTC-6 (Central (CST))
  - Summer (DST): UTC-5 (CDT)
- Area code: 940
- GNIS feature ID: 1370618

Vera is an unincorporated community in Knox County, Texas, United States. It lies on U.S. Highway 82 in the east-central portion of the county near the Baylor County line, and had an estimated population of 50 in 2000.

== History ==
Vera was originally known as White Flat; its name was changed to Vera in 1890 to avoid conflict with a post office elsewhere in Texas. G. W. Ballard, the first postmaster of the community, named the community Vera after Vera Kellogg, the daughter of an early settler of the community. Vera's economy became based on cotton production circa 1900, and the community gained a cotton gin in 1902. Vera had a school until 1960, when it merged with schools in Benjamin and Seymour. The community's population was 276 in 1990, but this figure declined to 50 by 2000.
