= Benjamin High School =

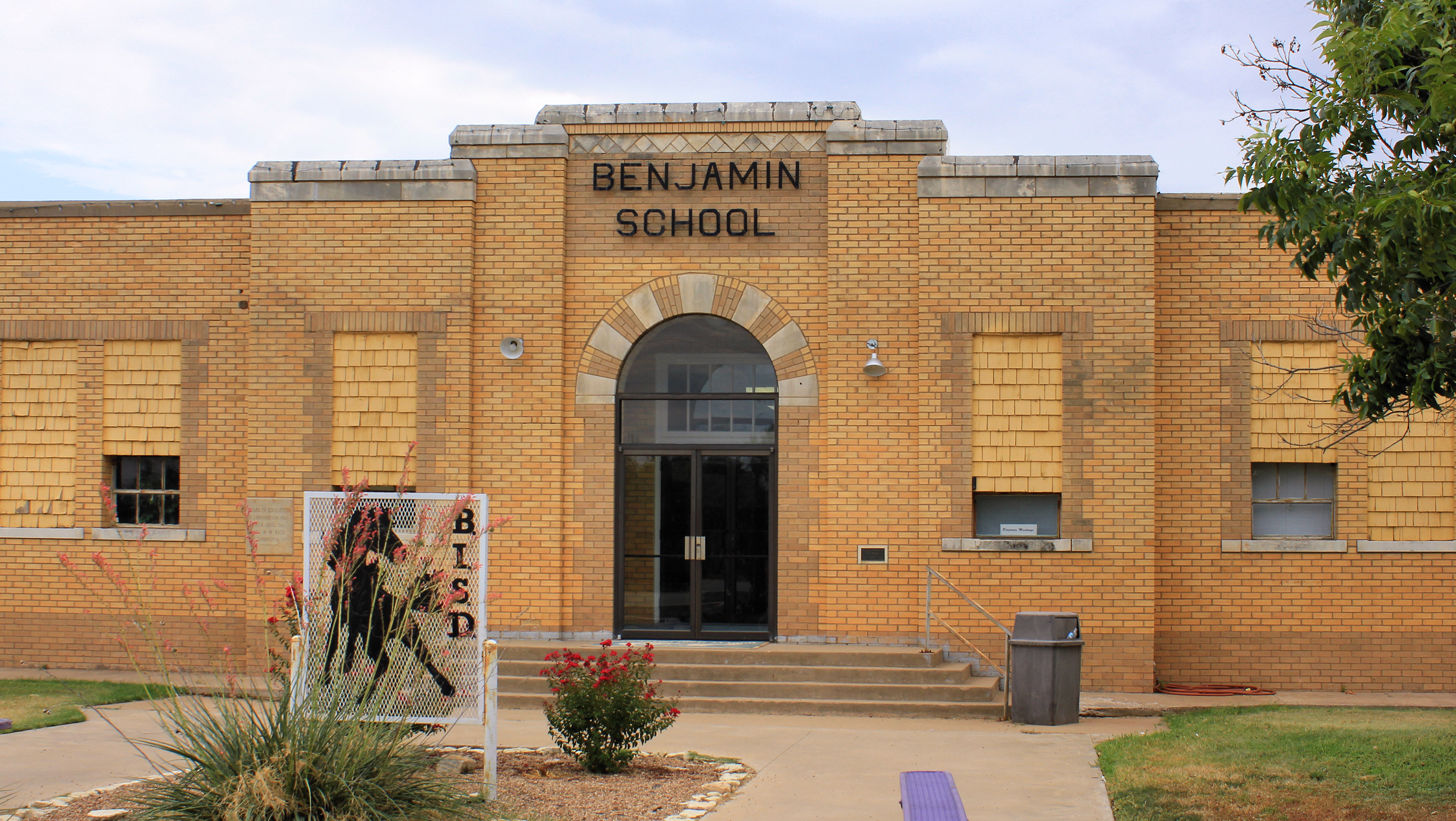

Location
- 300 Hays St; Benjamin, Texas 79505; United States; 33.58352°N 99.78933°W

Information
- School type: Public high school
- School district: Benjamin Independent School District
- Principal: Olivia Gloria
- Teaching staff: 16.98 (on an FTE basis)
- Grades: K–12
- Enrollment: 104 (2023–2024)
- Student to teacher ratio: 6.12
- Colors: Purple Black & White
- Athletics conference: UIL Class A
- Mascot: Mustang
- Website: Benjamin High School

Benjamin High School or Benjamin School is a public high school located in Benjamin, Texas (United States) and classified as a 1A school by the UIL. It is part of the Benjamin Independent School District located in north central Knox County. Benjamin School has all grades (K-12) in one building. In 2015, the school was rated "Met Standard" by the Texas Education Agency.

== Athletics ==
The Benjamin Mustangs compete in these sports -

Football (6-man), Volleyball, Cross Country, Basketball, Golf, Tennis & Track

=== State titles ===
- Football
  - 2022(1A/D2)
  - 2023(1A/D2)

== Faculty ==
- Don Haskins: He started his coaching career at Benjamin in 1955 as a teacher and basketball coach of both boys and girls teams from 1955–56. He was the men's basketball head coach at Texas Western College (renamed the University of Texas at El Paso in 1967) from 1961 to 1999, including the 1966 season when his team won the NCAA Tournament.

== See also ==
- List of high schools in Texas
