= L. J. Collier =

American football player (born 1995)

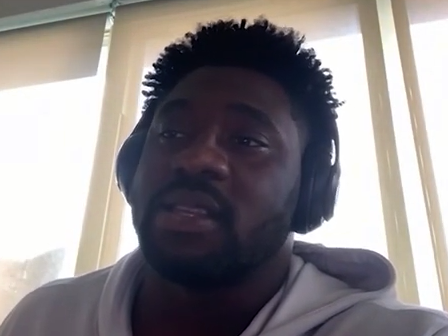
- Collier in 2020

No. 91 – Arizona Cardinals
- Position: Defensive tackle
- Roster status: Active

Personal information
- Born: September 12, 1995 (age 31); Munday, Texas, U.S.
- Listed height: 6 ft 2 in (1.88 m)
- Listed weight: 300 lb (136 kg)

Career information
- High school: Munday (TX)
- College: TCU (2014–2018)
- NFL draft: 2019: 1st round, 29th overall pick

Career history
- Seattle Seahawks (2019–2022); Arizona Cardinals (2023–present)

Awards and highlights
- First team All-Big 12 (2018)

Career NFL statistics as of Week 5, 2026
- Total tackles: 84
- Sacks: 6.5
- Fumble recoveries: 1
- Pass deflections: 7
- Stats at Pro Football Reference

Lawrence Edward "L. J." Collier Jr. (born September 12, 1995) is an American professional football defensive tackle for the Arizona Cardinals of the National Football League (NFL). He played college football for the TCU Horned Frogs, and was selected by the Seattle Seahawks in the first round of the 2019 NFL draft.

== Early life ==
Collier grew up in his father's hometown of Munday, Texas. He attended Munday High School, where he helped lead the Moguls to a state championship as a junior in 2012. He recorded six tackles, a sack, a forced fumble, and a touchdown on an interception return to earn Defensive MVP honors for the game.

On February 5, 2014, he signed a letter of intent to attend Texas Christian University in Fort Worth, Texas on a football scholarship.

== College career ==
Collier redshirted during his first season with Horned Frogs, but became a starter for TCU as a redshirt freshman in 2015 despite appearing in just one game. He played in all 13 games for the Horned Frogs as sophomore, recording 4.5 sacks and blocking a field goal against Georgia in the 2016 Liberty Bowl. He recorded 4.5 sacks again as a junior, including one in a crucial late-game situation in the Frogs' comeback win over Stanford in the 2017 Alamo Bowl.

As a senior in 2018, Collier finally got the opportunity to become a starter for the Horned Frogs. He responded by tallying 6.0 sacks, 11.5 tackles for loss and 4 pass break-ups to earn First-team All-Big 12 Conference honors and closed out his collegiate career with a sack in TCU's Cheez-It Bowl victory over California.

Following his senior season, Collier graduated from TCU and was invited to participate in the 2019 Senior Bowl, in which he recorded a sack and a forced fumble.

== Professional career ==
Pre-draft measurables
Height	Weight	Arm length	Hand span	Wingspan	40-yard dash	10-yard split	20-yard split	20-yard shuttle	Three-cone drill	Vertical jump	Broad jump	Bench press
6 ft 2 1/4 in (1.89 m)	283 lb (128 kg)	34 in (0.86 m)	10 in (0.25 m)	6 ft 9 7/8 in (2.08 m)	4.91 s	1.68 s	2.87 s	4.78 s	7.71 s	30 in (0.76 m)	9 ft 10 in (3.00 m)	25 reps
All values from NFL Combine

=== Seattle Seahawks ===
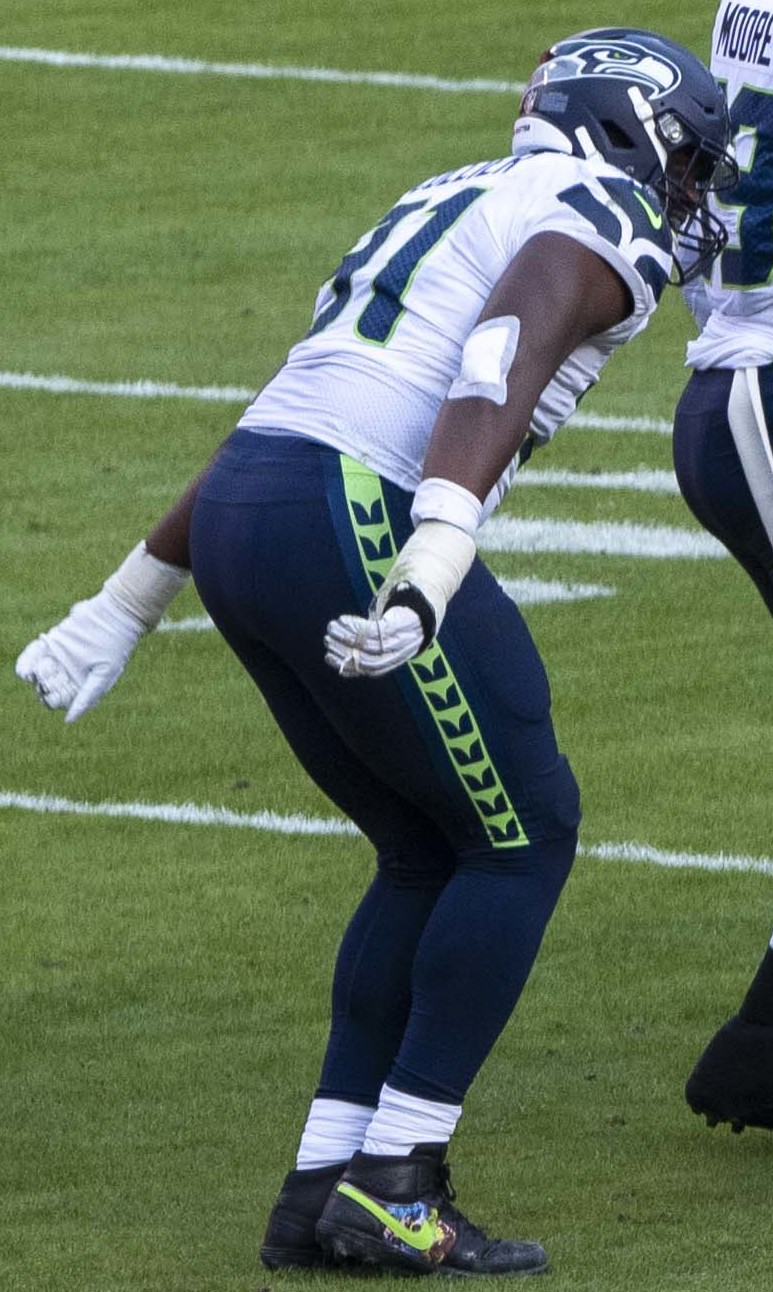
Collier with the Seattle Seahawks in 2020

Collier was selected by the Seattle Seahawks in the first round (29th overall) of the 2019 NFL draft. The Seahawks traded Frank Clark to the Kansas City Chiefs in order to obtain the selection used to select Collier. After suffering multiple injuries, he finished the season with 3 tackles.

Collier started the 2020 campaign as the starting defensive end for the Seattle Seahawks after the departure of Jadeveon Clowney. He had the biggest play of his early career when he stopped New England Patriots quarterback Cam Newton on the 1-yard line to secure a Week 2 35–30 victory on Sunday Night Football. In Week 5 against the Minnesota Vikings on Sunday Night Football, Collier recorded his first career sack on Kirk Cousins during the 27–26 win. In Week 11 against the Arizona Cardinals on Thursday Night Football, Collier recorded his second career sack, taking down Kyler Murray during a 28-21 win.

The Seahawks declined the fifth-year option on Collier's rookie contract making him a free agent after the 2022 season. Collier was placed on injured reserve to start the 2022 season. He was activated on October 26, 2022.

=== Arizona Cardinals ===
On March 21, 2023, Collier signed a one-year contract with the Arizona Cardinals. He was placed on injured reserve on September 16.

On March 8, 2024, Collier signed a one-year contract extension with the Cardinals. He played in all 17 games with 15 starts, recording 29 tackles and 3.5 sacks.

On March 12, 2025, Collier re-signed with the Cardinals on a one-year, $4 million contract. On September 17, Collier was placed on injured reserve due to a knee injury he suffered in the team's Week 2 victory over the Carolina Panthers. He was activated on December 24, ahead of the team's Week 17 matchup against the Cincinnati Bengals.

On March 9, 2026, Collier re-signed with the Cardinals on a one-year, $2.5 million contract.
