= The Narrows (Knox County, Texas) =

Landform in Texas, United States

Coordinates: 33°35′20″N 99°43′00″W

The Narrows is the name given to a geological feature located 4 to 6 miles (6.4 to 9.7 km) east of Benjamin in Knox County, Texas. It is a narrow crest running east-to-west along a hogback dividing the watershed of the Wichita River to the north from that of the Brazos River to the south. That is, precipitation falling to the north of the crest will flow into the Wichita River, and thence into the Red River and ultimately the Mississippi, while precipitation falling to the south will flow into the Brazos and then directly into the Gulf of Mexico. Before white settlers arrived in the area, buffalo were drawn to the spot due to the presence of buffalo grass and fresh springs, with the result that the area was known as prime hunting ground to several tribes of Indians, including the Comanche, Wichita, Kiowa, Apache, Seminole, and Tonkawa. Evidence of their battles and campgrounds is still being discovered. The new settlers used these same Indian-worn trails to traverse the area. Today the canyons and ravines of the area's badlands topography are used for ranching purposes.

US 82 runs directly along the crest, and the area, being picturesque, has become a popular tourist attraction; a roadside park and historical marker have been set up along the highway.
