= Pete Stout =

American football player (1923–1996)

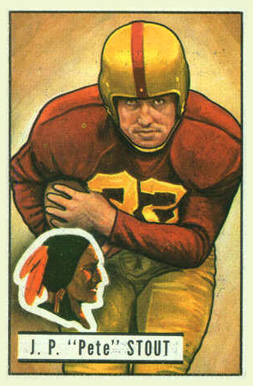
- Stout on a 1951 Bowman football card

No. 32
- Positions: Fullback, linebacker

Personal information
- Born: June 1, 1924; Throckmorton, Texas, U.S.
- Died: September 10, 1996 (aged 73); Edinburg, Texas, U.S.
- Listed height: 6 ft 0 in (1.83 m)
- Listed weight: 201 lb (91 kg)

Career information
- High school: Throckmorton
- College: North Texas Agricultural (1943); TCU (1946–1948)
- NFL draft: 1946: 5th round, 35th overall pick

Career history
- Washington Redskins (1949–1950)

Awards and highlights
- First-team All-SWC (1947)

Career NFL statistics
- Rushing yards: 298
- Rushing average: 4.2
- Receptions: 10
- Receiving yards: 117
- Total touchdowns: 6
- Stats at Pro Football Reference

J. Peter Stout (June 1, 1924 – September 10, 1996) was an American professional football player. He played as a fullback in the National Football League (NFL) for the Washington Redskins from 1949 to 1950. He was selected in the fifth round of the 1946 NFL draft by the New York Giants. Born in Throckmorton, Texas, Stout played college football at Texas Christian University (TCU). He was a first-team selection by the Associated Press on the 1947 All-Southwest Conference football team. Stout was elected captain of the 1948 TCU Horned Frogs football team. He also played with the 1943 North Texas Aggies football team while he was a United States Marine Corps trainee at North Texas Agricultural College (NATC)—now known as the University of Texas at Arlington.

Stout was born on June 1, 1924, on a ranch in Throckmorton, Texas. He served in the Marines during World War II and saw action in the Battle of Okinawa. He died on September 11, 1996, in Edinburg, Texas.
