= Throckmorton High School =

Location
- 210 College Street; Throckmorton, Texas 76483-5011; United States; 33.183033°N 99.179978°W

Information
- School type: Public high school
- School district: Throckmorton Collegiate I.S.D.
- Principal: David Farquhar
- Teaching staff: 18.87 (FTE)
- Grades: PK–12
- Enrollment: 131 (2023–2024)
- Student to teacher ratio: 6.94
- Colors: Purple & gold
- Athletics conference: UIL Class A
- Mascot: Greyhound
- Elevation: 1,360 ft (415 m) AMSL
- Website: Throckmorton HS

Location in Texas

Throckmorton High School is a public high school located in Throckmorton, Texas, United States. It is classified as a 1A school by the University Interscholastic League (UIL). It is part of the Throckmorton Collegiate Independent School District (formerly the Throckmorton Independent School District) located in central Throckmorton County. In 2015, the school was rated "Met Standard" by the Texas Education Agency.

== Athletics ==
The Throckmorton Greyhounds compete in these sports:

- Basketball
- Cross country
- 6-man football
- Golf
- Tennis
- Track and field

=== State titles ===
- Football
  - 2005 (6M), 2011 (6M/D1), 2012 (6M/D1), 2014 (6M/D2)
- Boys' golf
  - 1977 (B), 1978 (B), 1979 (B), 1980 (B), 1985 (1A), 2002 (1A), 2006 (1A), 2015 (1A)
- Girls' golf
  - 2003 (1A)
- One Act Play
  - 1982 (1A)

==== State finalists ====
- Football
  - 1986 (1A), 2010 (6M/D1)

== Band ==
- Marching Band State Champions^
  - 2003 (1A)

^ co-champions with Sundown High School

== Notable people ==
- Bob Lilly, Pro Football Hall of Fame defensive tackle for the Dallas Cowboys (1961–74); attended THS through junior year; played college football at TCU in Fort Worth
- Pete Stout, former NFL fullback/linebacker
