= Goree Independent School District =

Defunct school district in Texas, United States

Goree Independent School District was a public school district based in Goree, Texas (USA).

The district consisted of a single campus - Goree School - that served students in grades pre-kindergarten through twelve. It was located in southeastern Knox County and extended into northeastern Haskell and northwestern Throckmorton counties.

Goree School was the 1972 and 1973 Texas eight-man football state champions. The eight-man title was contested for only four years (1972 through 1975); thus, Goree won 50 percent of the titles.

== District enrollment (1989-2003) ==
- 1989–90 - 109 students
- 1990–91 - 103 students
- 1991–92 - 97 students
- 1992–93 - 90 students
- 1993–94 - 83 students
- 1994–95 - 93 students
- 1995–96 - 80 students
- 1996–97 - 92 students
- 1997–98 - 82 students
- 1998–99 - 69 students
- 1999–00 - 63 students
- 2000–01 - 56 students
- 2001–02 - 57 students
- 2002–03 - 47 students

The ethnic composition of students in the 2002-2003 school year was 34 Hispanic (72%), 9 White (19%), and 4 African American (9%). Of the 47 students, 45 (95.7%) were considered economically disadvantaged.

== Student performance ==
Goree ISD's performance on the Texas Assessment of Academic Skills (TAAS), a state standardized test used from 1991 to 2003, generally met state standards. The district was rated "academically acceptable" from 1994 to 2002. In its final year, 2002-2003, Goree received an "academically unacceptable" rating due to a low passing rate on the Social Studies portion of the test.

== Consolidation ==
The district, faced with a rapidly declining enrollment, held a vote on November 5, 2002 on whether or not to merge with the larger Munday Independent School District. In order for the proposal to pass, voters in both Goree and Munday had to approve the plan.

In Goree, 84 voted for consolidation (83.2%) while 17 voted against it (16.8%). Munday voters approved the plan by a margin of 446–30 (93.7%–6.3%).

On July 1, 2003, the merger took effect, creating the Munday Consolidated Independent School District. When classes resumed in August, the Goree campus became Munday Junior High School, serving the district's seventh and eighth graders.
