= William Edward Throckmorton =

Collin County, Texas settler (1795–1843)

Dr. William Edward Throckmorton (1795 – October 2, 1843) was an early Collin County, Texas settler.

Born in Virginia in 1795, Throckmorton was the son of a Revolutionary War soldier. He grew up in Virginia and met his first wife, Elizabeth Webb, there.

After receiving a degree in Medicine in 1817, Throckmorton began what was to become a series of moves across the country. In 1821, he moved to Sparta, Tennessee where he practiced medicine. This was followed by a move to Illinois. In the mid-1830s, he moved his practice to Fayetteville, Arkansas. While living there, his wife, Susan Jane [Rotan] died.

He married his second wife, Malinda Clement, in 1840. (Malinda is sometimes referred to as Malinda Wilson as she married John H. Wilson after William Throckmorton died.) They moved to Texas a year later, settling near the town of Melissa in Collin County. He died on October 2, 1843, and was buried in the Throckmorton Cemetery outside Melissa.

By his first wife, Throckmorton fathered eight children: William Albion (1819-1857); Mary Lee (1821-1822); John Augustus (1823-1895); James Webb (1825-1894); Robert Middleton (1828-1863); Lucy Jane (1831-1832); Dorothea Ann (1834-1834); Nancy Hampton (1836-1878). James Webb, became a prominent Texas politician. He held a number of positions, including State Senator, Governor, and United States Congressman.

Throckmorton County, Texas, established on January 13, 1858, was named in honor of Dr. William Edward Throckmorton.
