= Truscott, Texas =

- Unincorporated community
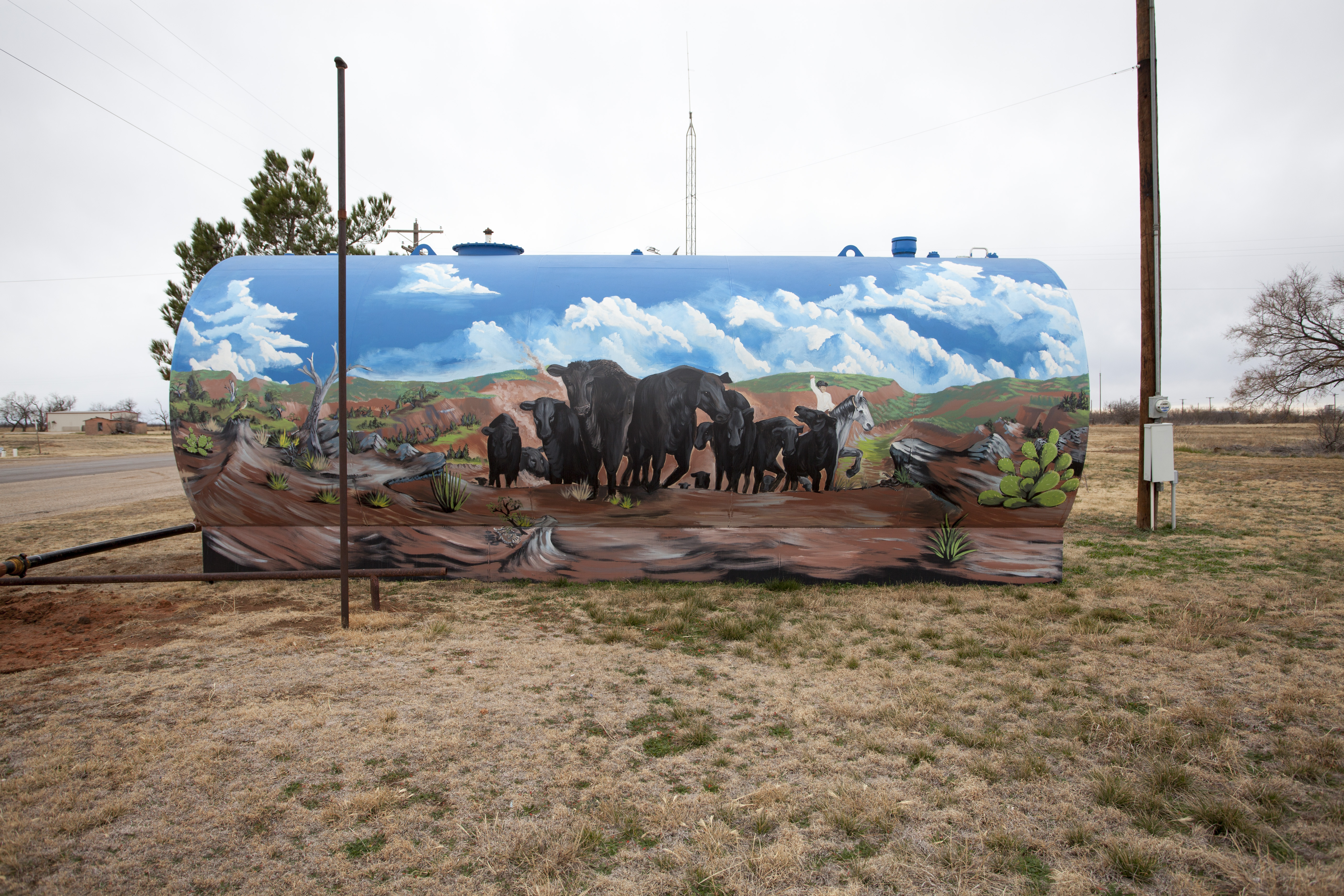
- Painted gas tank near the former First Bank of Truscott

- Location within Texas Location within the United States
- Coordinates: 33.7542544°N 99.8112042°W
- Country: United States
- State: Texas
- County: Knox
- Region: Rolling Plains
- Established: 1880s
- Founder: J.J. Truscott
- Elevation: 1,526 ft (465 m)
- Time zone: UTC-6 (CST)
- Area code: 806
- Website: Handbook of Texas

Truscott is an unincorporated community in Knox County, Texas, United States. According to the Handbook of Texas, the community had an estimated population of 50.

It is located at 33°45′15″N 99°48′40″W (33.7542544, -99.8112042), along FM 1756 in north central Knox County, approximately 100 miles north of Abilene.

The community was settled in the 1880s and was named after J.J. Truscott, a local pioneer. The population peaked at around 500 in 1940 and declined thereafter.

Public education in the community of Truscott is provided by the Crowell Independent School District.

== Climate ==
According to the Köppen Climate Classification system, Truscott has a humid subtropical climate, abbreviated "Cfa" on climate maps. The hottest temperature recorded in Truscott was 118 °F (47.8 °C) on June 28, 1994 and June 20, 2011, while the coldest temperature recorded was −10 °F (−23.3 °C) on December 22–23, 1989.

Climate data for Truscott, Texas, 1991–2020 normals, extremes 1963–present
Month	Jan	Feb	Mar	Apr	May	Jun	Jul	Aug	Sep	Oct	Nov	Dec	Year
Record high °F (°C)	89 (32)	96 (36)	102 (39)	107 (42)	113 (45)	118 (48)	114 (46)	114 (46)	112 (44)	106 (41)	93 (34)	87 (31)	118 (48)
Mean maximum °F (°C)	77.5 (25.3)	82.3 (27.9)	88.7 (31.5)	94.8 (34.9)	99.9 (37.7)	103.6 (39.8)	106.6 (41.4)	105.4 (40.8)	100.5 (38.1)	94.6 (34.8)	83.9 (28.8)	77.8 (25.4)	108.6 (42.6)
Mean daily maximum °F (°C)	55.2 (12.9)	59.5 (15.3)	67.7 (19.8)	77.2 (25.1)	85.2 (29.6)	92.9 (33.8)	97.2 (36.2)	96.9 (36.1)	88.0 (31.1)	78.1 (25.6)	65.9 (18.8)	56.4 (13.6)	76.7 (24.8)
Daily mean °F (°C)	42.4 (5.8)	46.0 (7.8)	53.9 (12.2)	62.8 (17.1)	72.1 (22.3)	80.7 (27.1)	84.7 (29.3)	83.9 (28.8)	75.7 (24.3)	64.6 (18.1)	52.9 (11.6)	43.7 (6.5)	63.6 (17.6)
Mean daily minimum °F (°C)	29.5 (−1.4)	32.6 (0.3)	40.1 (4.5)	48.4 (9.1)	59.1 (15.1)	68.5 (20.3)	72.2 (22.3)	71.0 (21.7)	63.4 (17.4)	51.1 (10.6)	40.0 (4.4)	31.0 (−0.6)	50.6 (10.3)
Mean minimum °F (°C)	17.2 (−8.2)	19.4 (−7.0)	24.8 (−4.0)	34.5 (1.4)	44.5 (6.9)	58.1 (14.5)	64.2 (17.9)	62.5 (16.9)	50.2 (10.1)	35.1 (1.7)	24.4 (−4.2)	19.3 (−7.1)	13.3 (−10.4)
Record low °F (°C)	−2 (−19)	−6 (−21)	6 (−14)	21 (−6)	36 (2)	37 (3)	54 (12)	51 (11)	38 (3)	19 (−7)	14 (−10)	−10 (−23)	−10 (−23)
Average precipitation inches (mm)	1.09 (28)	1.45 (37)	1.71 (43)	2.18 (55)	3.48 (88)	3.43 (87)	2.07 (53)	2.05 (52)	2.89 (73)	2.41 (61)	1.54 (39)	1.13 (29)	25.43 (645)
Average snowfall inches (cm)	0.9 (2.3)	0.0 (0.0)	0.0 (0.0)	0.0 (0.0)	0.0 (0.0)	0.0 (0.0)	0.0 (0.0)	0.0 (0.0)	0.0 (0.0)	0.0 (0.0)	0.3 (0.76)	0.0 (0.0)	1.2 (3.06)
Average precipitation days (≥ 0.01 in)	3.6	3.8	5.1	4.8	6.9	6.0	4.9	4.6	5.7	5.0	3.5	3.4	57.3
Average snowy days (≥ 0.1 in)	0.4	0.1	0.0	0.0	0.0	0.0	0.0	0.0	0.0	0.0	0.1	0.1	0.7
Source 1: NOAA
Source 2: National Weather Service
