= Knox City-O'Brien Consolidated Independent School District =

School district in Texas

Coordinates: 33.4181°N 99.8126°W

Knox City-O'Brien Consolidated Independent School District is a public school district based in Knox City, Texas, United States. In addition to Knox City, the district also serves the city of O'Brien. Located in southwestern Knox County, a portion of the district lies in northwestern Haskell County.

In 2009, the school district was rated "academically acceptable" by the Texas Education Agency.

== Schools ==
- Knox City High School (grades 9–12)
  - 1983 Class A state football champions
- O'Brien Middle (grades 5–8)
  - previously O'Brien High School, which was the 1972 Texas state champion in six-man football, the first title ever awarded in this classification
- Knox City Elementary (prekindergarten-grade 4)

== Special programs ==
=== Athletics ===
Knox City High School plays six-man football.

== See also ==
- List of school districts in Texas
