= Throckmorton County, Texas =

County in Texas, United States

- County
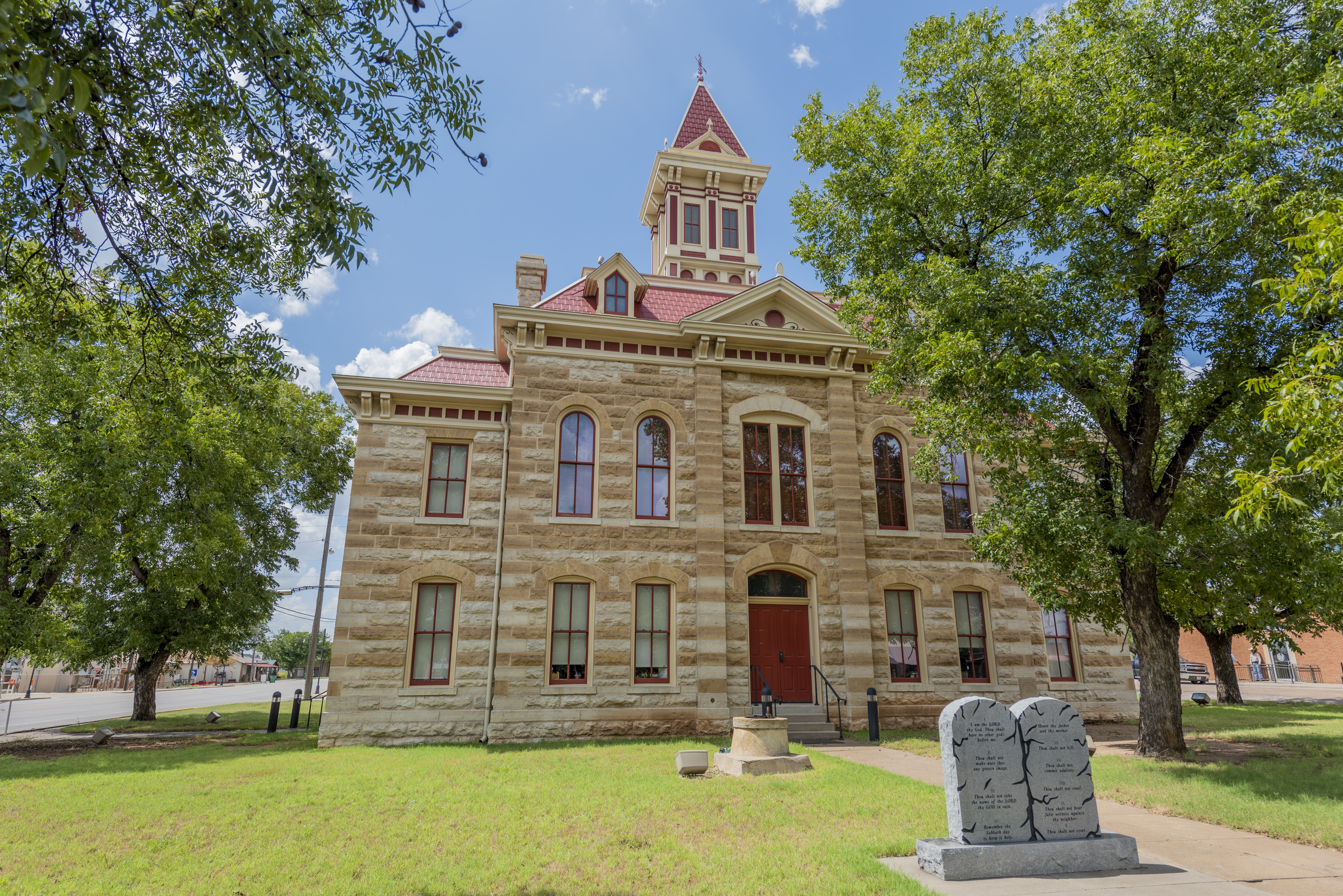
- The Throckmorton County Courthouse

- Location within the U.S. state of Texas
- Coordinates: 33°11′N 99°13′W
- Country: United States
- State: Texas
- Founded: 1879
- Named for: William Throckmorton
- Seat: Throckmorton
- Largest town: Throckmorton

Area
  - Total: 915 sq mi (2,370 km^{2})
  - Land: 913 sq mi (2,360 km^{2})
  - Water: 2.9 sq mi (7.5 km^{2}) 0.3%

Population (2020)
  - Total: 1,440
  - Estimate (2025): 1,554 ▲
  - Density: 1.58/sq mi (0.609/km^{2})
- Time zone: UTC−6 (Central)
  - Summer (DST): UTC−5 (CDT)
- Congressional district: 19th
- Website: www.throckmortoncounty.org

Throckmorton County is a county located in the U.S. state of Texas. As of the 2020 census, its population was 1,440. Its county seat is Throckmorton. The county was created in 1858 and later organized in 1879. It is named for William Throckmorton, an early Collin County settler. Throckmorton County is one of four remaining prohibition, or entirely dry, counties in Texas.

== History ==
Spanish explorer Pedro Vial is considered to be the earliest European to travel through what is now known as Throckmorton County. Vial passed between the Clear Fork and Main Fork of the Brazos River in 1786 while searching for a direct route between San Antonio and Santa Fe. No other major activity is recorded in the county until 1849, when Captain Randolph B. Marcy, commander of a U.S. military escort expedition led by Lieutenant J. E. Johnson, passed through the county.

In 1837, the Republic of Texas established Fannin County, which included the area now known as Throckmorton County. In 1858, Throckmorton County was officially established. Williamsburg was designated as county seat. The county was named in honor of Dr. William E. Throckmorton, an early North Texas pioneer and the father of James W. Throckmorton, who later became governor of Texas. Organization of the county was delayed until 1879, when Throckmorton was named the county seat.

In 1854, Captain Marcy returned to the county in search of suitable locations for a reservation for Texas Indians. He surveyed and established the tract of land that became known as the Comanche Indian Reservation, which is adjacent to the Clear Fork of the Brazos River in the county. The reservation consisted of about 18,576 acres (7,517 ha) of land extending well out from both sides of the river. The location was ideal because it provided plenty of running water and hunting opportunities. Marcy also met with Sanaco and the Tecumseh leaders of the southern band of Comanche Indians in an attempt to persuade them to move to the reservation, which they began doing in 1855. In January 1856, Colonel Albert Sidney Johnston established Camp Cooper (named after Samuel Cooper) on the banks of the Clear Fork to protect the reservation. Captain Robert E. Lee served as commander of the camp from April 9, 1856, to July 22, 1857. In 1859, persons living on the Comanche Indian Reservation were uprooted and moved to the Oklahoma Indian Territory. In 1861, a few months before the start of the Civil War, Camp Cooper was abandoned by federal troops in the face of building political tension between north and south.

From 1847 until the start of the Civil War, several settlers moved into the county, living mostly in the vicinity of Camp Cooper. When the camp was abandoned, most of the settlers moved east into a line of forts that offered protection from the northern Comanche Indians.

In 1858, the Butterfield Overland Mail stage line began operating with two relay stations in Throckmorton County. One was called Franz's Station, and the other was Clear Fork of the Brazos station on the east bank of the Clear Fork of the Brazos River, a short distance above its confluence with Lambshead Creek, in southwestern Throckmorton County.

Following the Civil War, Fort Griffin was established in 1867 along the Clear Fork of the Brazos River directly south of the Throckmorton - Shackleford County line. With federal troops in the area, most of the old settlers returned to the county and many new ones arrived. The first settlements were in areas along the Clear Fork, where the natural environment was best and wildlife was abundant. Vast herds of buffalo roamed in the areas, with buffalo hunters being headquartered at Fort Griffin. The first settlers were cattlemen who used the open range at will and moved cattle northward along the Great Western Cattle Trail. Later, farmers moved into the survey area and homesteaded on small tracts of land.

Federal troops abandoned Fort Griffin in 1881. This signaled the end of the region's frontier era.

Glenn Reynolds was the first sheriff of Throckmorton County, Texas. Later, he moved to Arizona and was elected sheriff of Globe, Gila County, Arizona. On November 2, 1889, while transporting Apache Indian prisoners to Yuma State Prison, he and Deputy Sheriff Williams Holmes, were overpowered outside of Kelvin, Arizona and killed by them. One of these prisoners was the infamous Apache Kid.

== Geography ==
According to the U.S. Census Bureau, the county has a total area of 915 sq mi (2,370 km^{2}), of which 913 sq mi (2,360 km^{2}) are land and 2.9 sq mi (7.5 km^{2}) (0.3%) are covered by water.

=== Major highways ===
- U.S. Highway 183
- U.S. Highway 283
- U.S. Highway 380
- State Highway 79
- State Highway 222

=== Adjacent counties ===
- Baylor County (north)
- Young County (east)
- Stephens County (southeast)
- Shackelford County (south)
- Haskell County (west)
- Archer County (northeast)
- Knox County (northwest)

== Demographics ==
Historical population
| Census | Pop. | Note | %± |
|---|---|---|---|
| 1860 | 124 | | — |
| 1880 | 711 | | — |
| 1890 | 902 | | 26.9% |
| 1900 | 1,750 | | 94.0% |
| 1910 | 4,563 | | 160.7% |
| 1920 | 3,589 | | −21.3% |
| 1930 | 5,253 | | 46.4% |
| 1940 | 4,275 | | −18.6% |
| 1950 | 3,618 | | −15.4% |
| 1960 | 2,767 | | −23.5% |
| 1970 | 2,205 | | −20.3% |
| 1980 | 2,053 | | −6.9% |
| 1990 | 1,880 | | −8.4% |
| 2000 | 1,850 | | −1.6% |
| 2010 | 1,641 | | −11.3% |
| 2020 | 1,440 | | −12.2% |
| 2025 (est.) | 1,554 | ▲ | 7.9% |
U.S. Decennial Census; 1850–2010 2010 2020

=== Racial and ethnic composition ===
Throckmorton County, Texas – Racial and ethnic composition Note: the US Census treats Hispanic/Latino as an ethnic category. This table excludes Latinos from the racial categories and assigns them to a separate category. Hispanics/Latinos may be of any race.
| Race / Ethnicity (NH = Non-Hispanic) | Pop 1980 | Pop 1990 | Pop 2000 | Pop 2010 | Pop 2020 | % 1980 | % 1990 | % 2000 | % 2010 | % 2020 |
|---|---|---|---|---|---|---|---|---|---|---|
| White alone (NH) | 1,919 | 1,732 | 1,655 | 1,453 | 1,248 | 93.47% | 92.13% | 89.46% | 88.54% | 86.67% |
| Black or African American alone (NH) | 0 | 0 | 1 | 9 | 1 | 0.00% | 0.00% | 0.05% | 0.55% | 0.07% |
| Native American or Alaska Native alone (NH) | 7 | 4 | 7 | 11 | 3 | 0.34% | 0.21% | 0.38% | 0.67% | 0.21% |
| Asian alone (NH) | 5 | 8 | 1 | 7 | 3 | 0.24% | 0.43% | 0.05% | 0.43% | 0.21% |
| Native Hawaiian or Pacific Islander alone (NH) | x | x | 0 | 0 | 0 | x | x | 0.00% | 0.00% | 0.00% |
| Other race alone (NH) | 7 | 0 | 1 | 0 | 0 | 0.34% | 0.00% | 0.05% | 0.00% | 0.00% |
| Mixed race or Multiracial (NH) | x | x | 12 | 9 | 40 | x | x | 0.65% | 0.55% | 2.78% |
| Hispanic or Latino (any race) | 115 | 136 | 173 | 152 | 145 | 5.60% | 7.23% | 9.35% | 9.26% | 10.07% |
| Total | 2,053 | 1,880 | 1,850 | 1,641 | 1,440 | 100.00% | 100.00% | 100.00% | 100.00% | 100.00% |

=== 2020 census ===
As of the 2020 census, the county had a population of 1,440.

The median age was 48.6 years, 21.7% of residents were under the age of 18, and 28.1% of residents were 65 years of age or older; for every 100 females there were 90.5 males, and for every 100 females age 18 and over there were 89.3 males age 18 and over.

The racial makeup of the county was 89.9% White, 0.1% Black or African American, 0.3% American Indian and Alaska Native, 0.2% Asian, less than 0.1% Native Hawaiian and Pacific Islander, 2.2% from some other race, and 7.2% from two or more races. Hispanic or Latino residents of any race comprised 10.1% of the population.

Less than 0.1% of residents lived in urban areas, while 100.0% lived in rural areas.

There were 647 households in the county, of which 30.1% had children under the age of 18 living in them. Of all households, 49.5% were married-couple households, 19.8% were households with a male householder and no spouse or partner present, and 24.7% were households with a female householder and no spouse or partner present. About 26.9% of all households were made up of individuals and 14.9% had someone living alone who was 65 years of age or older.

There were 964 housing units, of which 32.9% were vacant. Among occupied housing units, 73.0% were owner-occupied and 27.0% were renter-occupied. The homeowner vacancy rate was 4.3% and the rental vacancy rate was 7.9%.

=== 2010 census ===
As of the census of 2010, 1,641 people lived in the county. It had 1,079 housing units, 358 of which were vacant. The racial makeup of the county was 94.8% White, 0.1% African American, 0.7% Native American, 0.4% Asian, 2.6% from other races, and 0.8% from two or more races. About 9.3% of the population were Hispanics or Latinos of any race.

=== 2000 census ===
As of the census of 2000, 1,850 people, 765 households, and 534 families were residing in the county. The population density was 2 people per square mile (0.77 people/km^{2}). The 1,066 housing units averaged 1 per square mile (0.39/km^{2}). The racial makeup of the county was 92.11% White, 0.05% African American, 0.43% Native American, 0.05% Asian, 5.57% from other races, and 1.78% from two or more races. About 9.35% of the population were Hispanics or Latinos of any race.

Of the 765 households, 29.2% had children under 18 living with them, 58.8% were married couples living together, 8.2% had a female householder with no husband present, and 30.1% were not families. About 28.0% of all households were made up of individuals, and 16.6% had someone living alone who was 65 or older. The average household size was 2.39, and the average family size was 2.92.

In the county, age distribution was 25.2% under 18, 5.7% from 18 to 24, 22.9% from 25 to 44, 25.7% from 45 to 64, and 20.5% who were 65 or older. The median age was 42 years. For every 100 females, there were 97.20 males. For every 100 women age 18 and over, there were 93 men.

The median income for a household in the county was $28,277, and for a family was $34,563. Men had a median income of $22,837 versus $19,485 for women. The per capita income for the county was $17,719. About 11.40% of families and 13.50% of the population were below the poverty line, including 19.60% of those under age 18 and 7.50% of those age 65 or over.

=== Census-designated place ===
- Elbert

== Politics ==
Republican Drew Springer, Jr., a businessman from Muenster in Cooke County, has represented Throckmorton County in the Texas House of Representatives since 2013. Springer defeated Throckmorton County rancher Trent McKnight in the Republican runoff election held on July 31, 2012. McKnight won 49% of the vote on May 29, 2012, and missed securing the House seat by 188 votes.

Throckmorton County is located within District 68 of the Texas House of Representatives. Throckmorton County is located within District 28 of the Texas Senate.

United States presidential election results for Throckmorton County, Texas
| Year | Republican | | Democratic | | Third party(ies) | |
| Year | No. | % | No. | % | No. | % |
|---|---|---|---|---|---|---|
| 1912 | 4 | 1.48% | 252 | 92.99% | 15 | 5.54% |
| 1916 | 10 | 2.38% | 333 | 79.29% | 77 | 18.33% |
| 1920 | 72 | 14.46% | 399 | 80.12% | 27 | 5.42% |
| 1924 | 174 | 24.20% | 539 | 74.97% | 6 | 0.83% |
| 1928 | 703 | 69.81% | 304 | 30.19% | 0 | 0.00% |
| 1932 | 95 | 9.23% | 932 | 90.57% | 2 | 0.19% |
| 1936 | 132 | 12.19% | 949 | 87.63% | 2 | 0.18% |
| 1940 | 138 | 12.18% | 995 | 87.82% | 0 | 0.00% |
| 1944 | 76 | 6.42% | 970 | 81.93% | 138 | 11.66% |
| 1948 | 63 | 5.63% | 1,026 | 91.61% | 31 | 2.77% |
| 1952 | 586 | 44.60% | 728 | 55.40% | 0 | 0.00% |
| 1956 | 466 | 41.35% | 656 | 58.21% | 5 | 0.44% |
| 1960 | 442 | 38.98% | 689 | 60.76% | 3 | 0.26% |
| 1964 | 247 | 21.86% | 883 | 78.14% | 0 | 0.00% |
| 1968 | 317 | 29.88% | 618 | 58.25% | 126 | 11.88% |
| 1972 | 568 | 61.81% | 348 | 37.87% | 3 | 0.33% |
| 1976 | 356 | 35.04% | 658 | 64.76% | 2 | 0.20% |
| 1980 | 444 | 48.90% | 455 | 50.11% | 9 | 0.99% |
| 1984 | 586 | 59.86% | 388 | 39.63% | 5 | 0.51% |
| 1988 | 455 | 45.59% | 534 | 53.51% | 9 | 0.90% |
| 1992 | 389 | 38.21% | 401 | 39.39% | 228 | 22.40% |
| 1996 | 360 | 48.85% | 285 | 38.67% | 92 | 12.48% |
| 2000 | 608 | 72.21% | 228 | 27.08% | 6 | 0.71% |
| 2004 | 656 | 76.01% | 202 | 23.41% | 5 | 0.58% |
| 2008 | 671 | 80.07% | 166 | 19.81% | 1 | 0.12% |
| 2012 | 700 | 86.10% | 109 | 13.41% | 4 | 0.49% |
| 2016 | 715 | 88.49% | 84 | 10.40% | 9 | 1.11% |
| 2020 | 806 | 90.16% | 82 | 9.17% | 6 | 0.67% |
| 2024 | 823 | 91.44% | 73 | 8.11% | 4 | 0.44% |

United States Senate election results for Throckmorton County, Texas1
| Year | Republican | | Democratic | | Third party(ies) | |
| Year | No. | % | No. | % | No. | % |
|---|---|---|---|---|---|---|
| 2024 | 801 | 90.00% | 80 | 8.99% | 9 | 1.01% |

United States Senate election results for Throckmorton County, Texas2
| Year | Republican | | Democratic | | Third party(ies) | |
| Year | No. | % | No. | % | No. | % |
|---|---|---|---|---|---|---|
| 2020 | 788 | 90.16% | 76 | 8.70% | 10 | 1.14% |

Texas Gubernatorial election results for Throckmorton County
| Year | Republican | | Democratic | | Third party(ies) | |
| Year | No. | % | No. | % | No. | % |
|---|---|---|---|---|---|---|
| 2022 | 612 | 91.75% | 51 | 7.65% | 4 | 0.60% |

== Communities ==
=== Towns, Villages and Hamlets ===
- Throckmorton (county seat)
- Elbert
- Woodson

== Education ==
School districts serving sections of the county include:

- Munday Consolidated Independent School District
- Olney Independent School District
- Throckmorton Collegiate Independent School District
- Woodson Independent School District

Goree Independent School District formerly served sections of the county. On July 1, 2003, it merged into Munday CISD.

Formerly Megargel Independent School District served a portion of the county. In 2006 Megargel schools closed.

The county is in the service area of Vernon College.

== See also ==
- Dry counties
- National Register of Historic Places listings in Throckmorton County, Texas
- Recorded Texas Historic Landmarks in Throckmorton County
