= Bob Lilly =

American football player (born 1939)

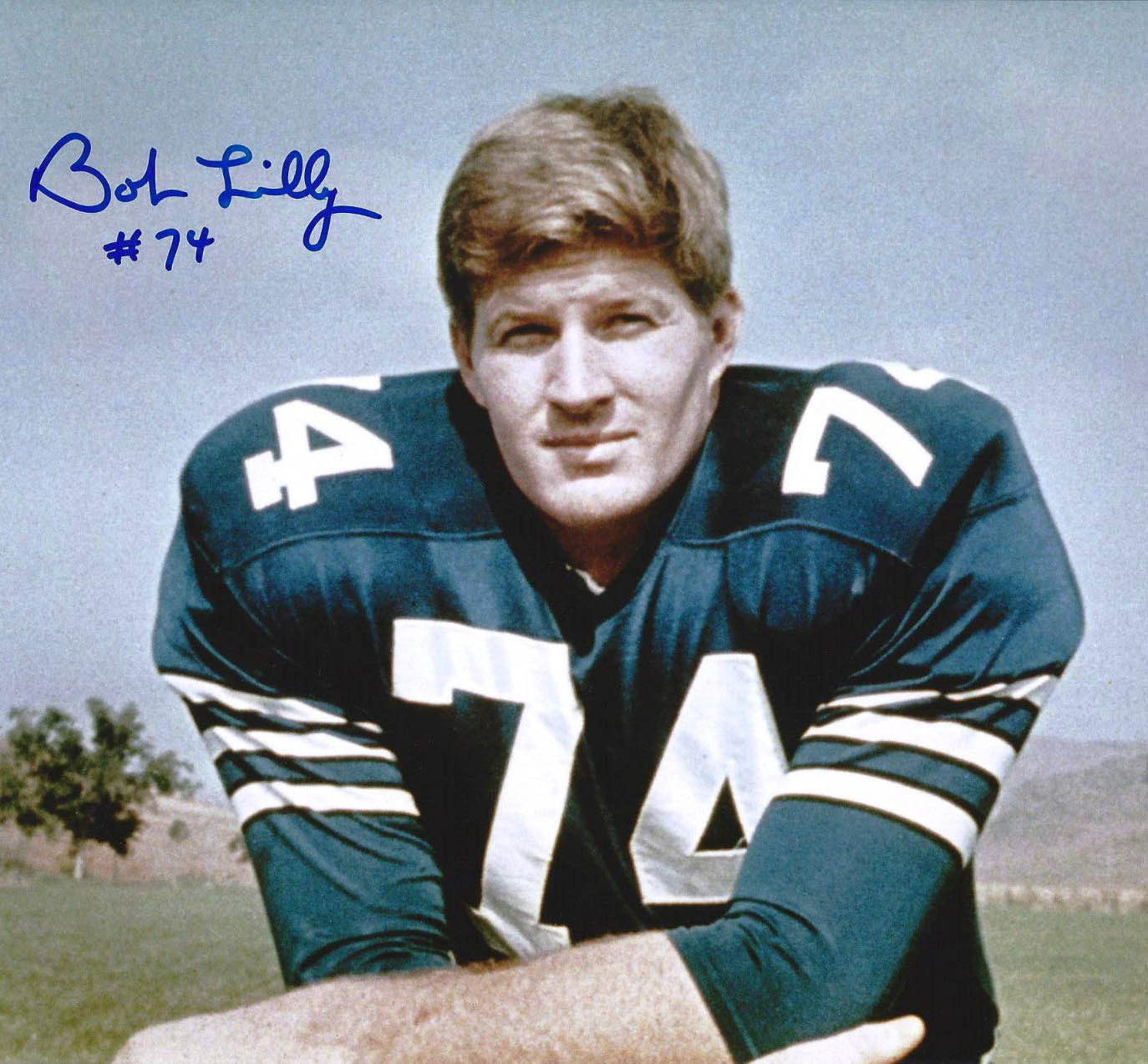
- Lilly c. 1967

No. 74
- Position: Defensive tackle

Personal information
- Born: July 26, 1939 (age 87); Olney, Texas, U.S.
- Listed height: 6 ft 5 in (1.96 m)
- Listed weight: 260 lb (118 kg)

Career information
- High school: Throckmorton (Throckmorton, Texas); Pendleton (Pendleton, Oregon)
- College: TCU (1958–1960)
- NFL draft: 1961: 1st round, 13th overall pick
- AFL draft: 1961: 2nd round, 14th overall pick

Career history
- Dallas Cowboys (1961–1974)

Awards and highlights
- Super Bowl champion (VI); 7× First-team All-Pro (1964–1969, 1971); 2× Second-team All-Pro (1970, 1972); 11× Pro Bowl (1962, 1964–1973); NFL 1960s All-Decade Team; NFL 1970s All-Decade Team; NFL 75th Anniversary All-Time Team; NFL 100th Anniversary All-Time Team; Dallas Cowboys Ring of Honor; Unanimous All-American (1960); 2× First-team All-SWC (1959, 1960)

Career NFL statistics
- Fumble recoveries: 18
- Interceptions: 1
- Defensive touchdowns: 4
- Stats at Pro Football Reference
- Pro Football Hall of Fame
- College Football Hall of Fame

Robert Lewis Lilly (born July 26, 1939), nicknamed "Mr. Cowboy", is an American former professional football defensive tackle who played in the National Football League (NFL) for 14 seasons with the Dallas Cowboys. He played college football for the TCU Horned Frogs. Lilly was inducted into the Pro Football Hall of Fame in 1980 and the College Football Hall of Fame in 1981.

== Early life ==
Born in Olney, Texas, Lilly grew up in Throckmorton, the son of John and Margaret (Redwine) Lilly. Lilly's father and grandfather were both involved in farming and ranching, but the severe 1950s Texas drought forced his family to move at the end of his junior year at Throckmorton High School, where he received All-District honors in football. In basketball, he was named All-District and honorable-mention All-state.

In 1956, Lilly and his family moved to Pendleton in northeastern Oregon—where his mother had family and jobs were available—for his senior year. At Pendleton High School, he was named All-state in football and second-team All-state in basketball for the Buckaroos.

== College career ==
Lilly accepted an athletic scholarship from Texas Christian University, where he was nicknamed "Tiger [Lilly]" by his teammates. As a sophomore with the Horned Frogs, he was a part of the team that won the Southwest Conference (SWC) championship, where he was mainly a backup (one start).

He became a starter the next year, playing alongside All-SWC defensive tackle Don Floyd, while helping his team earn a tie for the SWC championship with the University of Texas and the University of Arkansas. He also received All-SWC honors on a defense that allowed only eight points per game.

Lilly was a consensus All-American as a senior in 1960 and was a 2006 inductee to the East-West Shrine Game Hall of Fame. He was inducted into the College Football Hall of Fame in 1981. He is a notable brother of Sigma Phi Epsilon fraternity, Texas Gamma chapter.

== Professional career ==
The Dallas Cowboys traded their first-round draft choice in the 1961 NFL draft, as part of the deal to get Eddie LeBaron from the Washington Redskins, so the Cowboys had to trade their first-round pick (#4-Gary Collins) in the 1962 NFL draft along with offensive tackle Paul Dickson, in exchange for the Cleveland Browns' first-round draft choice (13th overall) in 1961, to select Lilly, the first draft choice in franchise history.

Lilly began his career as a defensive end in 1961, but midway through 1963, his third season, Cowboys coach Tom Landry moved him to defensive tackle. Lilly made the adjustment, becoming the main man in Dallas' vaunted "Doomsday Defense". As a tackle, Lilly was a first-team All-NFL choice every year from 1964 through 1969, then again in 1971. In 1970, the Cowboys finally made the Super Bowl, against the Baltimore Colts, only to lose the game (V), 16–13, on a field goal in the final nine seconds; after the game, he tossed his helmet in the air, frustrated at the loss. In 1971, he and the Cowboys convincingly won Super Bowl VI over the Miami Dolphins, 24–3. His 29-yard sack of Dolphins quarterback Bob Griese (at the time an NFL record) is regarded as one of the most memorable plays in Super Bowl defensive history. This was the most famous play of his 14-year hall-of-fame career.

Lilly was named an All-Pro nine times, and was selected to play in 11 Pro Bowl games. He was also drafted in the second round (14th overall) in the 1961 AFL draft by the Dallas Texans (now Kansas City Chiefs). His greatest assets were his pass-rushing skills and his ability to slice plays open with his agility and instincts. Lilly had a distinct stance, the so-called four-point stance, placing both hands on the field instead of the more usual one, generating greater force when rushing straight ahead. Lilly's agility and quickness helped him score four defensive touchdowns in his career. His first was returning an interception 56 yards in 1964, while the other three came on fumble recoveries.

What separated Lilly from other defensive tackles was his combination of agility, conditioning, and strength (although he did not start lifting weights until his sixth season in the NFL), that allowed him to make tackles from sideline to sideline. NFL Films did an eight-minute feature on Lilly and called him the "unblockable, unstoppable, force of the Doomsday Defense". He was regularly double- and triple-teamed for the majority of his career due to his impact in the games. Although the head slap was legal when he played, he never liked to use it to gain an advantage over opponents. Lilly played in 196 consecutive regular-season games. The only NFL game he missed in his career was the 1973 NFC Championship Game loss (10–27) on December 30 against the Minnesota Vikings due to a leg injury. Lilly injured his hamstring in the Cowboys' victory (22–10) against the Denver Broncos on December 2. In the first play of the 1973 NFC Divisional playoff game three weeks later, on December 23 versus the Los Angeles Rams (Cowboys 27-Rams 16), he reinjured the same hamstring.

Affectionately known as "Mr. Cowboy," his name was the first to be inscribed in the Dallas Cowboys Ring of Honor, above Texas Stadium and the current AT&T Stadium. The Cowboys had a Bob Lilly Day on November 23, 1975, to honor him and make Lilly the first inductee into the Ring of Honor. He has attended every ceremony for each Ring of Honor inductee since.

Lilly was inducted into the Pro Football Hall of Fame in 1980, his first year of eligibility, and was the first player who spent his entire career with the Cowboys to be elected to the Pro Football Hall of Fame. He entered the Hall of Fame along with former teammate Herb Adderley (for two seasons), as well as David "Deacon" Jones and Jim Otto. The Sporting News named him a member of the All-Century NFL Team and "the greatest defensive tackle in NFL history". Lilly, Adderley, and Jones were all drafted in 1961. Tom Landry said of Lilly: "As I've said before, another Lilly won't come along in my time. We're observing a man who will become a legend". This comment is from the 1972 Street and Smith's Pro Football Yearbook. He also said that "Nobody is better than Lilly". He is a member of the National Football League 1960s All-Decade Team and National Football League 1970s All-Decade Team.

In 1999, Lilly was ranked number 10 on The Sporting News' list of the 100 Greatest Football Players, the highest-ranking defensive lineman and the highest-ranking Cowboy. The only defensive players ranked ahead of Lilly were Dick Butkus and Lawrence Taylor. Sports Illustrated named him one of the 10 most revolutionary defensive players.

Although the Cowboys do not have a practice to retire jersey numbers, Lilly is the only player to wear #74 in team history (with the exception of preseason games).

== Personal life ==
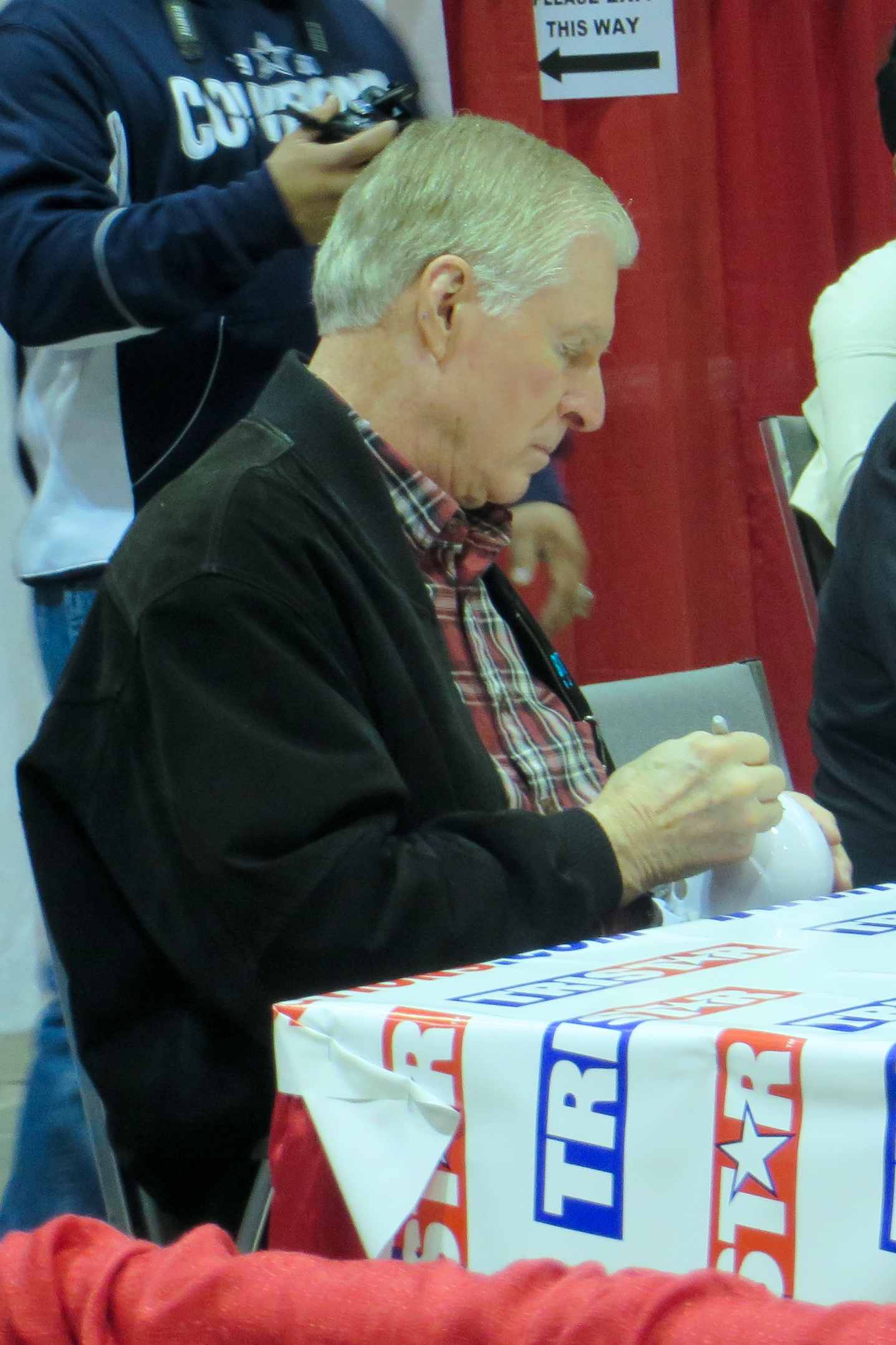
Lilly as he signs autographs in 2014

When he began traveling with the Cowboys, Lilly regularly had his camera at his side. His interest in photography began when he was named to the College Football All-America Team in 1961, which was sponsored by Kodak. As a part of the honor, he was given a 35 mm camera and a year's supply of film by the company. Before and after games, he spent an increasing amount of time studying and photographing old sports stadiums. Lilly co-authored the 1983 book Bob Lilly Reflections with sportswriter Sam Blair, featuring scores of his black-and-white photographs of teammates in candid poses. He was also a photographer for the Texas Air National Guard where he was an airman 2nd class. Lilly spent two weeks in 1967 as part of the Texas National Guard at the Rhein-Main Air Base in West Germany.

After his retirement from professional football, Lilly moved to Waco, Texas, where he successfully operated a beer distribution business until 1982, when he saw the impact of a traffic accident caused by drunken driving and decided to sell the company and launch his landscape photography career. He lived in Las Cruces, New Mexico, from 1984 to 1989, where he opened a photo art gallery, complete with both color and black-and-white darkrooms. In 1989, he moved back to Texas, settling in Graham. As of 2016, the grandfather of 12 and great-grandfather of three lives with his wife, Ann, whom he married in 1974, in Georgetown, Texas.
