= Munday Consolidated Independent School District =

School district in Texas, United States

Munday Consolidated Independent School District (MCISD) is a public school district based in Munday, Texas, United States. In addition to Munday, the district also serves the city of Goree. Located primarily in southeastern Knox County, small portions of the district extend into northeastern Haskell and northwestern Throckmorton Counties.

In 2010, the school district was rated "recognized" by the Texas Education Agency.

== History ==
On July 1, 2003, the Munday Independent School District consolidated with the Goree Independent School District and adopted its current name.

== Schools ==
- Munday Secondary School (grades 7–12)
- Munday Elementary School (prekindergarten - grade 6)
