= Throckmorton Collegiate Independent School District =

School district in Texas

Throckmorton Collegiate Independent School District is a public school district based in Throckmorton, Texas, United States..

In 2009, the district was rated "academically acceptable" by the Texas Education Agency.

In 2018, the name of the district was changed from Throckmorton ISD to Throckmorton Collegiate ISD.

As of 2026, the district principal is Carley Youngblood, and the superintendent is Nick Heupel

== Schools ==
Throckmorton College Independent School District contains one school which serves grades pre-kindergarten through 12.
