= Goree, Texas =

City in the United States

- City
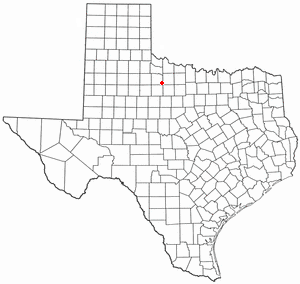
- Location of Goree, Texas

- Coordinates: 33°28′7″N 99°31′26″W
- Country: United States
- State: Texas
- County: Knox

Area
  - Total: 1.45 sq mi (3.75 km^{2})
  - Land: 1.45 sq mi (3.75 km^{2})
  - Water: 0 sq mi (0.00 km^{2})
- Elevation: 1,453 ft (443 m)

Population (2020)
  - Total: 158
  - Density: 109/sq mi (42.1/km^{2})
- Time zone: UTC-6 (Central (CST))
  - Summer (DST): UTC-5 (CDT)
- ZIP code: 76363
- Area code: 940
- FIPS code: 48-30296
- GNIS feature ID: 1358194

Historical population
Census	Pop.	Note	%±
1920	614		—
1930	457		−25.6%
1940	425		−7.0%
1950	640		50.6%
1960	543		−15.2%
1970	538		−0.9%
1980	524		−2.6%
1990	412		−21.4%
2000	321		−22.1%
2010	203		−36.8%
2020	158		−22.2%
U.S. Decennial Census

Goree is a city in Knox County, Texas, United States. Its population was 158 at the 2020 census, down from 203 at the 2010 census.

== Geography ==
Goree is located at 33°28′7″N 99°31′26″W (33.468707, –99.523874). It is situated at the junction of U.S. Highway 277 and FM 266 in southeastern Knox County, about 84 miles north of Abilene.

According to the United States Census Bureau, the city has a total area of 1.5 square miles (3.9 km^{2}), all land.

== History ==
Settlers first arrived in the area around 1886. By 1887, a settlement was centered around a store and post office built by Bill Benedict. Originally known as Riley Springs, the community was renamed Goree after Robert D. Goree, a Confederate veteran and Knox County pioneer. Benedict's store was bought by J.W. McLendon in 1890; he moved it with its post office to a new site that became known as North Goree. A school was built near the relocated store in 1901. In 1904, North Goree was renamed Hefner.

At its present-day location, the first plans for a new community began in 1905 with the announcement that the Wichita Valley Railroad would be built through the area. An important year in Goree's history, 1906 had the railroad arrive, homes and businesses were erected, and the community became an incorporated municipality. The school relocated from the Hefner location to Goree in 1906, and was renamed Chigger Hill School.

Goree had a population of 614 in 1920, but that figure had fallen to 425 by 1940. The number of residents rose to 640 in 1950, but declined throughout the remainder of the 20th century.

== Demographics ==
=== 2020 census ===
As of the 2020 census, Goree had a population of 158 and a median age of 42.0 years; 24.7% of residents were under the age of 18 and 18.4% of residents were 65 years of age or older. For every 100 females there were 85.9 males, and for every 100 females age 18 and over there were 91.9 males age 18 and over.

0.0% of residents lived in urban areas, while 100.0% lived in rural areas.

There were 65 households in Goree, of which 40.0% had children under the age of 18 living in them. Of all households, 40.0% were married-couple households, 24.6% were households with a male householder and no spouse or partner present, and 29.2% were households with a female householder and no spouse or partner present. About 21.6% of all households were made up of individuals and 16.9% had someone living alone who was 65 years of age or older.

There were 107 housing units, of which 39.3% were vacant. The homeowner vacancy rate was 6.2% and the rental vacancy rate was 7.7%.

Racial composition as of the 2020 census
Race	Number	Percent
White	109	69.0%
Black or African American	10	6.3%
American Indian and Alaska Native	0	0.0%
Asian	1	0.6%
Native Hawaiian and Other Pacific Islander	0	0.0%
Some other race	21	13.3%
Two or more races	17	10.8%
Hispanic or Latino (of any race)	55	34.8%

=== 2000 census ===
As of the 2000 census, 321 people, 116 households, and 88 families resided in the city. The population density was 220.7 inhabitants per square mile (85.2/km^{2}). The 157 housing units had an average density of 107.9 per square mile (41.7/km^{2}). The racial makeup of the city was 61.37% White, 8.10% African American, 3.74% Native American, 25.23% from other races, and 1.56% from two or more races. Hispanics or Latinos of any race were 43.30% of the population.

Of the 116 households, 32.8% had children under 18 living with them, 56.9% were married couples living together, 12.9% had a female householder with no husband present, and 24.1% were not families. About 21.6% of all households were made up of individuals, and 14.7% had someone living alone who was 65 or older. The average household size was 2.77 and the average family size was 3.16. The city's age distribution was 31.2% under 18, 5.0% from 18 to 24, 24.9% from 25 to 44, 20.2% from 45 to 64, and 18.7% who were 65 or older. The median age was 36 years. For every 100 females, there were 92.2 males. For every 100 females 18 and over, there were 88.9 males.

The median income for a household in the city was $25,104, and the median income for a family was $25,556. Males had a median income of $19,063 versus $20,536 for females. The per capita income for the city was $13,169. About 24.4% of families and 31.8% of the population were below the poverty line, including 59.8% of those under 18 and 10.1% of those 65 or over.

== Education ==
Munday Consolidated Independent School District operates public schools serving the community. The City of Goree was served by the Goree Independent School District until July 1, 2003, when it merged with the Munday Independent School District, forming the Munday CISD.

The school in Goree was used as the Munday Junior High, serving the district's seventh- and eighth-grade students until about 2009. It is now used as the Knox Prairie Event Center, which hosts the Knox Prairie Quilt Show every February.

== Bobby Boatright Memorial Music Camp ==
Goree is the site of the annual Bobby Boatright Memorial Music Camp, an event for aspiring Western swing musicians of all ages to hone and showcase their musical talents. The camp is named for the late Bobby Boatright, Western swing musician, who was chief fiddle instructor before his death in 2008. The camp was profiled in a story that aired on July 21, 2010 on National Public Radio's Morning Edition program.
