= Benjamin Independent School District =

School district in Texas, United States

Coordinates: 33.58389°N 99.79681°W

Location
- Benjamin, Texas ESC Region 9 USA

District information
- Type: Independent school district
- Grades: Pre-K through 12
- Superintendent: Olivia del Hierro Gloria
- Schools: 1 (2009-10)
- NCES District ID: 4809980

Students and staff
- Students: 100 (2010-11)
- Teachers: 12.50 (2009-10) (on full-time equivalent (FTE) basis)
- Student–teacher ratio: 6.88 (2009-10)
- Athletic conference: UIL Class 1A 6-man Football Division II
- District mascot: Mustangs
- Colors: Purple, white

Other information
- TEA District Accountability Rating for 2011: Recognized
- Website: Benjamin ISD

Benjamin Independent School District is a public school district based in Benjamin, Texas (USA).

== Finances ==
In the 2010–2011 school year, the appraised valuation of property in the district was $27,477,000. The maintenance tax rate was $0.117 and the bond tax rate was $0.000 per $100 of appraised valuation.

By fiscal years 2019-2020, total revenue was $2,346,000 ($18,919 per student). Total expenditures reached $2,307,000 ($18,605 per student).

== Academic achievement ==
In 2011, the school district was rated "recognized" by the Texas Education Agency.

== Schools ==
In the 2011–2012 school year, the district had one school (Benjamin School) that served students in grades pre-kindergarten through twelve.

== See also ==
- List of school districts in Texas
