= Throckmorton, Texas =

- Town
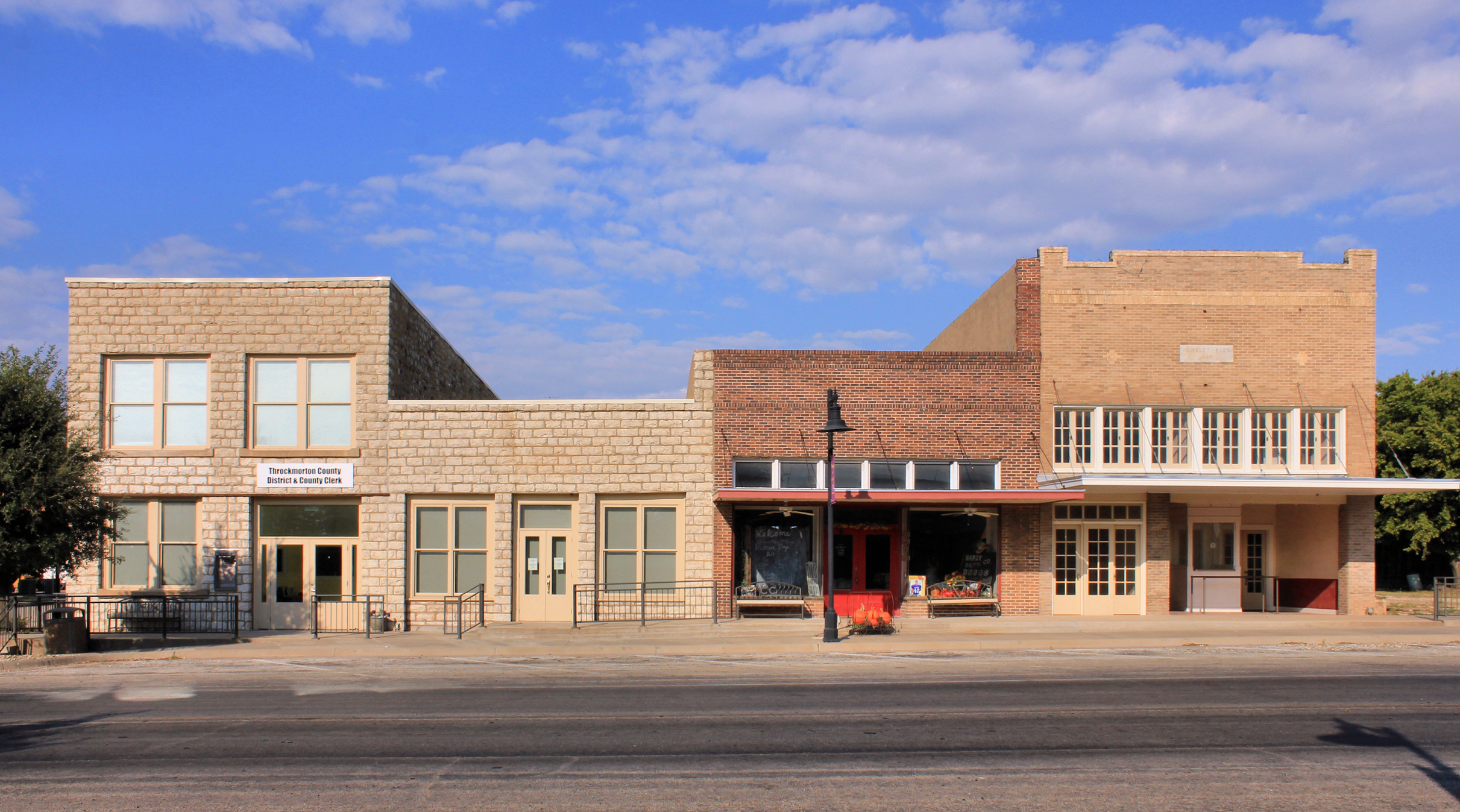
- Downtown Throckmorton in 2015

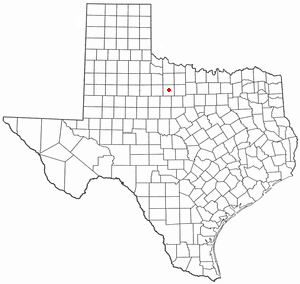
- Location of Throckmorton, Texas

- Coordinates: 33°10′55″N 99°10′47″W
- Country: United States
- State: Texas
- County: Throckmorton

Area
  - Total: 1.66 sq mi (4.29 km^{2})
  - Land: 1.66 sq mi (4.29 km^{2})
  - Water: 0 sq mi (0.00 km^{2})
- Elevation: 1,362 ft (415 m)

Population (2020)
  - Total: 727
  - Density: 439/sq mi (169/km^{2})
- Time zone: UTC-6 (Central (CST))
  - Summer (DST): UTC-5 (CDT)
- ZIP code: 76483
- Area code: 940
- FIPS code: 48-72896
- GNIS feature ID: 2413388
- Website: throckmortontx.org

Throckmorton is a town in Throckmorton County, Texas, United States. Its population was 727 at the 2020 census. It is the county seat of Throckmorton County.

== Geography ==
According to the United States Census Bureau, the town has a total area of 1.7 sq mi (4.4 km^{2}), all of it land.

=== Climate ===
The climate in this area is characterized by hot, humid summers and generally mild to cool winters. According to the Köppen climate classification, Throckmorton has a humid subtropical climate, Cfa on climate maps.

== Demographics ==
Historical population
Census	Pop.	Note	%±
1880	37		—
1890	240		548.6%
1920	686		—
1930	1,135		65.5%
1940	1,133		−0.2%
1950	1,320		16.5%
1960	1,299		−1.6%
1970	1,105		−14.9%
1980	1,174		6.2%
1990	1,036		−11.8%
2000	905		−12.6%
2010	828		−8.5%
2020	727		−12.2%
U.S. Decennial Census

=== 2020 census ===
Throckmorton racial composition (NH = Non-Hispanic) (Note: Note: the US Census treats Hispanic/Latino as an ethnic category. This table excludes Latinos from the racial categories and assigns them to a separate category. Hispanics/Latinos can be of any race.)
Race	Number	Percentage
White (NH)	616	84.73%
Black or African American (NH)	1	0.14%
Native American or Alaska Native (NH)	1	0.14%
Asian (NH)	1	0.14%
Mixed/Multi-Racial (NH)	24	3.3%
Hispanic or Latino	84	11.55%
Total	727	

As of the 2020 United States census, there were 727 people, 337 households, and 169 families residing in the town.

=== 2010 census ===
As of the census of 2010, 828 people, a decrease of 8.51% since 2000, lived in Throckmorton. The city had 477 housing units, with 116 of them vacant. The racial makeup of the town was 93.50% White, 0.12% African American, 0.97% Native American, 0.48% Asian, 4.11% from other races, and 0.85% from two or more races. Hispanics or Latinos of any race were 10.27% of the population.

=== 2000 census ===
As of the census of 2000, 905 people, 386 households, and 265 families resided in the town. The population density was 539.4 people/sq mi (208.0/km^{2}). The 477 housing units averaged 284.3/sq mi (109.6/km^{2}). The racial makeup of the town was 90.50% White, 0.11% African American, 0.11% Native American, 7.29% from other races, and 1.99% from two or more races. Hispanics or Latinos of any race were 12.04% of the population.

Of the 386 households, 29.8% had children under the age of 18 living with them, 55.2% were married couples living together, 10.6% had a female householder with no husband present, and 31.1% were not families. About 29.0% of all households were made up of individuals, and 16.8% had someone living alone who was 65 years of age or older. The average household size was 2.34 and the average family size was 2.87.

In the town, the population was distributed as 25.4% under the age of 18, 5.3% from 18 to 24, 23.5% from 25 to 44 26.4% from 45 to 64, and 19.3% who were 65 years of age or older. The median age was 42 years. For every 100 females, there were 100.2 males. For every 100 females age 18 and over, there were 91.2 males.

The median income for a household in the town was $29,453, and for a family was $36,250. Males had a median income of $22,778 versus $20,625 for females. The per capita income for the town was $16,400. About 11.7% of families and 16.0% of the population were below the poverty line, including 26.7% of those under age 18 and 7.7% of those age 65 or over.

== Education ==
The Town of Throckmorton is served by the Throckmorton Collegiate Independent School District and home to the Throckmorton High School Greyhounds.

== Notable people ==
- Deborah Scaling Kiley, a sailor, author, and shipwreck survivor, was born in Throckmorton.
- Bob Lilly, a Pro Football Hall of Fame defensive tackle for the Dallas Cowboys
- Dexter and the Moonrocks, alternative rock band
