= Knox County, Texas =

County in Texas, United States

- County
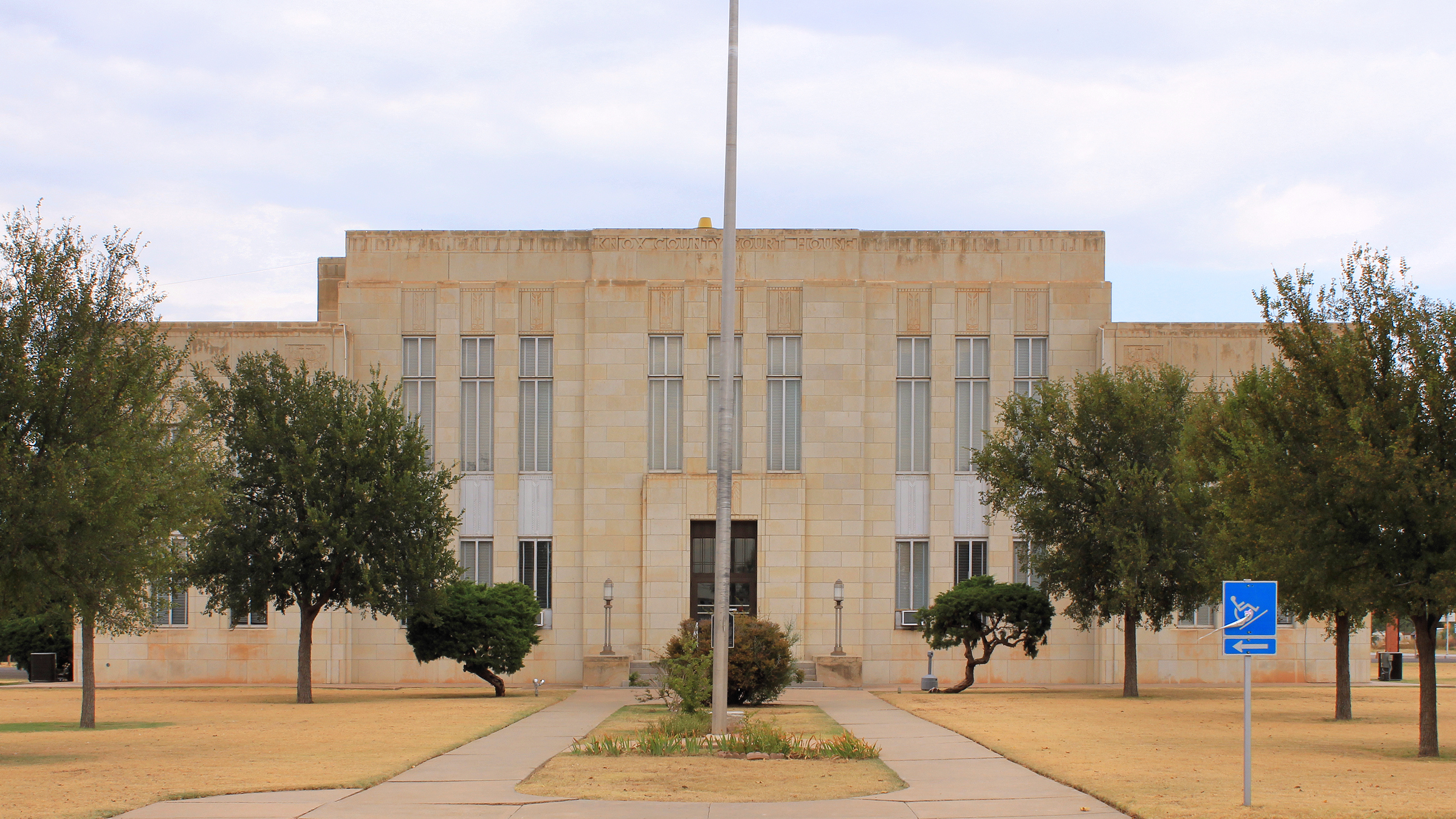
- The Knox County Courthouse in Benjamin

- Location within the U.S. state of Texas
- Coordinates: 33°37′N 99°44′W
- Country: United States
- State: Texas
- Founded: 1886
- Named for: Henry Knox
- Seat: Benjamin
- Largest city: Munday

Area
  - Total: 855 sq mi (2,210 km^{2})
  - Land: 851 sq mi (2,200 km^{2})
  - Water: 4.9 sq mi (13 km^{2}) 0.6%

Population (2020)
  - Total: 3,353
  - Estimate (2025): 3,192 ▼
  - Density: 3.94/sq mi (1.52/km^{2})
- Time zone: UTC−6 (Central)
  - Summer (DST): UTC−5 (CDT)
- Congressional district: 13th
- Website: www.knoxcountytexas.org

Knox County is a county located in the U.S. state of Texas. As of the 2020 census, its population was 3,353. Its county seat is Benjamin. The county was created in 1858 and later organized in 1886. It is named for Henry Knox, an American Revolutionary War general.

== Geography ==
According to the U.S. Census Bureau, the county has a total area of 855 sq mi (2,210 km^{2}), of which 4.9 sq mi (13 km^{2}) (0.6%) are covered by water.

=== Major highways ===
- U.S. Highway 82/State Highway 114
- U.S. Highway 277
- State Highway 6
- State Highway 222
- Spur 357

=== Adjacent counties ===
- Foard County (north)
- Baylor County (east)
- Haskell County (south)
- King County (west)
- Stonewall County (southwest)
- Throckmorton County (southeast)

=== Notable geographic features ===
- The Narrows

== Demographics ==
Historical population
Census	Pop.	Note	%±
1880	77		—
1890	1,134		1,372.7%
1900	2,322		104.8%
1910	9,625		314.5%
1920	9,240		−4.0%
1930	11,368		23.0%
1940	10,090		−11.2%
1950	10,082		−0.1%
1960	7,857		−22.1%
1970	5,972		−24.0%
1980	5,329		−10.8%
1990	4,837		−9.2%
2000	4,253		−12.1%
2010	3,719		−12.6%
2020	3,353		−9.8%
2025 (est.)	3,192	▼	−4.8%
U.S. Decennial Census; 1850–2010 2010 2020

=== Racial and ethnic composition ===
Knox County, Texas – Racial and ethnic composition Note: the US Census treats Hispanic/Latino as an ethnic category. This table excludes Latinos from the racial categories and assigns them to a separate category. Hispanics/Latinos may be of any race.
Race / Ethnicity (NH = Non-Hispanic)	Pop 1980	Pop 1990	Pop 2000	Pop 2010	Pop 2020	% 1980	% 1990	% 2000	% 2010	% 2020
White alone (NH)	3,977	3,396	2,829	2,347	1,935	74.63%	70.21%	66.52%	63.11%	57.71%
Black or African American alone (NH)	384	335	292	209	146	7.21%	6.93%	6.87%	5.62%	4.35%
Native American or Alaska Native alone (NH)	6	6	10	14	8	0.11%	0.12%	0.24%	0.38%	0.24%
Asian alone (NH)	4	5	10	7	24	0.08%	0.10%	0.24%	0.19%	0.72%
Native Hawaiian or Pacific Islander alone (NH)	x	x	3	1	3	x	x	0.07%	0.03%	0.09%
Other race alone (NH)	15	7	0	4	5	0.28%	0.14%	0.00%	0.11%	0.15%
Mixed race or Multiracial (NH)	x	x	42	36	102	x	x	0.99%	0.97%	3.04%
Hispanic or Latino (any race)	943	1,088	1,067	1,101	1,130	17.70%	22.49%	25.09%	29.60%	33.70%
Total	5,329	4,837	4,253	3,719	3,353	100.00%	100.00%	100.00%	100.00%	100.00%

=== 2020 census ===
As of the 2020 census, the county had a population of 3,353. The median age was 42.7 years. 24.7% of residents were under the age of 18 and 22.6% of residents were 65 years of age or older. For every 100 females there were 100.3 males, and for every 100 females age 18 and over there were 96.6 males age 18 and over.

The racial makeup of the county was 71.4% White, 4.9% Black or African American, 0.3% American Indian and Alaska Native, 0.7% Asian, 0.1% Native Hawaiian and Pacific Islander, 13.5% from some other race, and 9.1% from two or more races. Hispanic or Latino residents of any race comprised 33.7% of the population.

<0.1% of residents lived in urban areas, while 100.0% lived in rural areas.

There were 1,321 households in the county, of which 31.6% had children under the age of 18 living in them. Of all households, 51.8% were married-couple households, 19.1% were households with a male householder and no spouse or partner present, and 25.3% were households with a female householder and no spouse or partner present. About 27.1% of all households were made up of individuals and 14.7% had someone living alone who was 65 years of age or older.

There were 1,801 housing units, of which 26.7% were vacant. Among occupied housing units, 79.7% were owner-occupied and 20.3% were renter-occupied. The homeowner vacancy rate was 3.2% and the rental vacancy rate was 21.2%.

=== 2000 census ===
As of the 2000 census, 4,253 people, 1,690 households, and 1,166 were families residing in the county. The population density was 5 people/mi^{2} (1.9 people/km^{2}). The 2,129 housing units had an average density of two units per square mile (0.77 units/km^{2}). The racial makeup of the county was 74.35% White, 6.91% African American, 1.08% Native American, 0.24% Asian, 0.09% Pacific Islander, 14.77% from other races, and 2.56% from two or more races. About 25.09% of the population was Hispanic or Latino of any race.

Of the 1,690 households, 30.7% had children under 18 living with them, 56.0% were married couples living together, 9.9% had a female householder with no husband present, and 31.0% were not families. About 29.6% of all households were made up of individuals, and 17.9% had someone living alone who was 65 or older. The average household size was 2.44, and the average family size was 3.02.

In the county, the age distribution was 27.7% under 18, 5.6% from 18 to 24, 22.9% from 25 to 44, 21.0% from 45 to 64, and 22.7% who were 65 or older. The median age was 40 years. For every 100 females, there were 89.40 males. For every 100 females age 18 and over, there were 87.80 males.

The median income for a household in the county was $25,453, and for a family was $30,602. Males had a median income of $25,571 versus $20,865 for females. The per capita income for the county was $13,443. About 17.1% of families and 22.9% of the population were below the poverty line, including 35.2% of those under age 18 and 15.2% of those age 65 or over.

== Education ==
These school districts serve Knox County:

- Benjamin Independent School District (ISD)
- Crowell ISD (mostly in Foard County; small portion in King County)
- Knox City-O'Brien Consolidated ISD (partly in Haskell County)
- Munday Consolidated ISD (small portions in Haskell and Throckmorton Counties)
- Seymour ISD (mostly in Baylor County)

Goree Independent School District formerly served sections of the county. On July 1, 2003, it merged into Munday CISD.

The county is in the service area of Vernon College.

== Bobby Boatright Memorial Music Camp ==
The city of Goree in Knox County is the site of the annual Bobby Boatright Memorial Music Camp, an event for aspiring Western swing musicians of all ages to showcase their musical talents. The camp's namesake was a fiddle player who was originally from Goree. The camp was profiled in a story that aired on July 21, 2010, on National Public Radio's Morning Edition program.

== Communities ==
=== Cities ===
- Benjamin (county seat)
- Goree
- Munday

=== Town ===
- Knox City

=== Unincorporated communities ===
- Rhineland
- Truscott
- Vera

== Politics ==
Knox County is represented in the Texas House of Representatives by the Republican James Frank, a businessman from Wichita Falls. The 1932 Texas Republican gubernatorial nominee, Orville Bullington, resided in Knox County and served as county attorney early in his career.

Knox County is located within District 69 of the Texas House of Representatives. Knox County is located within District 28 of the Texas Senate.

United States presidential election results for Knox County, Texas
Year	Republican		Democratic		Third party(ies)	
Year	No.	%	No.	%	No.	%
1912	32	3.74%	643	75.12%	181	21.14%
1916	64	6.07%	884	83.79%	107	10.14%
1920	159	15.44%	773	75.05%	98	9.51%
1924	455	23.51%	1,399	72.30%	81	4.19%
1928	992	55.70%	784	44.02%	5	0.28%
1932	102	5.98%	1,600	93.79%	4	0.23%
1936	171	8.55%	1,823	91.15%	6	0.30%
1940	253	12.96%	1,699	87.04%	0	0.00%
1944	156	7.28%	1,785	83.33%	201	9.38%
1948	157	7.82%	1,792	89.24%	59	2.94%
1952	1,033	39.88%	1,556	60.08%	1	0.04%
1956	835	39.76%	1,262	60.10%	3	0.14%
1960	729	34.75%	1,365	65.06%	4	0.19%
1964	439	19.81%	1,773	80.01%	4	0.18%
1968	580	27.27%	1,222	57.45%	325	15.28%
1972	1,148	63.78%	638	35.44%	14	0.78%
1976	551	26.75%	1,498	72.72%	11	0.53%
1980	783	39.79%	1,163	59.10%	22	1.12%
1984	1,027	52.61%	921	47.18%	4	0.20%
1988	765	42.93%	1,013	56.85%	4	0.22%
1992	521	28.71%	854	47.05%	440	24.24%
1996	599	38.97%	785	51.07%	153	9.95%
2000	947	60.09%	617	39.15%	12	0.76%
2004	1,081	69.65%	464	29.90%	7	0.45%
2008	986	72.08%	367	26.83%	15	1.10%
2012	1,160	76.82%	332	21.99%	18	1.19%
2016	1,078	78.86%	247	18.07%	42	3.07%
2020	1,180	80.99%	265	18.19%	12	0.82%
2024	1,156	84.01%	214	15.55%	6	0.44%

United States Senate election results for Knox County, Texas1
Year	Republican		Democratic		Third party(ies)	
Year	No.	%	No.	%	No.	%
2024	1,096	80.35%	249	18.26%	19	1.39%

United States Senate election results for Knox County, Texas2
Year	Republican		Democratic		Third party(ies)	
Year	No.	%	No.	%	No.	%
2020	1,147	80.15%	263	18.38%	21	1.47%

Texas Gubernatorial election results for Knox County
Year	Republican		Democratic		Third party(ies)	
Year	No.	%	No.	%	No.	%
2022	889	85.48%	140	13.46%	11	1.06%

== See also ==
- Dry counties
- National Register of Historic Places listings in Knox County, Texas
- Recorded Texas Historic Landmarks in Knox County
