= Munday, Texas =

- City
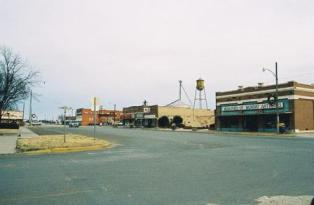
- Main Street in Munday

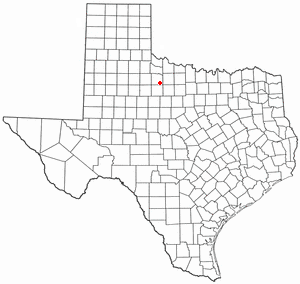
- Location of Munday, Texas

- Coordinates: 33°26′51″N 99°37′37″W
- Country: United States
- State: Texas
- County: Knox

Area
  - Total: 1.43 sq mi (3.70 km^{2})
  - Land: 1.43 sq mi (3.70 km^{2})
  - Water: 0 sq mi (0.00 km^{2})
- Elevation: 1,480 ft (450 m)

Population (2020)
  - Total: 1,246
  - Density: 893.4/sq mi (344.94/km^{2})
- Time zone: UTC-6 (Central (CST))
  - Summer (DST): UTC-5 (CDT)
- ZIP code: 76371
- Area code: 940
- FIPS code: 48-50040
- GNIS feature ID: 2411195
- Website: www.mundaytexas.com

Munday (/ˈmʌndi/ MUN-dee) is a city in Knox County, Texas, United States. The population was 1,246 at the 2020 census.

== Geography ==
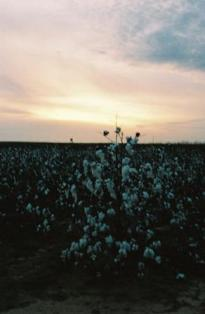
Cotton field west of Munday

Munday is located at the junction of U.S. Highway 277, State Highway 222, and Farm Roads 1581 and 2811 in southeastern Knox County.

Munday is approximately 75 miles from both Abilene and Wichita Falls.

According to the United States Census Bureau, the city has a total area of 1.4 square miles (3.6 km^{2}), all land.

=== Climate ===
The climate in this area is characterized by hot, humid summers and generally mild to cool winters. According to the Köppen Climate Classification system, Munday has a humid subtropical climate, abbreviated "Cfa" on climate maps.

Climate data for Munday, Texas (1991–2020)
Month	Jan	Feb	Mar	Apr	May	Jun	Jul	Aug	Sep	Oct	Nov	Dec	Year
Mean daily maximum °F (°C)	58.3 (14.6)	62.4 (16.9)	70.7 (21.5)	80.1 (26.7)	86.5 (30.3)	93.6 (34.2)	97.1 (36.2)	96.7 (35.9)	88.9 (31.6)	81.0 (27.2)	67.7 (19.8)	58.6 (14.8)	78.5 (25.8)
Daily mean °F (°C)	44.9 (7.2)	48.7 (9.3)	56.8 (13.8)	65.0 (18.3)	73.7 (23.2)	81.4 (27.4)	84.8 (29.3)	84.0 (28.9)	76.3 (24.6)	66.4 (19.1)	54.4 (12.4)	45.7 (7.6)	65.2 (18.4)
Mean daily minimum °F (°C)	31.4 (−0.3)	35.0 (1.7)	42.8 (6.0)	49.8 (9.9)	60.8 (16.0)	69.2 (20.7)	72.6 (22.6)	71.4 (21.9)	63.7 (17.6)	51.9 (11.1)	41.2 (5.1)	32.7 (0.4)	51.9 (11.1)
Average precipitation inches (mm)	1.31 (33)	1.41 (36)	1.87 (47)	1.77 (45)	3.94 (100)	3.61 (92)	2.88 (73)	2.55 (65)	2.12 (54)	1.85 (47)	1.16 (29)	1.23 (31)	25.7 (652)
Average snowfall inches (cm)	1.3 (3.3)	0.6 (1.5)	0.4 (1.0)	0.0 (0.0)	0.0 (0.0)	0.0 (0.0)	0.0 (0.0)	0.0 (0.0)	0.0 (0.0)	0.0 (0.0)	1.6 (4.1)	0.4 (1.0)	4.3 (10.9)
Source: NOAA

== History ==
The community dates from 1893, when a store was built at the site. Originally known as Maud, it was renamed for postmaster R.P. Munday when the first post office was established in 1894. In 1903, West Munday merchants—separated by a thousand yards from East Munday—moved their buildings to the east. The Wichita Valley Railroad arrived in 1906, the same year that the community incorporated. With 968 residents in 1910, Munday was easily the largest town in Knox County. By 1950, the population reached 2,270. The population slowly decreased throughout the latter half of the twentieth century. Attractions in Munday include a nine-hole golf course, county library, city park, and antique shops.

Cotton has continued to be a major agricultural crop in the Munday area and remains a significant component of the local economy. W. A. Earnest built a gin in 1900, and thereafter cotton processing remained significant, but Munday also became a center for vegetable processing, since irrigation encouraged local farmers to raise onions, potatoes, cucumbers, melons, and other produce. Texas A&M University opened a vegetable research center in Munday in 1971.

== Demographics ==
Historical population
Census	Pop.	Note	%±
1910	956		—
1920	998		4.4%
1930	1,318		32.1%
1940	1,545		17.2%
1950	2,270		46.9%
1960	1,978		−12.9%
1970	1,726		−12.7%
1980	1,738		0.7%
1990	1,600		−7.9%
2000	1,527		−4.6%
2010	1,300		−14.9%
2020	1,246		−4.2%
U.S. Decennial Census

=== 2020 census ===
As of the 2020 census, Munday had a population of 1,246. The median age was 39.0 years. 27.6% of residents were under the age of 18 and 19.5% of residents were 65 years of age or older. For every 100 females there were 96.8 males, and for every 100 females age 18 and over there were 90.7 males age 18 and over.

There were 453 households in Munday, of which 37.5% had children under the age of 18 living in them. Of all households, 50.8% were married-couple households, 18.8% were households with a male householder and no spouse or partner present, and 26.0% were households with a female householder and no spouse or partner present. About 27.4% of all households were made up of individuals and 14.8% had someone living alone who was 65 years of age or older.

There were 613 housing units, of which 26.1% were vacant. The homeowner vacancy rate was 3.0% and the rental vacancy rate was 32.7%.

0.0% of residents lived in urban areas, while 100.0% lived in rural areas.

Racial composition as of the 2020 census
Race	Number	Percent
White	820	65.8%
Black or African American	88	7.1%
American Indian and Alaska Native	3	0.2%
Asian	12	1.0%
Native Hawaiian and Other Pacific Islander	0	0.0%
Some other race	206	16.5%
Two or more races	117	9.4%
Hispanic or Latino (of any race)	554	44.5%

Munday racial composition (NH = Non-Hispanic) (Note: Note: the US Census treats Hispanic/Latino as an ethnic category. This table excludes Latinos from the racial categories and assigns them to a separate category. Hispanics/Latinos can be of any race.)
Race	Number	Percentage
White (NH)	570	45.75%
Black or African American (NH)	72	5.78%
Native American or Alaska Native (NH)	3	0.24%
Asian (NH)	12	0.96%
Some Other Race (NH)	2	0.16%
Mixed/Multi-Racial (NH)	33	2.65%
Hispanic or Latino	554	44.46%
Total	1,246	

=== 2010 census ===
As of the census of 2010, there were 1,300 people, a decrease of 14.87% since 2000 (227 people). The racial makeup of the town was 70.46% White (916 people), 7.00% African American (91 people), 0.46% Native American (6 people), 18.85% from other races (245 people), and 3.23% from two or more races (42 people). Hispanic or Latino of any race were 38.23% of the population (497 people).

=== 2000 census ===
As of the census of 2000, there were 1,527 people, 597 households, and 404 families residing in the city. The population density was 1,078.5 inhabitants per square mile (416.4/km^{2}). There were 701 housing units at an average density of 495.1 per square mile (191.2/km^{2}). The racial makeup of the city was 69.48% White (1,061 people), 8.51% African American (130 people), 1.05% Native American (16 people), 0.20% Pacific Islander (3 people), 17.81% from other races (272 people), and 2.95% from two or more races (45 people). Hispanic or Latino of any race were 30.58% of the population (467 people).

There were 597 households, out of which 33.5% had children under the age of 18 living with them, 53.6% were married couples living together, 11.2% had a female householder with no husband present, and 32.2% were non-families. 31.0% of all households were made up of individuals, and 18.6% had someone living alone who was 65 years of age or older. The average household size was 2.47 and the average family size was 3.12.

In the city, the population was spread out, with 30.0% under the age of 18, 5.4% from 18 to 24, 23.7% from 25 to 44, 17.6% from 45 to 64, and 23.2% who were 65 years of age or older. The median age was 37 years. For every 100 females, there were 87.4 males. For every 100 females age 18 and over, there were 82.1 males.

The median income for a household in the city was $22,708, and the median income for a family was $28,158. Males had a median income of $22,303 versus $20,769 for females. The per capita income for the city was $11,593. About 21.8% of families and 29.1% of the population were below the poverty line, including 43.5% of those under age 18 and 17.0% of those age 65 or over.

== Education ==
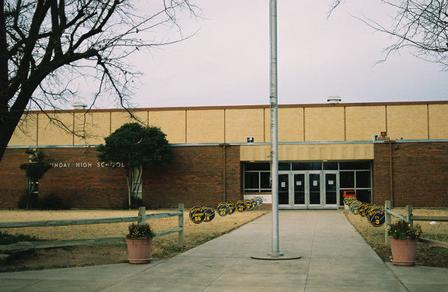
Front entrance to Munday High School

The City of Munday is served by the Munday Consolidated Independent School District.

Munday High School is rated an Recognized campus by the Texas Education Agency (2010). The High School's mascot is the Moguls and school colors are purple and gold. The Mogul football team won the Class A State Championship in 1984, 2007, and 2012. The Mogulette track team won the State Championship five times; in 1988,'89,'90,'91, and '99. They were also State Champions in Cross Country twice; in 1988 and '89. The Mogul track team won State in 1985,'88,'90,'91, 2011, 2012, and 2013. They still hold the State record in the 1600 meter relay and were named to the UIL All Century Track Team. The Munday High School Purple Cloud Band has won the Texas 1A Honor Band Competition twice, in 1994 and 2000. Munday's One Act Play has advanced to the State OAP Meet 10 times, winning the State Championship in '93, finishing second runner-up in '97, and first runner-up in 2008. The school also has three State CX Debate championships. The 2019 competitors were Destyn Mauldin and Jonah Hernandez; Catalina Perry and Julie Valk also competed in the state meet and were only two points from finals, while Jonah Hernandez and Destyn Mauldin finished four points short. Catalina Perry competed at the state Congress contest in 2020 and made it to the state finals and placed in the top 15.
