= Benjamin, Texas =

- City
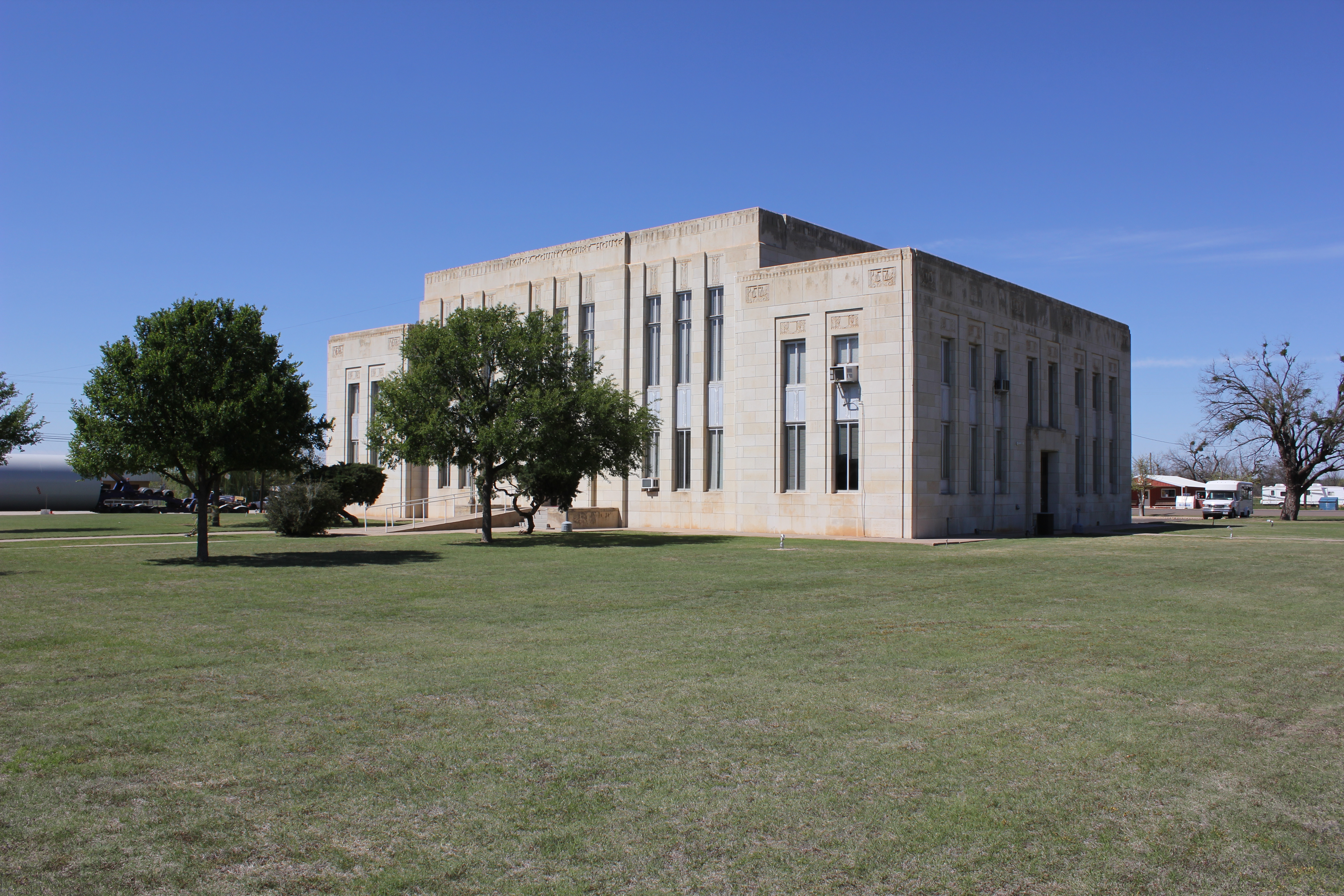
- Knox County Courthouse in Benjamin
- Interactive map of Benjamin, Texas
- Coordinates: 33°35′0″N 99°47′36″W
- Country: United States
- State: Texas
- County: Knox
- Incorporated (city): 1928

Government
  - Type: Council-manager
  - Misty Weiser: Manager

Area
  - Total: 1.05 sq mi (2.72 km^{2})
  - Land: 1.05 sq mi (2.72 km^{2})
  - Water: 0 sq mi (0.00 km^{2})
- Elevation: 1,480 ft (450 m)

Population (2020)
  - Total: 196
  - Density: 187/sq mi (72.1/km^{2})
- Time zone: UTC-6 (Central (CST))
  - Summer (DST): UTC-5 (CDT)
- ZIP code: 79505
- Area code: 940
- FIPS code: 48-07636
- GNIS feature ID: 1351877

Benjamin is a city in and the county seat of Knox County, Texas, United States. Its population was 196 at the 2020 census, making it one of the least-populated county seats in Texas.

== History ==
The community was founded in 1884 by Hilory G. Bedford, president and controlling stockholder in the Wichita and Brazos Stock Company. He named it Benjamin after his son, who had been killed by lightning. To attract additional settlers, Bedford gave his stockholders a 50-acre tract of land and set aside 40 more acres for a town square. Benjamin was designed as the Knox County seat when it was organized in 1886; a school also opened in that year. A jail built in 1887 still stands as a private residence, and the old bank stands next to the sheriff's office. Benjamin was incorporated in 1928, and the population was 485 in the 1930 census. Two structures in the community, a courthouse (1938) and school building (1942), were constructed with Works Projects Administration labor. That courthouse replaced the previous stone structure built in 1888. The number of inhabitants reached a high of 599 in 1940, but that figure slowly decreased during the latter half of the 20th century.

== Geography ==
Benjamin is situated at the junction of U.S. Highway 82 and State Highway 6 in central Knox County, roughly 90 miles north of Abilene, 160 miles west of Fort Worth, and 85 miles southwest of Wichita Falls.

According to the United States Census Bureau, the city has a total area of 1.0 sq mi (2.6 km^{2}), all land.

=== Climate ===
According to the Köppen climate classification, Benjamin has a semiarid climate, BSk on climate maps.

== Demographics ==
Historical population
Census	Pop.	Note	%±
1930	485		—
1940	599		23.5%
1950	530		−11.5%
1960	338		−36.2%
1970	308		−8.9%
1980	257		−16.6%
1990	225		−12.5%
2000	264		17.3%
2010	258		−2.3%
2020	196		−24.0%
U.S. Decennial Census

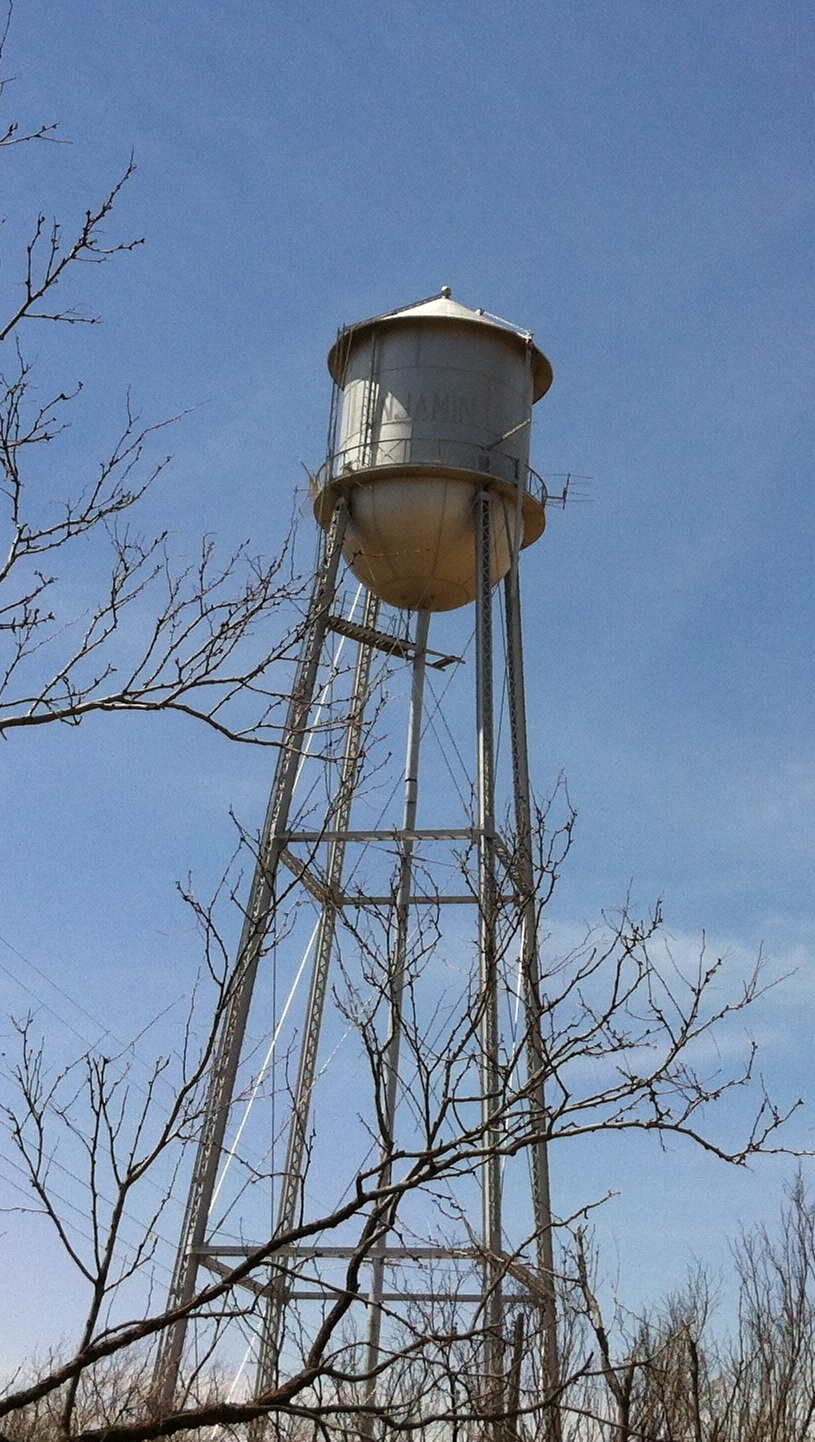
Water tower in Benjamin

=== 2020 census ===
As of the 2020 census, Benjamin had a population of 196. The median age was 44.3 years. 26.0% of residents were under the age of 18 and 23.5% of residents were 65 years of age or older. For every 100 females there were 106.3 males, and for every 100 females age 18 and over there were 98.6 males age 18 and over.

0% of residents lived in urban areas, while 100.0% lived in rural areas.

There were 75 households in Benjamin, of which 29.3% had children under the age of 18 living in them. Of all households, 66.7% were married-couple households, 9.3% were households with a male householder and no spouse or partner present, and 21.3% were households with a female householder and no spouse or partner present. About 20.0% of all households were made up of individuals and 12.0% had someone living alone who was 65 years of age or older.

There were 106 housing units, of which 29.2% were vacant. Among occupied housing units, 84.0% were owner-occupied and 16.0% were renter-occupied. The homeowner vacancy rate was <0.1% and the rental vacancy rate was 7.1%.

Racial composition as of the 2020 census
Race	Percent
White	90.3%
Black or African American	3.1%
American Indian and Alaska Native	0%
Asian	0.5%
Native Hawaiian and Other Pacific Islander	0%
Some other race	1.0%
Two or more races	5.1%
Hispanic or Latino (of any race)	15.8%

=== 2000 census ===
As of the 2000 census, 264 people, 97 households, and 64 families resided in the city. The population density was 254.5 people/sq mi (98.0/km^{2}). The 119 housing units averaged 114.7/sq mi (44.2/km^{2}). The racial makeup of the city was 89.77% White, 3.03% African American, 1.89% Asian, 4.92% from other races, and 0.38% from two or more races. Hispanics or Latinos of any race were 11.36% of the population.

Of the 97 households, 36.1% had children under 18 living with them, 48.5% were married couples living together, 14.4% had a female householder with no husband present, and 33.0% were not families; 30.9% of all households were made up of individuals, and 19.6% had someone living alone who was 65 or older. The average household size was 2.59 and the average family size was 3.31.

In the city, the age distribution was 33.3% under 18, 5.3% from 18 to 24, 25.8% from 25 to 44, 19.7% from 45 to 64, and 15.9% who were 65 or older. The median age was 38 years. For every 100 females, there were 88.6 males. For every 100 females age 18 and over, there were 85.3 males.

The median income for a household in the city was $31,023, and for a family was $38,125. Males had a median income of $29,750 versus $19,375 for females. The per capita income for the city was $13,138. About 14.5% of families and 14.2% of the population were below the poverty line, including 14.7% of those under the age of 18 and 8.7% of those 65 or over.

== Arts and culture ==
The Knox County Museum, located in the county courthouse, features a barbed wire exhibit and numerous other frontier artifacts. The Knox County Veterans Memorial, located at the corner of U.S. Highway 82 and State Highway 6, honors all Knox County veterans from the Spanish–American War through current conflicts.

Benjamin's Moorhouse Park, dedicated by the Texas Highway Department in 1965, and an area know the Narrows located four miles east of the city are also popular tourist attractions.

== Notable person ==
Texas photographer Wyman Meinzer lives in Benjamin.

== Education ==
The city of Benjamin is served by the Benjamin Independent School District and home to the Benjamin High School Mustangs.
