= Rochester =

Rochester may refer to:

== Places ==
=== Settlements ===
==== England ====
- Rochester, Kent, a town
- Rochester, Northumberland, a small village

==== United States ====
- Rochester, Illinois
- Rochester, Indiana
- Rochester Township, Cedar County, Iowa
  - Rochester, Iowa, an unincorporated community in the township
- Rochester, Kentucky
- Rochester, Massachusetts
- Rochester, Michigan
- Rochester, Minnesota
- Rochester, Missouri
- Rochester, Nevada
- Rochester, New Hampshire
- Rochester, New York, the largest city with that name.
- Rochester, Ulster County, New York
- Rochester, Ohio
- Rochester, Noble County, Ohio
- Rochester, Pennsylvania
- Rochester, Texas
- Rochester, Vermont, a town
  - Rochester (CDP), Vermont, a village in the town
- Rochester, Washington
- Rochester, Wisconsin

==== Elsewhere ====
- Rochester, Alberta, Canada
- Rochester, Victoria, Australia

=== Administrative areas ===
- Rochester (UK Parliament constituency), 1295–1918
- City of Rochester-upon-Medway, an English district, 1982–1998
- Anglican Diocese of Rochester, of the Church of England
- Episcopal Diocese of Rochester, New York, US
- Roman Catholic Diocese of Rochester, New York, US
- Roman Catholic Diocese of Winona-Rochester, Minnesota, US

=== Schools ===
- Colgate Rochester Crozer Divinity School, New York, US
- King's School, Rochester, Kent, England
- Rochester Christian University, Michigan, US
- Rochester City School District, New York, US
- Rochester Community and Technical College, Minnesota, US
- Rochester Community Schools (disambiguation)
- Rochester Grammar School, Kent, England
- Rochester High School (disambiguation)
- Rochester Institute of Technology, New York, US
- Rochester Maths, Sir Joseph Williamson's Mathematical School, founded in 1701 in Kent, England
- University Center Rochester, Minnesota, US
- University of Minnesota Rochester, Minnesota, US
- University of Rochester, New York, US

=== Other buildings and facilities ===
- Greater Rochester International Airport, New York, US
- Rochester Airport (Kent), England
- Rochester Bridge, Kent, England
- Rochester International Airport, Minnesota, US
- HM Prison Rochester, Kent, England
- Rochester Castle, Kent, England
- Rochester Cathedral, Kent, England

== People ==
- Rochester (surname)
- John Wilmot, 2nd Earl of Rochester, 17th century English poet
- Eddie "Rochester" Anderson (1904–1977), American actor
- Baron Rochester
- Earl of Rochester
- Edward Fairfax Rochester, a character in the novel Jane Eyre by Charlotte Brontë

== Ships ==
- HMS Rochester, the name of four ships of the Royal Navy
- USS Rochester, the name of three ships in the U.S. Navy

== Sport ==
- Rochester Americans or Amerks, an American Hockey League team
- Rochester Braves, a pro football (American) team in 1936 also known as the Syracuse Braves
- Rochester Express, professional softball team, 1978-1982, originally named the Rochester Zeniths
- Rochester Flash, an American Soccer League (1981-1983, 1984) and United Soccer League team
- Rochester Honkers, a Northwoods League baseball team
- Rochester Jeffersons, an original National Football League team
- Rochester Knighthawks, a National Lacrosse League team
- Rochester Lancers (1967–80), an American Soccer League (1967-1969) and North American Soccer League (1970-1980) team
- Rochester New York FC, formerly Rochester Rhinos, a soccer club
- Rochester Raiders, an indoor football team
- Rochester Rattlers, a Major League Lacrosse team
- Rochester Ravens, Women's soccer team which played from 2009 to 2013
- Rochester Red Wings, an International League baseball team
- Rochester Royals, a National Basketball Association team now known as the Sacramento Kings
- Rochester Tigers, a pro football (American) team in 1936 also known as the Brooklyn Tigers
- Rochester United F.C., a football (soccer) club
- Rochester Zeniths (basketball), a basketball team in the Continental Basketball Association (1977-1982)

== Other uses ==
- Rochester Bestiary
- Rochester Philharmonic Orchestra
- Rochester Products Division, former name of manufacturer of General Motors fuel system components (especially carburetors)
- Rochester railway station, Victoria, in Australia

== See also ==
- East Rochester (disambiguation)
- Greater Rochester (disambiguation)
- Rocester, Staffordshire, England
- Rochester and Strood, a UK Parliament constituency
- Rochester Hills, Michigan
- Rochester Sentinel (disambiguation)
- Rochester Township (disambiguation)
