= Rochester metropolitan area =

The Rochester metropolitan area may refer to:

- The Rochester metropolitan area, New York, United States
- The Rochester metropolitan area, Minnesota, United States

== See also ==
- Rochester (disambiguation)
