= Rochester Community Schools =

Rochester Community Schools or Rochester School District may refer to the following school districts in the United States:

- Rochester Community School Corporation, Rochester, Indiana
- Rochester Community Unit School District 3A, Rochester, Illinois
- Old Rochester Regional School District, Rochester, Massachusetts
- Rochester Community Schools (Michigan), Rochester Hills, Michigan
- Rochester Public Schools, Rochester, Minnesota
- Rochester School District (New Hampshire), Rochester, New Hampshire
- Rochester City School District, Rochester, New York
- Rochester Area School District, Rochester, Pennsylvania
- Rochester Independent School District, Rochester, Texas
- Rochester School District (Washington), Rochester, Washington
