= Haskell Consolidated Independent School District =

School district in Texas

Abbott Independent School District

Location
- Haskell, TX ESC Region 14 USA

District information
- Type: Public
- Grades: Pre-K through 12
- Superintendent: Wade Callaway

Students and staff
- Athletic conference: UIL Class AA
- District mascot: Indian
- Colors: Black, White, and Old Gold

Other information
- Website: www.haskell.esc14.net

Haskell Consolidated Independent School District is a public school district based in Haskell, Texas (USA).

In addition to Haskell, the district also serves the towns of Rochester and Weinert. Most of Haskell Consolidated ISD is located in Haskell County, although a very small portion of northeastern Stonewall County lies within the district.

In 2009, the school district was rated "recognized" by the Texas Education Agency.

== History ==
On July 1, 1990, Weinert Independent School District merged into Haskell ISD. The district absorbed Rochester County Line Independent School District on June 1, 2005. RISD residents attended HCISD schools starting in August 2005, and the former Rochester campus became HCISD's junior high school.

== Schools ==
- Haskell High School (Grades 9-12)
- Haskell Junior High School (Grades 6-8)
- Haskell Elementary School (Grades PK-5)
