= Rochester (surname) =

Rochester is a surname, originally a locational surname derived from the town of Rochester in Kent, England.

Notable people with the surname include:

- Ajay Rochester (born 1969), Australian actress and author
- Anna Rochester (1880–1966), American labor researcher and Communist political activist
- George Rochester (1908–2001), English physicist
- John Rochester (disambiguation), several persons
- Nathaniel Rochester (1752–1831), American Revolutionary War soldier and land speculator, founder of Rochester, New York
- Nathaniel Rochester (computer scientist) (1919–2001), designed the IBM 701, wrote the first assembler and participated in the founding of the field of artificial intelligence
- Paul Rochester (1938–2020), American football player
- Robert Rochester (c. 1494 – 1557), English Roman Catholic and employee of Queen Mary I
- Thomas H. Rochester (1797–1874), the 6th son of Colonel Nathaniel Rochester and the 6th mayor of Rochester
- William B. Rochester (1789–1838), American lawyer and politician from New York

Fictional characters:

- Edward Rochester, character in the novel Jane Eyre
