= The Last Podcast on the Left =

Dark comedy podcast

- Genre: Comedy; true crime; dark comedy; paranormal; horror
- Country of origin: United States
- Language: English

Creative team
- Created by: Marcus Parks; Ben Kissel

Cast and voices
- Hosted by: Marcus Parks; Ed Larson; Henry Zebrowski

Production
- Length: 30–150 minutes

Technical specifications
- Audio format: MP3

Publication
- No. of episodes: 1000+
- Original release: March 29, 2011
- Provider: SiriusXM
- Updates: Twice-weekly

Related
- Website: www.lastpodcastontheleft.com

The Last Podcast on the Left is a weekly podcast on the Last Podcast Network featuring podcast producer and researcher Marcus Parks, comedian and actor Henry Zebrowski, and comedian Ed Larson, three longtime friends. Episodes have explored the topics of serial killers, cults, conspiracy theories, UFO sightings, ghosts, cryptids, the occult, and readings of fan-submitted creepypastas. The name is a reference to the 1972 horror movie The Last House on the Left.

== Premise ==
Episodes explore real and imagined horror, with a typical runtime of one to two hours. The show releases two episodes weekly: a main episode and a side story episode.

Main episodes, currently hosted by Marcus Parks, Henry Zebrowski, and Ed Larson and formerly hosted by Ben Kissel, are focused on a singular topic and multiple episodes may be dedicated to one topic. Side Stories are typically hosted by Larson and Zebrowski (previously only Kissel and Zebrowski) and cover weekly true crime and other unusual news stories, with an additional “Hero of the Week” segment and often a “Listener Emails” segment. Occasionally, guests are invited onto the show for interviews, including Dan Aykroyd.

The opening theme of the podcast features a snippet from serial killer Jeffrey Dahmer who utters the line, "That's when the cannibalism started." It also includes the line and subsequent advertisement transition "Rise from your grave!" uttered by Zeus from the Sega action game Altered Beast (1988). The closing theme is Al Bowlly's "Midnight, the Stars and You", a reference to The Shining (1980).

Several repeat characters are present on the podcast (primarily voiced by Zebrowski) such as "Detective Popcorn" (the semi-erotic food-focused and incompetent police detective); Charles Ng (a notorious serial killer); "Terry the Gnome", "The Bone-Slicer"; and Minnie and Nannie Williams (victims of serial killer H. H. Holmes).

== Hosts ==
=== Marcus Parks ===
Marcus Parks
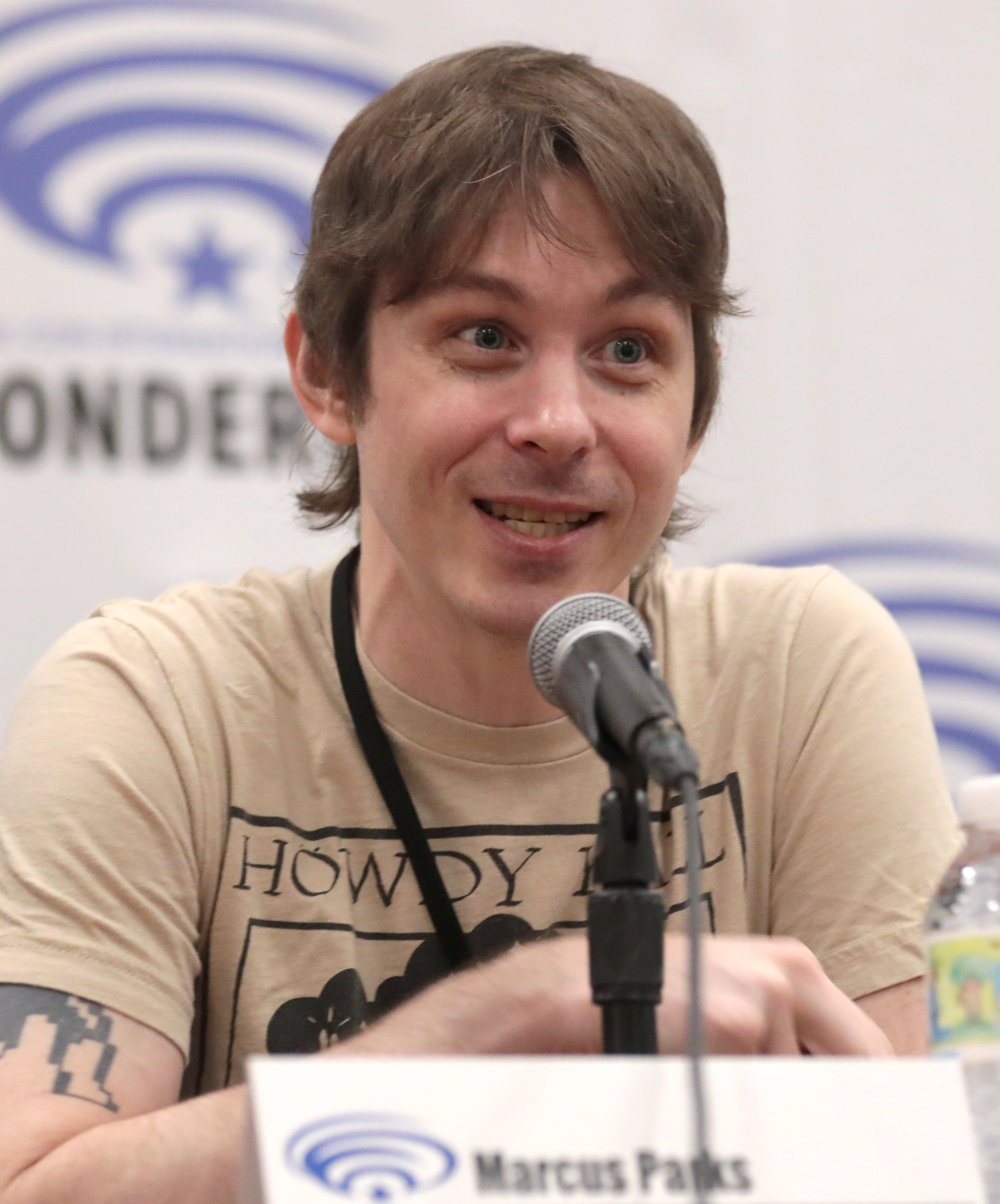
- Marcus Parks speaking at the 2023 WonderCon
- Born: January 19, 1983 (age 43); Rochester, Texas
- Occupations: Podcast host; Comedian
- Spouse: Carolina Hidalgo

Marcus Parks (born January 19, 1983) is from Rochester, Texas, graduated from Texas Tech University, where he studied English and acted as KTXT-FM's station manager for around 4 years.

Along with The Last Podcast on the Left, Parks also co-hosts the music history podcast No Dogs in Space with comedian and podcaster Carolina Hidalgo, who is also his wife.

=== Henry Zebrowski ===
Henry Zebrowski
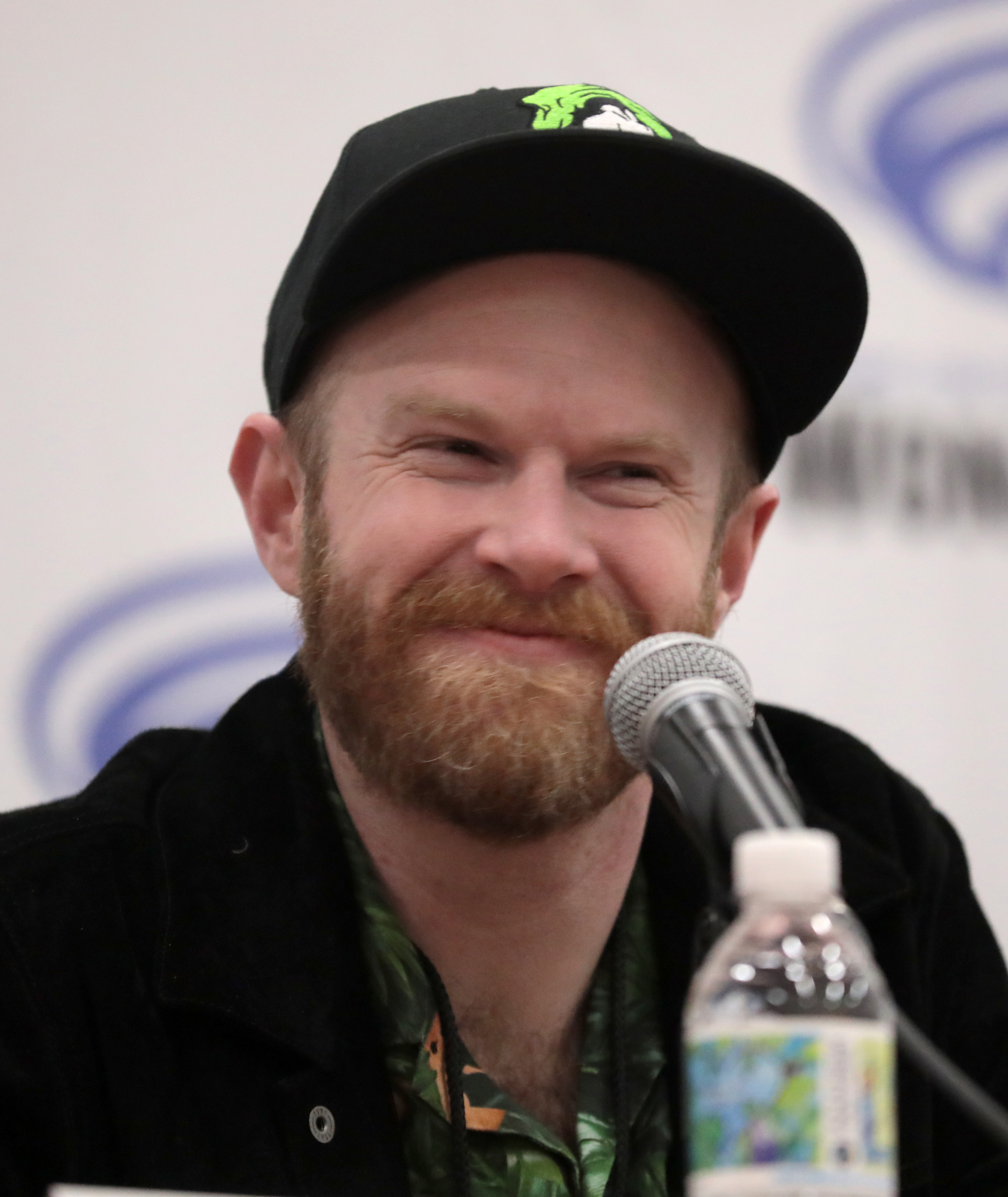
- Henry Zebrowski speaking at the 2023 WonderCon
- Born: Henry Thomas Zebrowski Jr. May 1, 1984 (age 42); Queens, New York
- Occupations: Podcast host; Comedian; Actor
- Spouse: Natalie Jean (m. 2018)

Henry Zebrowski is an American actor, podcast host, and comedian, known for his work on the Adult Swim series Your Pretty Face Is Going to Hell, the film The Wolf of Wall Street, and the NBC series Heroes Reborn.

=== Ed Larson ===
Ed Larson
- Born: Edward William Larson; October 9, 1981 (age 45); Orlando, Florida
- Occupations: Podcast host; Comedian; Actor; Writer; Producer
- Website: https://www.eddietunes.com/

Ed Larson (born October 9, 1981) is an American comedian, writer and actor. Larson was made a temporary co-host of The Last Podcast on the Left in late 2023, following Ben Kissel's departure, and eventually became a permanent co-host of the show. He was previously a member of Zebrowski's sketch comedy troupe Murderfist.

Larson also co-hosts another Last Podcast Network show called The Brighter Side with Amber Nelson, a show exploring and talking about the brighter side of a topic they choose every week.

Outside of the Last Podcast Network, he performs stand-up comedy, and has released a documentary called "How America Killed My Mother". The documentary explores how the health insurance and banking systems in the United States contributed to his mother's death.

=== Ben Kissel (formerly) ===
Ben Kissel
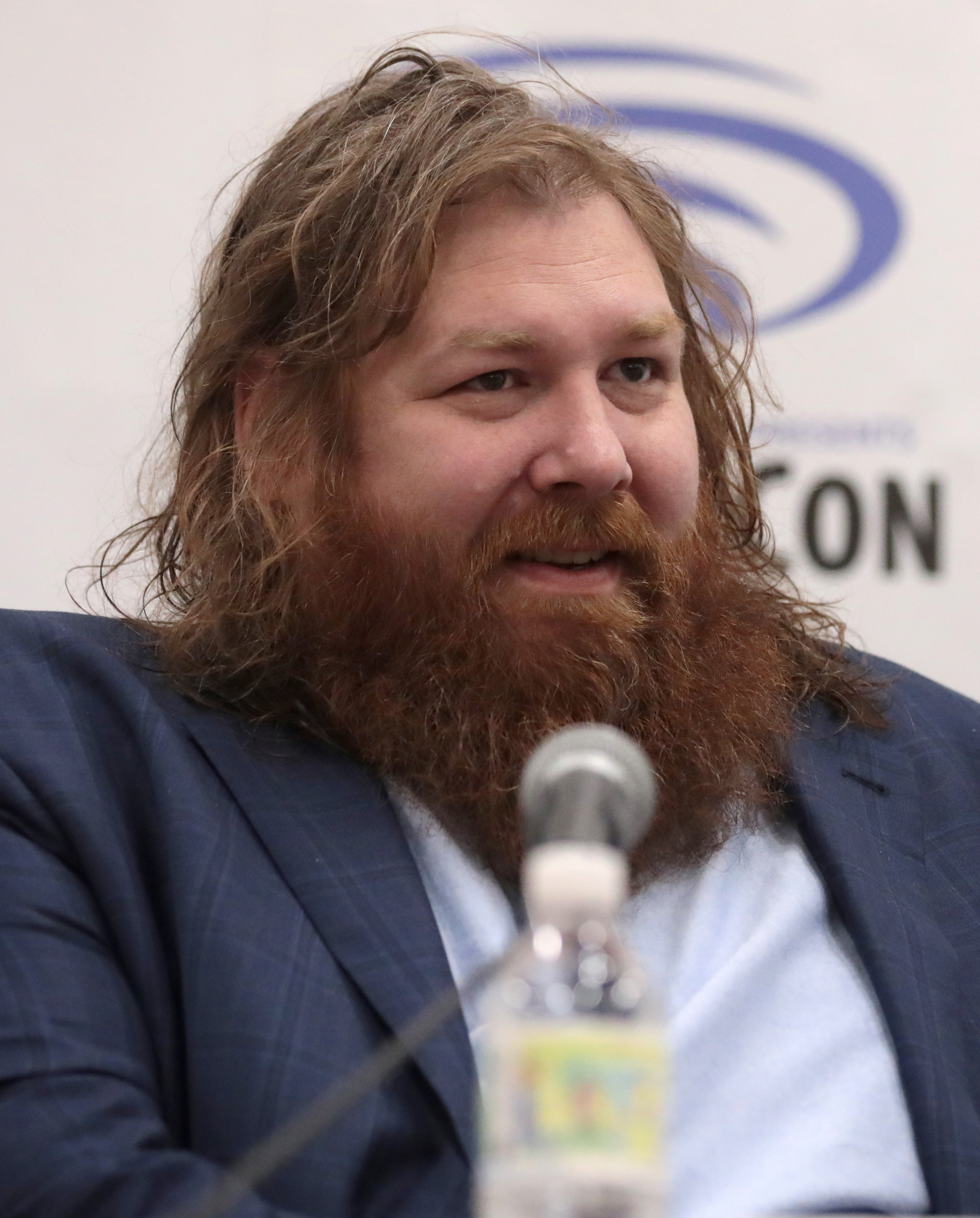
- Ben Kissel speaking at the 2023 WonderCon
- Born: July 21, 1981 (age 45); Fargo, North Dakota
- Occupation: Comedian

Ben Kissel is an American comedian and former politician. Kissel was born in Fargo, North Dakota and raised in Stevens Point, Wisconsin and attended the University of Wisconsin-Milwaukee, where he received a degree in political science.

After co-creating The Last Podcast on the Left in 2011, Kissel would continue to co-host the show until 2023. In 2017, Kissel ran for Brooklyn borough president as the candidate for the Reform Party but lost with 1.79% (6,017) of the vote. Kissel also co-hosted Abe Lincoln's Top Hat, a political podcast that ran under the Last Podcast Network.

On October 4, 2023, it was announced that Kissel would no longer be part of the podcast or the Last Podcast Network. This came following allegations of abuse. (See Co-host abuse allegations)

== History ==
Last Podcast on the Left was launched in 2011 as a conversation between friends who love horror movies. The name was inspired by the horror movie The Last House on the Left. The podcast's discussions have delved into topics including aliens, cryptids and other macabre topics.

In 2017, The Last Podcast on the Left received the People's Voice Webby in the Podcasts & Digital Audio (Comedy) category.

In 2018, they filmed their first live show at Thalia Hall in Chicago, IL. In 2019, they filmed their second live show in New Orleans, LA. The hosts have toured extensively in the US and internationally, including Iceland, Australia, and Canada for live events.

On November 19, 2019, it was announced that the show was moving exclusively to Spotify for ad-sponsored episodes. This arrangement was short-lived, ending in October 2021.

In 2020, Houghton Mifflin Harcourt released The Last Book on the Left, written by Kissel, Parks, and Zebrowski, and illustrated by Tom Neely. The book debuted at number three on the New York Times Bestseller List under Hardcover nonfiction.

On September 13, 2023, it was announced that co-host Ben Kissel would be "going into treatment" for his mental and physical health, and would not feature on the podcast until his treatment was completed. This came following accusations of abuse by a former girlfriend, though this was not explicitly stated as a contributing factor for his leave. On October 4, 2023, it was announced that Kissel would no longer be part of the podcast or the Last Podcast Network.

=== Co-host abuse allegations ===
On October 12, 2023, Rolling Stone released an article that outlined allegations against former Last Podcast on the Left co-host Ben Kissel, which included multiple alleged instances of sexual misconduct and verbal and physical abuse against women over the span of several years. The article further included testimony of former and current associates of Kissel who allege that he had issues with alcoholism, some of whom claimed that it would lead to drastic changes in his personality. Other individuals contacted by Rolling Stone went against many of the allegations, such as denying Kissel's personality would drastically change by consuming alcohol or attesting that they had never seen Kissel be abusive towards a woman or violent in any capacity.

Former acquaintances also implied that there may have been a "willful blindness" towards Kissel's alleged behaviour and alcohol abuse among The Last Podcast Network, though this was disputed by individuals close to the network. One person outlined in the article claimed that Kissel's substance abuse was a known issue in the workplace, and lengthy discussions over it had taken place over a "seven year period." They further stated that this had become enough of an issue that discussions were being made to remove Kissel from the show weeks before his eventual departure. Parks and Zebrowski are specifically named as individuals who attempted to discuss and intervene in Kissel's drinking problems. A statement was released on the Last Podcast on the Left Instagram page on October 14, in which it was claimed that they had no knowledge of the alleged abusive behavior.

In the same article, a statement written by Kissel was published, where he denied all allegations of abuse, but conceded he had been using alcohol to "cope with childhood trauma," and was in rehab to deal with his issues.

== Last Stream on the Left ==
The Last Stream on the Left is a spin-off show originally hosted on the Adult Swim website. The episodes typically consist of commentary of a selection of videos found by the hosts. After 8 seasons on Adult Swim, the Adult Swim streaming platform stopped hosting original content late in 2020. The program moved to Twitch on December 22, 2020; but the first episode was 'very quickly removed' from the network and the account banned. Subsequently, the stream was hosted on the LPOTL Patreon page, with the video uploaded to their YouTube account after the live episode airs. The live stream show aired what was intended to be its final episode on February 18, 2022, but returned once again in February 2023.

== Soul Plumber ==
Soul Plumber is a DC horror comic which includes adaptions of Last Podcast on the Left hosts Marcus Parks, Henry Zebrowski, and former host Ben Kissel. The hosts worked with artist John McCrea of DC Comics on the project. The plot follows Edgar Wiggins, a former seminary student who works at a gas station. Wiggins left seminary school in disgrace but joins a group called the Soul Plumbers out of the desire to continue saving souls. The comic is a six-issue series.

== Open Lines ==
Open Lines was a live radio talk show available exclusively on SiriusXM's Faction Talk. The show consists of listeners calling in to tell personal accounts on a previously established topic. Topics are usually related to themes covered in the podcast such as paranormal encounters, cryptozoology, and true crime. The weekly live show aired on Mondays at 7pm ET and listeners can participate by calling 855-355-4741.

== Side Stories: Excerpts ==
Side Stories: Excerpts is a short video series hosted on YouTube. As the name suggests, the videos consist of short excerpts of the full-length Patreon exclusive video. The first Side Stories video recording of their March 8, 2022, episode was uploaded on March 11, 2022. The full-length Patreon exclusive video is uploaded every Wednesday, and the 10-minute YouTube excerpt episodes are uploaded on Fridays.

== Episodes ==
No.	Title	Duration	Released
1	The First!	0:35:07	2011-03-29
2	Demonology	0:42:04	2011-04-12
3	Serial Killers	0:42:28	2011-04-20
4	Cults	0:42:54	2011-04-27
5	Sightings	0:32:45	2011-05-03
6	Nazi Party	0:34:29	2011-05-11
7	Vampires	0:27:27	2011-05-17
8	The End of the World	0:42:52	2011-05-25
9	Ghosts!	0:33:33	2011-06-07
10	Live at the Cave Comedy Radio Launch Party!	0:11:35	2011-06-15
11	Exorcisms!	0:36:01	2011-06-22
12	The Psychic Journey	0:42:39	2011-06-30
13	Chasing the Boogeyman, Part I: Son of Sam	0:46:35	2011-07-14
14	Chasing the Boogeyman, Part II: The Boogeyman Within	0:32:01	2011-07-22
15	Hoodoo Voodoo	0:34:15	2011-07-28
16	Creepypasta	0:30:41	2011-08-13
17	Ghost Hunters	0:30:54	2011-09-01
18	The Abducted	0:45:53	2011-09-28
19	Ghostbustin'	0:44:04	2011-10-04
20	Spontaneous Human Combustion	0:28:53	2011-10-18
21	The Illuminati	0:40:01	2011-11-11
22	Human Centipede 2 - The Review	0:35:46	2011-11-29
23	Real-Life Boogeymen: Child Molesters	0:34:20	2011-12-09
24	Friendly Ghosts	0:28:28	2011-12-15
25	Monsters	0:43:00	2012-01-04
26	911	0:33:14	2012-01-18
27	Torture	0:38:56	2012-01-25
28	Families are Tough	0:38:16	2012-02-01
29	Reincarnation	0:41:12	2012-03-05
30	The March Madness of Killers!	1:02:33	2012-03-21
31	Texas Executions	0:38:49	2012-03-29
32	Biological and Chemical Warfare	0:30:03	2012-04-04
33	1-800-Suicide	0:31:25	2012-04-14
34	Heaven's Gate	0:41:39	2012-04-27
35	There's Bones in the Chocolate!	0:33:56	2012-05-11
36	Sandwiches in the Matrix	0:31:17	2012-05-16
37	The Zombie Apocalypse is Upon Us	0:34:39	2012-05-30
38	Erratic Behavior	0:30:23	2012-06-06
39	Hail Satan!	0:46:18	2012-06-27
40	The Alien Agenda	0:41:35	2012-07-06
41	Our Psychic Powers	0:24:49	2012-07-11
42	Ghost, Alien, or Molested?	0:41:07	2012-07-20
43	Occult Symbols	0:37:25	2012-08-24
44	A Smattering of Creepy: Creepypasta II	0:55:19	2012-09-05
45	Demon Hunters	0:46:16	2012-09-23
46	Cannibalism	0:54:09	2012-09-30
47	Origins of the Pyramids	0:41:53	2012-10-10
48	666: The List of the Beast	0:50:56	2012-10-17
49	Haunted House Adventure	0:56:04	2012-10-25
50	50th Episode Halloween Spooky Story Extravaganza!	1:30:26	2012-10-31
51	Gucci, Dogs, and HAARP	0:52:01	2012-11-07
52	Project MK-Ultra	0:50:28	2012-11-18
53	The Toybox Killer	0:54:13	2012-11-21
54	Curses	0:47:51	2012-12-12
55	The Great Beast 666	0:52:36	2012-12-19
56	A Maximillian LeBlanc Christmas	0:04:14	2012-12-19
57	Jesus	0:45:46	2013-01-02
58	Cobra, the Light Aliens, and You!	0:43:36	2013-01-16
59	The BTK Killer, Part I: The Ball Game Explodes	0:39:57	2013-01-23
60	Serial Killer Fantasy Baseball Live	0:44:27	2013-01-26
61	The BTK Killer, Part II: Detective Popcorn	0:39:52	2013-01-30
62	Thought Form Energy Ghosts	0:44:34	2013-02-06
63	Bigfoot	0:43:46	2013-02-13
64	Bonus Material: The Jonestown Death Tape	0:54:53	2013-02-20
65	Creepypasta III: The Hamburgering	0:43:31	2013-02-24
66	The Dark World of Internet Fetish Sites	0:40:52	2013-03-06
67	Spectrophilia	0:42:45	2013-03-13
68	Satanic Ritual Abuse, Part I: A Burning In My Rectum	0:43:58	2013-03-20
69	Satanic Ritual Abuse, Part II: Old Grandma Played the Piano	0:53:06	2013-03-27
70	King of the Warlocks	0:34:20	2013-04-05
71	The American Curse	0:49:23	2013-04-20
72	Alien Implants and Abductions	0:57:38	2013-04-30
73	Ley Lines, Dolphins, and the Indigo	0:50:57	2013-05-08
74	Sex Dungeons	0:54:03	2013-05-15
75	The Afterlife	0:49:20	2013-05-22
76	Real-Life Vampires	0:49:19	2013-05-29
77	Japanese War Crimes	0:48:14	2013-06-05
78	Lord RayEl: The Messiah Has Arrived	0:50:51	2013-06-12
79	Creepypasta IV: Then Who Was Phone?	0:50:06	2013-06-19
80	The Citizen's Hearing on Disclosure	0:44:10	2013-06-26
81	Female Serial Killers	1:04:21	2013-07-03
82	Secret Societies	1:04:40	2013-07-10
83	Unsolved Serial Murders, Part I: The Phantom, the Axe, and the Torso	0:33:15	2013-07-17
84	Unsolved Serial Murders, Part II: The Zodiac	1:15:43	2013-07-24
85	Witches: A History and Demonstration of Their Power	0:52:42	2013-07-31
86	Spree Killers, Part I: If They Knew How Much Fun I Was Havin'...	1:08:16	2013-08-07
87	Spree Killers, Part II: I've Been Getting These Headaches...	0:59:43	2013-08-14
88	The Vile Vortices	0:55:41	2013-08-21
89	Open Lines	1:08:02	2013-08-28
90	The Pleiadians and the Battle for Humanity	0:47:24	2013-09-04
91	Black Serial Killers, Part I: Call Me God	0:52:27	2013-09-11
92	Black Serial Killers, Part II: The Zebra Murders	0:49:17	2013-09-16
93	Gnomes!	0:53:22	2013-09-25
94	Creepypasta V: Babybum	0:50:29	2013-10-02
95	Listenerpasta	1:11:56	2013-10-09
96	Call 911!	1:05:23	2013-10-16
97	Movies of the Beast	1:05:45	2013-10-23
98	Hostage to the Devil	1:05:56	2013-10-30
99	Bundy	0:59:13	2013-11-06
100	Bundy II: Bones for Time	1:02:35	2013-11-13
101	Hate Week	0:44:20	2013-11-20
102	Serial Killers of WWII	1:09:52	2013-11-27
103	Creepypasta VI: The Repercussions of Evil	0:53:42	2013-12-04
104	Journey to the Planet Serpo	0:48:35	2013-12-11
105	John Wayne Gacy	1:06:05	2013-12-19
106	John Wayne Gacy II: Maybe He Didn't Do It	1:11:01	2014-01-01
107	Haunted Battlegrounds of The American Civil War	1:00:19	2014-01-08
108	Urban Legends	1:06:27	2014-01-15
109	Regional Monsters II: A Hint of Mucus	0:56:12	2014-01-22
110	Richard Ramirez, Part I: The Night Stalker	0:57:48	2014-01-29
111	Richard Ramirez, Part II: Wet Leather	1:05:07	2014-02-05
112	Gangstalking	0:50:28	2014-02-19
113	Henry's New Orleans Adventure	0:27:10	2014-02-26
114	The Bridgewater Triangle	1:02:01	2014-03-05
115	Creepypasta VII: The High Price We Pay at the Pump	0:45:16	2014-03-12
116	Gary Ridgway	0:55:17	2014-03-19
117	The Sensitive Monsters	1:03:08	2014-03-26
118	The Satanic Government, Part I: Hellfire	1:00:45	2014-04-02
119	The Satanic Government, Part II: The Franklin Cover-Up, Part I	0:59:39	2014-04-09
120	The Satanic Government, Part III: The Franklin Cover-Up, Part II	0:55:05	2014-04-21
121	Remote Viewing	0:53:28	2014-04-23
122	Dahmer, Part I: Infinityland	0:59:53	2014-04-30
123	Dahmer, Part II: How to Be Left Alone in the Ghetto	1:11:12	2014-05-07
124	Dahmer, Part III: Paint It White	1:04:52	2014-05-14
125	Archons, Seres, and the Secret Fates of All Mankind	1:01:12	2014-05-21
126	Haunted Hollywood	0:57:45	2014-05-28
127	Werewolves, Part I: God's Werewolf	0:54:25	2014-06-04
128	Werewolves, Part II: Eat the Boy	0:49:26	2014-06-11
129	O. J. Simpson	1:04:28	2014-06-18
130	Creepypasta VIII: Leg of a Horse	0:53:18	2014-06-25
131	Australian Serial Killers, Part I: Big Bradley	0:53:37	2014-07-02
132	Australian Serial Killers, Part II: Essie Made Me Do It	1:01:28	2014-07-08
133	Waco	1:27:18	2014-07-23
134	Alien-Human Hybrids	1:03:20	2014-07-30
135	Ted Kaczynski, Part I: I Will Have My Revenge!	1:01:06	2014-08-06
136	Ted Kaczynski, Part II: Eat Your Cake and Have It Too	1:14:02	2014-08-14
137	Astrology	1:09:33	2014-08-20
138	Henry's True Crime Los Angeles Adventure	0:44:30	2014-08-28
139	Edgewood, Part I: The Colonel's Pink Cadillac	1:03:57	2014-09-03
140	Edgewood, Part II: Disco Soup	1:00:32	2014-09-10
141	Andrei Chikatilo, Part I: Soviet Moods	1:10:25	2014-09-17
142	Andrei Chikatilo, Part II: Andrei's Big Day Out	1:21:30	2014-09-25
143	The Worst Ways to Die	1:09:08	2014-10-01
144	Halloween Breakdown	1:08:01	2014-10-08
145	Listenerpasta II: Brain Worms	1:15:09	2014-10-15
146	Creepypasta IX: Gjoberdik	1:06:13	2014-10-22
147	Charles Manson, Part I: An Incarcerated Life	1:15:24	2014-10-30
148	Charles Manson, Part II: The Turning of the Worm	1:19:09	2014-11-05
149	Charles Manson, Part III: The Devil's Work	1:31:49	2014-11-13
150	Monsters of the American Indian	1:12:07	2014-11-19
151	Horrors of the UK	1:13:56	2014-11-26
152	The Dylatov Pass Incident [sic]	1:04:01	2014-12-04
153	Fred & Rosemary West	1:13:40	2014-12-10
154	The Dark Side of Santa Claus	1:03:56	2014-12-19
155	2014: The Year in Murder and Mayhem	1:19:23	2014-12-31
156	The Coronado Group Abduction	1:03:38	2015-01-07
157	Nazis and the Occult, Part I: Severe and Annoying	1:07:58	2015-01-14
158	Nazis and the Occult, Part II: White People Nerds	1:07:55	2015-01-21
159	The Boston Strangler Murders, Part I: A Paranoia of Mother-Hate	1:21:01	2015-01-28
160	The Boston Strangler Murders, Part II: Shoes in the Shower	1:15:24	2015-02-04
161	Hollow Moon	1:12:31	2015-02-11
162	Axe Murderers, Part I: Horse Owner and Horse	0:52:43	2015-02-18
163	Axe Murderers, Part II: Pinning Butterflies	0:58:08	2015-02-25
164	Playing with the Dead	1:21:13	2015-03-04
165	Ed Kemper, Part I: A Bit of a Bumblebutt	1:00:27	2015-03-11
166	Ed Kemper, Part II: Momendorf	1:11:48	2015-03-18
167	JonBenét Ramsey, Part I: And Hence	1:01:08	2015-03-25
168	JonBenét Ramsey, Part II: The Last Bulb on the Christmas Tree	1:05:04	2015-04-01
169	The Betty & Barney Hill Abduction, Part I: Concentric Circles	0:59:34	2015-04-08
170	Betty & Barney Hill, Part II: Don't Think I Can't Take It	1:06:06	2015-04-15
171	Serial Killers of the American Frontier	1:15:07	2015-04-22
172	Ed Gein, Part I: Oddball	1:07:03	2015-04-30
173	Ed Gein, Part II: A Living Rainbow	0:59:21	2015-05-06
174	Ed Gein, Part III: Salted and Treated	1:09:35	2015-05-13
175	Amityville, Part I: The Story	0:56:56	2015-05-21
176	Amityville, Part II: The Truth	0:52:33	2015-05-27
177	Mysterious Sounds and Recordings	1:18:32	2015-06-04
178	Columbine, Part I: The Myth	1:06:42	2015-06-10
179	Columbine, Part II: Creations, Exploitations, and Cover-Ups	1:13:25	2015-06-17
180	An Interview with Laurence R. Harvey	0:26:32	2015-06-22
181	Creepypasta X: Thumbers	1:08:10	2015-07-02
182	Henry Lee Lucas, Part I: From the Womb of a Whore	1:08:20	2015-07-08
183	Henry Lee Lucas, Part II: Highway Star	1:20:27	2015-07-16
184	Henry Lee Lucas, Part III: The Hand of Death	1:05:48	2015-07-23
185	Henry Lee Lucas, Part IV: I Belong To The Devil	1:07:43	2015-07-29
186	Fairies	1:00:30	2015-08-05
187	The Dulce Facility, Part I: Pronounced Kkhhah-sshh-fahsh-sst	1:20:30	2015-08-12
188	The Dulce Facility, Part II: Serious Business Mode	0:53:33	2015-08-19
189	9/11, Part I: The Day	1:40:04	2015-08-29
190	9/11, Part II: The Conspiracy	1:44:20	2015-09-03
191	9/11, Part III: Six Degrees of Baphomet	1:11:14	2015-09-11
192	Hollow Earth	1:19:04	2015-09-17
193	Son of Sam, Part I: Kill For My Master	1:07:04	2015-09-23
194	Son of Sam, Part II: The Wicked King of Wicker	1:10:19	2015-09-30
195	Listenerpasta III: He's So Cold	0:54:35	2015-10-07
196	Listener Stories II: You Do It	1:39:09	2015-10-15
197	The Magick Series, Part I: The Right Hand Path	1:44:04	2015-10-23
198	Halloween	0:50:22	2015-10-30
199	The Magick Series, Part II: The Left Hand Path	1:16:01	2015-11-04
200	H.H. Holmes, Part I: The Horrid Meat	1:10:04	2015-11-10
201	H.H. Holmes, Part II: Nothing But Trouble	1:05:33	2015-11-19
202	H.H. Holmes, Part III: Professional Uncle	1:11:55	2015-11-26
203	Leonard Lake & Charles Ng, Part I: Operation Brownie Pockets	1:04:22	2015-12-03
204	Leonard Lake & Charles Ng, Part II: What I Bring To Friendship	0:58:30	2015-12-11
205	The Detective Popcorn Christmas Special	0:19:35	2015-12-21
206	Leonard Lake & Charles Ng, Part III: Jocular-Type Talk	0:57:31	2015-12-31
207	Leonard Lake & Charles Ng, Part IV: Roughly Ten Cats	1:01:24	2016-01-06
208	David Bowie and the Occult	1:19:30	2016-01-18
209	Ghost Cats of the South	0:51:11	2016-01-20
210	Dean Corll, Part I: The Pouting Room	0:59:50	2016-02-05
211	Dean Corll, Part II: The Ready Sled	1:00:30	2016-02-10
212	Dean Corll, Part III: 18 Inch Double	0:58:39	2016-02-25
213	Dean Corll, Part IV: A Country Boondoggle	1:06:46	2016-02-26
214	Chemtrails	1:02:21	2016-03-02
215	Paranormal Photography	0:58:48	2016-03-10
216	Roswell	1:19:26	2016-03-18
217	Roswell II: It's a Balloon!	1:03:29	2016-03-23
218	The Aum Shinrikyo Death Cult, Part I: Mountain Wizards	1:13:40	2016-04-01
219	The Aum Shinrikyo Death Cult, Part II: The Bitter Cookie	1:01:59	2016-04-07
220	The Aum Shinrikyo Death Cult, Part III: The Soldiers of White Love	1:23:03	2016-04-13
221	The Aum Shinrikyo Death Cult, Part IV: A Billionaire's Testicles	1:07:24	2016-04-23
222	Manifestos	1:31:43	2016-04-28
223	Witch Hunts	1:10:40	2016-05-06
224	Creepypasta XI: Lemon Clams	0:53:17	2016-05-19
225	The Hillside Stranglers, Part I: The Buzzard	1:10:44	2016-05-26
226	The Hillside Stranglers, Part II: Airplane School	1:03:44	2016-06-02
227	The Hillside Stranglers, Part III: You Can Call Me Steve	0:59:09	2016-06-10
228	Sexy Ghosts	1:02:33	2016-06-16
229	Henry Yells at Dave Willis About Aliens	0:38:39	2016-06-29
230	Chaos Magic, Part I: The Basics	0:51:18	2016-07-01
231	Chaos Magic, Part II: The Discipline	0:52:11	2016-07-06
232	Bigfoot Hunters	1:07:58	2016-07-13
233	The Secret Space Program	1:10:43	2016-07-22
234	Albert Fish, Part I: You Asked For This	1:25:40	2016-08-03
235	Albert Fish, Part II: That's How They Do It In Hollywood	1:04:17	2016-08-10
236	Albert Fish, Part III: The Werewolf of Wysteria	1:16:07	2016-08-17
237	The Menendez Brothers, Part I: A Castro Or a Bega	1:03:14	2016-08-24
238	The Menendez Brothers, Part II: White Trash With Money	1:22:09	2016-08-31
239	Billy Meier – Alien Collaborator	1:12:34	2016-09-07
240	The Black Monk of Pontefract	1:04:34	2016-09-14
241	Serial Killers and the Women Who Love Them	1:18:36	2016-09-24
242	Time Travelers	1:13:31	2016-10-13
243	Listener Stories III: War Edition	1:28:09	2016-10-20
244	Listenerpasta IV: Jeff	1:07:04	2016-10-27
245	Richard Chase, Part I: The Cat Tree	1:03:53	2016-10-27
246	Richard Chase, Part II: Mrs. Dracula	1:12:28	2016-11-02
247	The Lobster-Boy Murders	1:08:50	2016-11-11
248	Children of God, Part I: Mother's Peanut Butter	1:12:13	2016-11-21
249	Children of God, Part II: Dad Was a Sexy Guy	1:16:26	2016-12-02
250	Children of God, Part III: Flesh Daddy	1:07:35	2016-12-09
***	A Conversation with 'My Favorite Murder'	0:53:33	2016-12-14
251	Children of God, Part IV: Ricky	1:17:12	2016-12-16
252	The Gulf Breeze Sightings, Part I: Ammonia and Cinnamon	1:00:23	2016-12-30
253	The Gulf Breeze Sightings, Part II: Gary, Don, and Bob	1:15:58	2017-01-04
254	Jack the Ripper, Part I: Cockney Yoga	0:54:09	2017-01-13
255	Jack The Ripper, Part II: Anything But Your Prayers	1:02:04	2017-01-19
256	Jack The Ripper, Part III: Oh Murder!	0:54:38	2017-01-26
257	Jack The Ripper, Part IV: The Suspects, Part I	1:01:01	2017-02-03
258	Jack The Ripper, Part V: The Suspects, Part II	1:23:24	2017-02-10
259	The Puerto Rican Chupacabra	1:24:38	2017-02-16
260	LPOTL - Live In Chicago!	1:14:38	2017-02-23
261	L. Ron Hubbard, Part I: Grub Hubbard	1:36:48	2017-03-09
262	L. Ron Hubbard, Part II: Dianetics	1:32:16	2017-03-15
263	L. Ron Hubbard, Part III: Scientology Begins	1:47:01	2017-03-23
264	L. Ron Hubbard, Part IV: Sea Org	1:42:10	2017-03-31
265	Chris Benoit	1:36:49	2017-04-07
266	Aileen Wuornos, Part I: Yosemite Samantha	1:33:29	2017-04-14
267	Aileen Wuornos, Part II: Dr. Legal	1:48:41	2017-04-19
268	The Philadelphia Experiment	1:32:45	2017-05-03
269	Kurt Cobain, Part I: Albini's Weenies	1:08:11	2017-05-08
270	Kurt Cobain, Part II: The Ghost Train of El Duce	1:00:12	2017-05-10
271	Carl Panzram, Part I: A Bit of a Grouch	1:05:55	2017-05-19
272	Carl Panzram, Part II: The Akista	1:00:54	2017-05-25
273	Carl Panzram, Part III: Yacht Club	1:10:25	2017-06-02
274	The Oklahoma City Bombing, Part I: The Day	1:17:08	2017-06-19
275	The Oklahoma City Bombing, Part II: Noodle McVeigh	1:37:35	2017-06-27
276	The Oklahoma City Bombing, Part III: Follow the Guillotines	1:22:17	2017-07-13
277	The Oklahoma City Bombing, Part IV: The Big Rub	1:09:06	2017-07-14
278	Creepypasta XII: U-Turn to Madness	1:02:10	2017-07-21
279	The Enfield Poltergeist, Part I: Oh Crumbs!	1:17:23	2017-07-28
280	The Enfield Poltergeist, Part II: Poopergeist	1:25:47	2017-08-04
281	Jerry Brudos, Part I: Dump Fever	1:36:47	2017-08-18
282	Jerry Brudos, Part II: Coke and Conversation	1:16:43	2017-08-21
283	Sexy Ghosts II: 20 Cock Lane	1:12:33	2017-08-24
284	Fire In The Sky – The Travis Walton Abduction	1:34:55	2017-09-02
285	Norwegian Black Metal, Part I: Chainsaw Gutsfuck	1:30:51	2017-09-11
286	Norwegian Black Metal, Part II: Orc Urinal	1:01:00	2017-09-15
287	Norwegian Black Metal, Part III: This Laughable Society	1:14:07	2017-09-21
288	Robert Pickton, Part I: Pig Sense	1:24:12	2017-09-30
289	Robert Pickton, Part II: La Costra Pigsta	1:24:59	2017-10-06
290	Robert Pickton, Part III: Mrs. Pickton	1:02:10	2017-10-13
291	Robert Pickton, Part IV: Out to Lunch	1:22:05	2017-10-20
292	Listenerpasta V: Babyface	1:12:50	2017-10-28
293	Bill Cooper, Part I: The Granddaddy of Conspiracy	1:20:05	2017-11-03
294	Bill Cooper, Part II: The Secret Government	1:25:59	2017-11-11
295	Black Widows, Part I: The Polish Prognosticator	1:02:41	2017-11-18
296	Black Widows, Part II: Hit and Run Helen	0:55:32	2017-11-24
297	The Lost Continent of Lemuria	1:10:27	2017-12-02
298	Pee Wee Gaskins, Part I: See Ya Monday	1:14:24	2017-12-09
299	Pee Wee Gaskins, Part II: The Chicken's Tongue	1:07:38	2017-12-15
299.5	Pee Wee Gaskins, Part III: Tell That to Aunt Monkey	1:02:03	2017-12-30
299.75	Pee Wee Gaskins, Part IV: The Final Truth	1:06:25	2018-01-06
300	The 300th Episode! Jonestown, Part I: Everyone in the World Is My Friend	1:46:14	2018-01-12
***	Minisode: The Thames Torso Murders	0:30:05	2018-01-17
301	Jonestown, Part II: Sidestep and Bullshit	1:53:54	2018-01-19
302	Jonestown, Part III: Check Please	2:00:04	2018-01-26
303	Jonestown, Part IV: The Box	1:50:21	2018-02-02
304	Jonestown, Part V: The Last Year	2:10:23	2018-02-09
***	"His Master's Voice", Read by Marcus Parks	0:49:06	2018-02-17
305	The Hudson Valley Sightings	2:02:52	2018-02-23
306	Casey Anthony, Part I: Ill Wishers	1:59:40	2018-03-03
307	Casey Anthony, Part II: The Dancing Belvins	1:27:48	2018-03-09
308	Robert Hansen, Part I: Gun Nerd	1:34:34	2018-03-17
309	Robert Hansen, Part II: Gross Truncations	1:23:45	2018-03-23
310	Rasputin, Part I: Greg Drunk	1:17:59	2018-03-30
311	Rasputin, Part II: Agrarian	1:30:37	2018-04-07
312	Rasputin, Part III: The Rise of Rasputin	1:14:08	2018-04-14
***	Side Stories: RIP Art Bell	0:30:58	2018-04-19
313	Rasputin, Part IV: The Fall of Rasputin	1:33:32	2018-04-21
***	Side Stories: NXIVM	0:43:45	2018-04-25
314	The Jersey Devil	1:13:07	2018-04-28
***	Side Stories: EARONS & Incels	0:53:13	2018-05-03
315	The Assassination of John Lennon, Part I	1:24:18	2018-05-05
***	Side Stories: Bruce McArthur	0:35:29	2018-05-09
316	The Assassination of John Lennon, Part II	1:49:28	2018-05-12
***	Side Stories: QAnon	0:38:34	2018-05-16
317	Dennis Nilsen, Part I: Orientation in Me	1:36:11	2018-05-19
***	Side Stories: The Corrections	0:45:53	2018-05-24
318	Dennis Nilsen, Part II: A Thin Strand of Humanity	1:29:13	2018-05-26
319	Creepypasta XIII: A Meat's Dream	1:21:52	2018-06-02
***	Side Stories: Killdozer and the Cavitations	0:38:31	2018-06-08
320	Biggie & Tupac, Part I: Sugar Bear	1:44:32	2018-06-09
***	Side Stories: Foot Taco	0:40:17	2018-06-15
321	Biggie & Tupac, Part II: Scuttled	1:05:11	2018-06-16
***	Side Stories: Hereditary	0:36:09	2018-06-21
322	Biggie & Tupac, Part III: The Murders	1:11:31	2018-06-23
***	Side Stories: Do AI-Powered Coffee Machines Have Wet Dreams?	0:36:24	2018-06-28
323	The Men in Black, Part I: You Fed the Tulpa	1:16:44	2018-06-30
***	Side Stories: RIP Bush's Baked Beans Dog	0:35:45	2018-07-04
324	The Men in Black, Part II: Pig Transport	1:16:12	2018-07-06
325	Men in Black, Part III: Time Crime	1:15:56	2018-07-14
***	Side Stories: Bigfoot Serves the Devil	0:43:46	2018-07-26
***	Side Stories: Make Mud, Not War	0:39:20	2018-08-02
326	Richard Kuklinski, Part I: Origins of the Iceman	1:40:09	2018-08-04
***	Side Stories: The Beautiful Writer Who Killed	0:42:35	2018-08-08
327	Richard Kuklinski, Part II: Tales of the Iceman	1:44:22	2018-08-11
***	Side Stories: Lady of the Dunes	0:48:22	2018-08-16
328	Richard Kuklinski, Part III: The Fall of the Iceman	2:03:36	2018-08-17
***	Side Stories: Kuklinski vs. Panzram	0:44:39	2018-08-23
329	Katherine Knight, Part I: Lady Leatherface	1:18:49	2018-08-25
***	Side Stories: Every Horror Movie Is My Child	0:56:23	2018-08-29
330	Katherine Knight, Part II: Bangaroo	1:22:29	2018-08-31
***	Side Stories: Notorious B.T.K.	0:48:58	2018-09-06
331	The Donner Party, Part I: Salt of the Earth	1:25:01	2018-09-08
***	Side Stories: Joe Exotic 2020	0:49:29	2018-09-12
332	The Donner Party, Part II: The Forlorn Hope	1:45:32	2018-09-14
***	Side Stories: Hybrid Armies & Little Green Men	0:47:13	2018-09-20
333	The Andreasson Affair	1:19:10	2018-09-22
***	Side Stories: Grandpa Died Twice	0:47:19	2018-09-26
334	Flat Earth	1:14:58	2018-09-29
***	Side Stories: Sovereign Citizens	0:48:32	2018-10-04
335	The West Memphis Three, Part I: The Road to Hell	1:56:28	2018-10-06
***	Side Stories: Drunk Birds	0:53:28	2018-10-11
336	The West Memphis Three, Part II: The Confession of Jessie Misskelley	1:50:40	2018-10-12
***	Side Stories: Stargate	0:59:07	2018-10-18
337	The West Memphis Three, Part III: The Trials	2:02:34	2018-10-20
***	Side Stories: Listenerpasta VI: The Shape of Water, Barley, and Hops	1:22:30	2018-10-25
338	Murderous Possession: The Story of Michael Taylor	1:42:38	2018-10-27
***	Side Stories: Every Horror Movie Is My Child 2	0:57:52	2018-10-31
339	Peter Kürten, Part I: Papa Denke	1:28:39	2018-11-03
***	Side Stories: Oumuamua	0:59:50	2018-11-08
340	Peter Kurten, Part II: Dr Chuckles	1:12:22	2018-11-10
***	Side Stories: Noodles & Beef	0:59:10	2018-11-15
341	The Order of the Solar Temple, Part I: The Beginning	1:29:35	2018-11-17
***	Side Stories: Threatin'	1:00:34	2018-11-22
***	Side Stories: Tiger Beat	0:43:59	2018-11-29
342	The Order of the Solar Temple, Part II: The Rise and Fall of the Order	1:49:43	2018-12-01
***	Side Stories: John Chau's Impossible Mission	0:47:47	2018-12-05
343	The Order of the Solar Temple, Part III: December 4, 1994	1:25:23	2018-12-10
***	Side Stories: Russia's Werewolf Killer	1:05:12	2018-12-13
344	The Book of Revelation	1:52:25	2018-12-15
***	Side Stories: Grease Trap	1:00:53	2018-12-20
345	Hangmen and Headsmen	1:40:35	2018-12-22
***	Side Stories: Cannibal Corpse Rapture	0:49:23	2019-01-02
346	Mark Twitchell, Part I: Favorite Duck of the Month	1:28:25	2019-01-05
***	Side Stories: Hot Tub Conspiracy	1:05:35	2019-01-10
347	Mark Twitchell, Part II: Some Kinda Ketchup Party	1:36:03	2019-01-12
***	Side Stories: Noisy Crickets	0:55:16	2019-01-16
348	Josef Mengele, Part I: The Rise of Eugenics	1:39:20	2019-01-18
***	Side Stories: KB	0:44:13	2019-01-23
349	Josef Mengele, Part II: The Crimes of Mengele	2:06:34	2019-01-27
***	Side Stories: The Ted Bundy Tapes	1:11:10	2019-01-30
350	Josef Mengele, Part III: The Hunt	2:24:56	2019-02-03
***	Side Stories: Metal Health	0:48:37	2019-02-06
351	Ouija	1:42:25	2019-02-09
***	Side Stories: Human Dolls	0:52:16	2019-02-13
352	Skinwalker Ranch, Part I: The Utah Flap	1:37:54	2019-02-16
***	Side Stories: Do Attend	1:09:21	2019-02-20
353	Skinwalker Ranch, Part II: Tales of the Gormans	1:34:38	2019-02-23
***	Side Stories: Sword Fight on Stardust Ranch	0:56:28	2019-02-27
354	Skinwalker Ranch, Part III: The Investigation	1:37:22	2019-03-01
***	Side Stories: Marty the Robot	0:59:13	2019-03-06
355	Leaving Neverland	1:07:51	2019-03-08
***	Side Stories: Momo's Bizarre Adventure	0:51:31	2019-03-14
356	Joseph Kallinger, Part I: The Shoemaker	1:40:01	2019-03-15
***	Side Stories: The Ripper's Rag	0:59:52	2019-03-21
357	Joseph Kallinger, Part II: The Perfect Waiter	1:55:16	2019-03-23
***	Side Stories: Joe Bob Briggs	1:07:21	2019-03-28
358	The Electric Chair	1:28:07	2019-03-30
***	Side Stories: Fakes Among Us	0:55:02	2019-04-03
359	Illuminati Update	1:11:26	2019-04-05
***	Side Stories: Wooden Bong	0:55:22	2019-04-10
360	The Devils of Loudun, Part I: Dr Silly	1:19:27	2019-04-12
***	Side Stories: Hangry	0:59:42	2019-04-17
361	The Devils of Loudun, Part II: And That's a Promise	1:47:52	2019-04-20
***	Side Stories: Pig Brains	1:12:08	2019-04-23
362	Israel Keyes, Part I: The Nu Metal Serial Killer	1:23:08	2019-04-27
***	Side Stories: I Saw The Sign	0:59:45	2019-05-01
363	Icelandic Sorcery	1:16:38	2019-05-03
***	Side Stories: Extremely Wicked, Shockingly Cute	0:59:36	2019-05-08
364	Israel Keyes, Part II: Mama Bones' Vodon Hamburger Bar	1:20:31	2019-05-11
***	Side Stories: Sky Penis	1:03:15	2019-05-16
365	Psychic Vampires	1:22:15	2019-05-17
***	Side Stories: Good Karma	0:58:39	2019-05-23
366	The Rendlesham Forest Incident, Part I: I'm the Alien	1:31:25	2019-05-25
***	Side Stories: Grasping At Straws	0:48:13	2019-05-30
367	Ed Savitz / Joe Meek	1:26:18	2019-06-01
***	Side Stories: Yandere Stabbing	0:57:23	2019-06-05
368	The Rendlesham Forest Incident, Part II: Uncle Larry's 42nd Birthday	1:35:26	2019-06-07
***	Side Stories: The Bigfoot Files	0:47:16	2019-06-12
369	Bonnie & Clyde, Part I: Once You Go Short...	1:56:19	2019-06-14
***	Side Stories: Dan Aykroyd	0:52:48	2019-06-19
370	Bonnie & Clyde, Part II: Give Me The Money Now!	2:13:34	2019-06-21
371	Bonnie & Clyde, Part III: Filthy, Smelly, and Surly	2:07:19	2019-06-28
***	Side Stories: Extraterrestrial Terrorists	0:59:09	2019-07-03
372	Adelaide, City of Evil	0:57:43	2019-07-05
***	Side Stories: Leverage	0:46:19	2019-07-10
373	Creepypasta XIV: Oh Yeah I Like This	1:23:27	2019-07-12
***	Side Stories: Bianca Devins / Weaponized Ticks	0:58:04	2019-07-17
374	Belle Gunness, Part I: Holes in the Hog Pit	1:39:03	2019-07-19
***	Side Stories: Eat Sugar	0:54:12	2019-07-24
375	Belle Gunness, Part II: I Love Being a Farmhand	1:39:30	2019-07-26
***	Side Stories: Boomer Secrets	0:55:59	2019-07-31
376	Joe Palczynski / The Bloody Benders	1:10:29	2019-08-02
***	Side Stories: The New Bohemian Grove	0:59:06	2019-08-07
377	Howard Unruh	1:34:36	2019-08-09
***	Side Stories: Epstein	0:51:23	2019-08-14
378	Mormonism, Part I: When You're Here You're Family	1:46:32	2019-08-17
***	Side Stories: A Break From Reality	0:54:19	2019-08-21
379	Mormonism, Part II: I'm in the Bible Now	1:40:57	2019-08-24
***	Side Stories: Chick-fil-Assault	0:53:59	2019-08-29
380	Mormonism, Part III: The Level of Leakage	2:01:43	2019-08-31
***	Side Stories: Haunted Hooters	0:59:51	2019-09-04
381	Burke and Hare	1:09:29	2019-09-06
***	Side Stories: JonBenét Was My Friend	0:50:39	2019-09-11
382	Mormonism, Part IV: I Invented This Scam	2:19:27	2019-09-14
***	Side Stories: Jinmenken Me Crazy	0:43:18	2019-09-18
383	Q&A	1:24:21	2019-09-20
***	Side Stories: Orphan	1:00:53	2019-09-26
384	Mormonism, Part V: King of Beaver Island!	2:15:38	2019-09-27
***	Side Stories: Alien Shot in the Pine Barrens	0:52:58	2019-10-03
385	Mormonism, Part VI: X-Men Cult Edition	2:45:43	2019-10-05
***	Minisode: Zombieland: Double Tap	0:34:31	2019-10-07
***	Side Stories: Phantom Clowns and Cattle Mutilation	0:57:49	2019-10-10
386	The Most Haunted House in England, Part I: The BGEC Boys	1:21:43	2019-10-11
***	Side Stories: Blast From The Past	0:56:16	2019-10-16
387	The Most Haunted House in England, Part II: Dirty Ding	1:36:03	2019-10-18
***	Side Stories: A Particular Shade of Red	1:13:07	2019-10-23
388	The Vampire Hunters of Highgate Cemetery	1:48:31	2019-10-26
***	Minisode: Doctor Sleep	0:36:13	2019-10-28
***	Side Stories: The Curtain People	1:26:33	2019-10-31
389	Hadden Clark, Part I: Mommy's Basement Bakery	1:25:49	2019-11-02
***	Side Stories: Visitations w/ Elijah Wood & Daniel Noah	0:57:16	2019-11-06
390	Hadden Clark, Part II: Women's Panties	1:20:58	2019-11-08
***	Side Stories: Vultures	1:02:24	2019-11-13
391	Relaxed Fit: The Finders	1:09:30	2019-11-15
***	Side Stories: Fake Baby	1:02:10	2019-11-20
392	Sexual Liaisons with the Alien	1:42:13	2019-11-22
***	Side Stories: Day of Reckoning	0:57:23	2019-11-27
***	Side Stories: Green Face	1:06:27	2019-12-04
393	The Murder of Girly Chew Hossencofft, Part I: My Sweet Goon	1:53:06	2019-12-06
***	Side Stories: Human Chimera	1:07:44	2019-12-11
394	The Murder of Girly Chew Hossencofft, Part II: President Goon	1:47:30	2019-12-13
***	Side Stories: Holiday Dumb Dumb	1:08:24	2019-12-19
395	Bob Berdella, Part I: Gary Jewman	1:32:17	2019-12-20
***	Side Stores: A Crime Against Cinema	0:44:24	2020-01-01
396	Bob Berdella, Part II: Icky Homosexual Party House 2	1:13:11	2020-01-04
***	Side Stories: Nerd Army	1:04:38	2020-01-09
***	The Ragged Stranger: A Chat with Harold Schechter	1:21:55	2020-01-10
***	Side Stories: Heat Up & Get Loose	1:02:48	2020-01-15
397	Heaven's Gate, Part I: A Cabo or a Wabo	2:05:39	2020-01-17
***	Side Stories: Repent or Die	1:15:42	2020-01-22
398	Heaven's Gate, Part II: Tomb Time	2:05:15	2020-01-25
***	Side Stories: Penis Man	1:13:26	2020-01-29
399	Heaven's Gate, Part III: Burrito Heaven	1:49:09	2020-02-01
***	Side Stories: Golden Girl	1:04:53	2020-02-05
***	Relaxed Fit: Holiday Magic / Misanthropic Luciferian Order	1:13:41	2020-02-07
***	Side Stories: Roomba Attack	1:05:57	2020-02-12
400	JFK / Lee Harvey Oswald, Part I: Lone Nut	2:05:23	2020-02-14
***	Side Stories: Tongue Collector	1:05:47	2020-02-19
401	JFK / Lee Harvey Oswald, Part II: The Grease Boy	1:42:14	2020-02-21
***	Side Stories: Coronavirus Cult	1:18:14	2020-02-26
402	JFK / Lee Harvey Oswald, Part III: The Assassination	1:42:27	2020-02-28
***	Side Stories: Samurai Sword Girlfriend	1:01:49	2020-03-04
403	JFK / Lee Harvey Oswald, Part IV: OSWALD!	1:56:34	2020-03-06
***	Side Stories: Hellish Rebuke	1:08:06	2020-03-12
***	Relaxed Fit: Marilyn Monroe And The President's Aspirin	1:14:15	2020-03-13
***	Side Stories: Real Doll Disappearance	1:08:23	2020-03-18
404	JFK Part V / The Conspiracy, Part I: Snarlin' Arlen	1:57:59	2020-03-21
***	Side Stories: Tiger King	1:19:35	2020-03-25
405	JFK Part VI / The Conspiracy, Part II: Executive Diapers and Also the Truth	2:26:57	2020-03-28
***	Side Stories: Grim Sleeper, Chicken Lover	1:20:27	2020-04-01
***	Relaxed Fit: Lead Masks Case / Zanesville Zoo	1:23:47	2020-04-04
***	Side Stories: Smart Toilet	1:10:18	2020-04-08
406	Giant Humanoids	1:32:37	2020-04-11
***	Side Stories: Psychic Nukes	1:08:50	2020-04-15
407	The Yorkshire Ripper, Part I: John Carpenter's Fonzie	1:49:56	2020-04-18
***	Side Stories: Piss Shrine	1:14:32	2020-04-22
408	The Yorkshire Ripper, Part II: The Chorlton Glumpers	1:41:22	2020-04-25
***	Side Stories: Space Poltergeist	1:04:54	2020-04-29
409	Gef the Talking Mongoose	1:45:20	2020-05-02
***	Side Stories: Plague Doctor	1:06:20	2020-05-06
***	Relaxed Fit: The Cardiff Giant	1:05:38	2020-05-09
***	Side Stories: Constipated Lizard	1:17:31	2020-05-13
410	Madame Blavatsky, Part I: There's Something Wrong With Jimmy	2:10:19	2020-05-16
***	Side Stories: Blue Lights Over Brazil	1:12:15	2020-05-20
411	Madame Blavatsky, Part II: Dr. Beard	1:47:57	2020-05-23
***	Side Stories: ANITA & The Black Hat Man	1:05:05	2020-05-28
412	Madame Blavatsky, Part III: The Secret Doctrine	2:20:06	2020-05-30
***	Side Stories: Don't Eat Grandpa	0:58:33	2020-06-03
***	Relaxed Fit: Buried Alive	1:14:50	2020-06-06
***	Side Stories: Treasure Hunt	1:14:49	2020-06-10
413	Lobotomies, Part I: The Cathartic and the Emetic	1:20:26	2020-06-12
***	Side Stories: eBay e-Hate	1:13:56	2020-06-17
414	Lobotomies, Part II: Assistant to the Bone Slicer	1:32:02	2020-06-19
***	Side Stories: Randonauts	1:04:15	2020-06-25
415	The Tall Whites	1:44:41	2020-06-26
***	Side Stories: Loch Ness Catfish	0:59:44	2020-07-01
***	Relaxed Fit: The Botched Lobotomies of Rosemary Kennedy & Howard Dully	1:07:10	2020-07-04
***	Side Stories: Jizzlaine	1:03:37	2020-07-08
416	Herbert Mullin, Part I: Blow Grass	1:55:53	2020-07-10
***	Side Stories: Semen-Tainted Flutes	1:00:03	2020-07-15
417	Herbert Mullin, Part II: Big Herb!	1:22:06	2020-07-17
***	Side Stories: Hex the Moon	1:09:22	2020-07-23
418	The Slenderman Enigma	1:26:57	2020-07-25
***	Side Stories: Alien Autopsy	0:57:02	2020-07-30
***	Relaxed Fit: Unsolved Mystery Round-Up	1:01:10	2020-08-01
***	Side Stories: 60-Foot Robot	1:05:14	2020-08-06
419	Jodi Arias, Part I: WAP	1:46:55	2020-08-08
***	Side Stories: The Giggle Button	1:07:28	2020-08-13
420	Jodi Arias, Part II: Juror #7	1:50:41	2020-08-15
***	Side Stories: Stuck in the Pipe	0:54:32	2020-08-20
421	The Beast of Boggy Creek	1:18:15	2020-08-24
***	Side Stories: Political Immunity	1:02:56	2020-09-02
422	The 1971 Manson Family Western Surplus Shoot-Out	0:55:20	2020-09-04
***	Side Stories: The Goose Who Wore Nikes	1:06:27	2020-09-09
423	Arthur Shawcross, Part I: Welcome to Watertown	1:40:11	2020-09-11
***	Side Stories: Slovenian Hand Scum	0:50:54	2020-09-16
424	Arthur Shawcross, Part II: Grandpa Mode	1:24:00	2020-09-18
***	Side Stories: That's a Brain!!	1:04:47	2020-09-23
425	Listenerpasta VII: The Slink	1:06:39	2020-09-25
***	Side Stories: Jesus of Siberia	0:57:04	2020-10-01
426	The Dangerous UFOs of Brazil	1:34:02	2020-10-03
***	Side Stores: Diabolical Stew of Human Remains	1:07:58	2020-10-08
427	The Bell Witch, Part I: Old Sugar Mouth	1:25:30	2020-10-10
***	Side Stories: Demonic Threesome	0:54:21	2020-10-15
428	The Bell Witch, Part II: Uncooked Sausage	1:38:09	2020-10-17
***	Side Stories: Northern Exposure	1:08:56	2020-10-21
429	Creepypasta XV: A Halloween to Regret	1:38:45	2020-10-24
***	Side Stories: Eunuch Maker	1:16:20	2020-10-28
430	Adolfo Constanzo, Part I: Room of the Dead	1:45:17	2020-10-31
***	Side Stories: Doctor Cake	0:57:09	2020-11-05
431	Adolfo Constanzo, Part II: El Doobie's Revenge	1:32:36	2020-11-07
***	Side Stories: Ghosted	1:01:11	2020-11-11
432	Adolfo Constanzo, Part III: Tossed Salad & Scrambled Eggs	1:47:01	2020-11-13
***	Side Stories: Wakey Wakey	1:05:30	2020-11-18
***	Relaxed Fit: The Secret Knowledge of the Crystal Skulls	1:07:09	2020-11-20
***	Dune: The Duke of Caladan - An Interview w/ Brian Herbert & Kevin Anderson	0:50:42	2020-11-25
***	Best of: Cannibalism	0:52:30	2020-11-27
***	Side Stories: B***hole Stories	1:24:16	2020-12-03
433	The Murderous Madness of the Twins Eriksson	1:40:16	2020-12-04
***	Side Stories: The Too Tall Bandit	1:03:56	2020-12-09
434	Roch Thériault & The Ant Hill Kids, Part I - Dümping Syndrome	1:47:45	2020-12-12
***	Side Stories: Sticky Space Odyssey	1:12:18	2020-12-16
435	Roch Thériault & The Ant Hill Kids, Part II - They Are Happy And Free To Leave	2:09:52	2020-12-19
***	Side Stories: Heartless	0:38:58	2020-12-23
***	Side Stories: Cheese Demon	0:59:37	2020-12-30
436	Roch Thériault & The Ant Hill Kids, Part III - Absolutely Fascinating!	2:25:38	2021-01-02
***	Side Stories: Granny Ripper	1:05:08	2021-01-06
437	The Wild World of Polyphagia	1:20:19	2021-01-08
***	Side Stories: Your Cock Is Mine Now	1:02:33	2021-01-13
438	John List, Part I - Wipe Out	1:52:25	2021-01-16
***	Side Stories: Magic Mushroom Injection	1:02:15	2021-01-20
439	John List, Part II - Daddy Train	1:42:02	2021-01-22
***	Side Stories: Bigfoot Season	1:04:12	2021-01-27
440	Spontaneous Human Combustion	1:15:05	2021-01-29
***	Side Stories: What's The Goop?	1:05:53	2021-02-03
441	Lake Monsters	1:43:03	2021-02-06
***	Side Stories: Deadly Snow	1:05:18	2021-02-10
442	Aleister Crowley, Part I: White Stains	2:28:06	2021-02-13
***	Side Stories: Bologna Smuggler	1:06:59	2021-02-18
443	Aleister Crowley, Part II: Every Man and Woman is a Star	2:19:06	2021-02-20
***	Side Stories: Scottish Kiss	1:01:23	2021-02-24
444	Aleister Crowley, Part III: The Wickedest Man in the world	2:20:58	2021-02-26
***	Side Stories: Snake Stories	1:05:56	2021-03-03
***	Relaxed Fit: The Ayahuasca Murders	0:58:06	2021-03-05
***	Side Stories: Legend of the Skelecaster	1:01:38	2021-03-10
445	Jack Unterweger, Part I: Mr. Nobody	1:25:03	2021-03-13
***	Side Stories: Olaf Assistant	1:02:04	2021-03-16
446	Jack Unterweger, Part II: I Love L.A.	1:48:20	2021-03-20
***	Side Stories: The Family Butcher	1:12:30	2021-03-24
447	The Coyame UFO Crash	1:23:24	2021-03-27
***	Side Stories: Balls for Ears	0:59:09	2021-03-31
***	Relaxed Fit: The 2nd Decennial Last Podcast On the Left March Madness of Murder	1:12:57	2021-04-02
***	Side Stories: Raven Thieves	1:02:10	2021-04-07
448	Alcatraz, Part I: Bird is the Word	1:32:53	2021-04-10
***	Side Stories: Prancer	0:59:00	2021-04-14
449	Alcatraz, Part II: The Dark Hole	1:32:44	2021-04-17
***	Side Stories: Croissant Cryptid	0:51:47	2021-04-21
450	Alcatraz, Part III: We Gotta Get Off This Rock	1:28:42	2021-04-24
***	Side Stories: Please Do Not Love Me	0:51:58	2021-04-28
451	Black Eyed Kids	1:14:50	2021-04-30
***	Side Stories: Honky Tonk Colostomy Bag	1:01:47	2021-05-05
***	Relaxed Fit: Love Has Won	1:21:15	2021-05-07
***	Side Stories: The Cannibal Killer of Ventas	0:50:54	2021-05-12
452	Danny Rolling, Part I: I Need a Job	1:13:11	2021-05-14
***	Side Stories: ShadowVision	0:58:36	2021-05-19
453	Danny Rolling, Part II: Bingo Bango Bongo	01:28:33	2021-05-21
***	Side Stories: Murderous Butt	0:55:56	2021-05-26
454	Unidentified Submerged Objects	1:18:19	2021-05-28
***	Side Stories: Gun Church	0:54:56	2021-06-02
455	The Goblin Universe	1:14:20	2021-06-04
***	Side Stories: Dongcopter	0:53:55	2021-06-09
456	The Black Death, Part I - Stomp a Gerbil, Bribe a Rat	1:42:05	2021-06-11
***	Side Stories: Whale of a Tale	0:53:02	2021-06-16
457	The Black Death, Part II - Passport to Hell	01:14:53	2021-06-19
***	Side Stories: Sugar Water Burn	0:53:22	2021-06-23
458	The Black Death, Part III - The Horny Popes	1:48:16	2021-06-25
***	Side Stories: Sky Tuna	0:55:35	2021-06-30
459	The Black Death, Part IV - Meet the Flagellants!	1:29:55	2021-07-02
***	Side Stories: Snake News	0:49:31	2021-07-07
460	The Black Death, Part V - Mark of the Beaver	1:21:33	2021-07-09
***	Side Stories: Pact With The Devil	1:02:34	2021-07-14
***	Relaxed Fit: The Moonshaft	0:59:30	2021-07-16
***	Side Stories: Peacock Assassin	0:54:35	2021-07-21
461	USS Indianapolis	1:44:18	2021-07-23
***	Side Stories: Hero Edition	0:42:36	2021-07-28
***	Best Of: Cults	1:16:51	2021-07-30
***	Side Stories: Father of Cheddar Goblin	1:05:42	2021-08-04
***	Did You Hear What Eddie Gein Done: A Chat with Harold Schechter & Eric Powell	0:56:07	2021-08-06
***	Side Stories: That's A Moray	1:02:30	2021-08-11
462	Billy the Kid, Part I - Butter Bandit	1:13:23	2021-08-13
***	Side Stories: Hodag	0:59:06	2021-08-18
463	Billy the Kid, Part II - Regulators Gonna Regulate	1:31:18	2021-08-20
***	Side Stories: Mystery At Devil's Gulch	0:55:53	2021-08-25
464	Billy the Kid, Part III - Juan Largo	1:16:39	2021-08-27
***	Side Stories: The Chicago Scrambler	1:04:41	2021-09-01
465	Billy the Kid, Part IV - Wanted Dead or Alive	1:23:26	2021-09-03
***	Side Stories: The Murdaugh Family Murders	0:53:09	2021-09-08
466	Rodney Alcala, Part I - Wanna See a Pretty Picture?	1:13:39	2021-09-10
***	Side Stories: Semen Syringe	1:06:55	2021-09-15
467	Rodney Alcala, Part II - Bananas For Dinner	1:16:40	2021-09-17
***	Side Stories: Bean Bandits	1:00:00	2021-09-22
***	Relaxed Fit: Single-Use Cryptids	1:08:16	2021-09-24
***	Side Stories: Free Car Smell	1:08:47	2021-09-27
468	Mike Warnke, Part I - Satanism for Dummies	1:31:12	2021-10-01
***	Side Stories: Take the Money and Run	1:07:12	2021-10-06
469	Mike Warnke, Part II - Welcome to Satanville	1:49:54	2021-10-08
***	Side Stories: Hanging With Gary	0:55:59	2021-10-13
470	Karla Homolka & Paul Bernardo, Part I - Coroners, Coffins and Crabs	1:48:50	2021-10-15
***	Side Stories: Sip the Straw	0:54:05	2021-10-20
471	Karla Homolka & Paul Bernardo, Part II - Deadly Innocence	1:41:48	2021-10-22
***	Side Stories: Creepypasta XVI	1:22:12	2021-10-27
472	Karla Homolka & Paul Bernardo, Part III - Canadian Psycho	1:47:59	2021-10-29
***	Side Stories: Fly the Too-Friendly Skies	0:50:26	2021-11-03
***	Relaxed Fit: Where Are They Now?	1:14:53	2021-11-05
***	Side Stories: Toilet IED	0:51:39	2021-11-10
473	Anneliese Michel, Part I - The Devil Is Inside You	1:31:55	2021-11-12
***	Side Stories: Violin Tendencies	0:49:47	2021-11-17
474	Anneliese Michel, Part II - Dig Up the Corpse!	1:32:29	2021-11-19
***	Side Stories: Cocaine Cactus	1:01:23	2021-12-01
475	Lizzie Borden, Part I - 41 Whacks	1:29:51	2021-12-03
***	Side Stories: Butthole Bomb Squad	0:50:57	2021-12-08
476	Lizzie Borden, Part II - ...With An Axe!	1:29:16	2021-12-10
***	Side Stories: Raccoon Attack	1:09:02	2021-12-15
***	Relaxed Fit: Deadly Exorcisms	1:09:50	2021-12-17
***	Side Stories: Monkeys Versus Dogs	0:55:30	2021-12-29
477	Elizabeth Klarer - Push The Red Button	1:22:21	2021-12-31
***	Side Stories: Squirrels Gone Wild	0:57:38	2022-01-05
478	Juana Barraza - La Mataviejitas	1:38:54	2022-01-07
***	Side Stories: Pee-Pee Man & Dr. Pooper	0:59:44	2022-01-14
479	Ma Barker, Part I - A Boy's Best Friend Is His Mom	1:21:28	2022-01-14
***	Side Stories: Interdimensional Alligator People	1:06:22	2022-01-19
480	Ma Barker, Part II - Mama's Boys	1:41:24	2022-01-21
***	Side Stories: The Axe Effect	0:59:06	2022-01-26
481	Ma Barker, Part III - Mother of the Year	1:29:16	2022-01-28
***	Side Stories: Golden Corral Melee	1:00:09	2022-02-02
482	MKUltra, Part I - The Manchurian Candidate	1:55:55	2022-02-04
***	Side Stories: The Mayonnaise Incident	0:58:15	2022-02-09
483	MKUltra, Part II - No Shirt, No Bodies, No Problem	1:49:33	2022-02-11
***	Side Stories: Joe Rogan 2.0	0:52:38	2022-02-16
484	MKUltra, Part III - The Cup and Balls	1:59:01	2022-02-18
***	Side Stories: Hank the Tank	0:53:20	2022-02-23
485	MKUltra, Part IV - App-opp-alypse	1:47:45	2022-02-25
***	Side Stories: Fighting Over Food	0:50:05	2022-03-02
486	MKUltra, Part V - Acoustic Kitty	1:57:50	2022-03-04
***	Side Stories: #ShakespeareSh*tstorm w/Lloyd Kaufman	1:12:08	2022-03-09
***	Relaxed Fit: The Disappearance of Frederick Valentich	0:56:26	2022-03-11
***	Side Stories: Taking Out the Trash	0:54:38	2022-03-16
487	Randy Kraft, Part I - Fisticuffs and Fellatio	1:29:15	2022-03-18
***	Side Stories: Poo Poo Pickle	1:04:02	2022-03-23
488	Randy Kraft, Part II - Just Like Bridge	1:21:18	2022-03-25
***	Side Stories: Daffodils vs. Dandelions	0:58:16	2022-03-30
489	The Children of Thunder, Part I - That's Not Gritz!	0:51:19	2022-04-06
***	Side Stories: The Leprechaun Flu	0:58:16	2022-04-06
490	The Children of Thunder, Part II - Yada Yada Yada	1:25:54	2022-04-08
***	Side Stories: Kind of Kinky	0:45:03	2022-04-13
***	Relaxed Fit: Creepypasta XVII - My Teeth Itch	1:28:40	2022-04-15
***	Side Stories: Savage Creatures	0:59:30	2022-04-21
***	Relaxed Fit: Transhumanism, Part I - A Chimp None the Less	1:14:16	2022-04-23
***	Side Stories: Magnetron	1:00:59	2022-04-27
***	Relaxed Fit: Teal Swan - A Spiritual Science Situation w/ Natalie Jean and Amber Nelson (Some Place Under Neith)	1:09:17	2022-04-29
***	Side Stories: Try to Solve Diarrhea Within Your Community	0:59:43	2022-05-05
491	Blackbeard, Part I - Dead Men Tell No Tales, Literally	1:14:55	2022-05-07
***	Side Stories: Something to Do With Love	0:54:04	2022-05-11
492	Blackbeard, Part II - P is for Pirate	1:13:34	2022-05-13
***	Side Stories: Less People More Chickens	1:00:54	2022-05-18
493	Blackbeard, Part III - The Blackbeard Effect	1:15:45	2022-05-20
***	Side Stories: Transpoopanism	1:05:01	2022-05-25
***	Relaxed Fit: Transhumanism, Part II - Violent Optimism	1:21:45	2022-05-27
***	Side Stories: Chinese Zodiac Killer	1:02:22	2022-06-01
494	Nannie Doss - The Worst Babysitter of All Time	1:51:36	2022-06-03
***	Side Stories: Phantom Hums	0:57:58	2022-06-08
495	Leopold and Loeb, Part I - The Übermensch	1:37:37	2022-06-10
***	Side Stories: Near Death By Chocolate	1:11:16	2022-06-15
496	Leopold and Loeb, Part II - A Spirit of Adventure	1:20:36	2022-06-17
***	Side Stories: Rise of the Frog Army	0:56:39	2022-06-22
497	Leopold and Loeb, Part III - What About The Birds?	1:34:41	2022-06-24
***	Side Stories: The Ragdoll Husband	0:51:04	2022-06-29
***	Relaxed Fit: Mythological Sex Beasts	1:13:48	2022-07-01
***	Side Stories: Ignorant Fools Acting Stupid	1:04:10	2022-07-07
498	Joel Rifkin, Part I - Addicted to the Night	1:52:48	2022-07-09
***	Side Stories: Going Stag!	1:08:16	2022-07-13
499	Joel Rifkin, Part II - Garden of Bones	1:51:38	2022-07-15
***	Side Stories: The Henry 200	1:10:03	2022-07-20
499.5	The Ariel School Phenomenon - Pull the Other Leg	1:11:59	2022-07-22
***	Side Stories: Five Years of Flatulence	1:00:39	2022-07-27
500	The Salem Witch Trials, Part I - Get Your Buckles!	1:51:06	2022-07-29
***	Side Stories: Jurassic Pork	0:49:06	2022-08-03
501	The Salem Witch Trials, Part II - Titters Over Time	2:15:28	2022-08-05
***	Side Stories: The Chorizo Incident	1:00:15	2022-08-10
502	The Salem Witch Trials, Part III - Witch of the Week	1:53:14	2022-08-12
***	Side Stories: Queen of Canada	0:50:31	2022-08-17
503	The Salem Witch Trials, Part IV - Crossing the Rubicon	1:27:51	2022-08-19
***	Orphan First Kill: An Interview with William Brent Bell	0:34:48	2022-08-24
***	Side Stories: It's Raining Umbrellas	0:58:14	2022-08-26
***	How to Catch a Killer: An Interview with Katherine Ramsland	0:44:37	2022-08-31
***	LPOTL Summer Movie Drive-In Special w/ Diana Prince	0:55:37	2022-09-02
***	Side Stories: Time Slippin'	0:53:37	2022-09-07
504	Charles Starkweather, Part I - One Teddy Bear Please	1:40:16	2022-09-09
***	Side Stories: Loab	0:54:55	2022-09-14
505	Charles Starkweather, Part II - Charlie's Massacre	1:52:37	2022-09-16
***	Side Stories: Chicken Cult	1:02:21	2022-09-21
506	Fred and Rose West, Part I - A Match Made in Hell	1:30:04	2022-09-23
***	Side Stories: Beyond Road Rage	0:55:26	2022-09-28
507	Fred and Rose West, Part II - Mum & Dad's Room	1:40:49	2022-09-30
***	Side Stories: Sins of Our Mother	0:44:53	2022-10-05
508	The Incident at Devil's Den - The Monkey Men	1:18:10	2022-10-07
***	Side Stories: The Mystery Moans	0:51:30	2022-10-12
509	Creepypasta XVIII - Mr. Bojangles	1:04:17	2022-10-14
***	Side Stories: The World's Worst Nurse	0:54:21	2022-10-19
***	Relaxed Fit: Lucy Letby	0:52:50	2022-10-21
***	Side Stories: The House on Horny Hill	0:51:57	2022-10-26
510	The Demon House of Gary, Indiana - Portal to Hell	1:13:16	2022-10-29
***	Side Stories: The Neighborhood Gimp	0:57:17	2022-11-02
511	The Bath School Massacre - The Biggest A**hole of the 20th Century	1:34:40	2022-11-04
***	Side Stories: Crankin' It	0:53:18	2022-11-09
512	Jack Parsons, Part I - The Suicide Squad	1:37:38	2022-11-11
***	Side Stories: My Favorite Foot	0:59:05	2022-11-16
513	Jack Parsons, Part II - A Two Edged Sword	1:39:20	2022-11-18
***	Inside Shudder: An Interview with Craig Engler	0:32:02	2022-11-23
***	Best of: Alien Abductions	01:16:55	2022-11-25
***	Side Stories: Cheese Money	0:47:33	2022-11-30
514	Jack Parsons, Part III - Becky Does Babylon	1:38:11	2022-12-02
***	Side Stories: How to Get Rid of Tapeworms	0:59:05	2022-12-07
515	Jack Parsons, Part IV - Mahalo	1:40:10	2022-12-09
***	Side Stories: Reverse Episode	0:45:12	2022-12-14
516	The Pennsylvania UFO Bigfoot Invasion of 1973 - The Double Flap	1:39:08	2022-12-16
***	Side Stories: X-Mas Redemption	0:51:06	2022-12-21
***	Relaxed Fit: The 2022 Christmas True Crime Roundup	1:09:52	2022-12-23
***	The United States of Cryptids: A Conversation with J.W. Ocker	0:44:17	2022-12-28
***	Blue Book: A Conversation with James Tynion IV	0:53:01	2022-12-30
***	Side Stories: The Moscow Murderer	0:59:59	2023-01-05
517	The Troubled Teen Industry, Part I: Elan School - Tough Love	1:37:49	2023-01-07
***	Side Stories: Masturbating Walrus	1:00:22	2023-01-11
518	The Troubled Teen Industry, Part II: Synanon - The Dirty Double Dozen	1:52:48	2023-01-13
***	Side Stories: Strange Clouds	0:50:51	2023-01-18
519	The Troubled Teen Industry, Part III: Joe Ricci and the Murder of Martha Moxley	1:50:59	2023-01-20
***	Side Stories: Death by Kite	1:13:07	2023-01-25
***	Relaxed Fit: The Trinity UFO Crash	1:12:17	2023-01-27
***	Side Stories: Banana Butt	0:58:11	2023-02-01
520	The Tragedy of the Essex Part I: Thar She Blows!	1:38:33	2023-02-03
***	Side Stories: Alrighty Then!	0:55:33	2023-02-08
521	The Tragedy of the Essex Part II: A Belly Full Of Blood	1:41:14	2023-02-10
***	LPN Deep Dives: A Court of Thorns and Roses / Episode 0: Enter the Maastiverse	0:28:34	2023-02-14
***	Side Stores: Head in a Bucket	0:55:59	2023-02-15
522	David Miscavige Part I: Scientology Reborn	2:05:16	2023-02-17
***	LPN Deep Dives: A Court of Thorns and Roses / Episode 1: This Poor Provincial Town	1:23:35	2021-02-21
***	Side Stories: 'Do Not Engage' Cookie Monster	0:53:16	2023-02-22
523	David Miscavige Part II: A Convenient Belief	2:09:31	2023-02-24
***	Side Stories: The Alux	0:51:35	2023-03-01
524	David Miscavige Part III: Top Gun	2:27:45	2023-03-04
***	Side Stories: My Spiritual Girlfriend	0:57:07	2023-03-08
***	Relaxed Fit: True Crime Roundup - Spring 2023	1:10:15	2023-03-10
***	Side Stories: Fellas With Attitude	0:57:30	2023-03-15
525	Gilles de Rais Part I: Bluebeard	1:47:54	2023-03-17
***	Side Stories: Prison Pigeons	1:03:06	2023-03-22
526	Gilles de Rais Part II: The Real Gille	1:54:28	2023-03-24
***	Side Stories: Show Me The Toes!	0:58:33	2023-03-29
527	Gilles de Rais Part III - Letters to Satan	1:57:52	2023-04-01
***	Side Stories: Sad Stories	0:56:36	2023-04-05
***	Relaxed Fit: True Crime Roundup - Stephen Paddock	1:23:44	2023-04-07
***	Side Stories: Suck My Tongue	0:56:18	2023-04-12
528	The Berwyn Mountain UFO Incident - Roswelsh	1:49:42	2023-04-14
***	Side Stories: Rent-A-Hitman	1:03:02	2023-04-19
529	Mass Hysteria Through Time	1:36:32	2023-04-21
***	Side Stories: Weaponized w/ Jeremy Corbell & George Knapp	0:58:39	2023-04-26
***	Best of: Cryptids	1:25:37	2023-04-28
***	Side Stories: Mysterious Cattle Mutilations	1:01:00	2023-05-03
530	The Chicago Rippers Part I - A World of Nightmares	1:27:38	2023-05-05
***	Side Stories: The Spaghetti Incident	1:01:26	2023-05-10
531	The Chicago Rippers Part II - Lets Get Into It	1:36:41	2023-05-12
***	Side Stories: The Return of The Gimp	1:02:35	2023-05-17
532	La Llorona - The Legend of the Weeping Woman	1:14:13	2023-05-19
***	Side Stories: Poo-Poo Rain	1:01:13	2023-05-24
***	Relaxed Fit: True Crime Roundup - The Cheesecake Killer	1:03:39	2023-05-26
***	Side Stories: The 'Uncorrupt' Nun	1:06:15	2023-05-31
533	The Manhattan Project Part I - The Living Dead	2:08:19	2023-06-02
***	Side Stories: Exotic Material	0:50:28	2023-06-07
534	The Manhattan Project Part II - A Numbers Game	2:07:23	2023-06-09
***	Side Stories: Aliens in the Backyard	1:02:03	2023-06-14
535	The Manhattan Project Part III - Sometimes You Need a Daddy	2:11:03	2023-06-16
***	Side Stories: Under Pressure	1:05:31	2023-06-21
536	The Manhattan Project Part IV - I Am Become Death	1:42:14	2023-06-23
***	Side Stories: The Porridge Whisperer	0:53:26	2023-06-29
537	The Manhattan Project Part V - Frankenstein's Monster	1:52:14	2023-06-30
***	Side Stories: Hidden in Plane Sight	0:54:01	2023-07-06
538	The Manhattan Project Part VI - The Greatest Generation	2:09:45	2023-07-08
***	Side Stories: The Lake Tahoe Foot Fondler	1:08:20	2023-07-13
***	Relaxed Fit: True Crime Roundup - The Eunuch Maker w/ Patton Oswalt	0:59:06	2023-07-14
***	Side Stories: Nothing but Blubber	0:59:28	2023-07-19
539	Mothman : Redux Part I - Bighoot	1:31:07	2023-07-21
***	Side Stories: Unmasked	0:56:14	2023-07-26
540	Mothman : Redux Part II - Don't Kill The Messenger	1:13:57	2023-07-28
***	Side Stories: Non-Human Biologics	0:53:46	2023-08-03
541	Creepypasta XIX - The Law of the Jungle	1:34:23	2023-08-05
***	Side Stories: Face Peelers	0:53:48	2023-08-09
542	The Fayetteville Incident - My Favorite Shape	1:49:50	2023-08-11
***	Side Stories: When Otters Attack!	1:07:15	2023-08-16
***	Relaxed Fit: True Crime Roundup - The Melbourne Mushroom Murders	0:58:39	2023-08-18
***	The Man With All The Answers: An Interview with Ken Jennings	0:37:24	2023-08-23
543	Q&A II	1:01:47	2023-08-25
***	Side Stories: Stories That Haunted Us	1:00:44	2023-08-30
544	Hardcore Historians - An Interview with Dan Carlin	1:00:45	2023-09-01
***	Side Stories: Biohazard	0:57:21	2023-09-06
***	No Dogs in Space: An Introduction to Krautrock / Amon Düül II Pt I	1:40:51	2023-09-07
545	John Holmes and the Wonderland Murders Part I - Here Comes Johnny Wadd	1:47:19	2023-09-08
***	Side Stories: The Bullet in the Backseat	0:57:42	2023-09-13
546	John Holmes and the Wonderland Murders Part II - Four on the Floor	1:40:29	2023-09-15
***	Side Stories: Peruvian Alien Mummies	1:03:17	2023-09-20
547	Jeffrey MacDonald Part I - Acid is Groovy, Kill the Pigs	1:25:00	2023-09-22
***	Side Stories: The Delphi Indiana Murders	1:07:25	2023-09-27
548	Jeffrey MacDonald Part II - The Woman in the Floppy Hat	1:22:06	2023-09-29
***	Side Stories: Who Killed Tupac?	1:05:34	2023-10-04
549	Andrew Cunanan Part I - Lewd Doings	1:40:48	2023-10-06
***	Side Stories: Ham Hands	1:15:41	2023-10-11
550	Andrew Cunanan Part II - The Kept Maniac	1:24:11	2023-10-13
***	Side Stories: Dirt-O-Lantern	1:11:29	2023-10-19
551	Andrew Cunanan Part III - Welcome to Miami	1:10:15	2023-10-20
***	Side Stories: Listenerpasta VIII - Strange Milk	1:08:27	2023-10-26
552	Madame LaLaurie Part I - The Lady of the House	1:09:36	2023-10-27
***	Side Stories: Bow & Arrow Rampage	1:00:58	2023-11-01
553	Madame LaLaurie Part II - Evil Enough	1:07:02	2023-11-03
***	Side Stories: Lick-or-Treat	1:04:06	2023-11-08
554	Necrophilia	1:45:58	2023-11-11
***	Side Stories: Twin Flames	1:15:47	2023-11-15
***	Relaxed Fit: True Crime Roundup - Nightmare at 40,000 Feet	1:04:22	2023-11-18
***	Side Stories: Spanksgiving	0:48:18	2023-11-22
***	Murderabilia: A Chat with Harold Schechter	1:03:32	2023-11-24
***	Side Stories: It's a Small World	0:56:18	2023-11-29
555	The Hatfield and McCoy Feud Part I - Hog Justice	1:43:12	2023-12-01
***	Side Stories: Charged Lemonade	1:03:31	2023-12-06
556	The Hatfield and McCoy Feud Part II - Murderland	1:30:18	2023-12-09
***	Side Stories: The Grinch	1:07:27	2023-12-13
557	Survival in the Andes Part I - Stayin' Alive	1:26:18	2023-12-15
***	Side Stories: The Gingerbread Man	1:06:47	2023-12-20
558	Survival in the Andes Part II - Buried Alive	1:01:17	2023-12-22
***	Side Stories: Santa Stories	0:47:19	2023-12-27
559	Survival in the Andes Part III - Still Alive	0:51:47	2023-12-29
***	Side Stories: The Release of Gypsy Rose	1:02:06	2024-01-03
***	Relaxed Fit: True Crime Round-Up - My Other Car is a Sex Doll	1:01:40	2024-01-05
***	Side Stories: Groundlog Day	1:10:24	2024-01-11
560	The Alaska Triangle	1:31:20	2024-01-12
***	Side Stories: Tunnel Tales	0:59:40	2024-01-17
561	Cryptid Towns	1:27:10	2024-01-19
***	Side Stories: Found Frozen	1:13:43	2024-01-24
562	Haunted Dolls : Redux	1:41:28	2024-01-27
***	Side Stories: The Fish Bandit	0:55:41	2024-01-31
***	Relaxed Fit: The Curious Case of Natalia Grace	1:15:50	2024-02-02
***	Side Stories: Alien in the Garden	1:10:13	2024-02-07
***	Relaxed Fit: True Crime Round-Up - Murder & Onions	1:09:25	2024-02-09
***	Side Stories: Under the Sea	1:07:03	2024-02-14
563	Anders Breivik Part I - Portrait of an Asshole	1:43:36	2024-02-16
***	Side Stories: Diaper Spa	1:19:27	2024-02-21
564	Anders Breivik Part II - Mommy's Little Monster	1:29:24	2024-02-24
***	Blue Book: 1947 - An Interview with James Tynion IV	1:01:41	2024-02-26
***	Side Stories: Some Stories	1:15:33	2024-02-28
565	Anders Breivik Part III - 22 July	1:32:30	2024-03-02
***	Side Stories: Son Swap	1:06:40	2024-03-06
***	Relaxed Fit: The 3rd Decennial Last Podcast On the Left March Madness of Murder	1:22:36	2024-03-08
***	Side Stories: Sky Poop	1:14:32	2024-03-13
566	David Icke and the Reptilians Part I - The Biggest Secret	2:07:38	2024-03-16
***	Late Night with the Devil: An Interview with David Dastmalchian	1:03:50	2024-03-18
***	Side Stories: Cat Crimes	1:12:01	2024-03-20
567	David Icke and the Reptilians Part II - A Life of Illusion	1:35:05	2024-03-22
***	Side Stories: Vampire Facial	1:05:15	2024-03-28
568	Herb Baumeister Part I - The Bone Twins	1:55:34	2024-03-30
***	Side Stories: Mo Money Mo Problems	0:59:54	2024-04-04
569	Herb Baumeister Part II - The Haunting at Fox Hollow Farm	1:25:42	2024-04-06
***	Side Stories: Vagina Kung Fu	1:03:04	2024-04-10
***	SNEAK PEEK /// Last Update on the Left JonBénet Ramsey	1:01:27	2024-04-12
***	Side Stories: The Death of OJ Simpson	0:59:44	2024-04-17
570	The Snowtown Murders Part I - The Salisbury Mistakes	1:46:55	2024-04-19
***	Side Stories: Son of Ram	1:14:23	2024-04-24
571	The Snowtown Murders Part II - Selling the Drama	1:09:08	2024-04-26
***	Transmedium - Fast Movers & USOs: An Interview with Darcy Weir	0:58:27	2024-05-01
***	Killing Time with John Wayne Gacy: An Interview with Karen Conti	0:51:51	2024-05-03
***	Side Stories: Marcus Meets a Ghost	1:02:34	2024-05-08
572	The Snowtown Murders Part III - The Three Amigos	1:22:15	2024-05-10
***	Side Stories: A Tale of Hit & Run	1:05:14	2024-05-16
573	Ed and Lorraine Warren Part I - Go Get Me The Book!	1:45:08	2024-05-17
574	Ed and Lorraine Warren Part II - Make It Scary	1:54:00	2024-05-24
***	Side Stories: Mystery Meat Pile	1:09:00	2024-05-29
575	Ed and Lorraine Warren Part III - Dealing with Demons	1:31:00	2024-05-31
***	Side Stories: Killdozer 20th Anniversary	1:05:00	2024-06-05
576	Armin Meiwes Part I - Cainnibal Cafe	1:16:00	2024-06-07
***	Side Stories: Free Joey!	1:16:00	2024-06-12
577	Armin Meiwes Part II - The Final Taboo	1:48:00	2024-06-14
***	Side Stories: The Fourth Top	1:04:10	2024-06-19
578	Patty Hearst Part I - 57 Days	1:55:01	2024-06-22
***	Side Stories: The Tragic School Bus	1:06:53	2024-06-24
579	Patty Hearst Part II - The Liberation Zone	1:42:41	2024-06-29
***	Side Stories: Back to School	0:59:03	2024-07-04
580	Patty Hearst Part III - I, Tania	1:35:27	2024-07-06
***	Side Stories: Gypsy Rose Pregnant!	1:10:56	2024-07-11
581	Patty Hearst Part IV - The Missing Year	1:45:20	2024-07-12
***	Side Stories: Soup Watch 2024	1:14:44	2024-07-17
582	Aliens Attack Part I - Phil Schneider	1:31:50	2024-07-20
***	Side Stories: Death By Mukbang	1:14:50	2024-07-24
583	Aliens Attack Part II - The Falcon Lake Incident & Kelly-Hopkinsville Encounter	1:19:54	2024-07-26
584	Creepypasta XX - The Big One	1:13:19	2024-08-02
***	Side Stories: Movie Stories	1:01:08	2024-08-07
585	Australian Poltergeists Part I - Polts & Stones	1:02:17	2024-08-09
***	Side Stories: The Devil's Marbles	1:06:22	2024-08-14
586	Australian Poltergeists Part II - That's not a Cross...	0:52:49	2024-08-16
***	Side Stories: Fraud Stories	1:14:46	2024-08-22
587	UFO Roundup - Contact in the Desert 2024 w/ Dave Foley	1:05:00	2024-08-23
***	UFOs in the UK: An Interview with Nick Pope	0:38:18	2024-08-30
***	Best Of: Hauntings	1:42:02	2024-08-30
***	Prescription for Pain: An Interview with Philip Eil	0:45:48	2024-08-30
***	RE-WEAPONIZED: An Interview with George Knapp & Jeremy Corbell	0:44:21	2024-09-06
588	Horrors of Sea-World Part I - The Perfect Killer	1:13:54	2024-09-06
***	Side Stories: smartschoolboy9	1:04:30	2024-09-12
589	Horrors of Sea-World Part II - Free Tilly	1:07:17	2024-09-13
***	Side Stories: Hvaldimir the Russian Spy Whale	1:06:40	2024-09-18
590	Sovereign Citizens vs. Mormons w/ Natalie Jean & Amber Nelson	1:21:26	2024-09-20
***	Side Stories: The Suicide Pod	1:13:59	2024-09-25
591	Josef Fritzl Part I - The Dungeon Master	1:23:45	2024-09-27
***	Side Stories: Baby Oiled to Death	1:08:40	2024-10-02
592	Josef Fritzl Part II - The Family Downstairs	1:06:31	2024-10-04
***	Side Stories: The Pee Bandit	1:15:43	2024-10-09
593	Josef Fritzl Part III - Fritzl's Pretzels	1:10:55	2024-10-11
***	Side Stories: Pee Bono	0:56:07	2024-10-16
594	The Krugersdorp Murders Part I - Dorp on Devil	1:39:50	2024-10-19
***	Side Stories: Movie Stories II	1:06:43	2024-10-23
595	The Krugersdorp Murders Part II - Me, Myself, The Werewolf, and I	1:54:59	2024-10-25
***	Side Stories: Halloween Ham	1:16:00	2024-10-30
***	Terrifier 3: An Interview with David Howard Thornton	0:42:00	2024-10-31
596	The Krugersdorp Cult Murders Part III - Your English Teacher Loves Murder	1:38:00	2024-11-01
***	Side Stores: Squirrel Stories	0:57:00	2024-11-06
597	The Krugersdorp Cult Murders Part IV - The Werewolf of Wall Street	1:33:00	2024-11-08
***	Side Stories: Fishy Business	1:04:00	2024-11-13
598	The Horrible Lives and Deaths of the Saints-The OGs	1:30:00	2024-11-15
***	Side Stories: Blaming Bears	0:50:00	2024-11-20
***	Florida Files: Eaten Alive	1:32:17	2024-11-22
***	Side Stories: Pizza Problems	1:06:27	2024-11-27
***	Life After Death: An Interview with Damien Echols & Lorri Davis	1:17:42	2024-11-29
***	Side Stories: Attack of the Drones	1:02:32	2024-12-04
599	The Horrible Lives and Deaths of the Saints - The Middle Ages	1:14:09	2024-12-06
***	Side Stories: The Healthcare Killer	1:17:59	2024-12-11
600	The Black Dahlia Murder Part I - The Girl from Hollywood	1:50:15	2024-12-13
***	Side Stories: Revenge of the Drones	1:18:30	2024-12-18
601	The Black Dahlia Murder Part II - The Gangster Squad	1:57:58	2024-12-20
***	Side Stories: Christmas Movie Stories	1:05:46	2024-12-25
***	Strange Customs: An Interview with Sasha Sagan	0:53:34	2024-12-27
***	Side Stories: Investigation Alien w/ George Knapp	1:02:02	2025-01-01
602	The Black Dahlia Murder Part III - Blood and Brown	1:32:55	2025-01-03
***	Side Stories: Christmas Crimes	1:20:00	2025-01-08
603	The Black Dahlia Murder Part IV - Exquisite Corpse	1:31:00	2025-01-10
***	Side Stories: Body Parts for Sale	1:03:00	2025-01-15
604	Newlywed Murders - Newlywed and Newly-Dead	1:13:33	2025-01-17
***	Side Stories: The Audition	1:06:06	2025-01-22
605	The Tragedy of the Batavia Part I - Spice World	1:49:46	2025-01-25
***	Side Stories: Devil at the Doorstep	1:10:09	2025-01-29
606	The Tragedy of the Batavia Part II - Batavia's Graveyard	1:45:44	2025-01-31
***	Side Stories: The Zizian Cult Murders	1:11:00	2025-02-05
607	The Tragedy of the Batavia Part III - Bored to Death	1:57:05	2025-02-08
***	Side Stories: Bitch Stories	1:30:04	2025-02-12
608	The Tragedy of the Batavia Part IV - My Boss is Gonna Kill Me!	1:46:24	2025-02-15
***	Side Stories: Tastes Like Tradition	1:24:03	2025-02-19
609	Lori Vallow and Chad Daybell - The Doomsday Murders Part I - Beyond the Veil	1:55:29	2025-02-21
***	Side Stories: Soder Stories	1:16:27	2025-02-26
610	Lori Vallow and Chad Daybell - The Doomsday Murders Part II - Ticking Time Bomb	1:46:28	2025-03-01
***	Side Stories: Casey Anthony, Legal Advice	1:33:47	2025-03-05
611	Lori Vallow and Chad Daybell - The Doomsday Murders Part III - Zombie Apocalypse	2:22:24	2025-03-07
***	Side Stories: Amouranth Home Invasion	1:30:24	2025-03-12
612	Lori Vallow and Chad Daybell - The Doomsday Murders Part IV - Pet Semetary	2:17:40	2025-03-14
***	Side Stories: Bad Mormons	1:20:10	2025-03-19
***	Relaxed Fit: The 4th Annual* Last Podcast on the Left March Madness of Murder	1:24:36	2025-03-21
***	Side Stories: Atomic Wedgie	1:22:34	2025-03-26
613	Creepypasta XXI - The Severance	1:11:50	2025-03-27
***	Side Stories: Bagpipes & Body Bags	1:22:09	2025-04-02
614	Pyromania	1:47:50	2025-04-04
***	Side Stories: Back in Schabusiness	1:12:28	2025-04-09
615	The Montauk Project Part I - The Truth Behind The Truth Behind The Lies	1:46:58	2025-04-11
***	Sinners: An Interview with Ryan Coogler	0:35:56	2025-04-16
***	Side Stories: Say It Ain't So	0:58:32	2025-04-16
616	The Montauk Project Part II - Livin' in the Future	1:48:03	2025-04-18
***	Last Update on the Left - Episode 1 - Lord RayEl Revisited	0:52:36	2025-04-21
***	Side Stories: Beyond Contact w/ Captain Ron Janix	1:26:42	2025-04-23
617	The Black Knight Satellite	1:18:51	2025-04-25
***	Side Stories: The R Train	1:19:03	2025-04-30
618	Martin Bryant Part I - The Most Irritating Man in History	1:20:57	2025-05-02
***	Side Stories: Movie Stories III	1:04:58	2025-05-07
619	Martin Bryant Part II - The Port Arthur Massacre	1:24:21	2025-05-09
***	Last Update on the Left - Episode 2 - Enfield Poltergeist Strikes Back	0:52:47	2025-05-12
***	Side Stories: Raccoon with a Meth Pipe	1:19:48	2025-05-14
620	The Miseducation of Ed Larson - JFK & Government Conspiracies	1:08:27	2025-05-16
***	Side Stories: Annabelle Rides Again	1:06:30	2025-05-21
***	Last Update on the Left - Episode 4 - Columbine Revisited	1:01:50	2025-05-23
***	Side Stories: Breast Friends	1:01:24	2025-05-28
***	Bring Her Back: An Interview with Danny & Michael Philippou	0:57:06	2025-05-29
621	The Assassination of Abraham Lincoln Part I - All The World's a Stage	1:50:13	2025-05-30
***	Side Stories: The Buga Sphere	1:17:05	2025-06-04
622	The Assassination of Abraham Lincoln Part II - Death Wish	1:36:21	2025-06-06
***	Side Stories: Sincere Stories	1:08:52	2025-06-11
623	The Assassination of Abraham Lincoln Part III - Sic Semper Tyranus	1:38:09	2025-06-13
***	Side Stories: Sole Survivor	1:05:35	2025-06-17
624	The Assassination of Abraham Lincoln Part IV - Madder than a Hatter	1:32:57	2025-06-20
***	Last Update on the Left - Episode 5 - Mark David Chapman Returns	0:49:00	2025-06-23
***	Side Stories: Darts & Farts	1:09:01	2025-06-25
***	Dogma 25th Anniversary: An Interview with Kevin Smith	1:31:42	2025-06-27
***	Side Stories: The Chatbot Made Me Do It	1:18:22	2025-07-02
625	The Toy-Box Killer: Redux Part I - Aren't We Devils?	1:43:59	2025-07-04
***	Side Stories: Mo Money Less Problems	1:07:50	2025-07-09
626	The Toy-Box Killer: Redux Part II - Storm of the Century	1:50:33	2025-07-10
***	Side Stories: Annabelle Strikes Back	1:04:52	2025-07-16
627	The Great Molasses Flood of 1919 Part I - Killer Condiments	1:02:19	2025-07-17
***	Last Update on the Left - Episode 6 - OJ Simpson Revisited	0:56:31	2025-07-21
***	Side Stories: RIP Ozzy	1:14:55	2025-07-23
***	Relaxed Fit: Too Cultish for Comfort w/ Amanda Montell	1:31:03	2025-07-25
***	Side Stories: The Burbank Butt-Sniffer	1:10:06	2025-07-30
628	The Great Molasses Flood of 1919 Part II - The Boston Molassacre	1:24:56	2025-08-01
***	Side Stories: Annabelle Airbnb	0:57:18	2025-08-06
629	The Kentucky Teenage Vampire Clan Murders Part I - The Masquerade	1:54:25	2025-08-08
***	Sovereign: An Interview with Christian Swegal	0:43:57	2025-08-11
***	Side Stories: Stories with Friends	1:21:37	2025-08-13
630	The Kentucky Teenage Vampire Clan Murders Part II - Blood & Beef	1:26:34	2025-08-15
***	Weapons: An Interview with Zach Cregger	0:42:11	2025-08-17
***	Side Stories: Resurrect-Ed	1:02:33	2025-08-20
631	Episode 631: The Kentucky Teenage Vampire Clan Murders Part III - I'm Your Parents Now	1:47:08	2025-08-22
***	Side Stories: Movie Stories IV	1:09:35	2025-08-27
632	Episode 632: Psychic Bigfoot & the Star People	1:17:32	2025-08-29
***	Side Stories: Contact in the Desert 2025 - Weaponized 2025 w/ George Knapp & Jeremy Corbell	0:48:13	2025-09-03
633	Contact in the Desert 2025: Communion - An Interview with Whitley Strieber	1:17:57	2025-09-05
***	Side Stories: Slide Stories	1:08:52	2025-09-10
634	Aaron Hernandez Part I - Worst Case Scenario	1:32:20	2025-09-12
***	Side Stories: Double Bread with Ground Beef	1:07:24	2025-09-18
635	Aaron Hernandez Part II - Inside the Meat Grinder	1:37:38	2025-09-19
***	Unbelievably Friendly Organisms: Jenna Haze	0:56:26	2025-09-22
***	Side Stories: Sandwich Stories	1:03:36	2025-09-22
636	Aaron Hernandez Part III - Fourth & Forever	1:37:38	2025-09-26
***	Good Boy: An Interview with Ben Leonberg & Indy	1:03:36	2025-09-22
***	Side Stories: The Confession	1:06:57	2025-10-01
637	Heinrich Himmler Part I - Nazi Number Two	2:04:42	2025-10-03
***	Black Phone 2: An Interview with Scott Derrickson	0:45:58	2025-10-06
***	Side Stories: One Story After Another	1:06:56	2025-10-08
638	Heinrich Himmler Part II - The Reich Stuff	2:05:21	2025-10-10
***	Dracula: An Interview with Matt Wagner & Kelley Jones	0:56:46	2025-10-06
***	Side Stories: Movie Stories V	1:11:00	2025-10-15
639	Heinrich Himmler Part III - The Dachau Spirit	1:59:43	2025-10-17
***	King Sorrow: An Interview with Joe Hill	0:49:53	2025-10-20
***	Side Stories: Heist Stories	1:12:30	2025-10-22
640	Heinrich Himmler Part IV - From Atlantis to Auschwitz	2:05:26	2025-10-24
***	Side Stories: The Haunting of Ed Larson	0:59:59	2025-10-29
641	Heinrich Himmler Part V - Einsatzgruppen Day	1:49:59	2025-10-31
***	Side Stories: CrimeWave at Sea w/ Sinisterhood	1:05:56	2025-11-05
642	Heinrich Himmler Part VI - Mein Cramps	1:49:11	2025-11-07
***	Side Stories: Law & Otter	1:14:18	2025-11-12
***	Last Update on the Left - Episode 7 - Waco: David Koresh, the Branch Davidians, and a Legacy of Rage - An Interview with Jeff Guinn	1:01:59	2025-11-14
***	Last Update on the Left - Episode 8 - The Bridgewater Triangle Re-Examined (Live at Sirius XM)	1:01:20	2025-11-14
***	Side Stories: Blowin' Bubba	0:58:10	2025-11-19
643	The Battersea Poltergeist Part I - The French Prince	1:12:46	2025-11-21
***	Predator Badlands: An Interview with Dan Trachtenberg	0:37:43	2025-11-24
***	Side Stories: Dig Me A Grave w/ Dick Harpootlian	1:12:10	2025-11-26
644	The Battersea Poltergeist Part II - Ghost Writer	1:17:34	2025-11-28
***	Side Stories: The Slenderman Escape	1:09:52	2025-12-03
645	Ronald Gene Simmons Part I - A Difficult Man	1:07:34	2025-12-05
***	Side Stories: 'Tis The Season	1:03:39	2025-12-10
646	Ronald Gene Simmons Part II - To Kill A Bunch of Mockingbirds	1:14:10	2025-12-12
***	Side Stories: The Epstein Tier List w/ Jared Logan	1:11:07	2025-12-17
647	The Horrible History of Chimney Sweeps	1:13:08	2025-12-19
***	Last Update on the Left - Episode 9 - The Unabomber	0:51:58	2025-12-24
***	Relaxed Fit: Christmas Roundup - My Favorite Things	1:18:40	2025-12-25
***	Side Stories: CTE Stories w/ Dr. Chris Nowinski	1:11:50	2025-12-31
***	Last Update on the Left - Episode 10 - Amityville Reloaded	0:53:31	2026-01-02
***	Side Stories: New Year's Evil	0:59:56	2026-01-07
***	Last Update on the Left - Episode 11 - Return to Skinwalker Ranch	0:51:46	2026-01-09
***	Side Stories: The Bone Collector	1:07:16	2026-01-14
648	Alex Murdaugh Part I - From Randy to Buster	1:30:17	2026-01-16
***	Side Stories: The Piggyback Bandit	0:58:39	2026-01-21
649	Alex Murdaugh Part II - A Legacy of Liars	1:54:53	2026-01-23
***	Side Stories: Death Pool 2026	1:11:04	2026-01-28
650	Alex Murdaugh Part III - Under The Capri Sun	2:00:24	2026-01-30
***	Side Stories: Pizza Party	1:17:36	2026-02-04
651	Bob Lazar & Area 51	2:05:39	2026-02-06
***	Side Stories: Puppy-Gate	1:08:31	2026-02-11
652	The Du Pont Foxcatcher Murder Part I - The Merchants of Death	1:32:18	2026-02-13
***	Side Stories: Man vs Moose	1:10:00	2026-02-18
653	The Du Pont Foxcatcher Murder Part II - The House of the Butterflies	1:32:50	2026-02-20
***	Side Stories: Snack Attack w/ Jackie Zebrowski	1:25:17	2026-02-25
654	Topsy the Elephant	1:26:11	2026-02-27
***	Side Stories: Shart Tank	0:58:02	2026-03-04
655	The Du Pont Foxcatcher Murder Part III - Wrestle-Mania	1:53:43	2026-03-06
***	Side Stories: Only Files w/ Jena Friedman	1:25:35	2026-03-11
656	The Dnepropetrovsk Maniacs Part I - Serial Spree	1:18:35	2026-03-13
***	Side Stories: Squatch Watch 2026	1:11:51	2026-03-18
657	The Dnepropetrovsk Maniacs Part II - 3 Guys, 1 Hammer	1:00:12	2026-03-20
***	Last Interview on the Left: Matt Bettinelli-Olpin & Tyler Gillett - Ready or Not 2: Here I Come	0:55:48	2026-03-20
***	Last Update on the Left - Episode 12 - BTK Returns w/ Katherine Ramsland	0:51:12	2026-03-23
***	Side Stories: Cornhole & Bulletholes	1:23:43	2026-03-25
***	Relaxed Fit: The 5th Annual Last Podcast On the Left March Madness of Murder	1:25:37	2026-03-27
***	Side Stories: Clavicular Criminality	1:08:04	2026-04-01
658	Jimmy Savile Part I - Clowns Get Away with Murder	2:09:05	2026-04-03
***	Side Stories: Funk Files w/ George Clinton & Danny Bedrosian	1:30:02	2026-04-08
659	Jimmy Savile Part II - The Devil Behind the Curtain	2:02:38	2026-04-10
***	Side Stories: Gilgo Guilty	1:12:33	2026-04-15
660	Jimmy Savile Part III - Built on a Lie	2:01:55	2026-04-17
***	Side Stories: On the Road	1:13:20	2026-04-22
661	The Miseducation of Ed Larson - Cryptids 101	1:18:36	2026-04-24
***	Side Stories: Dinner and a Manifesto	1:07:08	2026-04-29
662	Count Dante Part I - The Deadliest Man Alive	1:33:03	2026-05-01
***	D4vd Deep Dive	0:51:29	2026-05-06

== See also ==
- Horror podcast
- List of American crime podcasts

== Sources ==
- "Why ‘Last Podcast on the Left’ will no longer be a Spotify exclusive". The Los Angeles Times
