= Rochester High School =

Rochester High School may refer to:

- Rochester High School (Illinois), Rochester, Illinois
- Rochester High School (Michigan), Rochester, Michigan
- Rochester High School (Vermont), Rochester, Vermont
- Rochester High School (Washington), Rochester, Washington
- Rochester Adams High School, Rochester, Michigan
- Rochester Area High School (Pennsylvania), Rochester, Pennsylvania
- Rochester Area Learning Center, Rochester, Minnesota
- Rochester Community High School, Rochester, Indiana
- Rochester Off-Campus Charter High School, Rochester, Minnesota
- Old Rochester Regional High School, Mattapoisett, Massachusetts
- Aquinas Institute of Rochester, Rochester, New York
- East Rochester Junior-Senior High School, East Rochester, New York
