= Greater Rochester =

Greater Rochester can refer to

- Greater Rochester International Airport, serving Rochester, New York
- Rochester, New York metropolitan area
- Rochester, Minnesota metropolitan area
