= Rochester School District (Washington) =

School district in Washington, United States

Rochester School District 401

Address
- 10140 US Highway 12 SW; Rochester, WA 98579 Thurston County, Washington United States

District information
- Grades: PK–12
- Superintendent: Justin Black
- Enrollment: 2,161 (2025)

Rochester School District No. 401 (RSD) is a public school district in Grays Harbor, Lewis, and Thurston counties, Washington, United States.

In the 2025–26 school year, Rochester School District had a student enrollment of 2,161.

== Location ==
Rochester School District No. 401 covers 105 square miles (271.9 km^{2}) of land in southwestern Thurston County, part of northwestern Lewis County, and a small portion of southeastern Grays Harbor County.

== History ==
=== Establishment ===
On June 1, 1942, voters approved the consolidation of Gate School District No. 9, Grand Mound School District No. 22, Riverside School District No. 24, Meadow School District No. 46, Independance School District No. 230 of Lewis County, and Rochester School District No. 330 at a special election, forming Rochester School District No. 401 on July 1, 1942, becoming the second joint school district in Thurston County. All component districts that consolidated to form School District No. 402 were previously participants in Rochester Union High School District No. 202, which allowed pupils from any district to attend high school in Rochester. After the consolidation, the union high school district was dissolved.

- On April 6, 1923, voters approved the consolidation of Mima School District No. 20, Rochester School District No. 41, and Jamestown School District No. 60 at a special election, forming Rochester School District No. 310 on July 1, 1923. Depending on the source, Rhodes School District No. 21 may also have been a part of this consolidation.
- By 1927, the area encompassed by the former Chehalis School District No. 38 had been included within Rochester School District No. 310, suggesting that the district had consolidated or annexed into the Rochester School District previously. Upon its formation, School District No. 38 extended 2 miles east from the Thurston-Grays Harbor county line, bounded by the Black River to the north and the Chehalis River to the south.
- On September 6, 1941, voters approved the consolidation of Bordeaux School District No. 67 and Rochester School District No. 310 at a special election, forming Rochester School District No. 330.

== Schools ==
Elementary schools
Name	Grade levels	Established	Enrollment (2025–26)	Mascot
Rochester	PK–2	1936	489	Warrior
Grand Mound	3-5	1922	279	Warrior

Middle schools
Name	Grade levels	Established	Enrollment (2025–26)	Mascot
Rochester	6-8	1950's	507	Warrior

High schools
Name	Grade levels	Established	Enrollment (2025–26)	Mascot	WIAA classification
Rochester	9-12	1989	626	Warrior	1A
