= Rochester, Texas =

Town in Texas, United States

- Town
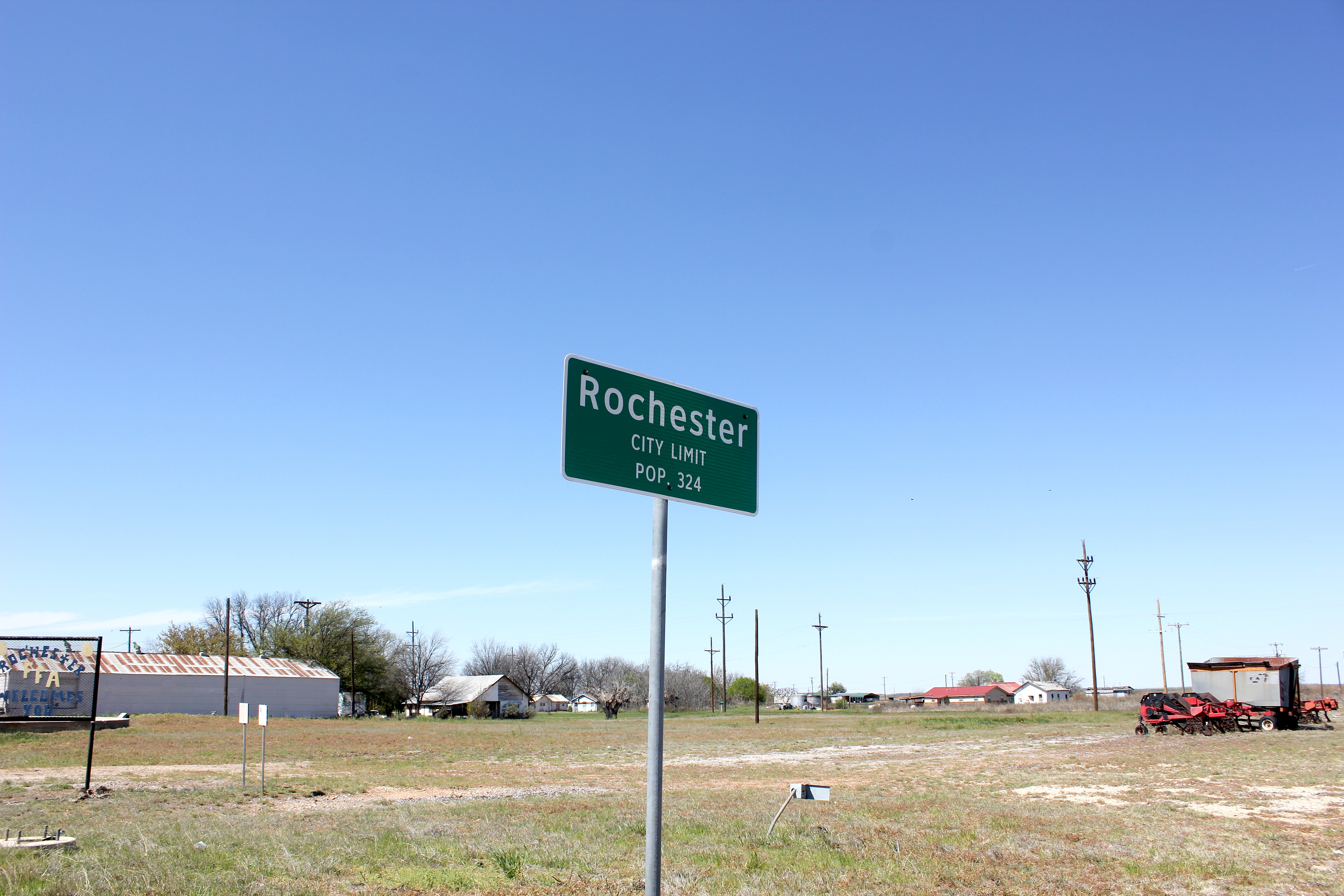

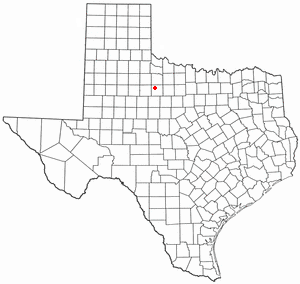
- Location of Rochester, Texas

- Coordinates: 33°18′51″N 99°51′23″W
- Country: United States
- State: Texas
- County: Haskell
- Founded: 1906; 120 years ago

Area
  - Total: 0.34 sq mi (0.88 km^{2})
  - Land: 0.34 sq mi (0.88 km^{2})
  - Water: 0 sq mi (0.00 km^{2})
- Elevation: 1,595 ft (486 m)

Population (2020)
  - Total: 248
  - Density: 730/sq mi (280/km^{2})
- Time zone: UTC-6 (Central (CST))
  - Summer (DST): UTC-5 (CDT)
- ZIP code: 79544
- Area code: 940
- FIPS code: 48-62636
- GNIS feature ID: 2412559

Rochester is a town in northwestern Haskell County, Texas, United States. The population was 248 at the 2020 census, down from 324 at the 2010 census.

== History ==
Rochester was founded by A. B. Carothers in 1906 as the Kansas City, Mexico and Orient Railway was built in the area. It takes its name from Rochester, New York.

== Geography ==
Rochester is in northwestern Haskell County along Texas State Highway 6, which leads north 7 miles (11 km) to Knox City and south 9 miles (14 km) to Rule. Haskell, the county seat, is 15 miles (24 km) to the southeast. According to the United States Census Bureau, Rochester has a total area of 0.3 square miles (0.9 km^{2}), all land.

== Demographics ==
Historical population
Census	Pop.	Note	%±
1930	562		—
1940	611		8.7%
1950	773		26.5%
1960	625		−19.1%
1970	529		−15.4%
1980	492		−7.0%
1990	458		−6.9%
2000	378		−17.5%
2010	324		−14.3%
2020	248		−23.5%
U.S. Decennial Census; 2020 Census

As of the census of 2000, 378 people, 155 households, and 106 families resided in the town. The population density was 1,076.0 inhabitants per square mile (415.4/km^{2}). The 191 housing units averaged 543.7 per square mile (210.7/km^{2}). The racial makeup of the town was 65.34% White, 7.14% African American, 1.06% Native American, 24.07% from other races, and 2.38% from two or more races. Hispanics or Latinos of any race were 38.62% of the population.

Of the 155 households, 29.0% had children under the age of 18 living with them, 51.6% were married couples living together, 13.5% had a female householder with no husband present, and 31.6% were not families. About 30.3% of all households were made up of individuals, and 18.7% had someone living alone who was 65 years of age or older. The average household size was 2.44 and the average family size was 3.04.

In the town, the population was distributed as 25.9% under the age of 18, 8.2% from 18 to 24, 24.6% from 25 to 44, 19.8% from 45 to 64, and 21.4% who were 65 years of age or older. The median age was 39 years. For every 100 females, there were 96.9 males. For every 100 females age 18 and over, there were 95.8 males.

The median income for a household in the town was $20,357, and for a family was $25,893. Males had a median income of $17,188 versus $16,250 for females. The per capita income for the town was $12,912. About 24.2% of families and 29.4% of the population were below the poverty line, including 46.8% of those under age 18 and 20.8% of those age 65 or over.

== Education ==
The Haskell Consolidated Independent School District operates public schools serving the community.

From the early 1900s to 2005, the single-campus Rochester Independent School District served the community. The high school was completed in 1938, and had served in that capacity until May 2005. Due to rapidly declining enrollment, the district, now named Rochester-County Line Independent School District, merged with Haskell CISD on June 1, 2005.

During consolidation, some children transferred to Knox City and Rule schools.

== Notable people ==
- Marcus Parks, host of The Last Podcast on the Left
