= Rochester High School (Washington) =

Location
- 19800 Carper Rd SW; Rochester, Washington 98579; United States

Information
- Type: Public secondary
- Established: 1989
- School district: Rochester School District
- Principal: Kevin Theonnes
- Teaching staff: 31.71 (FTE)
- Grades: 9–12
- Enrollment: 600 (2023-2024)
- Student to teacher ratio: 18.92
- Campus: Rural
- Colors: Blue & Gold
- Mascot: Warriors
- Website: rhs.rochester.wednet.edu/o/rhs

Rochester High School is a public high school in Rochester, Washington. It is part of the Rochester School District and serves a rural area of Thurston County. The main building is around 66,000 square feet (6,100 m^{2}).

== Sports ==
Rochester competes in WIAA Class 1A, and is a member of the 1A Evergreen League in District Four. School sponsored sports include; Football, Baseball, Basketball, Soccer, Wrestling, Tennis, Cross Country, Track and Field, Golf, Swimming, Fastpitch, Volleyball, and girls Bowling.

Rochester maintains a rivalry with Tenino High School, known as the Scatter Creek Showdown.

=== State championships ===
- Baseball: 1993, 1995, 2008
