= John Rochester =

John Rochester may refer to:

- John Rochester (martyr) (c. 1498–1537), English Catholic priest
- John Rochester (politician) (1822–1894), Canadian industrialist and politician
- John Wilmot, 2nd Earl of Rochester (1647–1680)

== See also ==
- John Fisher, Bishop of Rochester
