= Rochester Independent School District =

Former school district in Texas

Rochester Independent School District was a public school district based in Rochester, Texas (United States). It existed from the early 1900s to 2005. From 2002 to 2005, the district was known as the Rochester County Line Independent School District.

The district consisted of a single campus - Rochester School - that served students in grades pre-kindergarten through twelve. It was located in northwestern Haskell County and included a small portion of extreme northeastern Stonewall County.

After voters approved a consolidation, the district was merged into the Haskell Consolidated Independent School District, which took on $1 million in debt from the Rochester district.

== District enrollment ==
- 1990-91 - 177 students
- 1995-96 - 169 students
- 2000-01 - 132 students
- 2004-05 - 40 students

The ethnic composition of students in the 2004-2005 school year was 20 White (50%), 18 Hispanic (45%), and 2 African American (5%). Of the 40 students, 33 (82.5%) were considered economically disadvantaged.

== Student performance ==
Rochester ISD's performance on the Texas Assessment of Academic Skills (TAAS), a state standardized test used from 1991 to 2003, was generally above state standards. The district received the highest rating of "exemplary" on four occasions (1997–98, 1998–99, 1999-00, and 2000–01) and the second highest rating of "recognized" four times (1995–96, 1996–97, 2001–02, and 2002–03).

A new standardized test, the Texas Assessment of Knowledge and Skills (TAKS) was introduced in 2003. Rochester received a rating of "academically acceptable" for the 2003–04 and 2004-05 school years.

== Consolidation ==
The district merged with the larger Haskell Consolidated Independent School District in 2005. The Rochester campus became Rochester Junior High, serving the district's seventh and eighth graders.
