= Rochester Township =

Rochester Township may refer to:

== Canada ==
- Rochester Township, now part of Lakeshore, Ontario

== United States ==
- Rochester Township, Sangamon County, Illinois
- Rochester Township, Fulton County, Indiana
- Rochester Township, Cedar County, Iowa
- Rochester Township, Kingman County, Kansas
- Rochester Township, Olmsted County, Minnesota
- Rochester Township, Andrew County, Missouri
- Rochester Township, Cass County, North Dakota, in Cass County, North Dakota
- Rochester Township, Lorain County, Ohio
- Rochester Township, Beaver County, Pennsylvania
