= East Rochester =

East Rochester is the name of the following places in the United States:

- East Rochester, New Hampshire, a village in the city of Rochester
- East Rochester, New York, a coterminous town and village
- East Rochester, Ohio, an unincorporated community and census-designated place
- East Rochester, Pennsylvania, a borough
