= List of counties in New Mexico =

Counties of New Mexico
- Location: State of New Mexico
- Number: 33
- Populations: 617 (Harding) – 667,601 (Bernalillo)
- Areas: 109 square miles (280 km^{2}) (Los Alamos) – 6,928 square miles (17,940 km^{2}) (Catron)
- Government: County government
- Subdivisions: cities, towns, townships, unincorporated communities, indian reservations, Pueblo, census-designated places

There are 33 counties in the U.S. state of New Mexico.

The New Mexico Territory was organized in September 1850. The first nine counties in the territory to be created, in 1852, were Bernalillo, Doña Ana, Rio Arriba, San Miguel, Santa Ana, Santa Fe, Socorro, Taos, and Valencia Counties. Mora County was created in 1860. Following the Gadsden Purchase of 1853–1854, the northeasternmost part of the New Mexico Territory was ceded to the new Colorado Territory in February 1861, before the western half was reorganized as the Arizona Territory in February 1863, establishing New Mexico's present-day boundaries.

Grant County was created in 1868, followed by Colfax and Lincoln Counties in 1869. In 1876, Santa Ana County was absorbed by Bernalillo County. A further 14 counties were then created between 1884 and 1909, bringing the total number to 26.

New Mexico was admitted to the Union as the 47th state on January 6, 1912. De Baca and Lea Counties were created in 1917, followed by Hidalgo County in 1920 and Catron and Harding Counties in 1921. Los Alamos County was created in 1949 and finally Cibola County in 1981, bringing the total number of counties to 33.

The Federal Information Processing Standard (FIPS) code, which is used by the United States government to uniquely identify states and counties, is provided with each entry. New Mexico's code is 35, which when combined with any county code would be written as 35XXX. The FIPS code for each county links to census data for that county.

== List ==
For comparison, the population estimate for the state of New Mexico as of July 2025 was 2,125,498, and the area was 121,589 mi^{2} (315,194 km^{2}).

| County | FIPS code | County seat | Est. | Origin | Etymology | Population | Area | Map |
|---|---|---|---|---|---|---|---|---|
| Bernalillo County | 001 | Albuquerque | September 22, 1846 | One of the nine original counties. | The Gonzales-Bernal family, Spanish nobles who settled the territory in the seventeenth century | 667,601 | 1,166 sq mi (3,020 km^{2}) | State map highlighting Bernalillo County |
| Catron County | 003 | Reserve | July 1, 1921 | Part of Socorro County. | Thomas Benton Catron (1840–1921), a Santa Fe attorney and New Mexico's first U.S. Senator | 3,827 | 6,928 sq mi (17,943 km^{2}) | State map highlighting Catron County |
| Chaves County | 005 | Roswell | January 1, 1891 | Part of Lincoln County. | Jose Francisco Chaves (1833–1904), a U.S. Army colonel in New Mexico during and after the Civil War | 63,364 | 6,071 sq mi (15,724 km^{2}) | State map highlighting Chaves County |
| Cibola County | 006 | Grants | March 17, 1981 | Parts of Valencia County, Socorro County, McKinley County, and Catron County. | The mythical Seven Cities of Cibola | 26,807 | 4,540 sq mi (11,759 km^{2}) | State map highlighting Cibola County |
| Colfax County | 007 | Raton | January 25, 1869 | Part of Mora County. | Schuyler Colfax (1823–1885), the seventeenth vice president of the United States | 12,184 | 3,757 sq mi (9,731 km^{2}) | State map highlighting Colfax County |
| Curry County | 009 | Clovis | February 25, 1909 | Parts of Quay County and Roosevelt County. | George Curry (1861–1947), a governor of New Mexico Territory from 1907 to 1910 | 46,655 | 1,406 sq mi (3,642 km^{2}) | State map highlighting Curry County |
| De Baca County | 011 | Fort Sumner | June 8, 1917 | Parts of Chaves County and Guadalupe County. | Ezequiel Cabeza de Baca (1864–1917), the second state governor of New Mexico | 1,647 | 2,325 sq mi (6,022 km^{2}) | State map highlighting De Baca County |
| Doña Ana County | 013 | Las Cruces | January 9, 1852 | One of the nine original counties. | Doña Ana Robledo, a seventeenth-century Spanish woman known for her charitable giving to the native population | 229,091 | 3,807 sq mi (9,860 km^{2}) | State map highlighting Doña Ana County |
| Eddy County | 015 | Carlsbad | January 1, 1891 | Part of Lincoln County. | Charles Eddy (1857–1931), a rancher and developer of the area | 62,509 | 4,182 sq mi (10,831 km^{2}) | State map highlighting Eddy County |
| Grant County | 017 | Silver City | January 30, 1868 | Part of Doña Ana County. | Ulysses Simpson Grant (1822–1885), the Civil War general and eighteenth president of the United States | 27,252 | 3,966 sq mi (10,272 km^{2}) | State map highlighting Grant County |
| Guadalupe County | 019 | Santa Rosa | March 16, 1903 | Part of San Miguel County. | Our Lady of Guadalupe, the patron saint of the Americas | 4,343 | 3,031 sq mi (7,850 km^{2}) | State map highlighting Guadalupe County |
| Harding County | 021 | Mosquero | June 10, 1921 | Parts of Mora County and Union County. | Warren Gamaliel Harding (1865–1923), the twenty-ninth president of the United States | 617 | 2,126 sq mi (5,506 km^{2}) | State map highlighting Harding County |
| Hidalgo County | 023 | Lordsburg | January 1, 1920 | Part of Grant County. | The Treaty of Guadalupe Hidalgo, named after a Mexican town in turn named for Miguel Hidalgo y Costilla (1753 - 1811), the priest who is known as the "Father of Mexican Independence" | 3,929 | 3,446 sq mi (8,925 km^{2}) | State map highlighting Hidalgo County |
| Lea County | 025 | Lovington | June 8, 1917 | Parts of Chaves County and Eddy County. | Joseph Calloway Lea (1841–1904), a captain in the U.S. Army and the founder of the New Mexico Military Academy | 74,749 | 4,393 sq mi (11,378 km^{2}) | State map highlighting Lea County |
| Lincoln County | 027 | Carrizozo | January 16, 1869 | Part of Socorro County. | Abraham Lincoln (1809–1865), the sixteenth president of the United States | 19,844 | 4,831 sq mi (12,512 km^{2}) | State map highlighting Lincoln County |
| Los Alamos County | 028 | Los Alamos | March 16, 1949 | Parts of Sandoval County and Santa Fe County. | Named for its county seat of Los Alamos, New Mexico, which itself is the Spanish name for the cottonwood tree | 19,407 | 109 sq mi (282 km^{2}) | State map highlighting Los Alamos County |
| Luna County | 029 | Deming | March 16, 1901 | Parts of Doña Ana County and Grant County. | Solomon Luna (1858–1912), the largest land owner in the county at the time of its creation; itself Spanish for "moon" | 25,407 | 2,965 sq mi (7,679 km^{2}) | State map highlighting Luna County |
| McKinley County | 031 | Gallup | January 1, 1901 | Part of Bernalillo County. | William McKinley (1843–1901), the twenty-fifth president of the United States | 68,119 | 5,449 sq mi (14,113 km^{2}) | State map highlighting McKinley County |
| Mora County | 033 | Mora | February 1, 1860 | Part of Taos County. | Named for its county seat of Mora, New Mexico, which is itself named after lo de mora, the Spanish term for "blackberry" | 4,051 | 1,931 sq mi (5,001 km^{2}) | State map highlighting Mora County |
| Otero County | 035 | Alamogordo | January 30, 1899 | Parts of Doña Ana County and Lincoln County. | Miguel A. Otero (1829-1882), territorial delegate to U. S. Congress or Miguel Antonio Otero (II) (1859–1944), 16th Governor of New Mexico Territory from 1897 to 1906 | 70,368 | 6,627 sq mi (17,164 km^{2}) | State map highlighting Otero County |
| Quay County | 037 | Tucumcari | February 28, 1903 | Part of Guadalupe County. | Matthew Stanley Quay (1833–1904), a U.S. Senator from Pennsylvania who supported New Mexico's statehood | 8,454 | 2,855 sq mi (7,394 km^{2}) | State map highlighting Quay County |
| Rio Arriba County | 039 | Tierra Amarilla | September 22, 1846 | One of the nine original counties. | Named for its location on the upper Rio Grande (Río Arriba means "upstream" or "up the river" in Spanish) | 39,832 | 5,858 sq mi (15,172 km^{2}) | State map highlighting Rio Arriba County |
| Roosevelt County | 041 | Portales | February 28, 1903 | Parts of Chaves County and Guadalupe County. | Theodore Roosevelt (1858–1919), the twenty-sixth president of the United States | 18,615 | 2,449 sq mi (6,343 km^{2}) | State map highlighting Roosevelt County |
| Sandoval County | 043 | Bernalillo | April 14, 1903 | Part of Bernalillo County. | Named for the Sandoval family, prominent seventeenth-century Spanish landowners | 159,565 | 3,710 sq mi (9,609 km^{2}) | State map highlighting Sandoval County |
| San Juan County | 045 | Aztec | February 24, 1887 | Part of Rio Arriba County. | San Juan River, itself named after the Catholic saint | 120,340 | 5,514 sq mi (14,281 km^{2}) | State map highlighting San Juan County |
| San Miguel County | 047 | Las Vegas | September 22, 1846 | One of the nine original counties. | San Miguel de Bado Catholic Church, the first in the area | 26,260 | 4,717 sq mi (12,217 km^{2}) | State map highlighting San Miguel County |
| Santa Fe County | 049 | Santa Fe | September 22, 1846 | One of the nine original counties. | Named after the city of Santa Fe whose full Spanish name is “La Villa Real de la Santa Fe de San Francisco de Assisi” or “The royal city of the holy faith of St. Francis of Assisi” | 156,907 | 1,909 sq mi (4,944 km^{2}) | State map highlighting Santa Fe County |
| Sierra County | 051 | Truth or Consequences | April 3, 1884 | Parts of Doña Ana County and Socorro County. | Possibly named for the Black Range. (Sierra is "mountain range" in Spanish.) | 11,395 | 4,180 sq mi (10,826 km^{2}) | State map highlighting Sierra County |
| Socorro County | 053 | Socorro | January 9, 1852 | One of the nine original counties. | Spanish term meaning "aid," which refers to the help Native Americans gave to starving travelers | 15,838 | 6,647 sq mi (17,216 km^{2}) | State map highlighting Socorro County |
| Taos County | 055 | Taos | September 22, 1846 | One of the nine original counties. | Named for its county seat of Taos, New Mexico, which in turn was named for the nearby Taos Pueblo, an ancient Native American village. Taos is "red willow" in the Tiwa language | 34,564 | 2,203 sq mi (5,706 km^{2}) | State map highlighting Taos County |
| Torrance County | 057 | Estancia | January 1, 1905 | Parts of Bernalillo County, Valencia County, and Socorro County. | Francis J. Torrance (1859–1919), the developer of the New Mexico Central Railroad | 16,100 | 3,345 sq mi (8,664 km^{2}) | State map highlighting Torrance County |
| Union County | 059 | Clayton | January 1, 1894 | Parts of Colfax County, Mora County and San Miguel County. | Named for the "union" of the three counties which donated land to form the new county | 3,844 | 3,830 sq mi (9,920 km^{2}) | State map highlighting Union County |
| Valencia County | 061 | Los Lunas | September 22, 1846 | One of the nine original counties. | Named for the town of Valencia, New Mexico, which is itself named for Valencia, Spain | 82,013 | 1,068 sq mi (2,766 km^{2}) | State map highlighting Valencia County |

== Racial / Ethnic Profile of counties in New Mexico (2020 Census) ==
Racial / Ethnic Profile of counties in New Mexico (2020 Census)
Following is a table of counties in New Mexico by race/ethnicity. The majority racial/ethnic group is coded per the key below.

| Majority minority with no dominant group |
| Majority White |
| Majority Black |
| Majority Hispanic |
| Majority Asian |
| Majority Native American |

Racial and ethnic composition of counties in New Mexico (2020 Census) (NH = Non-Hispanic) Note: the US Census treats Hispanic/Latino as an ethnic category. This table excludes Latinos from the racial categories and assigns them to a separate category. Hispanics/Latinos may be of any race.
| County | Location of County | Total Population | White alone (NH) | % | Black or African American alone (NH) | % | Native American or Alaska Native alone (NH) | % | Asian alone (NH) | % | Pacific Islander alone (NH) | % | Other race alone (NH) | % | Mixed race or Multiracial (NH) | % | Hispanic or Latino (any race) | % |
|---|---|---|---|---|---|---|---|---|---|---|---|---|---|---|---|---|---|---|
| Bernalillo | | 676,444 | 253,355 | 37.45% | 17,871 | 2.64% | 30,628 | 4.53% | 19,226 | 2.84% | 564 | 0.08% | 3,505 | 0.52% | 21,814 | 3.22% | 329,481 | 48.71% |
| Catron | | 3,579 | 2,738 | 76.50% | 35 | 0.98% | 47 | 1.31% | 8 | 0.22% | 0 | 0.00% | 37 | 1.03% | 112 | 3.13% | 602 | 16.82% |
| Chaves | | 65,157 | 24,445 | 37.52% | 947 | 1.45% | 411 | 0.63% | 611 | 0.94% | 29 | 0.04% | 258 | 0.40% | 1,359 | 2.09% | 37,097 | 56.93% |
| Cibola | | 27,172 | 5,538 | 20.38% | 254 | 0.93% | 11,767 | 43.31% | 201 | 0.74% | 7 | 0.03% | 196 | 0.72% | 565 | 2.08% | 8,644 | 31.81% |
| Colfax | | 12,387 | 5,954 | 48.07% | 25 | 0.20% | 108 | 0.87% | 60 | 0.48% | 11 | 0.09% | 39 | 0.31% | 312 | 2.52% | 5,878 | 47.45% |
| Curry | | 48,430 | 21,052 | 43.47% | 2,513 | 5.19% | 249 | 0.51% | 733 | 1.51% | 35 | 0.07% | 211 | 0.44% | 1,841 | 3.80% | 21,796 | 45.01% |
| De Baca | | 1,698 | 983 | 57.89% | 3 | 0.18% | 4 | 0.24% | 4 | 0.24% | 4 | 0.24% | 0 | 0.00% | 46 | 2.71% | 654 | 38.52% |
| Doña Ana | | 219,561 | 59,749 | 27.21% | 3,172 | 1.44% | 1,463 | 0.67% | 2,458 | 1.12% | 115 | 0.05% | 839 | 0.38% | 4,093 | 1.86% | 147,672 | 67.26% |
| Eddy | | 62,314 | 27,139 | 43.55% | 791 | 1.27% | 518 | 0.83% | 578 | 0.93% | 43 | 0.07% | 404 | 0.65% | 1,534 | 2.46% | 31,307 | 50.24% |
| Grant | | 28,185 | 13,117 | 46.54% | 249 | 0.88% | 265 | 0.94% | 191 | 0.68% | 18 | 0.06% | 168 | 0.60% | 711 | 2.52% | 13,466 | 47.78% |
| Guadalupe | | 4,452 | 769 | 17.27% | 64 | 1.44% | 40 | 0.90% | 49 | 1.10% | 0 | 0.00% | 21 | 0.47% | 73 | 1.64% | 3,436 | 77.18% |
| Harding | | 657 | 352 | 53.58% | 2 | 0.30% | 0 | 0.00% | 0 | 0.00% | 0 | 0.00% | 1 | 0.15% | 20 | 3.04% | 282 | 42.92% |
| Hidalgo | | 4,178 | 1,645 | 39.37% | 14 | 0.34% | 14 | 0.34% | 11 | 0.26% | 5 | 0.12% | 28 | 0.67% | 71 | 1.70% | 2,390 | 57.20% |
| Lea | | 74,455 | 23,775 | 31.93% | 2,497 | 3.35% | 477 | 0.64% | 636 | 0.85% | 21 | 0.03% | 294 | 0.39% | 1,562 | 2.10% | 45,193 | 60.70% |
| Lincoln | | 20,269 | 12,339 | 60.88% | 68 | 0.34% | 429 | 2.12% | 138 | 0.68% | 8 | 0.04% | 137 | 0.68% | 654 | 3.23% | 6,496 | 32.05% |
| Los Alamos | | 19,419 | 13,446 | 69.24% | 157 | 0.81% | 116 | 0.60% | 1,223 | 6.30% | 15 | 0.08% | 138 | 0.71% | 889 | 4.58% | 3,435 | 17.69% |
| Luna | | 25,427 | 7,671 | 30.17% | 228 | 0.90% | 143 | 0.56% | 160 | 0.63% | 12 | 0.05% | 50 | 0.20% | 493 | 1.94% | 16,670 | 65.56% |
| McKinley | | 72,902 | 5,946 | 8.16% | 323 | 0.44% | 55,401 | 75.99% | 935 | 1.28% | 34 | 0.05% | 127 | 0.17% | 1,525 | 2.09% | 8,611 | 11.81% |
| Mora | | 4,189 | 764 | 18.24% | 10 | 0.24% | 22 | 0.53% | 14 | 0.33% | 0 | 0.00% | 10 | 0.24% | 68 | 1.62% | 3,301 | 78.80% |
| Otero | | 67,839 | 30,931 | 45.59% | 2,299 | 3.39% | 4,173 | 6.15% | 1,001 | 1.48% | 145 | 0.21% | 377 | 0.56% | 2,761 | 4.07% | 26,152 | 38.55% |
| Quay | | 8,746 | 4,434 | 50.70% | 89 | 1.02% | 57 | 0.65% | 48 | 0.55% | 2 | 0.02% | 36 | 0.41% | 232 | 2.65% | 3,848 | 44.00% |
| Rio Arriba | | 40,363 | 5,945 | 14.73% | 160 | 0.40% | 6,135 | 15.20% | 233 | 0.58% | 5 | 0.01% | 184 | 0.46% | 542 | 1.34% | 27,159 | 67.29% |
| Roosevelt | | 19,191 | 9,328 | 48.61% | 443 | 2.31% | 163 | 0.85% | 173 | 0.90% | 18 | 0.09% | 114 | 0.59% | 555 | 2.89% | 8,397 | 43.75% |
| Sandoval | | 148,834 | 63,426 | 42.62% | 2,823 | 1.90% | 16,891 | 11.35% | 2,320 | 1.56% | 166 | 0.11% | 679 | 0.46% | 4,912 | 3.30% | 57,617 | 38.71% |
| San Juan | | 121,661 | 43,583 | 35.82% | 554 | 0.46% | 48,413 | 39.79% | 872 | 0.72% | 67 | 0.06% | 454 | 0.37% | 4,088 | 3.36% | 23,630 | 19.42% |
| San Miguel | | 27,201 | 5,447 | 20.02% | 264 | 0.97% | 278 | 1.02% | 132 | 0.49% | 2 | 0.01% | 132 | 0.49% | 456 | 1.68% | 20,490 | 75.33% |
| Santa Fe | | 154,823 | 67,861 | 43.83% | 1,221 | 0.79% | 3,869 | 2.50% | 2,238 | 1.45% | 72 | 0.05% | 969 | 0.63% | 4,216 | 2.72% | 74,377 | 48.04% |
| Sierra | | 11,576 | 7,507 | 64.85% | 70 | 0.60% | 106 | 0.92% | 119 | 1.03% | 3 | 0.03% | 31 | 0.27% | 429 | 3.71% | 3,311 | 28.60% |
| Socorro | | 16,595 | 5,361 | 32.30% | 121 | 0.73% | 1,946 | 11.73% | 295 | 1.78% | 8 | 0.05% | 75 | 0.45% | 436 | 2.63% | 8,353 | 50.33% |
| Taos | | 34,489 | 13,706 | 39.74% | 130 | 0.38% | 1,830 | 5.31% | 196 | 0.57% | 4 | 0.01% | 274 | 0.79% | 919 | 2.66% | 17,430 | 50.54% |
| Torrance | | 15,045 | 7,761 | 51.59% | 121 | 0.80% | 237 | 1.58% | 51 | 0.34% | 2 | 0.01% | 90 | 0.60% | 518 | 3.44% | 6,265 | 41.64% |
| Union | | 4,079 | 2,234 | 54.77% | 65 | 1.59% | 57 | 1.40% | 6 | 0.15% | 4 | 0.10% | 15 | 0.37% | 102 | 2.50% | 1,596 | 39.13% |
| Valencia | | 76,205 | 24,651 | 32.35% | 747 | 0.98% | 2,353 | 3.09% | 341 | 0.45% | 32 | 0.04% | 447 | 0.59% | 1,859 | 2.44% | 45,775 | 60.07% |

== Former counties ==
- Arizona County, New Mexico Territory, is mentioned in the 1860 United States census.
- Mesilla County, appears on 1860s-era territorial map encompassing area in present-day Dona Aña, Grant, Hidalgo, Luna, Sierra west of the Rio Grande
- Santa Ana County (1844–1876) absorbed by Bernalillo County; portions are in present-day McKinley County
- Santa Fe County, Texas (1848–1850), never organized, included the portion of New Mexico east of the Rio Grande except for southeastern New Mexico east of the Pecos River and south of the Prairie Dog Town Fork Red River as well as the Trans-Pecos and most of the Panhandle regions of Texas, the Oklahoma Panhandle, and portions of Colorado, Kansas, and Wyoming. Before Texas ceded its western lands to the federal government after the Compromise of 1850, the following counties were briefly created from Santa Fe County earlier that year in south-central New Mexico between the Rio Grande and the Pecos:
  - El Paso County, Texas
  - Worth County, Texas
