= List of counties in Texas =

Counties of Texas
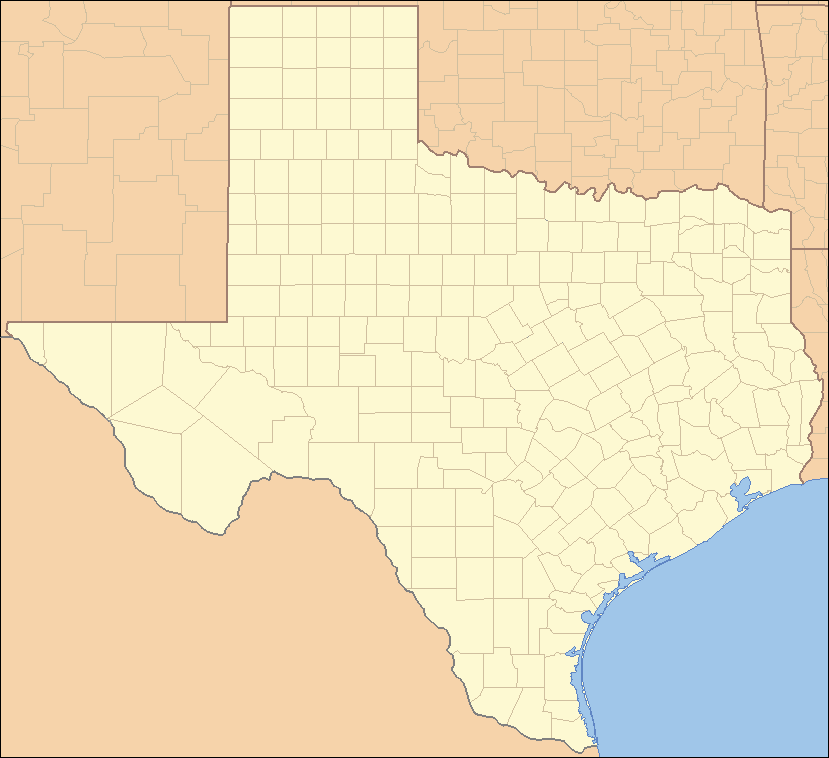
- Location: State of Texas
- Number: 254
- Populations: 52 (Loving) – 5,045,026 (Harris)
- Areas: 149 square miles (390 km^{2}) (Rockwall) – 6,192 square miles (16,040 km^{2}) (Brewster)
- Government: County government
- Subdivisions: Precinct

Texas Counties and municipalities

The U.S. state of Texas is divided into 254 counties, more than any other U.S. state. While only about 20% of Texas counties are generally located within the Houston—Dallas—San Antonio—Austin areas, they serve a majority of the state's population with approximately 22,000,000 inhabitants.

Texas was originally divided into municipalities (municipios in Spanish), a unit of local government under Spanish and Mexican rule. When the Republic of Texas gained its independence in 1836, the 23 municipalities became the original Texas counties. Many of these were later divided into new counties. The last county to be initially created was Kenedy County in 1921, but Loving County is the newest organized county; it was first organized in 1893 in an apparent scheme to defraud, abolished in 1897, then reorganized in 1931. Most of these recent counties, especially near the northwest, were created from Bexar County during the 1870s.

Each county is run by a commissioners' court, consisting of four elected commissioners (one from each of four precincts drawn based on population) and a county judge elected from all the voters of the county. In smaller counties, the county judge actually does perform judicial duties, but in larger counties, the county judge functions as the county's chief executive officer. Certain officials, such as the sheriff and tax collector, are elected separately by the voters, but the commissioners' court determines their office budgets, and sets overall county policy. All county elections are partisan; the one exception is the board of trustees of the Dallas County department of education (the Harris County trustees were elected on a nonpartisan basis until 1984).

While the counties have eminent domain power and control all unincorporated land within their boundaries, they have neither home-rule authority nor zoning power. The county is responsible for providing essential services (except for fire and ambulance, which are often supplied by volunteer fire departments). Unlike other US states, Texas does not allow for consolidated city-county governments. Cities and counties (as well as other political entities) are permitted to enter "interlocal agreements" to share services (as an example, a city and a school district may enter into agreements with the county whereby the county bills for and collects property taxes for the city and school district; thus, only one tax bill is sent instead of three). School districts are independent of county and city government (with the exception of the Stafford Municipal School District, which is city controlled).

The Federal Information Processing Standard (FIPS) code, which is used by the United States government to uniquely identify states and counties, is provided with each entry. Texas's code is 48, which when combined with any county code would be written in the form of 48XXX. The FIPS code for each county in the table links to census data for that county.

== List ==
County	FIPS code	County seat	Est.	Origin	Etymology	Population	Area	Map
Anderson County	001	Palestine	March 24, 1846	Houston County	Kenneth Lewis Anderson (1805–1845), the last vice president of the Republic of Texas	59,805	1,071 sq mi (2,774 km^{2})	State map highlighting Anderson County
Andrews County	003	Andrews	November 19, 1876	Bexar County	Richard Andrews (1800–1835), the first Texan soldier to die in the Texas Revolution	18,914	1,501 sq mi (3,888 km^{2})	State map highlighting Andrews County
Angelina County	005	Lufkin	April 22, 1846	Nacogdoches County	A Hainai Native American woman who assisted early Spanish missionaries, whom they called "Little Angel" (Spanish:Angelina)	88,154	802 sq mi (2,077 km^{2})	State map highlighting Angelina County
Aransas County	007	Rockport	September 30, 1871	Refugio County	Aransas Bay, named in turn for an early Spanish fort; this support was supposedly named in turn for a Spanish palace Aránzazu, possibly related to the Sanctuario de Aránzazu. (Arantzazu is Basque for "place of thorns")	26,146	252 sq mi (653 km^{2})	State map highlighting Aransas County
Archer County	009	Archer City	January 22, 1858	Fannin County	Branch Tanner Archer, a commissioner for the Republic of Texas	9,129	910 sq mi (2,357 km^{2})	State map highlighting Archer County
Armstrong County	011	Claude	November 19, 1876	Bexar County	One of several Texas pioneer families, although it is not certain which one	1,843	914 sq mi (2,367 km^{2})	State map highlighting Armstrong County
Atascosa County	013	Jourdanton	January 25, 1856	Bexar County	The Spanish word for "boggy"	53,590	1,232 sq mi (3,191 km^{2})	State map highlighting Atascosa County
Austin County	015	Bellville	February 12, 1828	One of the original 23 counties	Stephen F. Austin (1793–1836), known as the Father of Texas	33,625	653 sq mi (1,691 km^{2})	State map highlighting Austin County
Bailey County	017	Muleshoe	November 19, 1876	Bexar County	Peter James Bailey III, a soldier and defender of the Alamo	6,963	827 sq mi (2,142 km^{2})	State map highlighting Bailey County
Bandera County	019	Bandera	January 26, 1856	Bexar County	Bandera Pass, named in turn for the Spanish word for "flag"	22,876	792 sq mi (2,051 km^{2})	State map highlighting Bandera County
Bastrop County	021	Bastrop	April 30, 1834	One of the original 23 counties	Baron Felipe Enrique Neri de Bastrop, the Dutch settler who provided essential help to Stephen F. Austin in obtaining his original land grants	118,908	888 sq mi (2,300 km^{2})	State map highlighting Bastrop County
Baylor County	023	Seymour	February 1, 1858	Fannin County	Henry Weidner Baylor, a surgeon in the Texas Rangers during the Mexican–American War	3,472	871 sq mi (2,256 km^{2})	State map highlighting Baylor County
Bee County	025	Beeville	December 8, 1857	San Patricio County, Goliad County, Refugio County, Live Oak County, and Karnes County	Barnard Elliott Bee, Sr. (1787–1853), a secretary of state of the Republic of Texas	32,515	880 sq mi (2,279 km^{2})	State map highlighting Bee County
Bell County	027	Belton	January 22, 1850	Milam County	Peter Hansborough Bell, the third governor of Texas (1849–1853)	402,248	1,059 sq mi (2,743 km^{2})	State map highlighting Bell County
Bexar County	029	San Antonio	December 19, 1836	One of the original 23 counties	San Antonio de Béxar, the major presidio in Mexican Texas, named in turn for the San Antonio River and the Spanish viceroy's family, who were Dukes of Béjar in Spain	2,160,088	1,247 sq mi (3,230 km^{2})	State map highlighting Bexar County
Blanco County	031	Johnson City	February 12, 1858	Burnet County, Comal County, Gillespie County and Hays County	The Blanco River. (Blanco is Spanish for "white")	13,581	711 sq mi (1,841 km^{2})	State map highlighting Blanco County
Borden County	033	Gail	November 19, 1876	Bexar County	Gail Borden, Jr. (1801–1874), businessman, publisher, surveyor, and inventor of condensed milk	567	899 sq mi (2,328 km^{2})	State map highlighting Borden County
Bosque County	035	Meridian	February 4, 1854	McLennan County	The Bosque River. (Bosque is Spanish for "wooded")	18,918	989 sq mi (2,561 km^{2})	State map highlighting Bosque County
Bowie County	037	New Boston	December 17, 1840	Red River County	James Bowie (1796–1836), the legendary knife fighter who died at the Battle of the Alamo	92,696	888 sq mi (2,300 km^{2})	State map highlighting Bowie County
Brazoria County	039	Angleton	May 1, 1832	One of the original 23 counties	Brazoria, Texas, an early port on the Brazos River	419,080	1,387 sq mi (3,592 km^{2})	State map highlighting Brazoria County
Brazos County	041	Bryan	January 30, 1841	Washington County. Named Navasota County until 1842	The Brazos River (from Spanish Los Brazos de Dios, the arms of God)	249,088	586 sq mi (1,518 km^{2})	State map highlighting Brazos County
Brewster County	043	Alpine	February 2, 1887	Presidio County	Henry Percy Brewster (1816–1884), a secretary of war for the Republic of Texas and soldier in the Civil War	9,458	6,193 sq mi (16,040 km^{2})	State map highlighting Brewster County
Briscoe County	045	Silverton	November 19, 1876	Bexar County	Andrew Briscoe (1810–1849), a signatory of the Texan Declaration of Independence and soldier during the Texan Revolution	1,474	900 sq mi (2,331 km^{2})	State map highlighting Briscoe County
Brooks County	047	Falfurrias	March 11, 1911	Starr County	James Abijah Brooks, a Texas Ranger and state legislator	6,579	943 sq mi (2,442 km^{2})	State map highlighting Brooks County
Brown County	049	Brownwood	August 27, 1856	Comanche County and Travis County	Henry Stevenson Brown, a commander at the Battle of Velasco	38,711	944 sq mi (2,445 km^{2})	State map highlighting Brown County
Burleson County	051	Caldwell	March 24, 1846	Milam County	Edward Burleson (1798–1851), a general of the Texas Revolution and Vice President of the Republic of Texas	20,549	666 sq mi (1,725 km^{2})	State map highlighting Burleson County
Burnet County	053	Burnet	February 5, 1852	Bell County, Travis County and Williamson County	David Gouverneur Burnet, the first president of the Republic of Texas (1836)	57,015	995 sq mi (2,577 km^{2})	State map highlighting Burnet County
Caldwell County	055	Lockhart	March 6, 1848	Bastrop County and Gonzales County	Matthew Caldwell, a signer of the Texas Declaration of Independence and soldier during the Texas Revolution	55,150	546 sq mi (1,414 km^{2})	State map highlighting Caldwell County
Calhoun County	057	Port Lavaca	April 4, 1846	Jackson County, Matagorda County and Victoria County	John C. Calhoun, the seventh vice president of the United States (1825–1832)	19,599	512 sq mi (1,326 km^{2})	State map highlighting Calhoun County
Callahan County	059	Baird	February 1, 1858	Bexar County, Bosque County, and Travis County	James Hughes Callahan, a soldier during the Texas Revolution	14,491	899 sq mi (2,328 km^{2})	State map highlighting Callahan County
Cameron County	061	Brownsville	February 12, 1848	Nueces County and lands ceded by Mexico	Ewen Cameron, a soldier during the Texas Revolution killed during the Black Bean Episode	433,946	906 sq mi (2,347 km^{2})	State map highlighting Cameron County
Camp County	063	Pittsburg	April 6, 1874	Upshur County	John Lafayette Camp (1828–1891), a Texas state senator	13,380	198 sq mi (513 km^{2})	State map highlighting Camp County
Carson County	065	Panhandle	November 19, 1876	Bexar County	Samuel Price Carson, the first secretary of state of the Republic of Texas (1836–1838)	5,805	923 sq mi (2,391 km^{2})	State map highlighting Carson County
Cass County	067	Linden	April 25, 1846	Bowie County Named Davis County from 1861 to 1871	Lewis Cass (1782–1866), a senator from Michigan, who had favored the annexation of Texas to the United States. Named Davis County 1861-1871	28,651	938 sq mi (2,429 km^{2})	State map highlighting Cass County
Castro County	069	Dimmitt	November 19, 1876	Bexar County	Henri Castro (1786–1865), a French consul general for the Republic of Texas and founder of a colony in Texas	7,295	898 sq mi (2,326 km^{2})	State map highlighting Castro County
Chambers County	071	Anahuac	February 12, 1858	Jefferson County and Liberty County	Thomas Jefferson Chambers, lawyer and surveyor who helped to resolve land disputes for Americans in Mexican Texas	57,594	599 sq mi (1,551 km^{2})	State map highlighting Chambers County
Cherokee County	073	Rusk	April 11, 1846	Nacogdoches County	The Cherokee Native American tribe	53,337	1,052 sq mi (2,725 km^{2})	State map highlighting Cherokee County
Childress County	075	Childress	November 19, 1876	Bexar County	George Campbell Childress (1804–1841), one of the authors of the Texas Declaration of Independence	6,643	710 sq mi (1,839 km^{2})	State map highlighting Childress County
Clay County	077	Henrietta	December 14, 1857	Cooke County	Henry Clay, U.S. Senator from Kentucky and ninth secretary of state of the United States (1825–1829)	10,764	1,098 sq mi (2,844 km^{2})	State map highlighting Clay County
Cochran County	079	Morton	November 19, 1876	Bexar County	Robert E. Cochran (1810–1836), a defender of the Alamo	2,546	775 sq mi (2,007 km^{2})	State map highlighting Cochran County
Coke County	081	Robert Lee	March 13, 1889	Tom Green County	Richard Coke, the 15th governor of Texas (1874–1876)	3,412	899 sq mi (2,328 km^{2})	State map highlighting Coke County
Coleman County	083	Coleman	February 1, 1858	Brown County and Travis County	Robert M. Coleman, a signer of the Texas Declaration of Independence and soldier at the Battle of San Jacinto	7,915	1,273 sq mi (3,297 km^{2})	State map highlighting Coleman County
Collin County	085	McKinney	April 3, 1846	Fannin County	Collin McKinney (1766–1861), an author of the Texas Declaration of Independence and the oldest person to sign it	1,297,179	848 sq mi (2,196 km^{2})	State map highlighting Collin County
Collingsworth County	087	Wellington	November 19, 1876	Bexar County	James Collinsworth, a signer of the Texas Declaration of Independence and first chief justice of the Republic of Texas. (spelling differs due to an error in the bill creating the county)	2,487	919 sq mi (2,380 km^{2})	State map highlighting Collingsworth County
Colorado County	089	Columbus	January 16, 1836	One of the original 23 counties	The Colorado River of Texas (Colorado is Spanish for "colored")	21,439	963 sq mi (2,494 km^{2})	State map highlighting Colorado County
Comal County	091	New Braunfels	March 24, 1846	Bexar County	The Comal River. (Comal is Spanish for "basin")	209,166	562 sq mi (1,456 km^{2})	State map highlighting Comal County
Comanche County	093	Comanche	January 25, 1856	Bosque County and Coryell County	The Comanche Native American tribe	14,432	938 sq mi (2,429 km^{2})	State map highlighting Comanche County
Concho County	095	Paint Rock	February 1, 1858	Bexar County	The Concho River. (Concho is Spanish for "shell")	3,607	992 sq mi (2,569 km^{2})	State map highlighting Concho County
Cooke County	097	Gainesville	March 20, 1848	Fannin County	William Gordon Cooke, a soldier during the Texas Revolution	44,461	874 sq mi (2,264 km^{2})	State map highlighting Cooke County
Coryell County	099	Gatesville	February 4, 1854	Bell County	James Coryell, a frontiersman and Texas Ranger who was killed by Native Americans	85,592	1,052 sq mi (2,725 km^{2})	State map highlighting Coryell County
Cottle County	101	Paducah	November 19, 1876	Fannin County	George Washington Cottle, who died defending the Alamo	1,224	901 sq mi (2,334 km^{2})	State map highlighting Cottle County
Crane County	103	Crane	February 26, 1887	Tom Green County	William Carey Crane, a president of Baylor University	4,554	786 sq mi (2,036 km^{2})	State map highlighting Crane County
Crockett County	105	Ozona	January 22, 1875	Bexar County	David Crockett (1786–1836), the legendary frontiersman who died at the Battle of the Alamo	2,769	2,808 sq mi (7,273 km^{2})	State map highlighting Crockett County
Crosby County	107	Crosbyton	November 19, 1876	Bexar County	Stephen Crosby, a Texas Land Commissioner	4,852	900 sq mi (2,331 km^{2})	State map highlighting Crosby County
Culberson County	109	Van Horn	March 10, 1911	El Paso County	David Browning Culberson, a lawyer, U.S. Congressman, and soldier in the Civil War	2,267	3,813 sq mi (9,876 km^{2})	State map highlighting Culberson County
Dallam County	111	Dalhart	November 19, 1876	Bexar County	James Wilmer Dallam, a lawyer and newspaper publisher who had a close association with the Supreme Court of Texas	7,508	1,505 sq mi (3,898 km^{2})	State map highlighting Dallam County
Dallas County	113	Dallas	March 30, 1846	Nacogdoches County and Robertson County	George Mifflin Dallas, the eleventh vice president of the United States (1845–1849) (Disputed)	2,661,397	880 sq mi (2,279 km^{2})	State map highlighting Dallas County
Dawson County	115	Lamesa	November 19, 1876	Bexar County	Nicholas Mosby Dawson, a soldier of the Texan Revolution and victim of the Dawson Massacre	11,776	902 sq mi (2,336 km^{2})	State map highlighting Dawson County
Deaf Smith County	117	Hereford	November 19, 1876	Bexar County	Erastus "Deaf" Smith (1787–1837), a scout during the Texan Revolution	18,626	1,497 sq mi (3,877 km^{2})	State map highlighting Deaf Smith County
Delta County	119	Cooper	July 29, 1870	Hopkins County and Lamar County	Its triangular shape, much like the Greek letter Delta	5,549	277 sq mi (717 km^{2})	State map highlighting Delta County
Denton County	121	Denton	April 11, 1846	Fannin County	John Bunyan Denton (1806–1841), a preacher, lawyer, and soldier killed during a raid on a Native American camp	1,069,346	888 sq mi (2,300 km^{2})	State map highlighting Denton County
DeWitt County	123	Cuero	March 24, 1846	Goliad County, Gonzales County and Victoria County	Green DeWitt, an empresario who founded an early colony in Texas	20,309	909 sq mi (2,354 km^{2})	State map highlighting DeWitt County
Dickens County	125	Dickens	November 19, 1876	Bexar County	J.A. Dickens, who died at the Battle of the Alamo	1,692	904 sq mi (2,341 km^{2})	State map highlighting Dickens County
Dimmit County	127	Carrizo Springs	February 1, 1858	Bexar County, Maverick County, Uvalde County and Webb County	Philip Dimmitt, a major figure in the Texas Revolution	8,024	1,331 sq mi (3,447 km^{2})	State map highlighting Dimmit County
Donley County	129	Clarendon	November 19, 1876	Bexar County	Stockton P. Donley, a frontier lawyer and Texas Supreme Court justice	3,213	930 sq mi (2,409 km^{2})	State map highlighting Donley County
Duval County	131	San Diego	February 1, 1858	Live Oak County, Nueces County and Starr County	Burr Harrison DuVal (1809–1836), a soldier in the Texas Revolution who died in the Goliad Massacre	9,402	1,793 sq mi (4,644 km^{2})	State map highlighting Duval County
Eastland County	133	Eastland	February 1, 1858	Bosque County, Coryell County and Travis County	William Mosby Eastland, a soldier during the Texas Revolution	18,143	926 sq mi (2,398 km^{2})	State map highlighting Eastland County
Ector County	135	Odessa	February 26, 1887	Tom Green County	Matthew Ector (1822–1879), a Confederate general during the Civil War	173,801	901 sq mi (2,334 km^{2})	State map highlighting Ector County
Edwards County	137	Rocksprings	February 1, 1858	Bexar County	Haden Edwards (1771–1849), empresario and filibuster who led the Fredonian Rebellion	1,370	2,120 sq mi (5,491 km^{2})	State map highlighting Edwards County
Ellis County	139	Waxahachie	December 20, 1849	Navarro County	Richard Ellis (1781–1846), president of the convention that produced the Texas Declaration of Independence	240,867	940 sq mi (2,435 km^{2})	State map highlighting Ellis County
El Paso County	141	El Paso	January 3, 1850	Santa Fe County	Neighboring Ciudad Juárez, Mexico, formerly called El Paso del Norte as it served as the pass north from central Mexico to the settlements of New Mexico	877,858	1,013 sq mi (2,624 km^{2})	State map highlighting El Paso County
Erath County	143	Stephenville	January 25, 1856	Bosque County and Coryell County	George Bernard Erath, an early surveyor and a soldier at the Battle of San Jacinto	43,911	1,086 sq mi (2,813 km^{2})	State map highlighting Erath County
Falls County	145	Marlin	January 28, 1850	Limestone County and Milam County	The Falls on the Brazos	17,869	769 sq mi (1,992 km^{2})	State map highlighting Falls County
Fannin County	147	Bonham	December 14, 1837	Red River County	James Walker Fannin, Jr. (1805–1836), the commander of the Texans killed in the Goliad Massacre	39,265	892 sq mi (2,310 km^{2})	State map highlighting Fannin County
Fayette County	149	La Grange	December 14, 1837	Bastrop County	Gilbert du Motier, marquis de La Fayette (1757–1834), the French-born general and hero of the American Revolutionary War	25,459	950 sq mi (2,460 km^{2})	State map highlighting Fayette County
Fisher County	151	Roby	November 19, 1876	Bexar County	Samuel Rhoads Fisher (1794–1839), a signer of the Texas Declaration of Independence and secretary of the Navy under the Republic of Texas	3,692	901 sq mi (2,334 km^{2})	State map highlighting Fisher County
Floyd County	153	Floydada	November 19, 1876	Bexar County	Dolphin Ward Floyd, who died defending the Alamo	4,881	992 sq mi (2,569 km^{2})	State map highlighting Floyd County
Foard County	155	Crowell	March 3, 1891	Cottle County, Hardeman County, King County and Knox County	Robert Levi Foard, an attorney and Confederate major in the Civil War	1,044	707 sq mi (1,831 km^{2})	State map highlighting Foard County
Fort Bend County	157	Richmond	December 29, 1837	Austin County, Brazoria County and Harris County	A blockhouse positioned in a bend of the Brazos River	975,191	875 sq mi (2,266 km^{2})	State map highlighting Fort Bend County
Franklin County	159	Mount Vernon	March 13, 1875	Titus County	Benjamin Cromwell Franklin (1805–1873), a judge and Texas State Senator	10,994	286 sq mi (741 km^{2})	State map highlighting Franklin County
Freestone County	161	Fairfield	September 6, 1850	Limestone County	A type of peach grown in the area	20,811	885 sq mi (2,292 km^{2})	State map highlighting Freestone County
Frio County	163	Pearsall	February 1, 1858	Atascosa County, Bexar County and Uvalde County	The Frio River (Frío is Spanish for "cold")	18,823	1,133 sq mi (2,934 km^{2})	State map highlighting Frio County
Gaines County	165	Seminole	November 19, 1876	Bexar County	James Gaines, merchant and signer of the Texas Declaration of Independence	23,956	1,502 sq mi (3,890 km^{2})	State map highlighting Gaines County
Galveston County	167	Galveston	May 15, 1838	Brazoria County, Harris County and Liberty County	Its county seat, named after Bernardo de Gálvez, Spanish governor of the Louisiana Territory (1777–1785)	372,207	399 sq mi (1,033 km^{2})	State map highlighting Galveston County
Garza County	169	Post	November 19, 1876	Bexar County	José Antonio de la Garza, pioneering settler and first Mayor of San Antonio	4,510	896 sq mi (2,321 km^{2})	State map highlighting Garza County
Gillespie County	171	Fredericksburg	February 23, 1848	Bexar County and Travis County	Robert Addison Gillespie, a merchant, Mexican–American War soldier, and Texas Ranger	28,527	1,061 sq mi (2,748 km^{2})	State map highlighting Gillespie County
Glasscock County	173	Garden City	April 4, 1887	Tom Green County	George Washington Glasscock (1810–1868), an early Texian settler, businessman, soldier, and state representative	1,128	901 sq mi (2,334 km^{2})	State map highlighting Glasscock County
Goliad County	175	Goliad	August 31, 1820	One of the original 23 counties	Its county seat, named in turn as an anagram of Miguel Hidalgo, the inspirational figure behind the Mexican War of Independence	7,208	854 sq mi (2,212 km^{2})	State map highlighting Goliad County
Gonzales County	177	Gonzales	November 30, 1832	One of the original 23 counties	Its county seat, named in turn for Coahuila y Tejas governor Rafael Gonzales	20,159	1,068 sq mi (2,766 km^{2})	State map highlighting Gonzales County
Gray County	179	Pampa	November 19, 1876	Bexar County	Peter W. Gray (1819–1874), a lawyer, state senator, and soldier in the Civil War	20,919	928 sq mi (2,404 km^{2})	State map highlighting Gray County
Grayson County	181	Sherman	March 17, 1846	Fannin County	Peter Wagener Grayson, an attorney general of the Republic of Texas	153,613	934 sq mi (2,419 km^{2})	State map highlighting Grayson County
Gregg County	183	Longview	May 7, 1873	Upshur County	John Gregg (1828–1864), a Confederate general during the Civil War	126,095	274 sq mi (710 km^{2})	State map highlighting Gregg County
Grimes County	185	Anderson	April 6, 1846	Montgomery County	Jesse Grimes (1788–1866), a signer of the Texas Declaration of Independence and early settler of the future county	34,252	794 sq mi (2,056 km^{2})	State map highlighting Grimes County
Guadalupe County	187	Seguin	March 30, 1846	Bexar County and Gonzales County	The Guadalupe River, named in turn for the Mexican spiritual icon Our Lady of Guadalupe	201,111	711 sq mi (1,841 km^{2})	State map highlighting Guadalupe County
Hale County	189	Plainview	November 19, 1876	Bexar County	John C. Hale, a lieutenant killed in action at the Battle of San Jacinto	31,819	1,005 sq mi (2,603 km^{2})	State map highlighting Hale County
Hall County	191	Memphis	November 19, 1876	Bexar County	Warren DeWitt Clinton Hall, a secretary of war for the Republic of Texas (1836)	2,737	903 sq mi (2,339 km^{2})	State map highlighting Hall County
Hamilton County	193	Hamilton	January 22, 1858	Bosque County, Comanche County and Lampasas County	James Hamilton Jr., governor of South Carolina (1830–1832) who gave financial aid to the Republic of Texas	8,680	836 sq mi (2,165 km^{2})	State map highlighting Hamilton County
Hansford County	195	Spearman	November 19, 1876	Bexar County	John M. Hansford, a Texas state representative and judge	4,944	920 sq mi (2,383 km^{2})	State map highlighting Hansford County
Hardeman County	197	Quanah	February 1, 1858	Fannin County	Bailey Hardeman, the first secretary of the treasury for the Republic of Texas, and his brother Thomas Jones Hardeman, state representative and judge	3,292	695 sq mi (1,800 km^{2})	State map highlighting Hardeman County
Hardin County	199	Kountze	January 22, 1858	Jefferson County and Liberty County	The Hardin family, earliest settlers of Liberty County	58,723	894 sq mi (2,315 km^{2})	State map highlighting Hardin County
Harris County	201	Houston	January 1, 1836	One of the original 23 counties Named Harrisburg County until 1839	John Richardson Harris, early settler and founder of Harrisburg, Texas, which eventually became known as Houston	5,045,026	1,729 sq mi (4,478 km^{2})	State map highlighting Harris County
Harrison County	203	Marshall	January 25, 1839	Shelby County	Jonas Harrison, a lawyer and soldier in the Texas Revolution	71,956	899 sq mi (2,328 km^{2})	State map highlighting Harrison County
Hartley County	205	Channing	November 19, 1876	Bexar County	Oliver C. and Rufus K. Hartley, brothers and original reporters for the Texas Supreme Court	4,904	1,462 sq mi (3,787 km^{2})	State map highlighting Hartley County
Haskell County	207	Haskell	February 1, 1858	Fannin County and Milam County	Charles Ready Haskell, Texas revolutionary soldier killed in the Goliad Massacre	5,499	903 sq mi (2,339 km^{2})	State map highlighting Haskell County
Hays County	209	San Marcos	March 1, 1848	Travis County	John Coffee Hays (1817–1883), a leading Texas Ranger and Mexican–American War officer	304,390	678 sq mi (1,756 km^{2})	State map highlighting Hays County
Hemphill County	211	Canadian	November 19, 1876	Bexar County	John Hemphill (1803–1862), U.S. Senator and Chief Justice of the Texas Supreme Court	3,083	910 sq mi (2,357 km^{2})	State map highlighting Hemphill County
Henderson County	213	Athens	April 27, 1846	Houston County and Nacogdoches County	James Pinckney Henderson, the first governor of Texas (1846–1847)	88,595	874 sq mi (2,264 km^{2})	State map highlighting Henderson County
Hidalgo County	215	Edinburg	January 24, 1852	Cameron County	Miguel Hidalgo y Costilla (1753–1811), the priest who raised the call for Mexico's independence from Spain	921,549	1,569 sq mi (4,064 km^{2})	State map highlighting Hidalgo County
Hill County	217	Hillsboro	February 7, 1853	Navarro County	George Washington Hill, a secretary of war and secretary of the navy under the Republic of Texas	39,503	962 sq mi (2,492 km^{2})	State map highlighting Hill County
Hockley County	219	Levelland	November 19, 1876	Bexar County	George Washington Hockley (1802–1854), Chief of Staff of the Texas Army during the Texas Revolution and secretary of war of the Republic of Texas	21,600	908 sq mi (2,352 km^{2})	State map highlighting Hockley County
Hood County	221	Granbury	November 2, 1866	Johnson County	John Bell Hood (1831–1879), a Confederate lieutenant general and the commander of Hood's Texas Brigade	70,501	422 sq mi (1,093 km^{2})	State map highlighting Hood County
Hopkins County	223	Sulphur Springs	March 25, 1846	Lamar County and Nacogdoches County	David Hopkins, an early settler in the future county	39,063	785 sq mi (2,033 km^{2})	State map highlighting Hopkins County
Houston County	225	Crockett	June 12, 1837	Nacogdoches County	Sam Houston (1793–1863), general of the Texan Revolution, commander at the Battle of San Jacinto and later president of the Republic of Texas, U.S. Senator and governor of the state of Texas	22,316	1,231 sq mi (3,188 km^{2})	State map highlighting Houston County
Howard County	227	Big Spring	November 19, 1876	Bexar County	Volney Eskine Howard, U.S. Representative from Texas (1849–1853)	30,504	903 sq mi (2,339 km^{2})	State map highlighting Howard County
Hudspeth County	229	Sierra Blanca	June 19, 1917	El Paso County	Claude Benton Hudspeth, a U.S. Congressman (1919–1931), rancher, and newspaper publisher	3,433	4,571 sq mi (11,839 km^{2})	State map highlighting Hudspeth County
Hunt County	231	Greenville	April 11, 1846	Fannin County and Nacogdoches County	Memucan Hunt, Jr. (1807–1856), a secretary of the navy under the Republic of Texas	123,336	841 sq mi (2,178 km^{2})	State map highlighting Hunt County
Hutchinson County	233	Stinnett	November 19, 1876	Bexar County	Andrew Hutchinson, an early settler and attorney	19,633	887 sq mi (2,297 km^{2})	State map highlighting Hutchinson County
Irion County	235	Mertzon	March 7, 1889	Tom Green County	Robert Anderson Irion (1804–1861), a secretary of state in the Republic of Texas	1,463	1,052 sq mi (2,725 km^{2})	State map highlighting Irion County
Jack County	237	Jacksboro	August 27, 1856	Cooke County	Patrick and William Jack, brothers, participants in the Anahuac Disturbance, and veterans of the Texas Revolution	9,563	917 sq mi (2,375 km^{2})	State map highlighting Jack County
Jackson County	239	Edna	December 5, 1835	One of the original 23 counties	Andrew Jackson, hero of the Battle of New Orleans and the seventh president of the United States (1829–1837)	15,393	830 sq mi (2,150 km^{2})	State map highlighting Jackson County
Jasper County	241	Jasper	January 1, 1834	One of the original 23 counties	William Jasper (1750–1779), an American Revolutionary War hero	33,075	938 sq mi (2,429 km^{2})	State map highlighting Jasper County
Jeff Davis County	243	Fort Davis	March 15, 1887	Presidio County	Jefferson Davis, president of the Confederate States of America (1861–1865)	1,711	2,265 sq mi (5,866 km^{2})	State map highlighting Jeff Davis County
Jefferson County	245	Beaumont	December 9, 1835	One of the original 23 counties	Thomas Jefferson, the third president of the United States and the principal author of the Declaration of Independence (1801–1809)	254,321	904 sq mi (2,341 km^{2})	State map highlighting Jefferson County
Jim Hogg County	247	Hebbronville	June 30, 1913	Brooks County and Duval County	James Stephen Hogg, the twentieth (and first native-born) governor of Texas (1891–1895)	4,555	1,136 sq mi (2,942 km^{2})	State map highlighting Jim Hogg County
Jim Wells County	249	Alice	March 11, 1911	Nueces County	James Babbage Wells Jr., judge and Democratic party boss in southern Texas	38,804	865 sq mi (2,240 km^{2})	State map highlighting Jim Wells County
Johnson County	251	Cleburne	February 13, 1854	Ellis County, Hill County and Navarro County	Middleton Tate Johnson, a Texas Ranger, soldier in the Mexican–American War, and senator for the Republic of Texas	218,048	729 sq mi (1,888 km^{2})	State map highlighting Johnson County
Jones County	253	Anson	February 1, 1858	Bexar County and Bosque County	Anson Jones, the fifth president of the Republic of Texas (1844–1846)	20,861	931 sq mi (2,411 km^{2})	State map highlighting Jones County
Karnes County	255	Karnes City	February 4, 1854	Bexar County, DeWitt County, Goliad County, Gonzales County and San Patricio County	Henry Karnes (1812–1840), a soldier in the Texas Revolution	15,018	750 sq mi (1,942 km^{2})	State map highlighting Karnes County
Kaufman County	257	Kaufman	February 26, 1848	Henderson County	David Spangler Kaufman, a Jewish Texas state senator and the second Jewish member of the United States House of Representatives	209,235	786 sq mi (2,036 km^{2})	State map highlighting Kaufman County
Kendall County	259	Boerne	January 10, 1862	Blanco County and Kerr County	George Wilkins Kendall, an early journalist and sheep rancher who gained national fame as a war correspondent during the Mexican–American War	53,289	662 sq mi (1,715 km^{2})	State map highlighting Kendall County
Kenedy County	261	Sarita	April 2, 1921	Hidalgo County and Willacy County (Due to a reorganization of Willacy County)	Mifflin Kenedy, an early rancher and land speculator	319	1,457 sq mi (3,774 km^{2})	State map highlighting Kenedy County
Kent County	263	Jayton	November 19, 1876	Bexar County	Andrew Kent, who died at the Battle of the Alamo	674	902 sq mi (2,336 km^{2})	State map highlighting Kent County
Kerr County	265	Kerrville	January 26, 1856	Bexar County	James Kerr (1790–1850), an early colonist in Texas and soldier in the Texas Revolution	54,037	1,106 sq mi (2,865 km^{2})	State map highlighting Kerr County
Kimble County	267	Junction	January 22, 1858	Bexar County	George C. Kimbell, who died at the Battle of the Alamo (spelling differs due to an error in the bill creating the county)	4,438	1,251 sq mi (3,240 km^{2})	State map highlighting Kimble County
King County	269	Guthrie	November 19, 1876	Bexar County	William Phillip King, who died at the Battle of the Alamo	192	912 sq mi (2,362 km^{2})	State map highlighting King County
Kinney County	271	Brackettville	January 28, 1850	Bexar County	Henry Lawrence Kinney, a Texas state senator and unsuccessful land speculator	3,128	1,364 sq mi (3,533 km^{2})	State map highlighting Kinney County
Kleberg County	273	Kingsville	February 27, 1913	Nueces County	Robert Justus Kleberg (1803–1888), an early German settler and soldier at the Battle of San Jacinto	30,315	871 sq mi (2,256 km^{2})	State map highlighting Kleberg County
Knox County	275	Benjamin	February 1, 1858	Bexar County	Henry Knox, the first secretary of war of the United States (1785–1794)	3,192	854 sq mi (2,212 km^{2})	State map highlighting Knox County
Lamar County	277	Paris	December 17, 1840	Red River County	Mirabeau Buonaparte Lamar, the second president of the Republic of Texas (1838–1842)	51,503	917 sq mi (2,375 km^{2})	State map highlighting Lamar County
Lamb County	279	Littlefield	November 19, 1876	Bexar County	George A. Lamb, who died at the Battle of San Jacinto	12,579	1,016 sq mi (2,631 km^{2})	State map highlighting Lamb County
Lampasas County	281	Lampasas	February 1, 1856	Bell County, Coryell County and Travis County	The Lampasas River (Lampasas is Spanish for "lilies")	23,657	712 sq mi (1,844 km^{2})	State map highlighting Lampasas County
La Salle County	283	Cotulla	February 1, 1858	Bexar County	René Robert Cavelier, Sieur de La Salle (1643–1687), the French explorer who traveled through Texas	6,517	1,489 sq mi (3,856 km^{2})	State map highlighting La Salle County
Lavaca County	285	Hallettsville	April 6, 1846	Colorado County, Fayette County, Gonzales County, Jackson County and Victoria County; Named La Baca County until 1846	The Lavaca River (La vaca is Spanish for "the cow")	20,651	970 sq mi (2,512 km^{2})	State map highlighting Lavaca County
Lee County	287	Giddings	April 14, 1874	Bastrop County, Burleson County, Fayette County and Washington County	Robert Edward Lee (1807–1870), the commanding general of the Confederate forces during the Civil War	18,729	629 sq mi (1,629 km^{2})	State map highlighting Lee County
Leon County	289	Centerville	March 17, 1846	Robertson County	Disputed: Either Mexican empresario Martín De León, who founded Victoria, Texas; or the león, a local variety of yellow wolf	16,894	1,072 sq mi (2,776 km^{2})	State map highlighting Leon County
Liberty County	291	Liberty	May 5, 1831	One of the original 23 counties	Its county seat, which was named either for the recent success of the Mexican War of Independence or for Liberty, Mississippi	121,364	1,160 sq mi (3,004 km^{2})	State map highlighting Liberty County
Limestone County	293	Groesbeck	April 11, 1846	Robertson County	The limestone deposits in the region	22,849	909 sq mi (2,354 km^{2})	State map highlighting Limestone County
Lipscomb County	295	Lipscomb	November 19, 1876	Bexar County	Abner Smith Lipscomb, justice of the Texas Supreme Court (1846–1856) and secretary of state of the Republic of Texas (1840)	2,955	932 sq mi (2,414 km^{2})	State map highlighting Lipscomb County
Live Oak County	297	George West	February 2, 1856	Nueces County and San Patricio County	The Texas live oak tree under which the petition for a new county was signed	11,929	1,036 sq mi (2,683 km^{2})	State map highlighting Live Oak County
Llano County	299	Llano	February 1, 1856	Bexar County, Gillespie County	The Llano River (Llano is Spanish for "plains")	23,353	935 sq mi (2,422 km^{2})	State map highlighting Llano County
Loving County	301	Mentone	February 26, 1887	Tom Green County (1891); Reeves County (1931)	Oliver Loving (1812–1867), a cattle rancher and pioneer of the cattle drive who, with Charles Goodnight, developed the Goodnight–Loving Trail	52	673 sq mi (1,743 km^{2})	State map highlighting Loving County
Lubbock County	303	Lubbock	November 19, 1876	Bexar County	Thomas Saltus Lubbock (1817–1862), a Texas Ranger and Confederate colonel during the Civil War	328,906	900 sq mi (2,331 km^{2})	State map highlighting Lubbock County
Lynn County	305	Tahoka	November 19, 1876	Bexar County	William Lynn, a soldier in the Texas Revolution from Massachusetts who is believed to have died defending the Alamo	6,017	892 sq mi (2,310 km^{2})	State map highlighting Lynn County
McCulloch County	307	Brady	August 27, 1856	Bexar County	Benjamin McCulloch (1811–1862), veteran of San Jacinto, Texas Ranger, and Confederate general	7,472	1,069 sq mi (2,769 km^{2})	State map highlighting McCulloch County
McLennan County	309	Waco	January 22, 1850	Limestone County and Milam County	Neil McLennan, an early settler in the future county	272,020	1,042 sq mi (2,699 km^{2})	State map highlighting McLennan County
McMullen County	311	Tilden	February 1, 1858	Atascosa County, Bexar County and Live Oak County	John McMullen (1832–1883), an Irish-born empresario in Texas	544	1,113 sq mi (2,883 km^{2})	State map highlighting McMullen County
Madison County	313	Madisonville	January 27, 1853	Grimes County, Leon County and Walker County	James Madison, the fourth president of the United States (1809–1817)	14,226	470 sq mi (1,217 km^{2})	State map highlighting Madison County
Marion County	315	Jefferson	February 8, 1860	Cass County	Francis Marion (1732–1795), American Revolutionary War general	9,896	381 sq mi (987 km^{2})	State map highlighting Marion County
Martin County	317	Stanton	November 19, 1876	Bexar County	Wylie Martin, a Texas Revolutionary soldier and legislative representative for the Republic of Texas	5,284	915 sq mi (2,370 km^{2})	State map highlighting Martin County
Mason County	319	Mason	January 22, 1858	Gillespie County	Fort Mason, which was named for either Lt. George T. Mason, killed during the Mexican–American War in fighting near Brownsville, or for Gen. Richard Barnes Mason, military governor of California	3,990	932 sq mi (2,414 km^{2})	State map highlighting Mason County
Matagorda County	321	Bay City	March 6, 1834	One of the original 23 counties	The canebrakes which once grew along the coast (Mata gorda is Spanish for "fat bush")	36,463	1,114 sq mi (2,885 km^{2})	State map highlighting Matagorda County
Maverick County	323	Eagle Pass	February 2, 1856	Kinney County	Samuel Augustus Maverick (1803–1870), a rancher, signer of the Texas Declaration of Independence, and representative in the Republic of Texas legislature	58,823	1,280 sq mi (3,315 km^{2})	State map highlighting Maverick County
Medina County	325	Hondo	February 12, 1848	Bexar County	The Medina River, named for Spanish engineer Pedro de Medina	56,881	1,328 sq mi (3,440 km^{2})	State map highlighting Medina County
Menard County	327	Menard	January 22, 1858	Bexar County	Michel Branamour Menard, the founder of Galveston, Texas	1,956	902 sq mi (2,336 km^{2})	State map highlighting Menard County
Midland County	329	Midland	March 4, 1885	Tom Green County	Its county seat, which was named for its location halfway between Fort Worth and El Paso on the Texas and Pacific Railway (and "Midway, Texas", being already in use)	187,855	900 sq mi (2,331 km^{2})	State map highlighting Midland County
Milam County	331	Cameron	October 31, 1834	One of the original 23 counties	Benjamin Rush Milam (1788–1835), an early Texas colonizer and soldier in the Texas Revolution	26,258	1,017 sq mi (2,634 km^{2})	State map highlighting Milam County
Mills County	333	Goldthwaite	March 15, 1887	Brown County, Comanche County, Hamilton County and Lampasas County	John T. Mills (1817–1871), a Texas Supreme Court judge	4,580	748 sq mi (1,937 km^{2})	State map highlighting Mills County
Mitchell County	335	Colorado City	November 19, 1876	Bexar County	Asa and Eli Mitchell, two early settlers and soldiers in the Texas Revolution	8,947	910 sq mi (2,357 km^{2})	State map highlighting Mitchell County
Montague County	337	Montague	December 24, 1857	Cooke County	Daniel Montague, a state senator and early surveyor in the future county	21,966	931 sq mi (2,411 km^{2})	State map highlighting Montague County
Montgomery County	339	Conroe	December 14, 1837	Washington County	Montgomery, Texas, which was named for Andrew J. Montgomery, veteran in San Jacinto Battle in 1836.	781,194	1,044 sq mi (2,704 km^{2})	State map highlighting Montgomery County
Moore County	341	Dumas	November 19, 1876	Bexar County	Edwin Ward Moore (1810–1865), commodore of the Texan Navy	21,891	900 sq mi (2,331 km^{2})	State map highlighting Moore County
Morris County	343	Daingerfield	March 13, 1875	Titus County	William Wright Morris, a planter and state legislator	12,133	254 sq mi (658 km^{2})	State map highlighting Morris County
Motley County	345	Matador	November 19, 1876	Bexar County	Junius William Mottley, a signer of the Texas Declaration of Independence	1,043	989 sq mi (2,561 km^{2})	State map highlighting Motley County
Nacogdoches County	347	Nacogdoches	March 19, 1826	One of the original 23 counties	Its county seat, which was named for the Nacogdoche Native American tribe	66,035	947 sq mi (2,453 km^{2})	State map highlighting Nacogdoches County
Navarro County	349	Corsicana	April 15, 1846	Robertson County	José Antonio Navarro (1795–1871), a leading Tejano participant in the Texan Revolution and signer of the Texan Declaration of Independence	57,181	1,071 sq mi (2,774 km^{2})	State map highlighting Navarro County
Newton County	351	Newton	April 22, 1846	Jasper County	John Newton (1755–1780), a veteran of the Revolutionary War	11,954	933 sq mi (2,416 km^{2})	State map highlighting Newton County
Nolan County	353	Sweetwater	November 19, 1876	Bexar County	Philip Nolan (1771–1801), a mustanger who was killed by Spanish troops while on a mission into Texas	14,117	912 sq mi (2,362 km^{2})	State map highlighting Nolan County
Nueces County	355	Corpus Christi	April 18, 1846	San Patricio County	The Nueces River (Nueces is Spanish for "nuts")	352,992	836 sq mi (2,165 km^{2})	State map highlighting Nueces County
Ochiltree County	357	Perryton	November 19, 1876	Bexar County	William Beck Ochiltree (1811–1867), secretary of the treasury for the Republic of Texas and legislator for the state of Texas	9,284	918 sq mi (2,378 km^{2})	State map highlighting Ochiltree County
Oldham County	359	Vega	November 19, 1876	Bexar County	Williamson Simpson Oldham, a Confederate Senator for Texas	1,783	1,501 sq mi (3,888 km^{2})	State map highlighting Oldham County
Orange County	361	Orange	February 5, 1852	Jefferson County	An orange grove planted by early settlers at the mouth of the Sabine River	86,266	356 sq mi (922 km^{2})	State map highlighting Orange County
Palo Pinto County	363	Palo Pinto	August 27, 1856	Bosque County and Navarro County	The Palo Pinto Creek (Palo Pinto is Spanish for "painted stick")	30,791	953 sq mi (2,468 km^{2})	State map highlighting Palo Pinto County
Panola County	365	Carthage	March 30, 1846	Harrison County and Shelby County	A Native American word for cotton.	23,018	801 sq mi (2,075 km^{2})	State map highlighting Panola County
Parker County	367	Weatherford	December 12, 1855	Bosque County and Navarro County	Isaac Parker, legislator for both the Republic of Texas and the state of Texas	184,767	904 sq mi (2,341 km^{2})	State map highlighting Parker County
Parmer County	369	Farwell	November 19, 1876	Bexar County	Martin Parmer (1778–1850), a Republic of Texas legislator, judge, and signer of the Texas Declaration of Independence	9,678	882 sq mi (2,284 km^{2})	State map highlighting Parmer County
Pecos County	371	Fort Stockton	May 8, 1871	Presidio County	The Pecos River, which was named for the Pecos Pueblo, which is of unknown etymology	14,560	4,764 sq mi (12,339 km^{2})	State map highlighting Pecos County
Polk County	373	Livingston	March 30, 1846	Liberty County	James Knox Polk, the eleventh president of the United States (1845–1849)	53,434	1,057 sq mi (2,738 km^{2})	State map highlighting Polk County
Potter County	375	Amarillo	November 19, 1876	Bexar County	Robert Potter (1800–1842), secretary of the navy for the Republic of Texas, and signer of the Texas Declaration of Independence	114,453	909 sq mi (2,354 km^{2})	State map highlighting Potter County
Presidio County	377	Marfa	January 3, 1850	Santa Fe County	Presidio del Norte, an eighteenth-century fort and settlement on the south side of the Rio Grande	5,433	3,856 sq mi (9,987 km^{2})	State map highlighting Presidio County
Rains County	379	Emory	June 9, 1870	Hopkins County, Hunt County and Wood County	Emory Rains (1800–1878), a state senator and surveyor of the future county	13,542	259 sq mi (671 km^{2})	State map highlighting Rains County
Randall County	381	Canyon	November 19, 1876	Bexar County	Horace Randal, a Confederate brigadier general in the Civil War	152,351	914 sq mi (2,367 km^{2})	State map highlighting Randall County
Reagan County	383	Big Lake	March 7, 1903	Tom Green County	John H. Reagan (1818–1905), Confederate postmaster general, U.S. Congressman, and Governor of Texas	3,166	1,175 sq mi (3,043 km^{2})	State map highlighting Reagan County
Real County	385	Leakey	April 3, 1913	Bandera County, Edwards County and Kerr County	Julius Real, a rancher and state senator	2,745	700 sq mi (1,813 km^{2})	State map highlighting Real County
Red River County	387	Clarksville	November 11, 1835	One of the original 23 counties	The Red River of Texas	11,816	1,050 sq mi (2,719 km^{2})	State map highlighting Red River County
Reeves County	389	Pecos	April 14, 1883	Pecos County	George Robertson Reeves, a Texas state representative and colonel in the Confederate army	12,138	2,636 sq mi (6,827 km^{2})	State map highlighting Reeves County
Refugio County	391	Refugio	July 1, 1834	One of the original 23 counties	Its county seat, which was named for the Spanish mission Nuestra Señora del Refugio, "Our Lady of Refuge"	6,657	770 sq mi (1,994 km^{2})	State map highlighting Refugio County
Roberts County	393	Miami	November 19, 1876	Bexar County	John S. Roberts, a signer of the Texan Declaration of Independence, and his brother Oran Milo Roberts, attorney general for the Republic of Texas and the seventeenth governor of Texas	867	924 sq mi (2,393 km^{2})	State map highlighting Roberts County
Robertson County	395	Franklin	December 14, 1837	Bexar County, Milam County and Nacogdoches County	Sterling Clack Robertson, an empresario in Mexican Texas	17,839	855 sq mi (2,214 km^{2})	State map highlighting Robertson County
Rockwall County	397	Rockwall	March 1, 1873	Kaufman County	Its county seat, which was named for a submerged stone wall found by its initial settlers	140,738	149 sq mi (386 km^{2})	State map highlighting Rockwall County
Runnels County	399	Ballinger	February 1, 1858	Bexar County and Travis County	Hiram Runnels, the ninth governor of Mississippi (1833–1835) and planter in Texas	9,693	1,054 sq mi (2,730 km^{2})	State map highlighting Runnels County
Rusk County	401	Henderson	January 16, 1843	Nacogdoches County	Thomas Jefferson Rusk (1803–1857), a general in the Texas Revolution	54,854	924 sq mi (2,393 km^{2})	State map highlighting Rusk County
Sabine County	403	Hemphill	December 15, 1835	One of the original 23 counties	The Sabine River, which forms its eastern border (Sabina is Spanish for "cypress")	10,012	490 sq mi (1,269 km^{2})	State map highlighting Sabine County
San Augustine County	405	San Augustine	March 6, 1834	One of the original 23 counties	Presumably Augustine of Hippo (354–430)	7,722	528 sq mi (1,368 km^{2})	State map highlighting San Augustine County
San Jacinto County	407	Coldspring	August 13, 1870	Liberty County, Montgomery County, Polk County and Walker County	The Battle of San Jacinto, which won Texas its independence from Mexico. San Jacinto is Spanish for Saint Hyacinth	29,488	571 sq mi (1,479 km^{2})	State map highlighting San Jacinto County
San Patricio County	409	Sinton	April 30, 1834	One of the original 23 counties	Its former county seat San Patricio de Hibernia, an Irish colony named for Saint Patrick	72,053	692 sq mi (1,792 km^{2})	State map highlighting San Patricio County
San Saba County	411	San Saba	February 1, 1856	Bexar County	The San Saba River, discovered on the Catholic feast of Saint Sabbas	5,787	1,134 sq mi (2,937 km^{2})	State map highlighting San Saba County
Schleicher County	413	Eldorado	April 1, 1887	Crockett County	Gustav Schleicher, engineer and U.S. Congressman from Texas	2,245	1,311 sq mi (3,395 km^{2})	State map highlighting Schleicher County
Scurry County	415	Snyder	November 19, 1876	Bexar County	William Read Scurry (1821–1864), a Texas state legislator and Confederate general	16,162	903 sq mi (2,339 km^{2})	State map highlighting Scurry County
Shackelford County	417	Albany	February 1, 1858	Bosque County	Jack Shackelford, a soldier of the Texas Revolution	3,197	914 sq mi (2,367 km^{2})	State map highlighting Shackelford County
Shelby County	419	Center	November 11, 1835	One of the original 23 counties	Isaac Shelby, a Revolutionary War soldier from Tennessee and governor of Kentucky (1792–1796) (1812–1816)	24,286	794 sq mi (2,056 km^{2})	State map highlighting Shelby County
Sherman County	421	Stratford	November 19, 1876	Bexar County	Sidney Sherman (1805–1873), a soldier in the Texas Revolution	2,781	923 sq mi (2,391 km^{2})	State map highlighting Sherman County
Smith County	423	Tyler	April 11, 1846	Nacogdoches County	James Smith, a general during the Texas Revolution	252,549	928 sq mi (2,404 km^{2})	State map highlighting Smith County
Somervell County	425	Glen Rose	March 13, 1875	Hood County	Alexander Somervell, a soldier in the Texas Revolution and leader of the Somervell Expedition	10,261	187 sq mi (484 km^{2})	State map highlighting Somervell County
Starr County	427	Rio Grande City	February 10, 1848	Nueces County	James Harper Starr (1809–1890), a treasurer for the Republic of Texas and Confederate official	66,319	1,223 sq mi (3,168 km^{2})	State map highlighting Starr County
Stephens County	429	Breckenridge	January 22, 1858	Bosque County; Named Buchanan County until 1861	Alexander Hamilton Stephens, the only vice-president of the Confederate States of America (1861–1865)	9,380	895 sq mi (2,318 km^{2})	State map highlighting Stephens County
Sterling County	431	Sterling City	March 4, 1891	Tom Green County	W. S. Sterling, an early rancher, buffalo hunter, and Native American fighter	1,349	923 sq mi (2,391 km^{2})	State map highlighting Sterling County
Stonewall County	433	Aspermont	November 19, 1876	Bexar County	Thomas Jonathan "Stonewall" Jackson (1824–1863), the famous Confederate General	1,186	919 sq mi (2,380 km^{2})	State map highlighting Stonewall County
Sutton County	435	Sonora	April 1, 1887	Crockett County	John Schuyler Sutton, a Texas Ranger and soldier in the Texas Revolution and Mexican–American War	3,203	1,454 sq mi (3,766 km^{2})	State map highlighting Sutton County
Swisher County	437	Tulia	November 19, 1876	Bexar County	James Gibson Swisher, a soldier of the Texas Revolution	6,703	900 sq mi (2,331 km^{2})	State map highlighting Swisher County
Tarrant County	439	Fort Worth	December 20, 1849	Navarro County	Edward H. Tarrant, a U.S. Army general who drove the Native Americans out of the future county	2,248,466	864 sq mi (2,238 km^{2})	State map highlighting Tarrant County
Taylor County	441	Abilene	February 1, 1858	Bexar County and Travis County	Edward Taylor (1812–1836), George Taylor (1816–1836), and James Taylor (1814–1836), three brothers who died at the Alamo	150,077	916 sq mi (2,372 km^{2})	State map highlighting Taylor County
Terrell County	443	Sanderson	July 14, 1905	Pecos County	Alexander Watkins Terrell, attorney, judge, state legislator, diplomat, and Confederate cavalry officer	702	2,358 sq mi (6,107 km^{2})	State map highlighting Terrell County
Terry County	445	Brownfield	November 19, 1876	Bexar County	Frank Terry, a Confederate colonel and commander of Terry's Texas Rangers	11,720	890 sq mi (2,305 km^{2})	State map highlighting Terry County
Throckmorton County	447	Throckmorton	January 13, 1858	Fannin County	William Edward Throckmorton, an early Collin County settler	1,554	912 sq mi (2,362 km^{2})	State map highlighting Throckmorton County
Titus County	449	Mount Pleasant	May 11, 1846	Bowie County	Andrew Jackson Titus, planter and Texas state representative	31,563	411 sq mi (1,064 km^{2})	State map highlighting Titus County
Tom Green County	451	San Angelo	March 13, 1874	Bexar County	Thomas Green (1814–1864), a Confederate brigadier general	120,602	1,522 sq mi (3,942 km^{2})	State map highlighting Tom Green County
Travis County	453	Austin	January 15, 1840	Bastrop County	William Barret Travis (1809–1836), the commander of the Texan forces at the Alamo	1,389,670	989 sq mi (2,561 km^{2})	State map highlighting Travis County
Trinity County	455	Groveton	February 11, 1850	Houston County	The Trinity River, named for the spiritual concept of the Trinity	14,384	693 sq mi (1,795 km^{2})	State map highlighting Trinity County
Tyler County	457	Woodville	April 3, 1846	Liberty County	John Tyler, the tenth president of the United States (1841–1845)	20,443	923 sq mi (2,391 km^{2})	State map highlighting Tyler County
Upshur County	459	Gilmer	April 27, 1846	Harrison County	Abel Parker Upshur, the fifteenth secretary of state of the United States (1843–1844)	44,410	588 sq mi (1,523 km^{2})	State map highlighting Upshur County
Upton County	461	Rankin	February 26, 1887	Tom Green County	John C. & William F. Upton, brothers and lieutenant colonels in the Confederate army during the Civil War	3,131	1,242 sq mi (3,217 km^{2})	State map highlighting Upton County
Uvalde County	463	Uvalde	February 8, 1850	Bexar County	The Cañón de Ugalde, a nearby battlefield where Spanish General Juan de Ugalde was victorious in a skirmish with over 300 Apaches	24,963	1,557 sq mi (4,033 km^{2})	State map highlighting Uvalde County
Val Verde County	465	Del Rio	March 24, 1885	Crockett County, Kinney County and Pecos County	Civil War Battle of Val Verde (Val Verde is Spanish for "green valley")	47,835	3,171 sq mi (8,213 km^{2})	State map highlighting Val Verde County
Van Zandt County	467	Canton	March 20, 1848	Henderson County	Isaac Van Zandt (1813–1847), attorney, Texas state representative, and diplomat	66,130	849 sq mi (2,199 km^{2})	State map highlighting Van Zandt County
Victoria County	469	Victoria	December 31, 1828	One of the original 23 counties	Its county seat, which was named for Guadalupe Victoria, Mexican revolutionary and its first president (1824–1829)	92,656	883 sq mi (2,287 km^{2})	State map highlighting Victoria County
Walker County	471	Huntsville	April 6, 1846	Montgomery County	Robert J. Walker (1801–1869); officially renamed after Samuel Hamilton Walker (no relation) (1815–1847), a Texas Ranger and soldier in the Mexican–American War	83,842	788 sq mi (2,041 km^{2})	State map highlighting Walker County
Waller County	473	Hempstead	May 7, 1873	Austin County and Grimes County	Edwin Waller (1800–1881), a signer of the Texas Declaration of Independence and the first mayor of Austin, Texas	69,858	514 sq mi (1,331 km^{2})	State map highlighting Waller County
Ward County	475	Monahans	March 26, 1887	Tom Green County	Thomas William Ward, a commissioner for the General Land Office of Texas and mayor of Austin, Texas	11,125	836 sq mi (2,165 km^{2})	State map highlighting Ward County
Washington County	477	Brenham	July 18, 1835	One of the original 23 counties	George Washington, the first president of the United States (1789–1797)	38,288	609 sq mi (1,577 km^{2})	State map highlighting Washington County
Webb County	479	Laredo	January 28, 1848	Nueces County	James Webb, who served as secretary of the Treasury, secretary of State, and Attorney General of the Republic of Texas	281,224	3,357 sq mi (8,695 km^{2})	State map highlighting Webb County
Wharton County	481	Wharton	April 3, 1846	Colorado County, Jackson County and Matagorda County	William Harris Wharton (1802–1839) and John Austin Wharton (1806–1838), brothers and officers in the Texas Revolution	42,060	1,090 sq mi (2,823 km^{2})	State map highlighting Wharton County
Wheeler County	483	Wheeler	November 19, 1876	Bexar County	Royal Tyler Wheeler, the second Chief Justice of the Texas Supreme Court	4,773	914 sq mi (2,367 km^{2})	State map highlighting Wheeler County
Wichita County	485	Wichita Falls	February 1, 1858	Cooke County	The Wichita Native American tribe	129,555	628 sq mi (1,627 km^{2})	State map highlighting Wichita County
Wilbarger County	487	Vernon	February 1, 1858	Bexar County	Josiah P. (1801–1845) and Mathias Wilbarger, brothers and early settlers; Josiah became a mythical figure for living 11 years after being scalped	12,481	971 sq mi (2,515 km^{2})	State map highlighting Wilbarger County
Willacy County	489	Raymondville	March 11, 1911	Cameron County and Hidalgo County	John G. Willacy, Texas state senator who was the author of the bill that established the county	19,971	597 sq mi (1,546 km^{2})	State map highlighting Willacy County
Williamson County	491	Georgetown	March 13, 1848	Milam County	Robert McAlpin Williamson, a leader and veteran of the Battle of San Jacinto	752,827	1,124 sq mi (2,911 km^{2})	State map highlighting Williamson County
Wilson County	493	Floresville	February 13, 1860	Bexar County, Guadalupe County and Karnes County Named Cibolo County for a brief period	James Charles Wilson, a Texas state senator (1851–1853)	56,139	807 sq mi (2,090 km^{2})	State map highlighting Wilson County
Winkler County	495	Kermit	February 26, 1887	Tom Green County	Clinton Winkler, an appeals court judge, Texas state representative, and Confederate colonel	7,540	841 sq mi (2,178 km^{2})	State map highlighting Winkler County
Wise County	497	Decatur	January 23, 1856	Cooke County	Henry Alexander Wise, the U.S. Congressman and future thirty-eighth governor of Virginia (1856–1860) who supported the annexation of Texas	83,778	905 sq mi (2,344 km^{2})	State map highlighting Wise County
Wood County	499	Quitman	February 5, 1850	Van Zandt County	George Tyler Wood, the second governor of Texas (1847–1849)	49,688	650 sq mi (1,683 km^{2})	State map highlighting Wood County
Yoakum County	501	Plains	November 19, 1876	Bexar County	Henderson King Yoakum (1810–1856), soldier, attorney, and Texas historian	7,438	800 sq mi (2,072 km^{2})	State map highlighting Yoakum County
Young County	503	Graham	February 2, 1856	Bosque County and Fannin County	William Cocke Young, early Texas settler, attorney, sheriff, and United States Marshal	18,154	922 sq mi (2,388 km^{2})	State map highlighting Young County
Zapata County	505	Zapata	January 22, 1858	Starr County and Webb County	José Antonio Zapata, a local rancher and colonel of the short-lived Republic of the Rio Grande	13,753	997 sq mi (2,582 km^{2})	State map highlighting Zapata County
Zavala County	507	Crystal City	February 1, 1858	Maverick County	Lorenzo de Zavala (1788–1836), signer of the Texas Declaration of Independence and the first Vice-President of the Republic of Texas	9,037	1,299 sq mi (3,364 km^{2})	State map highlighting Zavala County

== Racial / Ethnic Profile of counties in Texas (2020 Census) ==
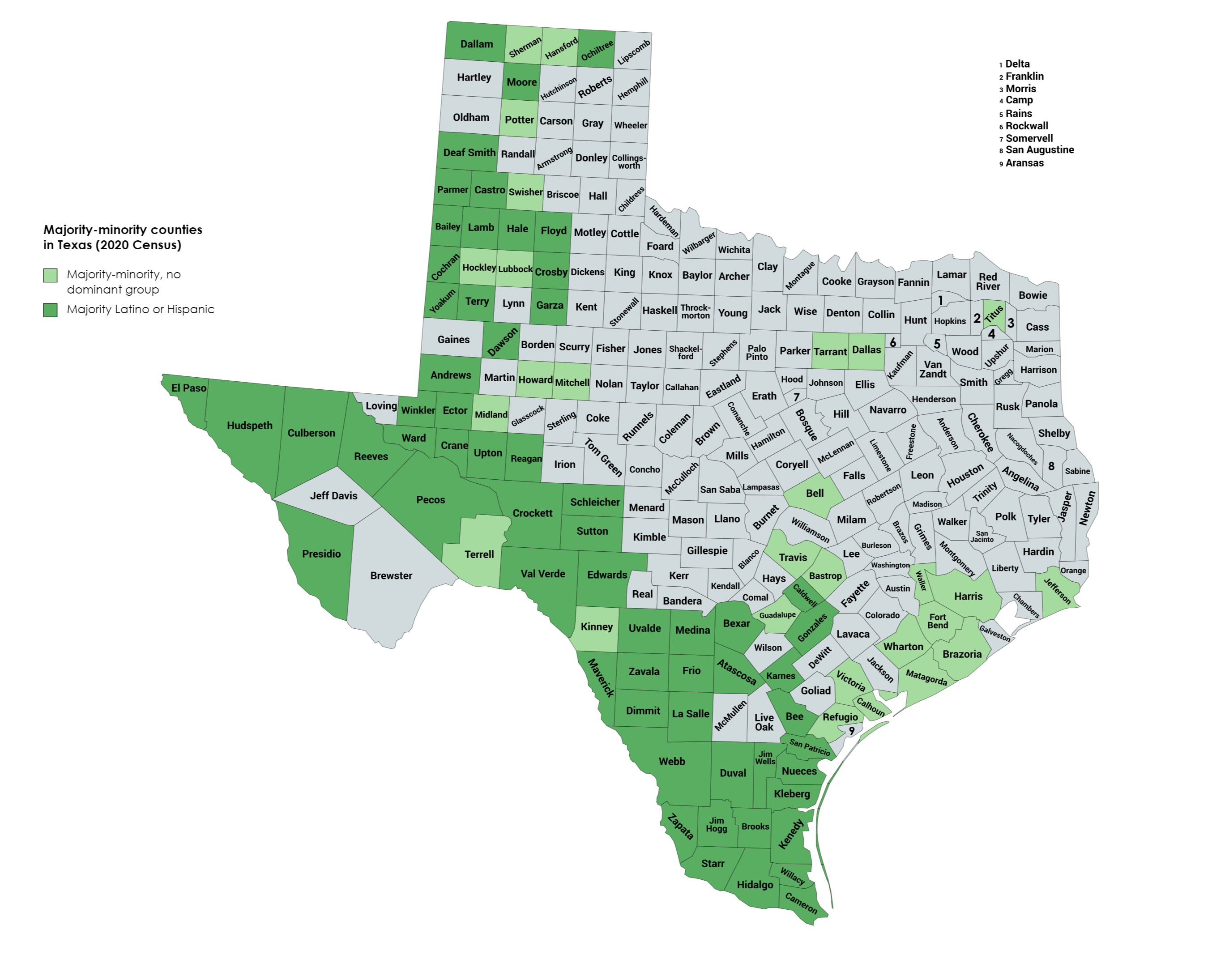
Majority minority counties in Texas derived from the 2020 U.S. census

Racial / Ethnic Profile of counties in Texas (2020 Census)
Following is a table of counties in Texas. Data for the United States (with and without Puerto Rico) and the state of Texas has been included for comparison purposes.
The majority racial/ethnic group is coded per the key below.

Majority minority with no dominant group
Majority White
Majority Black
Majority Hispanic
Majority Asian

Racial and ethnic composition of counties in Texas (2020 Census) (NH = Non-Hispanic) Note: the US Census treats Hispanic/Latino as an ethnic category. This table excludes Latinos from the racial categories and assigns them to a separate category. Hispanics/Latinos may be of any race.
County	Location of County	Total Population	White alone (NH)	%	Black or African American alone (NH)	%	Native American or Alaska Native alone (NH)	%	Asian alone (NH)	%	Pacific Islander alone (NH)	%	Other race alone (NH)	%	Mixed race or Multiracial (NH)	%	Hispanic or Latino (any race)	%
Anderson		57,922	33,098	57.14%	11,430	19.73%	193	0.33%	381	0.66%	13	0.02%	113	0.20%	1,583	2.73%	11,111	19.18%
Andrews		18,610	7,405	39.79%	192	1.03%	95	0.52%	102	0.55%	0	0.00%	49	0.26%	366	1.97%	10,400	55.88%
Angelina		86,395	49,970	57.84%	12,872	14.90%	200	0.23%	891	1.03%	30	0.03%	196	0.23%	2,504	2.90%	19,732	22.84%
Aransas		23,830	15,816	66.37%	241	1.01%	142	0.60%	480	2.01%	15	0.06%	78	0.33%	900	3.78%	6,158	25.84%
Archer		8,560	7,356	85.93%	30	0.35%	71	0.83%	18	0.21%	0	0.00%	21	0.25%	322	3.76%	742	8.67%
Armstrong		1,848	1,593	86.20%	6	0.32%	17	0.92%	10	0.54%	0	0.00%	2	0.11%	76	4.11%	144	7.79%
Atascosa		48,981	16,066	32.80%	340	0.69%	116	0.24%	170	0.35%	15	0.03%	177	0.36%	919	1.88%	31,178	63.65%
Austin		30,167	18,480	61.26%	2,352	7.80%	78	0.26%	201	0.67%	8	0.03%	107	0.35%	889	2.95%	8,052	26.69%
Bailey		6,904	2,190	31.72%	49	0.71%	24	0.35%	8	0.12%	0	0.00%	27	0.39%	66	0.96%	4,540	65.76%
Bandera		20,851	15,595	74.79%	102	0.49%	101	0.48%	95	0.46%	11	0.05%	71	0.34%	866	4.15%	4,010	19.23%
Bastrop		97,216	45,751	47.06%	5,460	5.62%	312	0.32%	718	0.74%	63	0.06%	417	0.43%	3,011	3.10%	41,484	42.67%
Baylor		3,465	2,797	80.72%	52	1.50%	11	0.32%	9	0.26%	0	0.00%	8	0.23%	149	4.30%	439	12.67%
Bee		31,047	8,600	27.70%	2,316	7.46%	54	0.17%	211	0.68%	2	0.01%	65	0.21%	407	1.31%	19,392	62.46%
Bell		370,647	156,780	42.30%	80,759	21.79%	1,448	0.39%	10,884	2.94%	3,454	0.93%	2,063	0.56%	21,792	5.88%	93,467	25.22%
Bexar		2,009,324	535,732	26.66%	147,875	7.36%	4,554	0.23%	65,127	3.25%	2,726	0.14%	8,218	0.41%	54,044	2.69%	1,190,958	59.27%
Blanco		11,374	8,707	76.55%	68	0.60%	36	0.32%	38	0.33%	0	0.00%	70	0.62%	363	3.19%	2,092	18.39%
Borden		631	528	83.68%	1	0.16%	0	0.00%	0	0.00%	0	0.00%	1	0.16%	15	2.38%	86	13.63%
Bosque		18,235	13,621	74.70%	244	1.34%	83	0.46%	80	0.44%	3	0.02%	29	0.16%	854	4.68%	3,321	18.21%
Bowie		92,893	55,855	60.13%	23,084	24.85%	554	0.60%	1,082	1.16%	69	0.07%	332	0.36%	4,315	4.65%	7,602	8.18%
Brazoria		372,031	161,833	43.50%	53,668	14.43%	1,022	0.27%	26,231	7.05%	129	0.03%	1,374	0.37%	12,572	3.38%	115,202	30.97%
Brazos		233,849	123,035	52.61%	23,569	10.08%	502	0.21%	14,621	6.25%	210	0.09%	1,009	0.43%	7,836	3.35%	63,067	26.97%
Brewster		9,546	4,948	51.83%	162	1.70%	30	0.31%	94	0.98%	11	0.12%	56	0.59%	282	2.95%	3,963	41.51%
Briscoe		1,435	1,008	70.24%	17	1.18%	4	0.28%	0	0.00%	0	0.00%	3	0.21%	35	2.44%	368	25.64%
Brooks		7,076	724	10.23%	8	0.11%	9	0.13%	29	0.41%	0	0.00%	12	0.17%	52	0.73%	6,242	88.21%
Brown		38,095	26,672	70.01%	1,353	3.55%	134	0.35%	269	0.71%	27	0.07%	96	0.25%	1,333	3.50%	8,211	21.55%
Burleson		17,642	11,258	63.81%	1,852	10.50%	65	0.37%	70	0.40%	0	0.00%	34	0.19%	651	3.69%	3,712	21.04%
Burnet		49,130	34,810	70.85%	579	1.18%	183	0.37%	424	0.86%	14	0.03%	147	0.30%	1,774	3.61%	11,199	22.79%
Caldwell		45,883	16,560	36.09%	2,225	4.85%	129	0.28%	227	0.49%	4	0.01%	178	0.39%	1,092	2.38%	25,468	55.51%
Calhoun		20,106	8,374	41.65%	361	1.80%	34	0.17%	1,112	5.53%	0	0.00%	56	0.28%	311	1.55%	9,858	49.03%
Callahan		13,708	11,555	84.29%	118	0.86%	66	0.48%	52	0.38%	7	0.05%	50	0.36%	554	4.04%	1,306	9.53%
Cameron		421,017	37,107	8.81%	1,405	0.33%	365	0.09%	2,596	0.62%	80	0.02%	846	0.20%	1,938	0.46%	376,680	89.47%
Camp		12,464	6,734	54.03%	1,877	15.06%	28	0.22%	105	0.84%	8	0.06%	34	0.27%	456	3.66%	3,222	25.85%
Carson		5,807	4,873	83.92%	19	0.33%	46	0.79%	19	0.33%	1	0.02%	7	0.12%	284	4.89%	558	9.61%
Cass		28,454	21,028	73.90%	4,518	15.88%	155	0.54%	119	0.42%	10	0.04%	86	0.30%	1,202	4.22%	1,336	4.70%
Castro		7,371	2,328	31.58%	95	1.29%	39	0.53%	22	0.30%	4	0.05%	9	0.12%	90	1.22%	4,784	64.90%
Chambers		46,571	29,858	64.11%	3,148	6.76%	161	0.35%	622	1.34%	0	0.00%	215	0.46%	1,615	3.47%	10,952	23.52%
Cherokee		50,412	30,095	59.70%	6,359	12.61%	128	0.25%	263	0.52%	18	0.04%	123	0.24%	1,629	3.23%	11,797	23.40%
Childress		6,664	3,852	57.80%	572	8.58%	20	0.30%	51	0.77%	2	0.03%	16	0.24%	209	3.14%	1,942	29.14%
Clay		10,218	8,941	87.50%	35	0.34%	78	0.76%	50	0.49%	0	0.00%	31	0.30%	442	4.33%	641	6.27%
Cochran		2,547	912	35.81%	62	2.43%	6	0.24%	0	0.00%	0	0.00%	0	0.00%	40	1.57%	1,527	59.95%
Coke		3,285	2,473	75.28%	7	0.21%	15	0.46%	1	0.03%	6	0.18%	6	0.18%	116	3.53%	661	20.12%
Coleman		7,684	6,013	78.25%	142	1.85%	36	0.47%	32	0.42%	0	0.00%	29	0.38%	240	3.12%	1,192	15.51%
Collin		1,064,465	542,472	50.96%	108,100	10.16%	3,874	0.36%	188,365	17.70%	613	0.06%	4,910	0.46%	46,973	4.41%	169,158	15.89%
Collingsworth		2,652	1,617	60.97%	108	4.07%	23	0.87%	7	0.26%	1	0.04%	0	0.00%	64	2.41%	832	31.37%
Colorado		20,557	11,761	57.21%	2,222	10.81%	13	0.06%	80	0.39%	0	0.00%	41	0.20%	450	2.19%	5,990	29.14%
Comal		161,501	105,250	65.17%	3,584	2.22%	514	0.32%	1,844	1.14%	127	0.08%	700	0.43%	5,892	3.65%	43,590	26.99%
Comanche		13,594	9,197	67.65%	39	0.29%	49	0.36%	38	0.28%	3	0.02%	24	0.18%	377	2.77%	3,867	28.45%
Concho		3,303	2,097	63.49%	69	2.09%	9	0.27%	19	0.58%	1	0.03%	16	0.48%	59	1.79%	1,033	31.27%
Cooke		41,668	29,404	70.57%	1,181	2.83%	360	0.86%	307	0.74%	13	0.03%	125	0.30%	1,759	4.22%	8,519	20.44%
Coryell		83,093	46,213	55.62%	11,760	14.15%	414	0.50%	1,816	2.19%	1,041	1.25%	389	0.47%	4,978	5.99%	16,482	19.84%
Cottle		1,380	902	65.36%	96	6.96%	2	0.14%	0	0.00%	1	0.07%	0	0.00%	52	3.77%	327	23.70%
Crane		4,675	1,342	28.71%	70	1.50%	14	0.30%	22	0.47%	0	0.00%	1	0.02%	68	1.45%	3,158	67.55%
Crockett		3,098	1,080	34.86%	18	0.58%	9	0.29%	10	0.32%	0	0.00%	9	0.29%	52	1.68%	1,920	61.98%
Crosby		5,133	2,076	40.44%	117	2.28%	8	0.16%	12	0.23%	0	0.00%	6	0.12%	85	1.66%	2,829	55.11%
Culberson		2,188	445	20.34%	20	0.91%	11	0.50%	28	1.28%	0	0.00%	3	0.14%	36	1.65%	1,645	75.18%
Dallam		7,115	3,119	43.84%	74	1.04%	51	0.72%	10	0.14%	3	0.04%	10	0.14%	141	1.98%	3,707	52.10%
Dallas		2,613,539	724,987	27.74%	564,741	21.61%	6,743	0.26%	181,314	6.94%	1,175	0.04%	9,990	0.38%	66,754	2.55%	1,057,835	40.48%
Dawson		12,456	4,590	36.85%	847	6.80%	23	0.18%	56	0.45%	4	0.03%	17	0.14%	152	1.22%	6,767	54.33%
Deaf Smith		18,583	4,233	22.78%	107	0.58%	47	0.25%	44	0.24%	0	0.00%	40	0.22%	187	1.01%	13,925	74.93%
Delta		5,230	4,189	80.10%	312	5.97%	42	0.80%	37	0.71%	5	0.10%	30	0.57%	221	4.23%	394	7.53%
Denton		906,422	485,646	53.58%	95,386	10.52%	3,582	0.40%	92,751	10.23%	650	0.07%	3,909	0.43%	41,720	4.60%	182,778	20.16%
DeWitt		19,824	10,854	54.75%	1,557	7.85%	32	0.16%	70	0.35%	2	0.01%	35	0.18%	384	1.94%	6,890	34.76%
Dickens		1,770	1,178	66.55%	18	1.02%	0	0.00%	1	0.06%	2	0.11%	7	0.40%	52	2.94%	512	28.93%
Dimmit		8,615	898	10.42%	72	0.84%	8	0.09%	68	0.79%	10	0.12%	12	0.14%	60	0.70%	7,487	86.91%
Donley		3,258	2,537	77.87%	167	5.13%	27	0.83%	10	0.31%	1	0.03%	6	0.18%	154	4.73%	356	10.93%
Duval		9,831	937	9.53%	145	1.47%	13	0.13%	45	0.46%	0	0.00%	8	0.08%	721	7.33%	7,962	80.99%
Eastland		17,725	13,653	77.03%	335	1.89%	96	0.54%	95	0.54%	16	0.09%	26	0.15%	570	3.22%	2,934	16.55%
Ector		165,171	51,023	30.89%	7,430	4.50%	568	0.34%	2,257	1.37%	327	0.20%	492	0.30%	3,023	1.83%	100,051	60.57%
Edwards		1,422	651	45.78%	2	0.14%	5	0.35%	11	0.77%	1	0.07%	2	0.14%	32	2.25%	718	50.49%
Ellis		192,455	106,495	55.34%	23,738	12.33%	710	0.37%	1,525	0.79%	202	0.10%	790	0.41%	6,963	3.62%	52,032	27.04%
El Paso		865,657	98,219	11.35%	24,415	2.82%	2,635	0.27%	10,692	1.24%	1,527	0.18%	2,422	0.28%	10,666	1.23%	715,351	82.64%
Erath		42,545	30,006	70.53%	1,194	2.81%	215	0.51%	348	0.82%	13	0.03%	104	0.24%	1,411	3.32%	9,254	21.75%
Falls		16,968	8,707	51.31%	3,708	21.85%	55	0.32%	51	0.30%	8	0.05%	42	0.25%	432	2.55%	3,965	23.37%
Fannin		35,662	27,042	75.83%	2,199	6.17%	309	0.87%	145	0.41%	20	0.06%	112	0.31%	1,617	4.53%	4,218	11.83%
Fayette		24,435	17,041	69.74%	1,383	5.66%	50	0.20%	67	0.27%	6	0.02%	72	0.29%	600	2.46%	5,216	21.35%
Fisher		3,672	2,496	67.97%	92	2.51%	15	0.41%	13	0.35%	2	0.05%	11	0.30%	70	1.91%	973	26.50%
Floyd		5,402	2,079	38.49%	125	2.31%	7	0.13%	12	0.22%	1	0.02%	13	0.24%	98	1.81%	3,067	56.78%
Foard		1,095	845	77.17%	19	1.74%	0	0.00%	3	0.27%	1	0.09%	2	0.18%	28	2.56%	197	17.99%
Fort Bend		822,779	243,726	29.62%	167,964	20.41%	1,269	0.15%	181,522	22.06%	276	0.03%	4,055	0.49%	25,387	3.09%	198,580	24.14%
Franklin		10,359	7,786	76.03%	394	3.80%	39	0.38%	68	0.66%	6	0.06%	61	0.59%	460	4.44%	1,455	14.05%
Freestone		19,435	12,817	65.95%	2,740	14.10%	64	0.33%	66	0.34%	11	0.06%	46	0.24%	536	2.76%	3,155	16.23%
Frio		18,385	3,053	16.61%	705	3.83%	49	0.27%	199	1.08%	9	0.05%	81	0.44%	118	0.64%	14,171	77.08%
Gaines		21,598	12,554	58.13%	241	1.12%	42	0.19%	72	0.33%	3	0.01%	46	0.21%	239	1.11%	8,401	38.90%
Galveston		350,682	191,358	54.57%	43,120	12.30%	1,036	0.30%	12,202	3.48%	223	0.06%	1,455	0.41%	12,652	3.61%	88,636	25.28%
Garza		5,816	2,162	37.17%	230	3.95%	28	0.48%	25	0.43%	0	0.00%	10	0.17%	89	1.53%	3,272	56.26%
Gillespie		26,725	19,884	74.40%	84	0.31%	69	0.26%	127	0.48%	1	0.00%	100	0.37%	694	2.60%	5,766	21.58%
Glasscock		1,116	710	63.62%	8	0.72%	0	0.00%	0	0.00%	3	0.27%	0	0.00%	8	0.72%	387	34.68%
Goliad		7,012	4,246	60.55%	235	3.35%	18	0.26%	24	0.34%	0	0.00%	16	0.23%	185	2.64%	2,288	32.63%
Gonzales		19,653	8,159	41.52%	1,075	5.47%	41	0.21%	63	0.32%	6	0.03%	45	0.23%	367	1.87%	9,897	50.36%
Gray		21,227	13,025	61.36%	835	3.93%	141	0.66%	127	0.60%	0	0.00%	37	0.17%	715	3.37%	6,347	29.90%
Grayson		135,543	95,211	70.24%	7,448	5.49%	1,876	1.38%	1,958	1.44%	58	0.04%	348	0.26%	7,776	5.74%	20,868	15.40%
Gregg		124,239	68,050	54.77%	24,974	20.10%	424	0.34%	1,614	1.30%	47	0.04%	298	0.24%	4,792	3.86%	24,040	19.35%
Grimes		29,268	16,910	57.78%	3,824	13.07%	85	0.29%	102	0.35%	8	0.03%	84	0.29%	894	3.05%	7,361	25.15%
Guadalupe		172,706	84,063	48.67%	11,947	6.92%	476	0.28%	3,066	1.78%	353	0.20%	774	0.45%	6,794	3.93%	65,233	37.77%
Hale		32,522	10,693	32.88%	1,381	4.25%	99	0.30%	149	0.46%	30	0.09%	69	0.21%	612	1.88%	19,489	59.93%
Hall		2,825	1,589	56.25%	190	6.73%	7	0.25%	9	0.32%	0	0.00%	3	0.11%	77	2.73%	950	33.63%
Hamilton		8,222	6,805	82.77%	32	0.39%	37	0.45%	36	0.44%	2	0.02%	17	0.21%	248	3.02%	1,045	12.71%
Hansford		5,285	2,552	48.29%	12	0.23%	16	0.30%	9	0.17%	3	0.06%	18	0.34%	60	1.14%	2,615	49.48%
Hardeman		3,549	2,441	68.78%	130	3.66%	14	0.39%	18	0.51%	1	0.03%	7	0.20%	120	3.38%	818	23.05%
Hardin		56,231	46,934	83.47%	3,037	5.40%	190	0.34%	399	0.71%	34	0.06%	149	0.26%	2,071	3.68%	3,417	6.08%
Harris		4,731,145	1,309,593	27.68%	885,517	18.72%	8,432	0.18%	344,762	7.29%	3,199	0.07%	23,262	0.49%	121,671	2.57%	2,034,709	43.01%
Harrison		68,839	42,039	61.07%	13,448	19.54%	294	0.43%	483	0.70%	28	0.04%	267	0.39%	2,441	3.55%	9,839	14.29%
Hartley		5,382	3,403	63.23%	191	3.55%	15	0.28%	24	0.45%	5	0.09%	1	0.02%	112	2.08%	1,631	30.30%
Haskell		5,416	3,628	66.99%	181	3.34%	28	0.52%	22	0.41%	5	0.09%	24	0.44%	151	2.79%	1,377	25.42%
Hays		241,067	121,568	50.43%	9,004	3.74%	599	0.25%	4,822	2.00%	144	0.06%	1,009	0.42%	11,050	4.58%	92,871	38.52%
Hemphill		3,382	2,090	61.80%	4	0.12%	18	0.53%	10	0.30%	0	0.00%	4	0.12%	119	3.52%	1,137	33.62%
Henderson		82,150	61,854	75.29%	4,705	5.73%	414	0.50%	510	0.62%	31	0.04%	211	0.26%	3,183	3.87%	11,242	13.68%
Hidalgo		870,781	53,338	6.13%	3,364	0.39%	635	0.07%	8,604	0.99%	78	0.01%	1,915	0.22%	2,846	0.33%	800,001	91.87%
Hill		35,874	24,123	67.24%	2,055	5.73%	137	0.38%	188	0.52%	15	0.04%	87	0.24%	1,385	3.86%	7,884	21.98%
Hockley		21,537	9,752	45.28%	565	2.62%	82	0.38%	49	0.23%	4	0.02%	59	0.27%	402	1.87%	10,624	49.33%
Hood		61,598	49,815	80.87%	495	0.80%	340	0.55%	468	0.76%	53	0.09%	180	0.29%	2,289	3.72%	7,958	12.92%
Hopkins		36,787	25,976	70.61%	2,373	6.45%	198	0.54%	277	0.75%	4	0.01%	85	0.23%	1,390	3.78%	6,484	17.63%
Houston		22,066	12,957	58.72%	5,163	23.40%	94	0.43%	138	0.63%	8	0.04%	58	0.26%	577	2.61%	3,071	13.92%
Howard		34,860	15,672	44.96%	1,520	4.36%	211	0.61%	386	1.11%	12	0.03%	68	0.20%	817	2.34%	16,174	46.40%
Hudspeth		3,202	1,094	34.17%	6	0.19%	6	0.19%	10	0.31%	0	0.00%	7	0.22%	43	1.34%	2,036	63.59%
Hunt		99,956	65,598	65.63%	7,812	7.82%	722	0.72%	979	0.98%	151	0.15%	301	0.30%	4,720	4.72%	19,673	19.68%
Hutchinson		20,617	13,783	66.85%	416	2.02%	273	1.32%	105	0.51%	2	0.01%	52	0.25%	1,025	4.97%	4,961	24.06%
Irion		1,513	1,112	73.50%	6	0.40%	9	0.59%	0	0.00%	1	0.07%	1	0.07%	35	2.31%	349	23.07%
Jack		8,472	6,358	75.05%	294	3.47%	35	0.41%	41	0.48%	5	0.06%	9	0.11%	209	2.47%	1,521	17.95%
Jackson		14,988	8,510	56.78%	937	6.25%	36	0.24%	158	1.05%	5	0.03%	102	0.68%	411	2.74%	4,829	32.22%
Jasper		32,980	23,795	72.15%	5,572	16.90%	127	0.39%	114	0.35%	16	0.05%	72	0.22%	1,086	3.29%	2,198	6.66%
Jeff Davis		1,996	1,282	64.23%	0	0.00%	6	0.30%	14	0.70%	0	0.00%	15	0.75%	66	3.31%	613	30.71%
Jefferson		256,526	96,047	37.44%	83,856	32.69%	622	0.24%	9,943	3.88%	66	0.03%	867	0.34%	6,210	2.42%	58,915	22.97%
Jim Hogg		4,838	414	8.56%	5	0.10%	15	0.31%	26	0.54%	5	0.10%	8	0.17%	84	1.74%	4,281	88.49%
Jim Wells		38,891	6,963	17.90%	180	0.46%	58	0.15%	140	0.36%	15	0.04%	95	0.24%	605	1.56%	30,835	79.29%
Johnson		179,927	119,226	66.26%	6,446	3.58%	840	0.47%	1,726	0.96%	929	0.52%	612	0.34%	7,535	4.19%	42,613	23.68%
Jones		19,663	11,485	58.41%	1,978	10.06%	66	0.34%	111	0.56%	4	0.02%	41	0.21%	474	2.41%	5,504	27.99%
Karnes		14,710	5,388	36.63%	1,116	7.59%	26	0.18%	145	0.99%	1	0.01%	61	0.41%	239	1.62%	7,734	52.58%
Kaufman		145,310	78,626	54.11%	21,541	14.82%	623	0.43%	2,107	1.45%	70	0.05%	435	0.30%	5,743	3.95%	36,168	24.89%
Kendall		44,279	31,767	71.74%	315	0.71%	138	0.31%	355	0.80%	36	0.08%	202	0.46%	1,437	3.25%	10,029	22.65%
Kenedy		350	73	20.86%	0	0.00%	7	2.00%	0	0.00%	1	0.29%	2	0.57%	6	1.71%	261	74.57%
Kent		753	657	87.25%	2	0.27%	3	0.40%	0	0.00%	0	0.00%	3	0.40%	7	0.93%	81	10.76%
Kerr		52,598	35,791	68.05%	690	1.31%	156	0.30%	576	1.10%	39	0.07%	187	0.36%	1,561	2.97%	13,598	25.85%
Kimble		4,286	3,136	73.17%	8	0.19%	14	0.33%	33	0.77%	3	0.07%	8	0.19%	98	2.29%	986	23.01%
King		265	230	86.79%	0	0.00%	0	0.00%	0	0.00%	4	1.51%	0	0.00%	6	2.26%	25	9.43%
Kinney		3,129	1,489	47.59%	36	1.15%	21	0.67%	10	0.32%	2	0.06%	15	0.48%	86	2.75%	1,470	46.98%
Kleberg		31,040	6,728	21.68%	995	3.21%	83	0.27%	784	2.53%	1	0.00%	97	0.31%	432	1.39%	21,920	70.62%
Knox		3,353	1,935	57.71%	146	4.35%	8	0.24%	24	0.72%	3	0.09%	5	0.15%	102	3.04%	1,130	33.70%
La Salle		6,664	1,467	22.01%	221	3.32%	3	0.05%	4	0.06%	0	0.00%	5	0.08%	56	0.84%	4,908	73.65%
Lamar		50,088	35,354	70.58%	6,378	12.73%	751	1.50%	474	0.95%	25	0.05%	119	0.24%	2,575	5.14%	4,412	8.81%
Lamb		13,045	4,981	38.18%	392	3.00%	15	0.11%	4	0.03%	5	0.04%	24	0.18%	175	1.34%	7,449	57.10%
Lampasas		21,627	15,132	69.97%	700	3.24%	115	0.53%	242	1.12%	86	0.40%	100	0.46%	1,073	4.96%	4,179	19.32%
Lavaca		20,337	14,564	71.61%	1,173	5.77%	30	0.15%	74	0.36%	5	0.02%	31	0.15%	524	2.58%	3,936	19.35%
Lee		17,478	10,612	60.72%	1,631	9.33%	47	0.27%	57	0.33%	1	0.01%	37	0.21%	614	3.51%	4,479	25.63%
Leon		15,719	11,659	74.17%	921	5.86%	54	0.34%	111	0.71%	6	0.04%	47	0.30%	475	3.02%	2,446	15.56%
Liberty		91,628	50,044	54.62%	7,024	7.67%	291	0.32%	466	0.51%	12	0.01%	329	0.36%	2,665	2.91%	30,797	33.61%
Limestone		22,146	12,530	56.58%	3,636	16.42%	72	0.33%	160	0.72%	18	0.08%	60	0.27%	657	2.97%	5,013	22.64%
Lipscomb		3,059	1,786	58.39%	4	0.13%	29	0.95%	2	0.07%	0	0.00%	4	0.13%	111	3.63%	1,123	36.71%
Live Oak		11,335	5,968	52.65%	205	1.81%	49	0.43%	35	0.31%	3	0.03%	45	0.40%	240	2.12%	4,790	42.26%
Llano		21,243	17,530	82.52%	97	0.46%	115	0.54%	121	0.57%	4	0.02%	61	0.29%	807	3.80%	2,508	11.81%
Loving		64	56	87.50%	0	0.00%	1	1.56%	0	0.00%	0	0.00%	1	1.56%	5	7.81%	1	1.56%
Lubbock		310,639	154,994	49.90%	25,663	8.26%	1,436	0.46%	9,490	3.05%	180	0.06%	968	0.31%	8,738	2.81%	109,170	35.14%
Lynn		5,596	2,960	52.89%	105	1.88%	15	0.27%	10	0.18%	4	0.07%	12	0.21%	138	2.47%	2,352	42.03%
Madison		13,455	6,984	51.91%	2,587	19.23%	48	0.36%	101	0.75%	0	0.00%	11	0.08%	309	2.30%	3,415	25.38%
Marion		9,725	6,869	70.63%	1,846	18.98%	69	0.71%	48	0.49%	0	0.00%	45	0.46%	459	4.72%	389	4.00%
Martin		5,237	2,780	53.08%	81	1.55%	22	0.42%	9	0.17%	1	0.02%	19	0.36%	70	1.34%	2,255	43.06%
Mason		3,953	2,948	74.58%	4	0.10%	0	0.00%	2	0.05%	0	0.00%	16	0.40%	100	2.53%	883	22.34%
Matagorda		36,255	15,355	42.35%	3,734	10.30%	99	0.27%	700	1.93%	7	0.02%	103	0.28%	802	2.21%	15,455	42.63%
Maverick		57,887	1,574	2.72%	129	0.22%	835	1.44%	182	0.31%	4	0.01%	110	0.19%	117	0.20%	54,936	94.90%
McCulloch		7,630	4,904	64.27%	92	1.21%	7	0.09%	39	0.51%	0	0.00%	12	0.16%	207	2.71%	2,369	31.05%
McLennan		260,579	139,693	53.61%	36,130	13.87%	901	0.35%	4,873	1.87%	146	0.06%	1,065	0.41%	9,184	3.52%	68,587	26.32%
McMullen		600	353	58.83%	1	0.17%	1	0.17%	3	0.50%	5	0.83%	0	0.00%	13	2.17%	22	37.33%
Medina		50,748	22,324	43.99%	1,252	2.47%	158	0.31%	215	0.42%	38	0.07%	188	0.37%	1,118	2.20%	25,455	50.16%
Menard		1,962	1,231	62.74%	12	0.61%	7	0.36%	5	0.25%	3	0.15%	8	0.41%	34	1.73%	662	33.74%
Midland		169,983	76,487	45.00%	10,465	6.16%	686	0.40%	3,891	2.29%	152	0.09%	621	0.37%	4,350	2.56%	73,331	43.14%
Milam		24,754	15,367	62.08%	2,097	8.47%	67	0.27%	111	0.45%	11	0.04%	84	0.34%	753	3.04%	6,264	25.31%
Mills		4,456	3,498	78.50%	25	0.56%	10	0.22%	4	0.09%	0	0.00%	6	0.13%	185	4.15%	728	16.34%
Mitchell		8,990	4,328	48.14%	925	10.29%	34	0.38%	54	0.60%	1	0.01%	11	0.12%	183	2.04%	3,454	38.42%
Montague		19,965	16,342	81.85%	73	0.37%	155	0.78%	84	0.42%	4	0.02%	34	0.17%	912	4.57%	2,361	11.83%
Montgomery		620,443	371,403	59.86%	34,177	5.51%	1,884	0.30%	21,436	3.45%	634	0.10%	2,522	0.41%	24,928	3.92%	164,089	26.45%
Moore		21,358	6,499	30.43%	654	3.06%	97	0.45%	982	4.60%	1	0.00%	83	0.39%	395	1.85%	12,647	59.21%
Morris		11,973	7,716	64.45%	2,448	20.45%	70	0.58%	35	0.29%	9	0.08%	30	0.25%	483	4.03%	1,182	9.87%
Motley		1,063	858	80.71%	7	0.66%	0	0.00%	0	0.00%	0	0.00%	2	0.19%	43	4.05%	153	14.39%
Nacogdoches		64,653	37,158	57.47%	10,567	16.34%	191	0.30%	760	1.18%	10	0.02%	190	0.29%	2,180	3.37%	13,597	21.03%
Navarro		52,624	26,996	51.30%	6,286	11.95%	163	0.31%	393	0.75%	734	1.39%	137	0.26%	1,866	3.55%	16,049	30.50%
Newton		12,217	9,249	75.71%	2,075	16.98%	59	0.48%	24	0.20%	0	0.00%	27	0.22%	439	3.59%	344	2.82%
Nolan		14,738	8,138	55.22%	625	4.24%	53	0.36%	103	0.70%	2	0.01%	31	0.21%	432	2.93%	5,354	36.33%
Nueces		353,178	106,165	30.06%	12,651	3.58%	907	0.26%	7,712	2.18%	281	0.08%	1,264	0.36%	7,146	2.02%	217,052	64.46%
Ochiltree		10,015	4,245	42.39%	14	0.14%	31	0.31%	28	0.28%	2	0.02%	21	0.21%	204	2.04%	5,470	54.62%
Oldham		1,758	1,325	75.37%	33	1.88%	6	0.34%	10	0.57%	0	0.00%	0	0.00%	71	4.04%	313	17.80%
Orange		84,808	64,935	76.57%	7,981	9.41%	343	0.40%	1,108	1.31%	13	0.02%	196	0.23%	2,967	3.50%	7,265	8.57%
Palo Pinto		28,409	20,778	73.14%	552	1.94%	149	0.52%	211	0.74%	12	0.04%	69	0.24%	1,024	3.60%	5,614	19.76%
Panola		22,491	16,098	71.58%	3,244	14.42%	96	0.43%	99	0.44%	7	0.03%	26	0.12%	731	3.25%	2,190	9.74%
Parker		148,222	117,747	79.44%	1,636	1.10%	878	0.59%	990	0.67%	97	0.07%	470	0.32%	6,585	4.44%	19,819	13.37%
Parmer		9,869	3,187	32.29%	53	0.54%	11	0.11%	14	0.14%	0	0.00%	39	0.40%	61	0.62%	6,504	65.90%
Pecos		15,193	3,473	22.86%	505	3.32%	33	0.22%	143	0.94%	0	0.00%	35	0.23%	159	1.05%	10,845	71.38%
Polk		50,123	34,808	69.45%	4,869	9.71%	914	1.82%	340	0.68%	0	0.00%	135	0.27%	1,712	3.42%	7,345	14.65%
Potter		118,525	50,153	42.31%	11,999	10.12%	636	0.54%	6,036	5.09%	20	0.02%	613	0.52%	3,875	3.27%	45,193	38.13%
Presidio		6,131	961	15.67%	25	0.41%	16	0.26%	85	1.39%	0	0.00%	9	0.15%	44	0.72%	4,991	81.41%
Rains		50,123	34,808	69.45%	4,869	9.71%	914	1.82%	340	0.68%	0	0.00%	135	0.27%	1,712	3.42%	7,345	14.65%
Randall		140,753	95,457	67.82%	4,567	3.24%	794	0.56%	2,604	1.85%	54	0.04%	412	0.29%	5,282	3.75%	31,583	22.44%
Reagan		3,385	968	28.60%	33	0.97%	12	0.35%	19	0.56%	1	0.03%	6	0.18%	63	1.86%	2,283	67.44%
Real		2,758	1,940	70.34%	22	0.80%	8	0.29%	12	0.44%	3	0.11%	2	0.07%	79	2.86%	692	25.09%
Red River		11,587	8,499	73.35%	1,738	15.00%	102	0.88%	51	0.44%	0	0.00%	13	0.11%	418	3.61%	766	6.61%
Reeves		14,748	1,697	11.51%	224	1.52%	27	0.18%	165	1.12%	3	0.02%	39	0.26%	83	0.56%	12,510	84.83%
Refugio		6,741	2,864	42.49%	400	5.93%	18	0.27%	27	0.40%	0	0.00%	12	0.18%	114	1.69%	3,306	49.04%
Roberts		827	717	86.70%	2	0.24%	2	0.24%	0	0.00%	0	0.00%	1	0.12%	55	6.65%	50	6.05%
Robertson		16,757	9,505	56.72%	3,095	18.47%	29	0.17%	104	0.62%	21	0.13%	37	0.22%	55	0.33%	3,528	21.05%
Rockwall		107,819	70,198	65.11%	8,179	7.59%	479	0.44%	3,306	3.07%	75	0.07%	344	0.32%	4,678	4.34%	20,560	19.07%
Runnels		9,900	6,062	61.23%	132	1.33%	39	0.39%	24	0.24%	6	0.06%	15	0.15%	268	2.71%	3,354	33.88%
Rusk		52,214	32,022	61.33%	8,240	15.78%	195	0.37%	231	0.44%	18	0.03%	162	0.31%	1,767	3.38%	9,579	18.35%
Sabine		9,894	8,307	83.96%	734	7.42%	51	0.52%	52	0.53%	0	0.00%	35	0.35%	322	3.25%	393	3.97%
San Augustine		7,918	5,270	66.56%	1,768	22.33%	19	0.24%	36	0.45%	0	0.00%	0	0.00%	186	2.35%	639	8.07%
San Jacinto		27,402	19,170	69.96%	2,083	7.60%	123	0.45%	86	0.31%	15	0.05%	74	0.27%	1,029	3.76%	4,822	17.60%
San Patricio		68,755	26,613	38.71%	994	1.45%	198	0.29%	845	1.23%	66	0.10%	227	0.33%	1,592	2.32%	38,220	55.59%
San Saba		5,730	3,690	64.40%	106	1.85%	29	0.51%	16	0.28%	1	0.02%	10	0.17%	129	2.25%	1,749	30.52%
Schleicher		2,451	1,102	44.96%	15	0.61%	4	0.16%	7	0.29%	2	0.08%	10	0.41%	36	1.47%	1,275	52.02%
Scurry		16,932	8,637	51.01%	599	3.54%	60	0.35%	82	0.48%	5	0.03%	27	0.16%	383	2.26%	7,139	42.16%
Shackelford		3,105	2,612	84.12%	20	0.64%	6	0.19%	14	0.45%	0	0.00%	2	0.06%	88	2.83%	363	11.69%
Shelby		24,022	14,416	60.01%	3,805	15.84%	50	0.21%	364	1.52%	14	0.06%	49	0.20%	639	2.66%	4,685	19.50%
Sherman		2,782	1,362	48.96%	10	0.36%	5	0.18%	2	0.07%	0	0.00%	6	0.22%	82	2.95%	1,315	47.27%
Smith		233,479	134,452	57.59%	38,003	16.28%	746	0.32%	4,129	1.77%	77	0.03%	695	0.30%	8,096	3.47%	47,281	20.25%
Somervell		9,205	7,011	76.17%	39	0.42%	49	0.53%	55	0.60%	0	0.00%	33	0.36%	331	3.60%	1,687	18.33%
Starr		65,920	1,171	1.78%	31	0.05%	8	0.01%	100	0.15%	0	0.00%	98	0.15%	119	0.18%	64,393	97.68%
Stephens		9,101	6,256	68.74%	237	2.60%	36	0.40%	60	0.66%	1	0.01%	27	0.30%	280	3.08%	2,204	24.22%
Sterling		1,372	867	63.19%	3	0.22%	4	0.29%	1	0.07%	2	0.15%	2	0.15%	44	3.21%	449	32.73%
Stonewall		1,245	958	76.95%	18	1.45%	3	0.24%	5	0.40%	0	0.00%	2	0.16%	33	2.65%	226	18.15%
Sutton		3,372	1,200	35.59%	6	0.18%	5	0.15%	6	0.18%	0	0.00%	14	0.42%	48	1.42%	2,093	62.07%
Swisher		6,971	3,219	46.18%	407	5.84%	18	0.26%	10	0.14%	0	0.00%	8	0.11%	162	2.32%	3,147	45.14%
Tarrant		2,110,640	904,884	42.87%	358,645	16.99%	7,033	0.33%	127,783	6.05%	4,147	0.20%	8,321	0.39%	78,920	3.74%	620,907	29.42%
Taylor		143,208	87,316	60.97%	10,980	7.67%	589	0.41%	2,815	1.97%	161	0.11%	468	0.33%	6,123	4.28%	34,756	24.27%
Terrell		760	352	46.32%	8	1.05%	0	0.00%	5	0.66%	0	0.00%	2	0.26%	23	3.03%	370	48.68%
Terry		11,831	4,599	38.87%	389	3.29%	29	0.25%	37	0.31%	0	0.00%	24	0.20%	184	1.56%	6,569	55.52%
Throckmorton		1,440	1,248	86.67%	1	0.07%	3	0.21%	3	0.21%	0	0.00%	0	0.00%	40	2.78%	145	10.07%
Titus		31,247	13,410	42.92%	2,884	9.23%	101	0.32%	262	0.84%	3	0.01%	73	0.23%	834	2.67%	13,680	43.78%
Tom Green		120,003	62,390	51.99%	4,010	3.34%	366	0.30%	1,704	1.42%	143	0.12%	369	0.31%	3,955	3.30%	47,066	39.22%
Travis		1,290,188	612,824	47.50%	96,270	7.46%	2,762	0.21%	99,660	7.72%	774	0.06%	6,513	0.50%	50,275	3.90%	421,110	32.64%
Trinity		13,602	10,533	77.44%	1,086	7.98%	29	0.21%	30	0.22%	4	0.03%	33	0.24%	573	4.21%	1,314	9.66%
Tyler		19,798	15,302	77.29%	2,040	10.30%	111	0.56%	97	0.49%	3	0.02%	47	0.24%	678	3.42%	1,520	7.68%
Upshur		40,892	31,287	76.51%	2,908	7.11%	261	0.64%	177	0.43%	9	0.02%	150	0.37%	2,114	5.17%	3,986	9.75%
Upton		3,308	1,318	39.84%	59	1.78%	11	0.33%	4	0.12%	0	0.00%	3	0.09%	116	3.51%	1,797	54.32%
Uvalde		24,564	6,613	26.92%	107	0.44%	25	0.10%	158	0.64%	6	0.02%	66	0.27%	272	1.11%	17,317	70.50%
Val Verde		47,586	7,836	16.47%	538	1.13%	57	0.12%	351	0.74%	35	0.07%	85	0.18%	477	1.00%	38,207	80.29%
Van Zandt		59,541	47,986	80.59%	1,517	2.55%	328	0.55%	272	0.46%	30	0.05%	133	0.22%	2,204	3.70%	7,071	11.88%
Victoria		91,319	39,330	43.07%	5,230	5.73%	214	0.23%	1,391	1.52%	35	0.04%	232	0.25%	1,956	2.14%	42,931	47.01%
Walker		76,400	39,823	52.12%	16,382	21.44%	251	0.33%	1,126	1.47%	39	0.05%	318	0.42%	1,883	2.46%	16,578	21.70%
Waller		56,794	23,494	41.37%	12,104	21.31%	210	0.37%	785	1.38%	10	0.02%	314	0.55%	1,391	2.45%	18,486	32.55%
Ward		11,644	4,506	38.70%	415	3.56%	41	0.35%	69	0.59%	2	0.02%	22	0.19%	264	2.27%	6,325	54.32%
Washington		35,805	22,023	61.51%	5,555	15.51%	75	0.21%	547	1.53%	14	0.04%	140	0.39%	1,026	2.87%	6,425	17.94%
Webb		267,114	9,495	3.55%	788	0.30%	135	0.05%	1,300	0.49%	25	0.01%	458	0.17%	559	0.21%	254,354	95.22%
Wharton		41,570	18,130	43.61%	5,469	13.16%	69	0.17%	164	0.39%	0	0.00%	104	0.25%	667	1.60%	16,967	40.82%
Wheeler		4,990	3,469	69.52%	81	1.62%	33	0.66%	24	0.48%	2	0.04%	12	0.24%	142	2.85%	1,227	24.59%
Wichita		129,350	79,694	61.61%	13,379	10.34%	992	0.77%	2,647	2.05%	140	0.11%	476	0.37%	6,219	4.81%	25,803	19.95%
Wilbarger		12,887	7,012	54.41%	1,013	7.86%	96	0.74%	566	4.39%	0	0.00%	32	0.25%	434	3.37%	3,734	28.97%
Willacy		20,164	1,805	8.95%	445	2.21%	47	0.23%	160	0.79%	2	0.01%	34	0.17%	60	0.30%	17,611	87.34%
Williamson		609,017	336,410	55.24%	38,557	6.33%	1,659	0.27%	53,982	8.86%	592	0.10%	3,124	0.51%	27,605	4.53%	147,088	24.15%
Wilson		49,753	27,877	56.03%	693	1.39%	148	0.30%	229	0.46%	24	0.05%	187	0.38%	1,363	2.74%	19,232	38.65%
Winkler		7,791	2,702	34.68%	139	1.78%	38	0.49%	77	0.99%	0	0.00%	9	0.12%	94	1.21%	4,732	60.74%
Wise		68,632	50,495	73.57%	657	0.96%	474	0.69%	372	0.54%	12	0.02%	172	0.25%	2,756	4.02%	13,694	19.95%
Wood		44,843	35,906	80.07%	1,658	3.70%	227	0.51%	230	0.51%	1	0.00%	138	0.31%	1,789	3.99%	4,894	10.91%
Yoakum		7,694	2,488	32.34%	55	0.71%	22	0.29%	46	0.60%	0	0.00%	15	0.19%	100	1.30%	4,968	64.57%
Young		17,867	13,409	75.05%	174	0.97%	79	0.44%	86	0.48%	0	0.00%	38	0.21%	573	3.21%	3,508	19.63%
Zapata		13,889	796	5.73%	9	0.06%	7	0.05%	16	0.12%	0	0.00%	16	0.12%	46	0.33%	12,999	93.59%
Zavala		9,670	572	5.92%	67	0.69%	21	0.22%	19	0.20%	1	0.01%	3	0.03%	43	0.44%	8,944	92.49%
United States (50 states and DC)		331,449,281	191,697,647	57.84%	39,940,338	12.05%	2,251,699	0.68%	19,618,719	5.92%	622,018	0.19%	1,689,833	0.51%	13,548,983	4.09%	62,080,044	18.73%
United States (50 states, DC, and Puerto Rico)		334,735,155	191,722,195	57.28%	39,944,624	11.93%	2,252,011	0.67%	19,621,465	5.86%	622,109	0.19%	1,692,341	0.51%	13,551,323	4.05%	65,329,087	19.52%
Texas		29,145,505	11,584,597	39.75%	3,444,712	11.82%	85,425	0.29%	1,561,518	5.36%	27,857	0.10%	113,584	0.39%	886,095	3.04%	11,441,717	39.26%

== Defunct counties ==
There have been at least thirty-two counties established by Texas law that no longer exist. These fall into five categories: judicial counties; counties established by the Constitutional Convention of 1868–69; counties never organized which were abolished by legislative act; counties whose territory is no longer considered part of the state; and counties whose names have been changed.

- Buchel County, formed in 1887 from Presidio County. Annexed in 1897 to Brewster County.
- Dawson County, formed in 1858 in what is now Kinney County and Uvalde County and abolished in 1866 (not to be confused with the present-day Dawson County).
- Encinal County, formed in 1856. Abolished in 1899 and annexed to Webb County.
- Foley County, formed in 1887 from Presidio County. Annexed in 1897 to Brewster County.
- Greer County, formed in 1860. Separated from Texas by U.S. Supreme Court ruling in United States v. the State of Texas, 162 U.S. 1 (1896) and is now part of southwestern Oklahoma.
- Perdido County, formed in 1824 and forgotten during the upheavals of the 1840s. Perdido was reportedly abolished in 1858 and again in 1871. Records of annexation to Dawson County are also inconclusive.
- Santa Fe County, Texas formed in 1848 from lands claimed by the Republic of Texas and ceded by Mexico. It included a vast area later becoming portions of several states from New Mexico east of the Rio Grande extending northward into south-central Wyoming. Within Texas' modern boundaries, the county included the Trans-Pecos and most of the Panhandle. The county was abolished when Texas ceded its western lands under the Compromise of 1850.
- Wegefarth County, formed in 1873 in the Texas Panhandle and abolished in 1876.
- Worth County, formed in 1850 from part of Santa Fe County. Abolished under the Compromise of 1850 and is now part of east-central New Mexico.

== See also ==
- Texas census statistical areas
- List of Texas county seat name etymologies
- List of counties in Georgia

== Sources ==
- "Find a County". National Association of Counties. Archived from the original on March 13, 2007. - Counties, county seats, county formation, and areas
- "CountyState.info Texas", Official County Websites - official sites
- "Texas County Progress". Official Publication of the County Judges and Commissioners Association. - official sites
- "Updated List of Texas Cities and Counties By Population in 2019". - Google Doc
