= Perdido County, Texas =

Perdido County (from the Spanish word for "lost") was the name of a now defunct county in Texas. Created in the 1820s, prior to the Texas Revolution, the county was all but forgotten in the post-revolution land grants and general confusion of the following decades. It was thought to be abolished in 1858, but was not officially declared defunct until 1871.
