= Worth County, Texas =

Coordinates: 33°40′N 105°50′W

Worth County
- Former U.S. county in Texas
- Proposals for Texas northwestern boundary being considered in Compromise of 1850.
- Interactive map of Worth County
- Founded: January 3, 1850
- Abolished: November 25, 1850
- Named for: William Jenkins Worth
- Seat: Valverde

Worth County was a Texas county which was established by the state legislature from territory previously belonging to Santa Fe County, Texas on January 3, 1850. Val Verde (later the site of the Civil War Battle of Valverde) was established as the county seat.

Worth County was never actually organized as the territory (in large part due to local opposition of the area being considered a part of Texas) and was ceded a few months later to the US Federal government on November 25, 1850, as a part of the Compromise of 1850.

== See also ==
- List of defunct counties in Texas
