= U.S. Route 67 in Texas =

U.S. Numbered Highway in Texas, United States

U.S. Highway 67
- US 67 highlighted in red

Route information
- Maintained by TxDOT
- Length: 766 mi (Note: Length does not account for concurrencies along Interstate Highways and U.S. Highways with lower numbers) (1,233 km)
- Existed: 1927–present

Major junctions
- South end: Fed. 16 / Chih. 67 at the Mexican border in Presidio
- I-10 near Fort Stockton; I-35W in Alvarado; I-20 in Dallas; I-35E / US 77 in Dallas; I-30 / I-35E / US 77 in Dallas; I-45 / I-345 in Dallas; I-635 in Mesquite; I-30 near Sulphur Springs; I-30 in Mount Pleasant
- North end: US 67 / US 71 / US 82 at the Arkansas state line in Texarkana

Location
- Country: United States
- State: Texas
- Counties: Presidio, Brewster, Pecos, Crockett, Crane, Upton, Reagan, Irion, Tom Green, Runnels, Coleman, Brown, Comanche, Erath, Somervell, Johnson, Ellis, Dallas, Rockwall, Hunt, Hopkins, Franklin, Titus, Morris, Cass, Bowie

Highway system
- United States Numbered Highway System; List; Special; Divided; Highways in Texas; Interstate; US; State; Former; Toll; Loops; Spurs; FM/RM; Park; Rec
← SH 66	→ SH 67

U.S. Route 67 (US 67) is a major U.S. highway in the state of Texas. It runs from the Mexican border west of Presidio to Texarkana at the Arkansas state line. US 67 is part of the La Entrada al Pacifico international trade corridor from its southern terminus to US 385 in McCamey.

== Route description ==
US 67 enters Texas from Mexico as Federal Highway 16 west of Presidio. US 67 travels miles between Chinati Mountains State Natural Area and Big Bend Ranch State Park. US 67 shares an overlap with US 90 from Marfa to Alpine. Leaving US 90, US 67 travels north towards I-10. US 67 shares an overlap with I-10 for almost 25 miles. In Fort Stockton, US 385 joins this overlap. US 67/385 leave I-10 just east of Fort Stockton.

US 67 leaves I-10 with US 385 and the two share an overlap until McCamey. US 67 travels in a mostly east–west direction towards San Angelo. US 67 travels through mostly rural areas, passing through or near the towns of Rankin, Big Lake, and Mertzon. In San Angelo, parts of US 67 are known as the Houston Harte Expressway, named after the San Angelo-native publishing magnate. US 67 starts a short overlap with US 277 in San Angelo along the Houston Harte.

US 67 ends its overlap with US 277 northeast of San Angelo. US 67 travels towards Ballinger and has an overlap with US 83. Between the towns of Santa Anna and Stephenville, US 67 shares overlaps with US highways 84, 183, and 377. The overlap with US 377 starts in Brownwood and ends in south east Stephenville.

US 67 leaves Stephenville and travels to Glen Rose, the location of Dinosaur Valley State Park. US 67 then travels to Cleburne, bypassing the town on a four lane freeway; the bypass is known as Walter P. Holliday Drive from US 67 Business near Lake Pat Cleburne to FM 4, while the remainder is known as Catherine P. Raines Drive. US 67 travels through the towns of Keene, Alvarado, and Venus before entering Midlothian, where a freeway begins that travels all the way to I-35E in Dallas. US 67 shares an unsigned overlap with I-35E/US 77 to Downtown Dallas, where US 67 leaves I-35E and joins I-30.

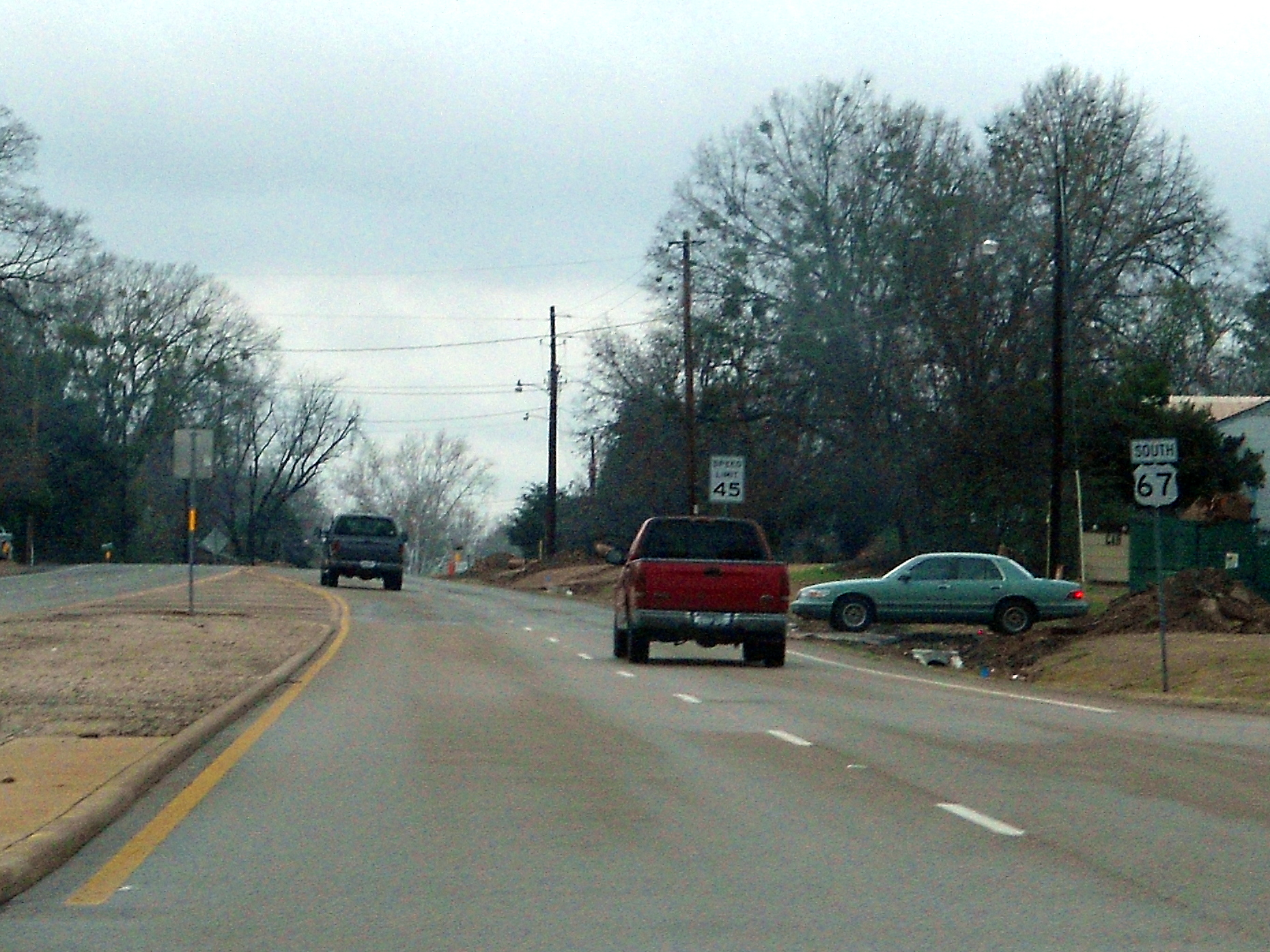
US 67 in Omaha

US 67 shares an unsigned overlap with I-30 that starts in Downtown Dallas. The two highways travel through east Dallas, Mesquite, and Garland, Texas before crossing over Lake Ray Hubbard, twice. After the second crossing, the highways enter Rockwall. In Royse City, US 67 signage begins. The highways then arrive in Greenville.

US 67 travels through Sulphur Springs, before leaving I-30 east of town. US 67 then parallels I-30, occasionally crossing the highway. US 67 passes through the towns of Mount Vernon, and Mount Pleasant. East of Mount Pleasant, US 67 travels miles south of I-30 traveling through Morris County. US 67 travels on the south border of the Lone Star Army Ammunition Plant, before arriving in Texarkana. US 67 travels to downtown where it enters Arkansas at State Line Avenue (US 71/US 82).

== Major intersections ==
County	Location	mi	km	Destinations	Notes
Rio Grande		0.0	0.0	Presidio-Ojinaga International Bridge; Continues as Fed. 16 west – Chihuahua City	
Presidio	Presidio	0.6	0.97	Bus. US 67 north (O'Reilly Street) – US 67, Redford	Former routing of US 67
Presidio	Presidio	1.5	2.4	Bus. US 67 south / FM 170 east – Redford, Lajitas, Terlingua	south end of FM 170 overlap
Presidio		1.9	3.1	Erma Avenue south	Former Spur 310 and former routing of US 67
Presidio		2.0	3.2	FM 170 west – Ruidosa	north end of FM 170 overlap
Presidio		52.9	85.1	RM 169 south	
Presidio	Marfa	60.4	97.2	US 90 west / SH 17 north – Fort Davis, Valentine, Fort Davis National Historic Site, McDonald Observatory and Visitor Center	south end of US 90 overlap
Brewster		85.0	136.8	FM 1703 north	
Brewster	Alpine	86.5	139.2	SH 118 north (5th Street) – Fort Davis, Fort Davis National Historic Site, McDonald Observatory and Visitor Center	south end of SH 118 overlap
Brewster	Alpine	86.9	139.9	SH 118 south (Cockrell Street) – Big Bend National Park Headquarters	north end of SH 118 overlap
Brewster	Alpine	87.1	140.2	SH 223 north (North Harrison Street) – Fort Davis	
Brewster		94.8	152.6	US 90 east – Marathon	north end of US 90 overlap
Pecos		142.6	229.5	I-10 west / FM 1776 north – Coyanosa, El Paso, Van Horn	south end of I-10 overlap; US 67 south follows exit 248
Pecos	see I-10				
Pecos		166.8	268.4	I-10 east – Ozona, San Antonio	north end of I-10 overlap; US 67 north follows exit 273
Pecos	Girvin	187.8	302.2	FM 11 – Imperial, Grandfalls, Bakersfield	
Crockett	No major junctions				
Crane	No major junctions				
Upton	McCamey	199.0	320.3	US 385 north / FM 305 south – Crane, Odessa	North end of US 385 overlap
Upton		203.9	328.1	RM 2463 north to SH 329	
Upton		213.5	343.6	SH 349 south – Iraan, Sheffield	South end of SH 349 overlap
Upton	Rankin	217.1	349.4	SH 329 west – Crane, Grandfalls	
Upton	Rankin	217.6	350.2	SH 349 north – Midland, Lamesa	North end of SH 349 overlap
Upton	Rankin	218.0	350.8	Spur 576 north – Midland	
Reagan		231.9	373.2	RM 1555 north to SH 349	
Reagan		232.6	374.3	RM 1675 east – Texon	
Reagan		234.6	377.6	RM 1675 west	
Reagan		242.0	389.5	RM 1676 south	
Reagan	Big Lake	246.1	396.1	SH 137 – Stanton, Lamesa, Ozona	
Irion	Barnhart	264.4	425.5	SH 163 – Sterling City, Colorado City, Ozona	
Irion		286.3	460.8	RM 915 south – Eldorado	
Irion	Mertzon	289.3	465.6	RM 2469 west to SH 163	
Irion		290.6	467.7	FM 72 east – Sherwood	
Irion		292.7	471.1	RM 853 east – Arden, San Angelo	
Tom Green	Tankersley	302.4	486.7	FM 2335 south – Boy's Ranch, Knickerbocker, Christoval	
Tom Green	San Angelo	311.6	501.5	FM 2288 north to US 87 – Grape Creek, San Angelo State Park	
Tom Green	San Angelo	311.9	502.0	Bus. US 67 north / Loop 306 – Sonora, Eden	interchange; south end of freeway
Tom Green	San Angelo	312.5	502.9	RM 853 (Arden Road) / Glenna Street – Mertzon	
Tom Green	San Angelo	313.5	504.5	Garfield Street / Glenna Street	no direct southbound exit (signed at Van Buren Street)
Tom Green	San Angelo	314.8	506.6	Howard Street / Van Buren Street / Jefferson Street	
Tom Green	San Angelo	315.7	508.1	US 87 / US 277 south (US 67 Bus. south) / Martin Luther King Drive – Big Spring, Sonora, Eden	South end of US 277 overlap
Tom Green	San Angelo	316.6	509.5	Chadbourne Street / Oakes Street / Martin Luther King Drive - Downtown San Angelo, Historic San Angelo	Access to Shannon Medical Center
Tom Green	San Angelo	317.2	510.5	Bus. US 67 north (Main Street)	
Tom Green	San Angelo	318.4	512.4	Bell Street – Goodfellow AFB	
Tom Green	San Angelo	319.2	513.7	FM 380 (Pulliam Street / US 67 Bus. south) – Paint Rock	
Tom Green	San Angelo	320.1	515.2	Loop 306	interchange; north end of freeway
Tom Green		321.6	517.6	US 277 north – Bronte, Abilene	interchange; north end of US 277 overlap
Tom Green		327.9	527.7	FM 1692 north – Miles	
Runnels	Miles	335.2	539.5	FM 1692 north	south end of FM 1692 overlap
Runnels	Miles	335.4	539.8	FM 1692 south – Mereta	north end of FM 1692 overlap
Runnels	Rowena	343.2	552.3	FM 381 south – Lowake	
Runnels	Rowena	343.7	553.1	FM 2133 east to US 83	South end of FM 2133 overlap
Runnels	Rowena	343.8	553.3	FM 2872 west – Miles	
Runnels	Rowena	344.2	553.9	FM 2133 north – Wingate	North end of FM 2133 overlap
Runnels		348.5	560.9	FM 1678 south to FM 1929	
Runnels	Ballinger	351.2	565.2	FM 2133 south	
Runnels	Ballinger	352.6	567.5	US 83 south (South 7th Street) – Eden, Paint Rock	South end of US 83 overlap
Runnels	Ballinger	352.7	567.6	SH 158 west – Bronte, Robert Lee	
Runnels	Ballinger	353.6	569.1	US 83 north – Winters, Abilene	Interchange; north end of US 83 overlap
Coleman	Talpa	368.1	592.4	FM 2132 north	
Coleman		370.6	596.4	FM 2805 north – Glen Cove	
Coleman	Valera	377.6	607.7	FM 503 – Voss, Hords Creek Lake, Ivie Reservoir	
Coleman		382.2	615.1	SH 206 north – Coleman	
Coleman		382.9	616.2	FM 1026 – Coleman, Gouldbusk	
Coleman		385.0	619.6	FM 2131 – Coleman, Shields	
Coleman	Santa Anna	390.4	628.3	US 84 west / US 283 north – Coleman, Abilene	South end of US 84 / US 283 overlap
Coleman	Santa Anna	390.7	628.8	US 283 south – Brady	North end of US 283 overlap
Coleman	Santa Anna	391.2	629.6	FM 1176 south – Trickham	South end of FM 1176 overlap
Coleman	Santa Anna	391.5	630.1	FM 1176 north – Cross Plains	North end of FM 1176 overlap
Coleman		395.7	636.8	FM 567 south – Trickham	
Brown	Bangs	400.9	645.2	FM 585 north – Echo	
Brown	Bangs	402.6	647.9	FM 586 south – Brookesmith	
Brown		404.5	651.0	FM 1849 north to SH 279 – Cross Plains	
Brown	Brownwood	410.1	660.0	FM 3254 south	
Brown	Brownwood	411.1	661.6	SH 279 north (Lakeway Drive) – Cross Plains	
Brown	Brownwood	411.3	661.9	FM 2524 east – Camp Bowie Military Reservation	
Brown	Brownwood	411.8	662.7	US 377 south – Brady	South end of US 377 overlap
Brown	Early	412.7	664.2	FM 2525 east	
Brown	Early	412.9	664.5	US 183 north – Rising Star, Cisco, Airport	South end of US 183 overlap
Brown	Early	414.1	666.4	US 84 east / US 183 south – Goldthwaite, Waco, Lampasas, Austin	North end of US 84 / US 183 overlap
Brown	Early	416.8	670.8	FM 3100 north	
Brown	Blanket	424.0	682.4	FM 1467 east – Zephyr	South end of FM 1467 overlap
Brown	Blanket	424.9	683.8	FM 1467 west	North end of FM 1467 overlap
Comanche	Comanche	436.9	703.1	SH 36 west – Rising Star, Abilene	South end of SH 36 overlap
Comanche	Comanche	437.6	704.2	SH 16 – Goldthwaite, De Leon	
Comanche	Comanche	438.7	706.0	SH 36 east – Hamilton, Temple	North end of SH 36 overlap
Comanche		440.2	708.4	FM 3381	
Comanche	Hasse	446.4	718.4	FM 2861 west	
Comanche	Proctor	449.7	723.7	FM 1476 north – De Leon	South end of FM 1476 overlap
Comanche	Proctor	449.9	724.0	FM 1476 south – Gustine, Newburg	North end of FM 1476 overlap
Erath	Dublin	456.3	734.3	Bus. US 67 north – Dublin	
Erath	Dublin	458.4	737.7	SH 6 – De Leon, Hico	Interchange
Erath	Dublin	459.9	740.1	FM 219 – Lingleville, Huckabay, Dublin, Clifton	
Erath	Dublin	461.3	742.4	Bus. US 67 south – Dublin	
Erath	Stephenville	469.3	755.3	FM 988 north to FM 8	
Erath	Stephenville	470.2	756.7	Bus. US 377 north – Stephenville Business District, Tarleton State University	
Erath	Stephenville	471.8	759.3	FM 914 south – Alexander, Carlton	
Erath	Stephenville	472.4	760.3	SH 108 (South Graham) – Huckabay, Thurber	
Erath	Stephenville	472.7	760.7	US 377 north – Granbury, Fort Worth	North end of US 377 overlap
Erath	Stephenville	473.1	761.4	US 281 – Mineral Wells, Hico, Airport	
Erath		480.0	772.5	FM 913 west – Selden	
Erath	Johnsville	482.9	777.2	FM 2481 – Duffau, Bluff Dale	
Erath	Chalk Mountain	489.6	787.9	SH 220 south – Hico	
Somervell		492.8	793.1	FM 51 north – Paluxy, Granbury	
Somervell	Glass	495.7	797.8	FM 203 south – Walnut Springs	
Somervell	Glen Rose	500.8	806.0	PR 59 north / FM 205 – Dinosaur Valley State Park, Glen Rose Historical Downtown District	
Somervell	Glen Rose	501.7	807.4	FM 56 – Tolar	
Somervell	Glen Rose	502.8	809.2	SH 144 south (Barnard Street) – Walnut Springs	South end of SH 144 overlap
Somervell		503.8	810.8	SH 144 north – Granbury	North end of SH 144 overlap
Somervell	Rainbow	505.4	813.4	FM 200 – Nemo, Cleburne State Park	
Somervell		508.6	818.5	FM 199 south – Nemo	south end of FM 199 overlap
Somervell		508.8	818.8	FM 199 north	north end of FM 199 overlap
Johnson		518.2	834.0	FM 2331 north – Godley	
Johnson		519.4	835.9	PR 21 south – Cleburne State Park	
Johnson	Cleburne	520.6	837.8	FM 1434 south – Cleburne State Park	
Johnson	Cleburne	521.6	839.4	Bus. US 67 north – Cleburne	interchange; south end of freeway, access to Texas Health Harris Methodist Cleburne
Johnson	Cleburne	522.8	841.4	County Road 1121 / Woodard Avenue	
Johnson	Cleburne	524.2	843.6	FM 4 (West Kilpatrick Street) – Airport	
Johnson	Cleburne	525.8	846.2	Chisholm Trail Parkway / SH 171 / County Road 1216 / Nolan River Road	
Johnson	Cleburne	527.4	848.8	SH 174 – Burleson, Cleburne	
Johnson	Cleburne	528.7	850.9	County Road 801	
Johnson	Keene	530.8	854.2	FM 2280 – Keene	Northbound exit and southbound entrance
Johnson	Keene	531.4	855.2	Bus. US 67 south – Cleburne	Interchange; north end of freeway; southbound exit and northbound entrance
Johnson	Keene	531.8	855.8	Spur 102 north (South College Drive) – Keene, Southwestern Adventist University	
Johnson	Alvarado	537.9	865.7	I-35W – Fort Worth, Waco	I-35W exit 26A
Johnson	Alvarado	538.2	866.1	I-35 BL / Bus. US 67 north – Alvarado Business District	
Johnson	Alvarado	539.2	867.8	Bus. US 67 south – Alvarado Business District	
Johnson		542.6	873.2	FM 2738 north – Lillian	
Johnson	Venus	545.5	877.9	FM 157 – Mansfield, Maypearl	
Ellis	Midlothian	548.1	882.1	Miller Road / Railport Parkway	interchange
Ellis	Midlothian	549.8	884.8	Ward Road	interchange; south end of freeway
Ellis	Midlothian	550.9	886.6	US 287 / Spur 73 (US 287 Bus.) – Fort Worth, Waxahachie, Ennis	former US 67 Bus. north
Ellis	Midlothian	553.2	890.3	Ninth Street	former US 67 Bus. south
Ellis	Midlothian	554.3	892.1	Dove Lane / Midlothian Parkway	
Ellis	Midlothian	555.8	894.5	Shiloh Road	
Ellis		557.3	896.9	Lake Ridge Parkway	southbound exit only
Dallas	Cedar Hill	558.1	898.2	Mount Lebanon Road	
Dallas	Cedar Hill	559.2	899.9	Frontage Road	Southbound exit only
Dallas	Cedar Hill	559.5	900.4	Tidwell Street	
Dallas	Cedar Hill	560.2	901.6	Cooper Street	
Dallas	Cedar Hill	560.8	902.5	Belt Line Road	no direct northbound exit (signed at Cooper Street)
Dallas	Cedar Hill	561.3	903.3	FM 1382 – Grand Prairie, DeSoto	
Dallas	Cedar Hill	561.8	904.1	Pleasant Run Road / Joe Wilson Road	
Dallas	Cedar Hill–Duncanville line	563.2	906.4	Wintergreen Road	
Dallas	Duncanville	564.1	907.8	South Main Street	no direct northbound exit (signed at Wintergreen Road)
Dallas	Duncanville	564.6	908.6	Danieldale Road	
Dallas	Duncanville	565.3	909.8	Cockrell Hill Road	
Dallas	Duncanville–Dallas line	566.0	910.9	Wheatland Road	Access to Charlton Methodist Hospital
Dallas	Duncanville–Dallas line	566.4– 566.6	911.5– 911.9	I-20 – Fort Worth, Shreveport, Tyler	I-20 exits 464A-B
Dallas	Dallas	567.5	913.3	Camp Wisdom Road	no direct northbound exit (signed at Wheatland Road)
Dallas	Dallas	568.0	914.1	Red Bird Lane	
Dallas	Dallas	568.7	915.2	Hampton Road - Dallas Executive Airport	no direct northbound exit (signed at Red Bird Lane)
Dallas	Dallas	569.6– 570.0	916.7– 917.3	Loop 12 / Pentagon Parkway	
Dallas	Dallas	570.4	918.0	Polk Street / Pentagon Parkway	
Dallas	Dallas	571.0	918.9	Kiest Boulevard	
Dallas	Dallas	571.4	919.6	I-35E south (US 77) – Waco	southbound exit and northbound entrance; south end of I-35E / US 77 overlap; US 67 south follows exit 423A
Dallas	Dallas	see I-35E			
Dallas	Dallas	575.9	926.8	To I-30 west / Riverfront Boulevard / Cadiz Street	I-35E exit 427C; no direct northbound entrance
Dallas	Dallas	575.4	926.0	I-35E north (US 77) to US 75 – Denton, McKinney	north end of I-35E / US 77 overlap; US 67 north follows exit 428A
Dallas	Dallas	575.5	926.2	I-30 west – Fort Worth	southbound exit and northbound entrance; south end of I-30 overlap; US 67 south follows exit 44B
Dallas	Dallas	576.2	927.3	Griffin Street - Downtown Dallas	northbound exit and southbound entrance; I-30 exit 45B
Dallas	Dallas	577.1	928.8	Ervay Street	southbound exit and northbound entrance; I-30 exit 45
see I-30
Hopkins		665.9	1,071.7	I-30 east – Mount Vernon, Texarkana	North end of I-30 overlap; US 67 north follows exit 135
Hopkins	Weaver	667.7	1,074.6	FM 269 south to I-30 – Pickton	
Hopkins	Saltillo	672.3	1,082.0	FM 900 south – Purley	South end of FM 900 overlap
Hopkins	Saltillo	672.6	1,082.4	FM 900 north – Sulphur Bluff	North end of FM 900 overlap
Franklin	Mount Vernon	678.1	1,091.3	SH 37 south to I-30 – Winnsboro, Mineola	South end of SH 37 overlap
Franklin	Mount Vernon	678.4	1,091.8	SH 37 north – Clarksville, Bogata	North end of SH 37 overlap; south end of Bus. SH 37 overlap
Franklin	Mount Vernon	679.0	1,092.7	Bus. SH 37 north	North end of Bus. SH 37 overlap
Franklin	Mount Vernon	679.1	1,092.9	Spur 423 south to I-30	
Franklin		682.3	1,098.1	FM 1896 north	
Titus	Winfield	685.5	1,103.2	Spur 185 south to I-30	
Titus		686.0	1,104.0	FM 1734 east – Mount Pleasant	
Titus	Mount Pleasant	692.2	1,114.0	Spur 134	
Titus	Mount Pleasant	692.4	1,114.3	US 271 (Ferguson Road) to I-30 / SH 49 – Paris, Pittsburg, Daingerfield	
Titus	Mount Pleasant	693.6	1,116.2	FM 1734 west (North Edwards Avenue) – Winfield	
Titus	Mount Pleasant	694.1	1,117.0	Bus. US 271 (North Jefferson Avenue) to I-30 – Talco, Pittsburg	
Titus	Mount Pleasant	694.5	1,117.7	FM 1402 – Sugar Hill	Interchange
Titus		696.6	1,121.1	FM 1001 north – Argo	
Titus	Cookville	700.6	1,127.5	FM 1993 north	
Titus	Cookville	701.0	1,128.2	FM 1000 south	
Morris	Omaha	707.3	1,138.3	FM 144 north	South end of FM 144 overlap
Morris	Omaha	707.6	1,138.8	FM 144 south – Cason	North end of FM 144 overlap
Morris	Omaha	708.2	1,139.7	US 259 – De Kalb, Daingerfield, Longview	
Morris	Naples	711.7	1,145.4	FM 161 south – Hughes Springs	
Morris	Naples	712.4	1,146.5	SH 77 to SH 338 – Atlanta, Douglassville, Daingerfield	interchange
Cass	No major junctions				
Bowie	Bassett	722.5	1,162.8	FM 990 north – De Kalb	
Bowie	Simms	726.6	1,169.3	SH 98 north – New Boston, TDCJ Barry Telford Unit	
Bowie	Corley	734.0	1,181.3	SH 8 north – New Boston	South end of SH 8 overlap
Bowie	Maud	736.9	1,185.9	SH 8 south – Linden, Douglassville	North end of SH 8 overlap
Bowie		739.5	1,190.1	FM 2149 west – Old Boston	
Bowie	Redwater	742.3	1,194.6	FM 3098	
Bowie	Redwater	742.8	1,195.4	FM 991 west	south end of FM 991 overlap
Bowie	Redwater	742.9	1,195.6	FM 991 east	north end of FM 991 overlap
Bowie		748.5	1,204.6	FM 991 west	
Bowie		748.7	1,204.9	FM 2148 – Leary, Atlanta	
Bowie	Wake Village	751.1	1,208.8	FM 989 (Kings Highway) to US 59 south / US 82 – Nash	
Bowie	Texarkana–Wake Village line	752.5	1,211.0	I-369 / US 59 (East Loop Drive / South Bishop Road) to I-30 – Marshall, Dallas, Little Rock	I-369 exit 112
Bowie	Texarkana	754.7	1,214.6	SH 93 (Summerhill Road / Lake Drive) to I-30 / US 59 – Atlanta	
Bowie	Texarkana	755.4	1,215.7	US 82 west (Texas Boulevard) to Loop 14	South end of US 82 overlap
Bowie	Texarkana	755.7	1,216.2	US 71 north (State Line Avenue) US 67 north / US 71 south / US 82 east (Seventh Street) – El Dorado, Little Rock, Shreveport	Arkansas state line; north end of US 71 overlap
1.000 mi = 1.609 km; 1.000 km = 0.621 mi: Concurrency terminus; Incomplete access

== Special routes ==
US 67 has business routes in Presidio, two in San Angelo, Cleburne, Alvarado, and Sulphur Springs. An additional business route has been proposed for Dublin, and Midlothian and Greenville formerly had business routes. These routes largely follow former alignments through these cities before US 67 bypasses were constructed.

== See also ==
- List of U.S. Highways in Texas
- Texas State Highway 66
- Texas State Highway 78

== Notes ==
U.S. Route 67
Previous state: Terminus	Texas	Next state: Arkansas
