= Texas State Highway 153 =

State highway in Texas

State Highway 153
- SH 153 highlighted in red

Route information
- Maintained by TxDOT
- Length: 70.89 mi (114.09 km)
- Existed: 1988–present

Major junctions
- South end: US 84 / US 283 in Coleman
- US 83 in Winters; US 277 near Wingate
- North end: SH 70 south of Sweetwater

Location
- Country: United States
- State: Texas
- Counties: Coleman, Runnels, Taylor, Nolan

Highway system
- Highways in Texas; Interstate; US; State; Former; Toll; Loops; Spurs; FM/RM; Park; Rec
| ← SH 152 | → SH 154 |

State Highway 153 (SH 153) is a highway in the U.S. State of Texas that runs from Coleman northwest to a junction south of Sweetwater.

== History ==
SH 153 was originally designated on March 19, 1930 along a route from Valley Mills to Temple as a renumbering of SH 36A. This route was rerouted so that its south end was at Belton later. This route was cancelled on June 15, 1935. The road was restored on October 22, 1935, but as a lateral road, which the section south of McGregor became SH 317 on May 23, 1939, and the remainder became FM 56 on May 19, 1942 (this section became part of SH 317 in 1947). The current route was designated on May 16, 1988, replacing FM 53.

The section of SH 153 between Winters and SH 70 has seen an increase in traffic due to Google Maps recommending drivers traveling from the South Plains (Lubbock) or Panhandle (Amarillo) regions to cities such as Austin or San Antonio use the highway. Additionally, the highway is only two lanes, features many s-curves, is narrow in many places with no shoulders, and many sections have no passing zones. A fatal head-on collision occurred on the highway between Winters and Wingate on June 14, 2021 that left three people dead. Due to the increase of both traffic and wrecks on SH 153, the Texas Department of Transportation (TxDOT) announced that the speed limit would be reduced from 75 MPH to 65 in Taylor and Nolan counties on June 19, 2021.

== Major intersections ==
| County | Location | mi | km | Destinations | Notes |
|---|---|---|---|---|---|
| Coleman | Coleman | 0.0 | 0.0 | US 84 / US 283 | Southern terminus |
| Coleman | Coleman | 0.9 | 1.4 | SH 206 south (Commercial Avenue) | South end of SH 206 overlap |
| Coleman | Coleman | 1.2 | 1.9 | SH 206 north (Neches Street) | North end of SH 206 overlap |
| Coleman | | 8.0 | 12.9 | FM 503 – Valera, Voss | |
| Coleman | Glen Cove | 14.2 | 22.9 | FM 2805 south / County Road 448 | |
| Runnels | | 19.6 | 31.5 | FM 2132 south – Talpa | |
| Runnels | | 24.2 | 38.9 | FM 382 – Lawn, Ballinger | |
| Runnels | | 31.0 | 49.9 | FM 2647 – Ballinger | |
| Runnels | | 34.4 | 55.4 | Loop 438 west | |
| Runnels | Winters | 35.5 | 57.1 | US 83 – Ballinger, Abilene | |
| Runnels | | 38.0 | 61.2 | Loop 438 east | |
| Runnels | | 39.1 | 62.9 | FM 1677 north – Pumphrey | |
| Runnels | | 41.3 | 66.5 | FM 384 west / FM 2111 south – Bronte, Ballinger | |
| Runnels | Wingate | 47.4 | 76.3 | FM 383 south – Wilmeth | |
| Runnels | | 48.8 | 78.5 | FM 2595 east – Drasco | |
| Taylor | | 51.8 | 83.4 | US 277 – Abilene, San Angelo | Interchange |
| Nolan | | 55.7 | 89.6 | FM 1170 west – Hylton, Blackwell | |
| Nolan | | 66.4 | 106.9 | FM 126 east – Nolan, Merkel | |
| Nolan | | 70.9 | 114.1 | SH 70 – San Angelo, Sweetwater | Northern terminus |
1.000 mi = 1.609 km; 1.000 km = 0.621 mi
