= Echo, Coleman County, Texas =

- Unincorporated community
- Location within Texas Location within the United States
- Coordinates: 31°55′41″N 99°19′04″W
- Country: United States
- State: Texas
- County: Coleman
- Elevation: 1,568 ft (478 m)
- Time zone: UTC-6 (Central (CST))
  - Summer (DST): UTC-5 (CDT)
- Area code: 325
- GNIS feature ID: 1380845

Echo is an unincorporated community in Coleman County, Texas, United States. According to the Handbook of Texas, the community had a population of 16 in 2000.

== History ==
The area in what is known as Echo today developed around a store established there in the 1870s. William Dibrell bought a land grant from the Miles and Gholson Ranch in 1881 for the community and named it Echo for the echo that people would hear from a cliff on Home Creek. A post office was established at Echo in 1910 and served 75 residents in 1940. It went down to 16 from 1970 through 2000.

== Geography ==
Echo is located on Texas State Highway 206, 4 mi (6.4 km) northeast of Coleman and 24 mi (39 km) southwest of Cross Plains in central Coleman County.

== Education ==
Echo had its own school in 1940. Today, Echo is served by the Coleman Independent School District.
