= Texas State Highway 206 =

State highway in Texas

State Highway 206
- SH 206, highlighted in red

Route information
- Maintained by TxDOT
- Length: 55.891 mi (Note: The certified mileage given is shorter than the actual mileage as TxDOT considers SH 206 to be discontinuous at rather than concurrent with US 84, US 283, and SH 153.) (89.948 km)
- Existed: by 1935–present

Major junctions
- South end: US 67 southeast of Coleman
- US 84 / US 283 in Coleman; I-20 in Cisco
- North end: US 183 / SH 6 in Cisco

Location
- Country: United States
- State: Texas

Highway system
- Highways in Texas; Interstate; US; State; Former; Toll; Loops; Spurs; FM/RM; Park; Rec
← SH 205	→ SH 207

State Highway 206 (SH 206) is a Texas state highway running from US 67 near Coleman northeast to Cisco.

== History ==
SH 206 was originally designated on July 23, 1934, replacing a section of SH 23 between Coleman and Rising Star. By 1939, the section between Cross Plains and Rising Star was transferred to SH 36. On October 24, 1955, SH 206 was extended over old US 67 to new US 67. On March 22, 1960, SH 206 was extended northeast from Cross Plains to FM 569. On June 26, 1962, SH 206 was extended from FM 569 to another point on FM 569 2 miles south of US 80. On June 27, 1963, SH 206 was extended to US 80. The route was extended into Cisco on August 28, 1991, replacing US 80 when it was decommissioned west of Dallas.

== Route description ==
SH 206 begins at a junction with US 67. It heads north from this junction to an intersection with FM 1026. The highway continues to the north to an intersection with FM 568 in Coleman. Heading towards the north through Coleman, the highway continues to a junction with SH 153. It runs concurrently with SH 153 briefly before it continues to the north to an intersection with US 84 and US 283. It continues to the north concurrent with both US 84 and US 283 until US 84 splits off to the northwest and US 283 and SH 206 continue concurrently briefly until they also split with US 283 heading north and SH 206 continuing to the northeast. It heads northeast from this junction through Coleman to an intersection with FM 3425. The highway leaves Coleman as it continues to the northeast to an intersection with FM 2302. Heading towards the northeast, the highway continues to a junction with FM 1176. The highway continues to the northeast to an intersection with FM 585. It continues to the northeast to a junction with FM 2806. As the highway continues to the northeast, it intersects FM 2707. It heads northeast from this junction to an intersection with SH 279. The highway continues to the northeast to an intersection with SH 36 in Cross Plains. Heading towards the northeast through Cross Plains, the highway continues to a junction with FM 374. The highway continues to the northeast through Cross Plains to an intersection with FM 880. It continues to the northeast to a junction with FM 569. As the highway continues to the northeast, it intersects FM 2526. It heads northeast from this junction to an intersection with FM 1864. The highway continues to the northeast to an intersection with FM 569. Heading towards the northeast, the highway continues to a junction with I-20 in Cisco. The highway continues to the northeast through Cisco to an intersection with FM 2945. SH 206 reaches its northern terminus at US 183 and SH 6 in Cisco.

== Junction list ==
County	Location	mi	km	Destinations	Notes
Coleman		0.0	0.0	US 67 – Ballinger, Brownwood	
Coleman		1.0	1.6	FM 1026 south – Fisk, Mozelle, Gouldbusk	
Coleman	Coleman	5.0	8.0	FM 568 east (Santa Anna Avenue)	
Coleman	Coleman	6.1	9.8	SH 153 east (Walnut Street) / Commercial Avenue	South end of SH 153 overlap
Coleman	Coleman	6.3	10.1	SH 153 west (Walnut Street) / Neches Street	North end of SH 153 overlap
Coleman	Coleman	7.5	12.1	US 84 east / US 283 south – Santa Anna, Brownwood	South end of US 84 / US 283 overlap
Coleman	Coleman	8.2	13.2	US 84 west – Abilene	North end of US 84 overlap
Coleman	Coleman	8.4	13.5	US 283 north – Baird	North end of US 283 overlap
Coleman	Coleman	9.4	15.1	FM 3425 south – Airport	
Coleman		12.9	20.8	FM 2302 east	
Coleman		15.4	24.8	FM 1176 south – Santa Anna	
Coleman		18.2	29.3	FM 585 south – Brownwood	
Coleman		21.2	34.1	FM 2806 north	
Coleman		29.0	46.7	FM 2707 north	
Brown	No major junctions				
Callahan		33.0	53.1	SH 279 south – Brownwood	
Callahan	Cross Plains	34.0	54.7	SH 36 – Abilene, Rising Star	
Callahan	Cross Plains	34.3	55.2	FM 374 east (Northeast 1st Street)	
Callahan	Cross Plains	34.8	56.0	FM 880 north (West Cypress Street) – Putnam	
Eastland		41.3	66.5	FM 569	
Eastland		48.1	77.4	FM 2526	
Eastland		51.1	82.2	FM 1864 west	
Eastland		53.1	85.5	FM 569 south	
Eastland	Cisco	55.2	88.8	I-20 – Abilene, Eastland	I-20 exit 330
Eastland	Cisco	56.0	90.1	FM 2945 west	
Eastland	Cisco	57.0	91.7	US 183 / SH 6	
1.000 mi = 1.609 km; 1.000 km = 0.621 mi: Concurrency terminus
