= Whon, Texas =

- Unincorporated community
- Location within Texas Location within the United States
- Coordinates: 31°29′25″N 99°18′22″W
- Country: United States
- State: Texas
- County: Coleman
- Elevation: 1,394 ft (425 m)
- Time zone: UTC-6 (Central (CST))
  - Summer (DST): UTC-5 (CDT)
- Area code: 325
- GNIS feature ID: 1380777

Whon is an unincorporated community in Coleman County, Texas, United States. According to the Handbook of Texas, the community had a population of 15 in 2000.

== History ==
On May 2, 2007, an F1 tornado struck Whon. The tornado exited nearby Rockwood and continued damaging barns and trees for a couple of miles.

== Education ==
Jackson Lindsay was the first schoolteacher in Whon. The first school and teacherage in the community were built in the 1920s. Today, the community is served by the Santa Anna Independent School District.
