= Trickham, Texas =

- Unincorporated community
- Location within Texas Location within the United States
- Coordinates: 31°35′15″N 99°13′50″W
- Country: United States
- State: Texas
- County: Coleman
- Elevation: 1,424 ft (434 m)
- Time zone: UTC-6 (Central (CST))
  - Summer (DST): UTC-5 (CDT)
- Area code: 325
- GNIS feature ID: 1380676

Trickham is an unincorporated community in Coleman County, Texas, United States. According to the Handbook of Texas, the community had a population of 12 in 2000.

== History ==
On May 19, 2017, an EF0 tornado struck Trickham. It briefly kicked up debris but caused no noticeable damage.

== Geography ==
Trickham is located on Farm to Market Road 1176 on Mukewater Creek, 12 mi (19 km) southeast of Santa Anna and 20 mi (32 km) southeast of Coleman in southeastern Coleman County.

== Education ==
Trickham had its own school in 1884, which remained in operation until 1936. It was turned into a community center used by several groups, including a quilting club. Today, Trickham is served by the Santa Anna Independent School District.

== Notable person ==
- Leonidas L. Shield, who served on the 20th Texas Legislature.

== See also ==
- Farm to Market Road 586
- Farm to Market Road 567
