= Santa Anna High School =

Location
- 701 Bowie Street; Santa Anna, Texas 76878; United States; 31.73647°N 99.32405°W

Information
- School type: Public high school
- School district: Santa Anna Independent School District
- Principal: Laurie Hunter
- Teaching staff: 13.35 (FTE)
- Grades: 7-12
- Enrollment: 107 (2023–2024)
- Student to teacher ratio: 8.01
- Colors: Black & Gold
- Athletics conference: UIL Class A
- Mascot: Mountaineers/Lady Mountaineers
- Website: Santa Anna High School

Santa Anna High School is a public high school located in Santa Anna, Texas, United States and classified as a 1A school by the University Interscholastic League (UIL). It is part of the Santa Anna Independent School District located in central Coleman County. For the 2021-2022 school year, the school was given a "B" by the Texas Education Agency.

== Athletics ==
The Santa Anna Mountaineers compete in these sports -

- Basketball
- Cross Country
- 6-Man Football
- Softball
- Tennis
- Track and Field

== See also ==
List of Six-man football stadiums in Texas
