= National Register of Historic Places listings in Coleman County, Texas =

Location of Coleman County in Texas

This is a list of the National Register of Historic Places listings in Coleman County, Texas.

This is intended to be a complete list of properties listed on the National Register of Historic Places in Coleman County, Texas. There is one property listed on the National Register in the county.

This National Park Service list is complete through NPS recent listings posted March 21, 2025.

== Current listings ==
The publicly disclosed locations of National Register properties and districts may be seen in a mapping service provided.

	Name on the Register	Image	Date listed	Location	City or town	Description
1	Camp Colorado Replica	Camp Colorado Replica	April 19, 2018 (#100002345)	Coleman City Park, 1700 N Neches; 31°50′51″N 99°25′33″W	Coleman	

== See also ==
- National Register of Historic Places listings in Texas
- Recorded Texas Historic Landmarks in Coleman County
