= Silver Valley, Texas =

- Unincorporated community
- Location within Texas Location within the United States
- Coordinates: 31°57′23″N 99°32′46″W
- Country: United States
- State: Texas
- County: Coleman
- Elevation: 2,018 ft (615 m)
- Time zone: UTC-6 (Central (CST))
  - Summer (DST): UTC-5 (CDT)
- Area code: 325
- GNIS feature ID: 1380922

Silver Valley is an unincorporated community in Coleman County, Texas, United States. According to the Handbook of Texas, the community had a population of 20 in 2000.

== Geography ==
Silver Valley is located on U.S. Highway 84 on the Santa Fe Railroad, 10 mi (16 km) north of Coleman in northwestern Coleman County.

=== Climate ===
The climate in this area is characterized by hot, humid summers and generally mild to cool winters. According to the Köppen climate classification system, Silver Valley has a humid subtropical climate, abbreviated Cfa on climate maps.

== Education ==
Today, Silver Valley is served by the Coleman Independent School District.
