= U.S. Route 283 in Texas =

Segment of American highway

U.S. Highway 283
- US 283 highlighted in red

Route information
- Maintained by TxDOT
- Length: 150.45 mi (242.13 km)
- Existed: 1932–present

Major junctions
- South end: US 87 near Brady
- I-20 in Baird; US 183 near Throckmorton to Vernon
- North end: US 283 at the Oklahoma state line near Elmer, OK

Location
- Country: United States
- State: Texas
- Counties: McCulloch, Coleman, Callahan, Shackelford, Throckmorton, Baylor, Wilbarger

Highway system
- United States Numbered Highway System; List; Special; Divided; Highways in Texas; Interstate; US; State; Former; Toll; Loops; Spurs; FM/RM; Park; Rec
← SH 282	→ SH 284

U.S. Route 283 (US 283) is a United States Numbered Highway whose southern terminus is in the state of Texas near Brady. It runs primarily south–north through rural areas of the state, via towns and cities such as Coleman, Albany, and Seymour, before crossing the Red River into Oklahoma north of Vernon. At a length of 150 miles (241 km), US 283 in Texas is relatively short compared to other U.S. highways that travel the state.

== Route description ==
The southern terminus of US 283 is at an intersection with US 87 about three miles (4.8 km) northwest of Brady. The highway travels through rural areas of McCulloch County before entering Coleman County. US 283 maintains its rural route before entering the town of Santa Anna, beginning an overlap with US 84. The two highways travel northwest together to the town of Coleman before they split. US 283 returns to a rural route once again and intersects State Highway 36 (SH 36) in southern Callahan County. The highway runs through the city of Baird, where it crosses Interstate 20 (I-20). US 283 next enters the city of Albany, where it shares a short overlap with US 180 and SH 6. Just south of Throckmorton, US 283 begins a lengthy overlap with US 183. The two routes travel to Seymour and begin an overlap with US 277 and US 82. US 183 and US 283 separate from US 82 and US 277 in the unincorporated community of Mabelle. In Vernon, US 283 separates from US 183 at a junction with US 70 and US 287. US 283 runs in a slight northwest direction before crossing the Red River into Oklahoma.

The segment that is concurrent with US 84 in Coleman County and the segment that is concurrent with US 277 between Seymour and Mabelle are part of the National Highway System (NHS), a network of roads important to the country's economy, defense, and mobility.

== History ==
The US 283 route and number were originally approved by the American Association of State Highway Officials (AASHO) in 1930, and the route was officially listed as part of the Texas state highway system by 1932. Its southern terminus was originally near Brownwood in the vicinity of the present-day city of Early, which would be incorporated in 1951. It ran north along present-day US 183 to Rising Star and Cisco, then northwest to Albany along what is now SH 6, at which point it continued north into Oklahoma along its present route.

The segment of present-day US 283 between Albany and Throckmorton had been designated as part of the Southwest Trail, connecting Laredo to the Oklahoma state line near Burkburnett, in 1917. By 1922, the roadway connecting Cisco and Throckmorton was shown as part of SH 23. SH 23 was extended to Seymour in 1923 and via Vernon to the Oklahoma state line in 1925. The segment from Brownwood to Rising Star was designated as SH 129 in 1928, and it and US 283 were briefly cosigned until 1934, when SH 129 was cancelled. By 1935, US 283 and SH 23 were cosigned from Rising Star to the Oklahoma state line.

By the time the state highway system was redescribed in 1939, US 283 had replaced SH 23 from Brownwood to Brady and was extended to US 83 in Junction, replacing SH 9 between Brady and Mason and SH 29 between Mason and Junction. The codesignation with SH 23 was also removed, as that route was cancelled. AASHO had also approved the extension of US 183 into Texas that year; it overlapped US 283 from the Oklahoma state line to Albany, then ran over former SH 191 via Baird to Coleman, and replaced SH 16 to Brady. From here, US 87, US 183, and US 283 ran together to Mason, where US 87 separated and US 183 and US 283 continued concurrently to Junction. In 1940, TxDOT requested that the US 283 designation be removed between Brady and Junction, but this was denied by AASHO.

In 1951, the US 183 and US 283 designations were switched south of Albany, in anticipation of an extension of US 183 to Corpus Christi, and also to reduce the overlap in the two routes. US 283 took over the routing of US 183 from Albany to Brady; US 183 was rerouted to run from Early to Refugio, replacing SH 284 and SH 74, and overlapping SH 29. The roadway from Brady to Junction became part of an extended US 377. US 283 is indicated as having run concurrently with US 87 from its current southern terminus to the center of Brady until at least 1972.

In 1952, US 183 was rerouted along its current configuration from Cisco via Breckenridge to the current southern end of its concurrency with US 283 near Throckmorton, replacing SH 187 and a segment of SH 6. This was done to further reduce the concurrency of the two routes, and because it was desired to route US 183 over roadways that were superior and saw more traffic. The road between Albany and Cisco was renumbered as an extension of US 380, and would become part of SH 6 in 1971.

The US 84/US 283 bypass route around the east side of Coleman had been proposed by 1965. The project was let in 1968, and construction was completed by 1969. The section on the south side of Coleman that did not overlap SH 206 became an extension of FM 53 (now SH 153).

In 2006, US 283, along with US 183 and US 277, was redesignated to follow a new freeway bypass around Seymour. The bypass was completed in 2009, and the former route was retained on the state highway system as a business route.

== Junction list ==
County	Location	mi	km	Destinations	Notes
McCulloch		0.00	0.00	US 87 – San Angelo, Brady	
McCulloch				FM 1121 east – Rochelle	
McCulloch				FM 504 west – Pear Valley	
McCulloch				FM 765 – Millersview	
Coleman				FM 1026 west	
Coleman				FM 2633 south	
Coleman	Santa Anna			US 67 north / US 84 east – Brownwood	South end of US 67/84 overlap
Coleman	Santa Anna			US 67 south – San Angelo	North end of US 67 overlap
Coleman				FM 568 (Santa Anna Avenue)	
Coleman	Coleman			SH 153 west – Coleman, Winters	Interchange
Coleman	Coleman			FM 3425 north – Coleman Municipal Airport	
Coleman	Coleman			SH 206 south – Coleman	South end of SH 206 overlap
Coleman	Coleman			US 84 west – Abilene	North end of US 84 overlap
Coleman	Coleman			SH 206 north – Cross Plains	North end of SH 206 overlap
Coleman				FM 1274 west	
Callahan				FM 2926 west	
Callahan				SH 36 – Abilene, Cross Plains	
Callahan	Baird			I-20 BL (4th Street)	Former US 80
Callahan	Baird			I-20 – Abilene, Fort Worth	I-20 exit 307
Shackelford				FM 576 east – Moran	
Shackelford	Albany			US 180 west / SH 6 north – Anson, Stamford	South end of US 180/SH 6 overlap
Shackelford	Albany			SH 6 south / FM 1084 north – Cisco	North end of SH 6 overlap
Shackelford	Albany			US 180 east – Breckenridge	North end of US 180 overlap
Shackelford				FM 2482 east	
Shackelford				PR 58 north – Fort Griffin State Historical Site	
Shackelford				PR 54 east – Fort Griffin Campsite	
Throckmorton				FM 209 east – Woodson	
Throckmorton				US 183 south – Breckenridge	South end of US 183 overlap
Throckmorton				FM 923	
Throckmorton	Throckmorton			US 380 – Haskell, Newcastle	
Throckmorton	Throckmorton			SH 79 north – Archer City	
Baylor				US 277 south / Spur 334 – Stamford, Seymour	South end of US 277 overlap
Baylor				Bus. US 183 / Bus. US 277 / Bus. US 283 – Seymour	South end of freeway; no northbound entrance
Baylor				SH 114 – Lubbock, Jacksboro	No southbound entrance
Baylor				FM 422 – Seymour	
Baylor				US 82 west / Bus. US 183 / Bus. US 277 / Bus. US 283 – Seymour, Lubbock	North end of freeway; south end of US 82 overlap
Baylor	Mabelle			US 82 east / US 277 north / FM 1790 south – Wichita Falls	North end of US 82/277 overlap
Wilbarger				FM 1763 east	
Wilbarger				FM 2585 north	
Wilbarger				FM 433 west	South end of FM 433 overlap
Wilbarger				FM 433 east – Oklaunion	North end of FM 433 overlap
Wilbarger	Vernon			Bus. US 287 (Wilbarger Street)	
Wilbarger	Vernon			US 183 south / US 287 – Amarillo, Wichita Falls	North end of US 183 overlap
Wilbarger				FM 2072 east	
Wilbarger				FM 925 west	
Wilbarger				FM 924 – Chillicothe	
Wilbarger				FM 91 south – Chillicothe	
Wilbarger		150.45	242.13	US 283 north – Altus	Continuation into Oklahoma
1.000 mi = 1.609 km; 1.000 km = 0.621 mi: Concurrency terminus; Incomplete access

== Seymour business route ==
US 283 has one business route in Texas, inventoried as Business U.S. Highway 283-B (Bus. US 283-B), in Seymour. It runs concurrently with Business U.S. Highway 183-B (Bus. US 183-B) and Business U.S. Highway 277-C (Bus. US 277-C) for its entire length. The combined business route begins just south of the Seymour city limits at an interchange with the US 183/US 277/US 283 freeway bypass. It runs north along Main Street, intersecting Spur 334, before reaching a junction with SH 114 (Ingram Street). Westbound SH 114 runs concurrently with the business route until they reach US 82 (California Street). Here, westbound SH 114 turns onto westbound US 82, and FM 422 begins to the east. The business routes and eastbound US 82 run concurrently to the north, curving to the northeast at an intersection with RM Spur 1919, before meeting mainline RM 1919. Business US 183/US 277/US 283 end at another interchange with the US 183/US 277/US 283 bypass northeast of the city, with eastbound US 82 joining the other three routes toward Mabelle.

The business routes, along with Spur 334, were designated on August 24, 2006, while the designations of US 183, US 277, and US 283 were all shifted onto the freeway bypass to the south and east of Seymour. Upon completion of the bypass in 2009, the former route through the city along Main Street, along with the newly-constructed connection to the bypass, was redesignated Business US 183/US 277/US 283, while the 0.8-mile (1.3 km) former segment between the US 277 south cutoff and Main Street became Spur 334.

U.S. Route 283
Previous state: Terminus	Texas	Next state: Oklahoma
