= Webbville, Texas =

- Unincorporated community
- Location within Texas Location within the United States
- Coordinates: 32°1′48″N 99°16′36″W
- Country: United States
- State: Texas
- County: Coleman
- Elevation: 1,565 ft (477 m)
- Time zone: UTC-6 (Central (CST))
  - Summer (DST): UTC-5 (CDT)
- Area code: 325
- GNIS feature ID: 1379248

Webbville is an unincorporated community in Coleman County, Texas, United States. According to the Handbook of Texas, the community had a population of 50 in 2000.

== History ==
Webbville was home to Webb's Country Store in 1966. Its population was 50 from 1980 through 2000.

== Geography ==
Webbville is located at the terminus of Farm to Market Road 2806 in northeastern Coleman County.

== Education ==
Today, Webbville is served by the Cross Plains Independent School District.
