= Burkett, Texas =

- Unincorporated community
- Location within Texas Location within the United States
- Coordinates: 31°59′46″N 99°13′32″W
- Country: United States
- State: Texas
- County: Coleman
- Elevation: 1,558 ft (475 m)
- Time zone: UTC-6 (Central (CST))
  - Summer (DST): UTC-5 (CDT)
- Area code: 325
- GNIS feature ID: 1331677

Burkett is an unincorporated community in Coleman County, Texas, United States. According to the Handbook of Texas, the community had a population of 30 in 2000.

== History ==
Though unincorporated, Burkett has a post office, with the ZIP code of 76828.

On May 7, 1995, an F0 tornado struck Burkett. Three homes were damaged and a barn was destroyed. On April 26, 2015, another F0 tornado struck Burkett and was reported by an emergency manager. On May 26, 2016, an F1 tornado struck Burkett. A few trees and tree limbs were snapped, and outbuildings were damaged or destroyed. The community center in town sustained roof damage.

== Geography ==
Burkett is located on Texas State Highway 206 in northeastern Coleman County.

=== Climate ===
The climate in this area is characterized by hot, humid summers and generally mild to cool winters. According to the Köppen climate classification, Burkett has a humid subtropical climate, abbreviated Cfa on climate maps.

== Education ==
Burkett had its own school in 1940, which closed in 1957 and joined the Coleman and Cross Plains Independent School Districts.

== Notable people ==
- Robert E. Howard, pulp fiction author who created Conan the Barbarian.
- Jack Martin, basketball coach for the Lamar Cardinals.
