= Talpa-Centennial Independent School District =

Defunct school district in Texas, America

Talpa-Centennial School District was a public school district which served the community of Talpa, Texas (USA). Talpa-Centennial merged into the Mozelle Independent School District to form the Panther Creek Consolidated Independent School District.

== History ==
Before its consolidation, the district consisted of 371 square miles (960 km^{2}) miles. In 1981, it had managed two schools. The teacher-student ratio was approximately 10:1.

The last attempt to consolidate with Mozelle was in April 1973. Had both Mozelle and Talpa-Centennial consolidated in 1973, the name of the new school district would have been Blackwell Hill Consolidated Independent School District. Talpa-Centennial voters defeated the proposal.

Its board agreed to discuss a new proposed merger with Mozelle in January 1986. Talpa-Centennial now sought to consolidate for financial reasons after House Bill 72 passed in 1984. The merger resulted in an area of 600 miles squared. It was initially planned a $2 million bond would be passed to build a new school in the town of Voss and that the school would open in September 1987. The last evaluation of Talpa-Centennial ISD's tax base was at $50 million, $34 of which consisted of oil and gas.

The consolidation was approved. Results showed results of 284 votes in favor to 169 against the merger.

The proposed $2 million bond passed by a 60-point margin in July after the successful vote to consolidate. Funds would be made available only after the end of August. Talpa-Centennial facilities were still actively used through the 1986–1987 school year, where kindergarten through fifth-grade students would attend school. The superintendent of TCISD was hired as superintendent of the new PCCISD.

In 1997, over ten years after the consolidation with Mozelle, teachers talked about the positive aspects of the consolidation of the districts to the San Angelo Standard-Times in light of the proposed consolidation of the Miles and Veribest Independent School Districts. Because of the consolidation it was said Panther Creek High School achieved the six-man football state championship in 1992 and 1993.
