= Fisk, Texas =

- Unincorporated community
- Location within Texas Location within the United States
- Coordinates: 31°40′15″N 99°29′21″W
- Country: United States
- State: Texas
- County: Coleman
- Elevation: 1,667 ft (508 m)
- Time zone: UTC-6 (Central (CST))
  - Summer (DST): UTC-5 (CDT)
- Area code: 325
- GNIS feature ID: 1378295

Fisk is an unincorporated community in Coleman County, Texas, United States. According to the Handbook of Texas, the community had a population of 40 in 2000.

== History ==
The area in what is known as Fisk today grew up around the Adam T. Brown Ranch when it was broken up into other small portions for farmers in 1904. John Terry and other settlers built the first store and gin in the area. There were 70 people served by three businesses in 1940. The population went down to 40 from 1980 through 2000.

== Geography ==
Fisk is located on Farm to Market Road 1026, 3 mi (4.8 km) north of Mozelle in south-central Coleman County.

== Education ==
Today, Fisk is served by the Panther Creek Consolidated Independent School District.
