= Voss, Texas =

- Unincorporated community
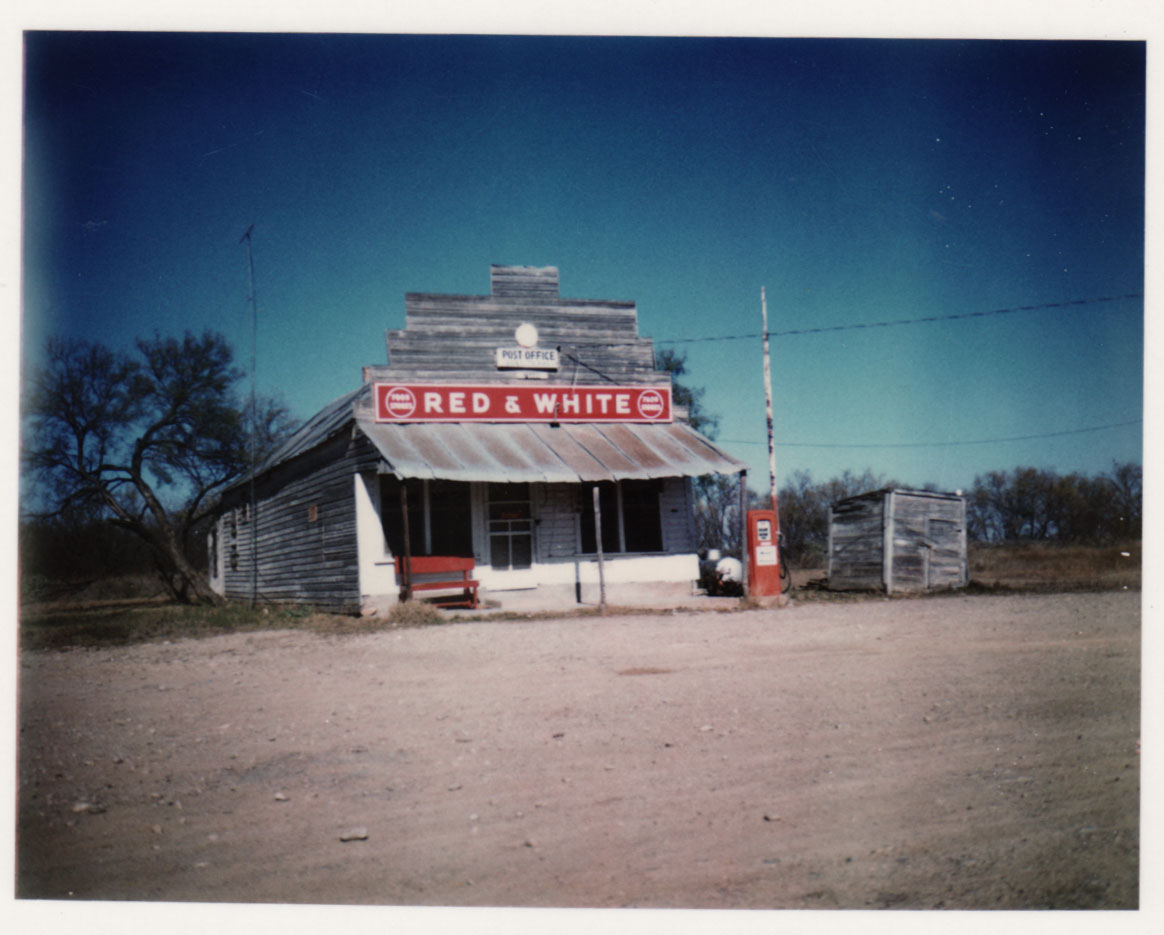
- The only building in Voss in 1972

- Location within Texas Location within the United States
- Coordinates: 31°37′16″N 99°33′42″W
- Country: United States
- State: Texas
- County: Coleman
- Elevation: 1,634 ft (498 m)
- Time zone: UTC-6 (Central (CST))
  - Summer (DST): UTC-5 (CDT)
- Area code: 325
- GNIS feature ID: 1380730

Voss is an unincorporated community in Coleman County, Texas, United States. It lies on Farm to Market Road 503 in the southwestern corner of the county, and as of the 2000 Census, had an estimated population of 20.

== History ==
Voss originally served as the headquarters for the Leaday Ranch. The community was subsequently named for the superintendent who filed paperwork for a post office. In 1904, the community had a variety of businesses, including three stores, two hotels, a blacksmith shop, a barbershop, and a gin alongside the post office. It then had six businesses serving 120 residents in 1946, but the population soon plummeted to 20 in 1980 with the post office remaining open. The population remained at 20 in 2000.

The community also had a horse shodding business and a Red & White food store is one of the businesses in the community.

== Geography ==
Voss is located on Farm to Market Road 503 in southwestern Coleman County. It is also on Farm to Market Road 1929. On December 1, 1957, FM 2134 was extended northeastward across the Colorado River to the community. Three Works Progress Administration bridges, as well as Leaday Crossing, also traveled through Voss.

== Climate ==
The climate in this area is characterized by hot, humid summers and generally mild to cool winters. According to the Köppen climate classification system, Voss has a humid subtropical climate, abbreviated Cfa on climate maps.

== Education ==
Voss had its own school in 1904. Voss is served by the Panther Creek Consolidated Independent School District. It was originally served by the Talpa Centennial Independent School District before it merged into Panther Creek.

== Notable person ==
- Bob Turner, a member of the Texas House of Representatives.
