= Camp Colorado Replica =

Historic Texas camp on National Register

- U.S. National Register of Historic Places
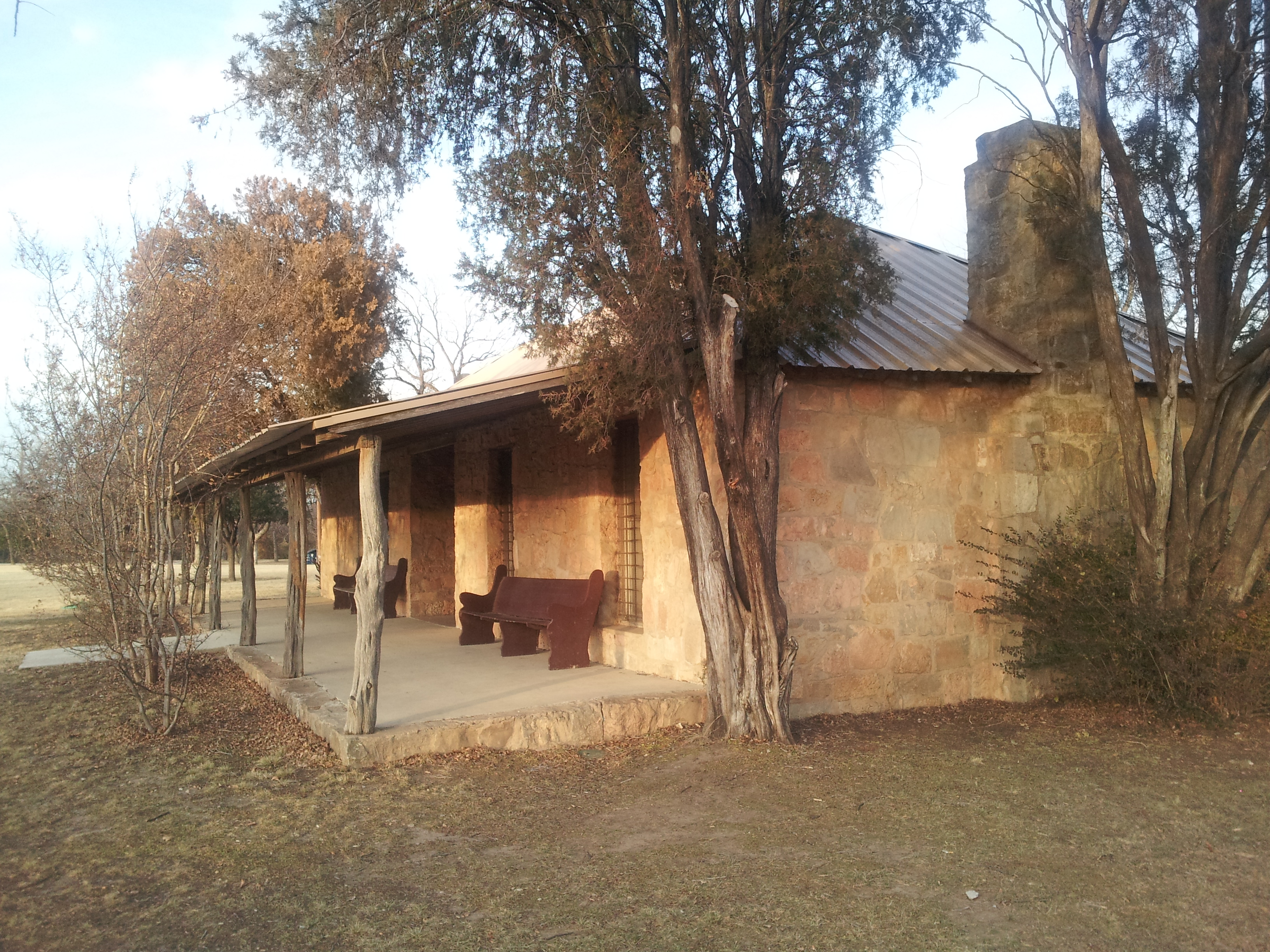

- Location within Texas Location within the United States
- Location: Coleman City Park, 1700 N. Neches, Coleman, Texas
- Coordinates: 31°50′51″N 99°25′33″W
- Area: less than one acre
- Built: 1936
- MPS: Monuments and Buildings of the Texas Centennial MPS
- NRHP reference No.: 100002345
- Added to NRHP: April 19, 2018

The Camp Colorado Replica, in Coleman, Texas, was listed on the National Register of Historic Places in 2018. It is located in Coleman City Park, at 1700 N Neches in Coleman.

It was built with assistance of a $3,600 grant from the Texas Centennial Commission, plus Works Progress Administration-funded labor.

Around the year 1855, the original Camp Colorado was located near the present-day community of Ebony, Texas in Mills County, but would be relocated to a site near Mukewater Creek in Coleman County only a year later in 1856. It functioned as part of a series of other military stations meant to function as a bulwark between settlements to the East and hostile Native American tribes. With the outbreak of the Civil War, all of the troops stationed at the camp joined the Confederate Army, except for one. Due to this mass exodus of soldiers, Camp Colorado was reoccupied by Texas Rangers until the end of the Civil War, whereupon it would be abandoned once more. Camp Colorado would remain unoccupied until fourteen years later, when an Englishman by the name of H.H. Sackett bought the land and used the old headquarters as his home.
