= Rockwood, Texas =

- Unincorporated community
- Location within Texas Location within the United States
- Coordinates: 31°30′04″N 99°22′24″W
- Country: United States
- State: Texas
- County: Coleman
- Elevation: 1,483 ft (452 m)
- Time zone: UTC-6 (Central (CST))
  - Summer (DST): UTC-5 (CDT)
- Postal code: 76873
- Area code: 325
- GNIS feature ID: 1366741

Rockwood is an unincorporated community in Coleman County, Texas, United States. According to the Handbook of Texas, the community had a population of 80 in 2000.

== History ==
Although it is unincorporated, Rockwood has a post office, with the ZIP code of 76873.

On May 2, 2007, an F1 tornado struck Rockwood. The tornado moved through the south side of the community damaging a few buildings, including their brand-new post office. The tornado exited town and continued another couple of miles damaging barns and trees.

== Geography ==
Rockwood is located on U.S. Highway 283 on Camp Creek, 23 mi (37 km) south of Coleman and four miles north of the Colorado River in southern Coleman County.

== Education ==
Rockwood had its own school in 1926 and closed in 1955. Today, the community is served by the Santa Anna Independent School District.
