= Panther Creek High School (Valera, Texas) =

Public school in Valera, Texas

Location
- 129 PR 3421; Valera, Texas 76884-2009; United States; 31.638046°N 99.552977°W

Information
- School type: Public high school
- Motto: Pride, Progress, Performance
- Established: 1985
- School district: Panther Creek Consolidated Independent School District
- Superintendent: Dwin Nanny
- Principal: Dwin Nanny
- Staff: 21.06 (FTE)
- Grades: PK-12
- Enrollment: 161 (2023–2024)
- Student to teacher ratio: 7.64
- Colors: Black & White, Accents Red & Silver
- Athletics conference: UIL Class A
- Mascot: Panthers/Lady Panthers
- Website: Panther Creek High School

Panther Creek High School is a public high school located 8 miles south of Valera, Texas, United States, on FM 503; it is classified as a 1A school by the University Interscholastic League. It is part of the Panther Creek Consolidated Independent School District located in southwestern Coleman County. It is a 1985 consolidation of Talpa-Centennial and Mozelle. For the 2021-2022 school year, the school was given a "B" by the Texas Education Agency.

== Athletics ==
The Panther Creek Panthers compete in these sports:

- Basketball
- Cross-country running
- Six-man football
- Golf
- Tennis
- Track and field
- volleyball

=== State titles ===
- Football (six-man) 1992, 1993, 2000
