= Farm to Market Road 374 =

Highway in Texas, United States

Farm to Market Road 374

Route information
- Maintained by TxDOT
- Length: 5.1 mi (8.2 km)
- Existed: 1954–present

Major junctions
- West end: SH 206 in Cross Plains
- SH 36
- East end: FM 569 in Pioneer

Location
- Country: United States
- State: Texas

Highway system
- Highways in Texas; Interstate; US; State; Former; Toll; Loops; Spurs; FM/RM; Park; Rec
← FM 373	→ FM 375

Farm to Market Road 374 (FM 374) is a two-lane, state-maintained highway in the U.S. state of Texas that connects the farming areas of Cross Plains and Pioneer with State Highway 36 and State Highway 206. The highway continues from Cross Plains eastward through eastern Callahan County and connects in Eastland County with SH 36. After a 0.5-mile (0.8 km) gap at SH 36, FM 374 continues east to Pioneer, Texas.

== Route description ==
FM 374 begins at an intersection with SH 206 in Cross Plains, Callahan County, heading east on two-lane undivided SE First Street. The road passes a few businesses before heading into residential areas. The highway leaves Cross Plains and enters open farmland with occasional trees and homes as an unnamed road. FM 374 crosses into Eastland County and turns south, coming to an intersection with SH 36. At this point, there is a gap in FM 374, with the highway heading east from SH 36 after 0.5 miles (0.8 km). FM 374 heads through more agricultural areas with some trees and residences, ending at an intersection with FM 569 in Pioneer.

== History ==
The FM 374 designation was first used on June 25, 1945 for a road running from SH 199 in Megargel to a point 6.6 miles (10.6 km) to the northeast in Archer County. On May 23, 1951, FM 374 was extended northeast to SH 25 west of Archer City, with the portion of the extension from 4.9 miles west of SH 25 to SH 25 replacing FM 1196. The highway was extended 2.6 miles (4.2 km) south of Megargel on January 23, 1953. On October 28, 1953, the highway was extended southwest to the Young County line. The FM 374 designation was removed from this routing on December 10, 1953, as it was replaced by FM 210. On September 27, 1954, the current FM 374 was designated to run from FM 880 (now SH 206) in Cross Plains east to SH 36, replacing a former routing of SH 36. On September 5, 1973, FM 374 was designated onto the road connecting SH 36 to FM 569.

== Major intersections ==
County	Location	mi	km	Destinations	Notes
Callahan	Cross Plains	0.000	0.000	SH 206 (Main Street)	
Eastland				SH 36	1/2 mile gap on SH 36
Eastland	Pioneer	5.131	8.258	FM 569	
1.000 mi = 1.609 km; 1.000 km = 0.621 mi
