= Gouldbusk, Texas =

- Unincorporated community
- Location within Texas Location within the United States
- Coordinates: 31°33′18″N 99°28′36″W
- Country: United States
- State: Texas
- County: Coleman
- Elevation: 1,513 ft (461 m)
- Time zone: UTC-6 (Central (CST))
  - Summer (DST): UTC-5 (CDT)
- Postal code: 76845
- Area code: 325
- GNIS feature ID: 1358215

Gouldbusk is an unincorporated community in Coleman County, Texas, United States. According to the Handbook of Texas, the community had a population of 70 in 2000.

== History ==
The community was named for English settler William Gould-Busk, who bought the Starkweather ranch about 1886. It soon grew when the land around the area was sold for more farms in 1903. It then became a shipping port for cotton and had a post office. Alongside the post office, the community also had a cotton gin, six businesses, and 150 inhabitants in 1940, which then plunged to 70 in 1980, after World War II. The population remained at that level in 2000.

Although it is unincorporated, Gouldbusk has a post office with the ZIP code 76845.

== Geography ==
Gouldbusk is located 6 mi (9.7 km) west of Farm to Market Road 1026 and 20 mi (32 km) south of Coleman in south-central Coleman County.

== Education ==
Gouldbusk is served by the Panther Creek Consolidated Independent School District.

== Notable people ==
- Shirla Jean Rathjen Howard, wife of former Missouri politician Jerry Thomas Howard, is from Gouldbusk.
