= Goldsboro, Texas =

- Unincorporated community
- Location within Texas Location within the United States
- Coordinates: 32°03′37″N 99°40′52″W
- Country: United States
- State: Texas
- County: Coleman
- Elevation: 1,942 ft (592 m)
- Time zone: UTC-6 (Central (CST))
  - Summer (DST): UTC-5 (CDT)
- Area code: 325
- GNIS feature ID: 1378365

Goldsboro is an unincorporated community in Coleman County, Texas, United States. According to the Handbook of Texas, the community had an estimated population of 30 in 2000.

== History ==
The Pecos Valley and Northern Texas Railway was what established Goldsboro in 1910-1911. It was given this name for the gold color of stones in the nearby hills. The community had 100 residents served by two businesses in 1940. The population dropped to 30 from 1980 to 2000.

On March 14, 1982, an F3 tornado struck Goldsboro. The community sustained significant damage; one home was mostly destroyed in this area. The tornado also flattened an oil rig.

== Geography ==
Goldsboro is on U.S. Highway 84 in northwestern Coleman County.

== Education ==
Goldsboro is served by the Coleman Independent School District.

== Notable person ==
- Frances Daisy Emery Allen, pioneering physician who moved her practice to Goldsboro in 1910. Her daughter, Sheila, was born here.
