= Jerry Thomas Howard =

American politician (1936–2026)

Jerry Thomas Howard (March 28, 1936 – September 17, 2026) was an American Democratic politician who served in the Missouri Senate and the Missouri House of Representatives.

== Life and career ==
Born in Oak Ridge, Missouri, on March 28, 1936, Howard graduated from Central High School in Cape Girardeau, Missouri, and from Southeast Missouri State University with a bachelor's degree in agriculture and biology. He worked in the agribusiness and horse breeding fields, served in the U.S. Army during the Korean War, and also served 16 years in the Missouri National Guard.

His wife Shirla Jean Rathjen Howard from Gouldbusk, Texas, died June 17, 2015, at the Howards' hometown of Dexter, Missouri. They had been married for over 40 years.

Howard died in Memphis, Tennessee, on September 17, 2026, at the age of 90.
