= Glen Cove, Texas =

- Unincorporated community
- Location within Texas Location within the United States
- Coordinates: 31°51′57″N 99°38′15″W
- Country: United States
- State: Texas
- County: Coleman
- Elevation: 1,985 ft (605 m)
- Time zone: UTC-6 (Central (CST))
  - Summer (DST): UTC-5 (CDT)
- Area code: 325
- GNIS feature ID: 1378361

Glen Cove is an unincorporated community in Coleman County, Texas, United States. According to the Handbook of Texas, the community had a population of 40 in 2000.

== Geography ==
Glen Cove is located on Farm to Market Road 53 on Hords Creek in west-central Coleman County. It is also on Farm to Market Road 2805.

=== Climate ===
The climate in this area is characterized by hot, humid summers and generally mild to cool winters. According to the Köppen climate classification system, Glen Cove has a humid subtropical climate, abbreviated Cfa on climate maps.

== Education ==
Today, Glen Cove is served by the Panther Creek Consolidated Independent School District.
