= Texas State Highway 279 =

State highway in Texas

State Highway 279
- SH 279, highlighted in red

Route information
- Maintained by TxDOT
- Length: 3 mi (4.8 km)
- Existed: 1938–present

Major junctions
- South end: US 67 / US 84 in Brownwood
- North end: SH 206 south of Cross Plains

Location
- Country: United States
- State: Texas

Highway system
- Highways in Texas; Interstate; US; State; Former; Toll; Loops; Spurs; FM/RM; Park; Rec
← SH 278	→ SH 280

State Highway 279 (SH 279) is a Texas state highway that runs from Cross Plains south to Brownwood. The route was designated on October 25, 1938 from Brownwood north to the Lake Brownwood State Park, and was extended north to Cross Plains on August 23, 1945. On September 26, 1945, the section of SH 279 in Lake Brownwood state park was cancelled, and SH 279 was rerouted more directly from Brownwood to Cross Plains, replacing FM 602.

== Junction list ==
County	Location	mi	km	Destinations	Notes
Brown	Brownwood			US 67 / US 84	
Brown	Brownwood			FM 2524	
Brown				FM 2125	
Brown				FM 2632	
Brown				FM 1849	
Brown				FM 2492	
Brown				FM 3021	
Brown				PR 15 – Lake Brownwood State Park	
Brown				FM 1850	
Brown				FM 2940	
Callahan				SH 206	
1.000 mi = 1.609 km; 1.000 km = 0.621 mi
