= Bob Turner (Texas politician) =

American politician (1934–2022)

Member of the Texas House of Representatives
- In office March 6, 1991 – January 14, 2003

Personal details
- Born: Robert Ray Turner; August 10, 1934
- Died: June 19, 2022 (aged 87) Coleman, Texas, U.S.
- Party: Democratic
- Profession: Politician

Robert Ray Turner (August 10, 1934 – June 19, 2022) was an American politician. A Democrat, he served as a member of the Texas House of Representatives from 1991 to 2003. He died June 19, 2022, at age 87.
