= Coleman Municipal Airport =

Airport in Coleman County, Texas

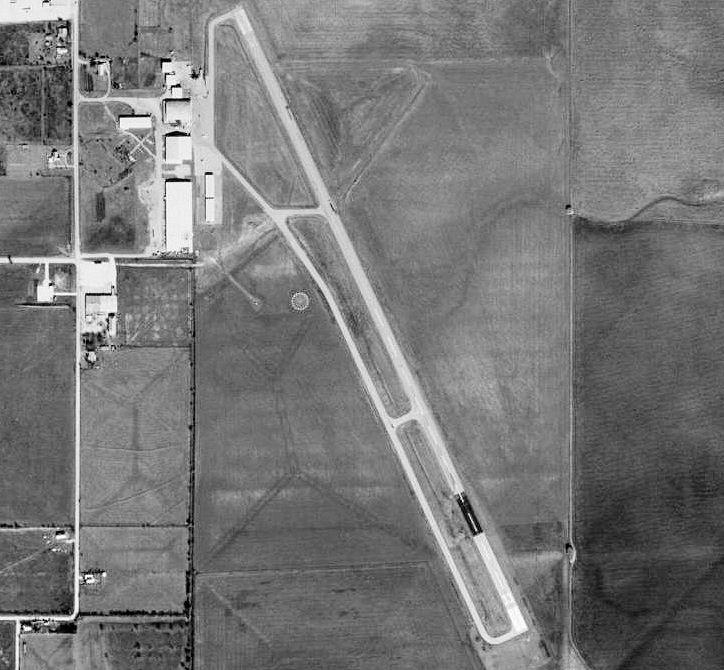
- 1994 USGS Photo
- IATA: COM; ICAO: KCOM

Summary
- Airport type: Public
- Owner: City of Coleman
- Location: Coleman, Texas
- Elevation AMSL: 1,697 ft / 517 m
- Coordinates: 31°50′28″N 99°24′12″W
- Interactive map of Coleman Municipal Airport

Runways
Direction	Length		Surface
Direction	ft	m	Surface
15/33	4,503	1,373	Asphalt

Coleman Flying School 1943 Classbook

Coleman Municipal Airport (IATA: COM, ICAO: KCOM) is an airport two miles northeast of Coleman, Texas.

== History ==
Opened on 1 October 1941. Began training United States Army Air Corps flying cadets under contract to Coleman Flying School under 304th Flying Training Detachment. Assigned to United States Army Air Forces Gulf Coast Training Center (later Central Flying Training Command) as a primary (level 1) pilot training airfield. had four local axillary airfields for emergency and overflow landings. Flying training was performed with Fairchild PT-19s as the primary trainer. Also had several PT-17 Stearmans assigned.

Inactivated on 16 October 1944, with the drawdown of AAFTC's pilot training program. Declared surplus and turned over to the Army Corps of Engineers on 30 September 1945. Eventually discharged to the War Assets Administration (WAA) and became a civil airport.

Airline flights (Trans-Texas DC-3s) ended in 1957.

== See also ==
- Texas World War II Army Airfields
- 31st Flying Training Wing (World War II)
- List of airports in Texas
