= Quicuchabe =

The Quicuchabe were one of 20 groups of American Indians who chose to join Juan Domínguez de Mendoza on his trek across Texas from the area of El Paso to the area around what is now San Angelo between 1683 and 1684. Mendoza did not indicate at what point the Quicuchabe joined his party; consequently, ascertaining where, exactly, they lived, and with what tribe they were affiliated is impossible. As the tribes between the Pecos River and the vicinity of San Angelo were being pushed by the Apache, the Quicuchabe likely originated somewhere in that general area.

== See also ==
Handbook of Texas entry
