= Santa Anna, Texas =

- Town
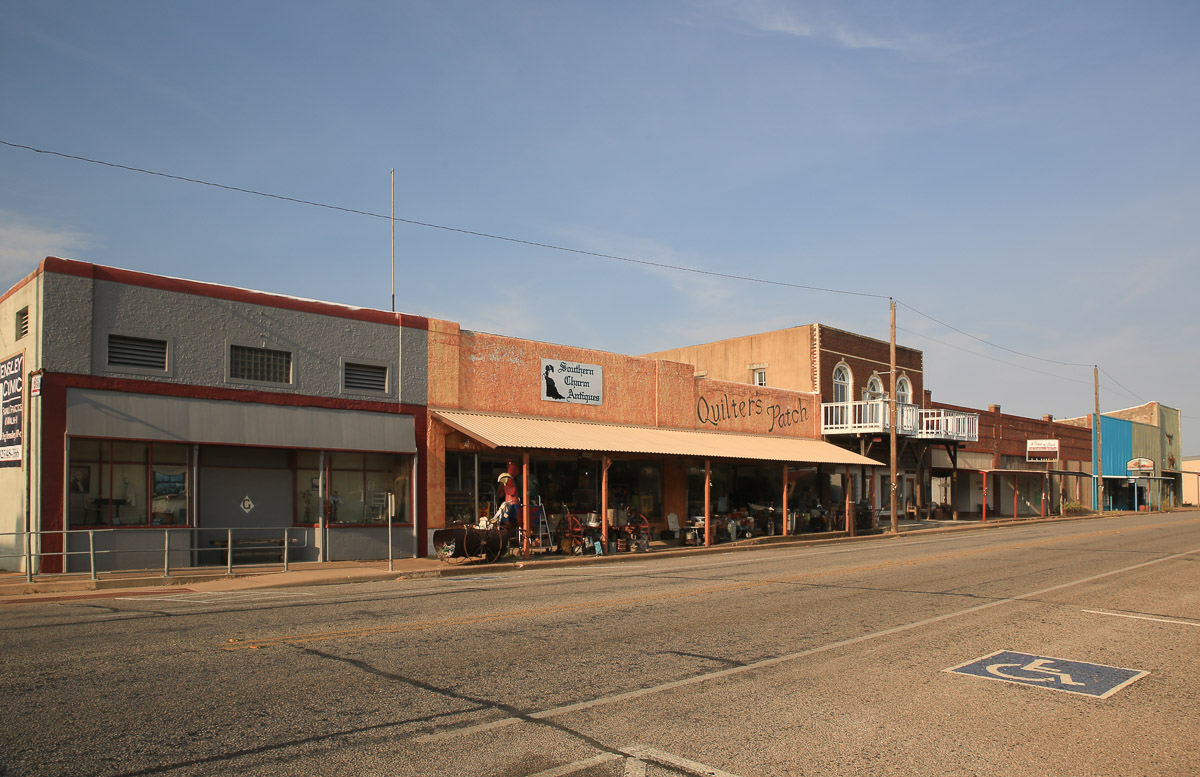
- Downtown Santa Anna

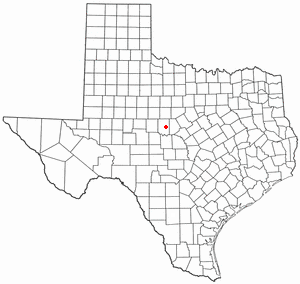
- Location of Santa Anna, Texas
- Coordinates: 31°44′13″N 99°19′32″W
- Country: United States
- State: Texas
- County: Coleman

Area
  - Total: 1.99 sq mi (5.16 km^{2})
  - Land: 1.99 sq mi (5.16 km^{2})
  - Water: 0 sq mi (0.00 km^{2})
- Elevation: 1,723 ft (525 m)

Population (2020)
  - Total: 1,014
  - Density: 509/sq mi (197/km^{2})
- Time zone: UTC-6 (Central (CST))
  - Summer (DST): UTC-5 (CDT)
- ZIP code: 76878
- Area code: Area code 325
- FIPS code: 48-65672
- GNIS feature ID: 2413258
- Website: www.santaannatex.org

Santa Anna is a town in Coleman County in Central Texas, United States. Its population was 1,014 at the 2020 census.

== Geography ==
Santa Anna is located in east central Coleman County. Three U.S. highways pass through the center of town. U.S. Route 283 leads south 44 miles (71 km) to Brady, U.S. Route 67 leads west 39 miles (63 km) to Ballinger, while U.S. Route 84 and US 283 together lead northwest 9 miles (14 km) to Coleman, the county seat, and US 67 and 84 together lead east 21 miles (34 km) to Brownwood.

According to the United States Census Bureau, the town has a total area of 2.0 square miles (5.2 km^{2}), all of it land.

=== Climate ===
The climate in this area is characterized by hot, humid summers and generally mild to cool winters. According to the Köppen climate classification system, Santa Anna has a humid subtropical climate, Cfa on climate maps.

== History ==
The twin mesas in central Coleman County, known as the Santa Anna Mountains, historically served as a geographic landmark. Early maps of Texas identified the formation near the center of the state with the notation "Santa Anna's Peaks." Both the peaks and the nearby town were named for the Comanche war chief Santanna, or Santa Anna.

Texas Rangers camped at the foot of the mountain long before the area was settled. Cattle drives from South Texas to the northern markets passed through the gap in the mountain along a military road. This road helped supply the outpost forts along the Texas Forts Trail. The first permanent European-American settlers soon built homes near a freshwater spring at the foot of the mountain. One enterprising settler stocked a supply of goods for trail drivers and settlers, starting the first business at "The Gap" in the early 1870s. In 1879, a petition to open a post office was filed, and the name of "Santa Anna" was chosen.

During the construction of the Santa Fe Railroad, a group of residents bought land along the right-of-way. Stone buildings were built from limestone quarried from the cap rock of the west mountain. Several businesses moved from Trickham and Brownwood to be a part of the new community. In 1886, The Santa Anna News was established. The first telephone in the county was a private line from Brownwood to Coleman, connected in the Melton Hotel in Santa Anna. A small local exchange was opened in 1892. A drugstore and a bank were opened in the 1880s, and a one-room school was opened that soon expanded to four rooms.

As the open range was preempted and sold, land was cultivated, with cotton the principal crop. Santa Anna eventually had four cotton gins in operation, and was also a major rail shipping point for livestock. The town became a trade center with a thriving business district that included drugstores, hotels, banks, livery stables, and produce houses. One of the early buildings, still a landmark downtown, housed an opera house, where traveling groups and local performers provided entertainment and culture.

After World War I, Dr. T.R. Sealy established a hospital that soon became widely known. A nursing school was founded in the 1920s to provide trained nurses, continuing until the death of Dr. Sealy in the mid-1930s.

During the first half of the 20th century, Santa Anna thrived as a small farming and ranching community. It later developed businesses related to the area oil industry.

Since the beginning of the 21st century, tourism has emerged as a new industry in Santa Anna. Currently, 38 businesses are located in Santa Anna, of which 13 are less than three years old. Custom hand-crafted furniture has become a hallmark of the city. Other popular draws include numerous antique stores, furniture stores, and specialty shops. Santa Anna and the surrounding area are also popular among dove, quail, turkey, and deer hunters.

== Demographics ==
Historical population
Census	Pop.	Note	%±
1890	468		—
1910	1,453		—
1920	1,407		−3.2%
1930	1,883		33.8%
1940	1,661		−11.8%
1950	1,605		−3.4%
1960	1,320		−17.8%
1970	1,310		−0.8%
1980	1,535		17.2%
1990	1,249		−18.6%
2000	1,081		−13.5%
2010	1,099		1.7%
2020	1,014		−7.7%
U.S. Decennial Census

=== 2020 census ===
Santa Anna racial composition (NH = Non-Hispanic) (Note: Note: the US Census treats Hispanic/Latino as an ethnic category. This table excludes Latinos from the racial categories and assigns them to a separate category. Hispanics/Latinos can be of any race.)
Race	Number	Percentage
White (NH)	714	70.41%
Black or African American (NH)	37	3.65%
Native American or Alaska Native (NH)	1	0.1%
Asian (NH)	1	0.1%
Some Other Race (NH)	2	0.2%
Mixed/Multi-Racial (NH)	46	4.54%
Hispanic or Latino	213	21.01%
Total	1,014	

As of the 2020 United States census, there were 1,014 people, 405 households, and 268 families residing in the town.

=== 2000 census ===
As of the census of 2000, 1,081 people, 446 households, and 283 families resided in the town. The population density was 558.0 inhabitants per square mile (215.4/km^{2}). The 574 housing units averaged 296.3 per square mile (114.2/km^{2}). The racial makeup of the town was 88.90% White, 3.89% African American, 0.65% Native American, 0.09% Pacific Islander, 4.72% from other races, and 1.76% from two or more races. Hispanics or Latinos of any race were 19.06% of the population.

Of the 446 households, 28.5% had children under the age of 18 living with them, 47.1% were married couples living together, 12.3% had a female householder with no husband present, and 36.5% were not families. About 34.5% of all households were made up of individuals, and 18.6% had someone living alone who was 65 years of age or older. The average household size was 2.36 and the average family size was 3.01.

In the town, the population was distributed as 26.3% under the age of 18, 7.8% from 18 to 24, 21.6% from 25 to 44, 23.4% from 45 to 64, and 20.9% who were 65 years of age or older. The median age was 41 years. For every 100 females, there were 91.3 males. For every 100 females age 18 and over, there were 86.2 males.

The median income for a household in the town was $22,857, and for a family was $31,250. Males had a median income of $29,886 versus $17,917 for females. The per capita income for the town was $11,065. About 20.4% of families and 23.2% of the population were below the poverty line, including 26.6% of those under age 18 and 24.4% of those age 65 or over.

== Education ==
The town is served by the Santa Anna Independent School District.

== Notable people ==
- Louis Crump, Texas state senator
- Bobby Layne, Pro Football Hall of Fame quarterback

== Gallery ==
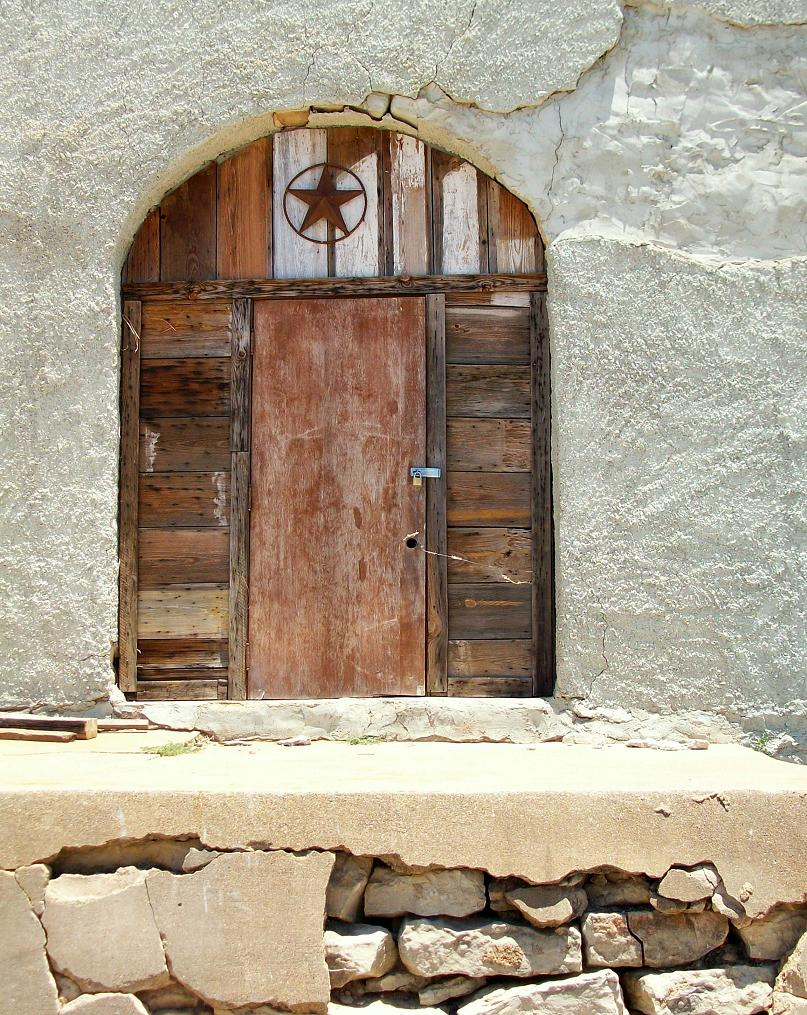
Sights near main street

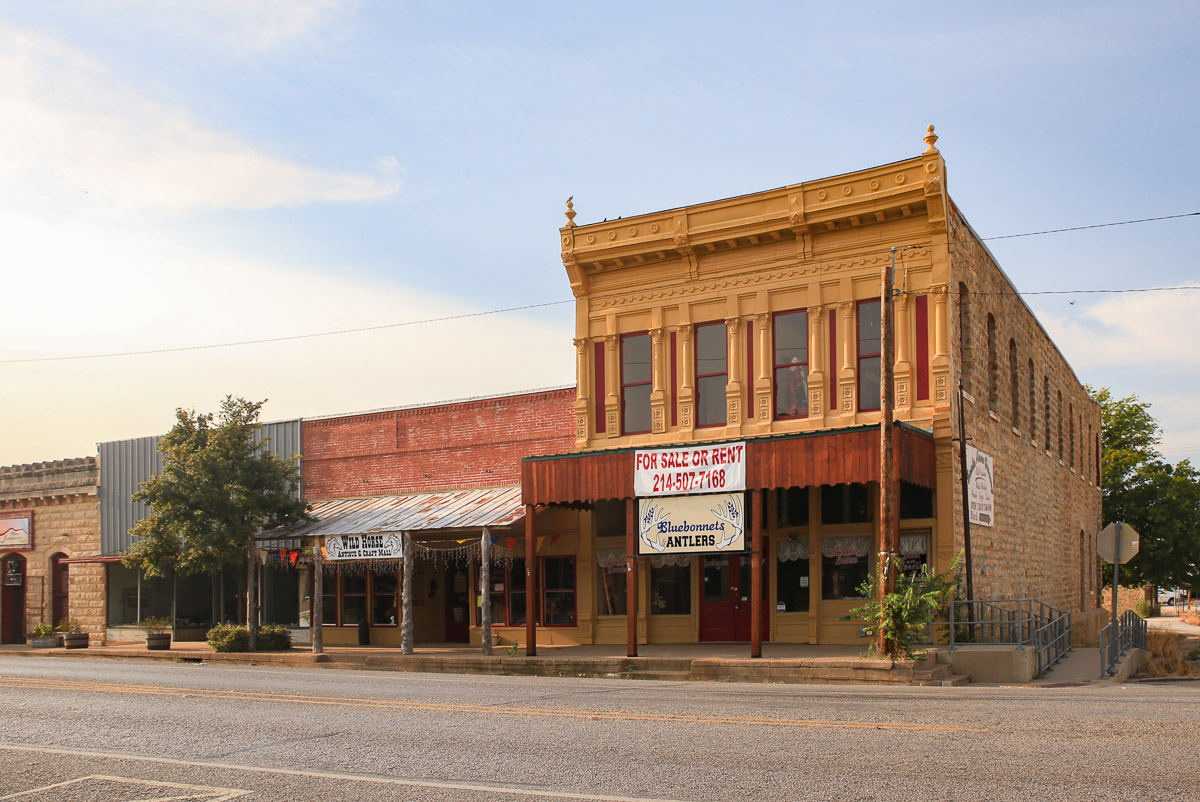
Downtown Santa Anna

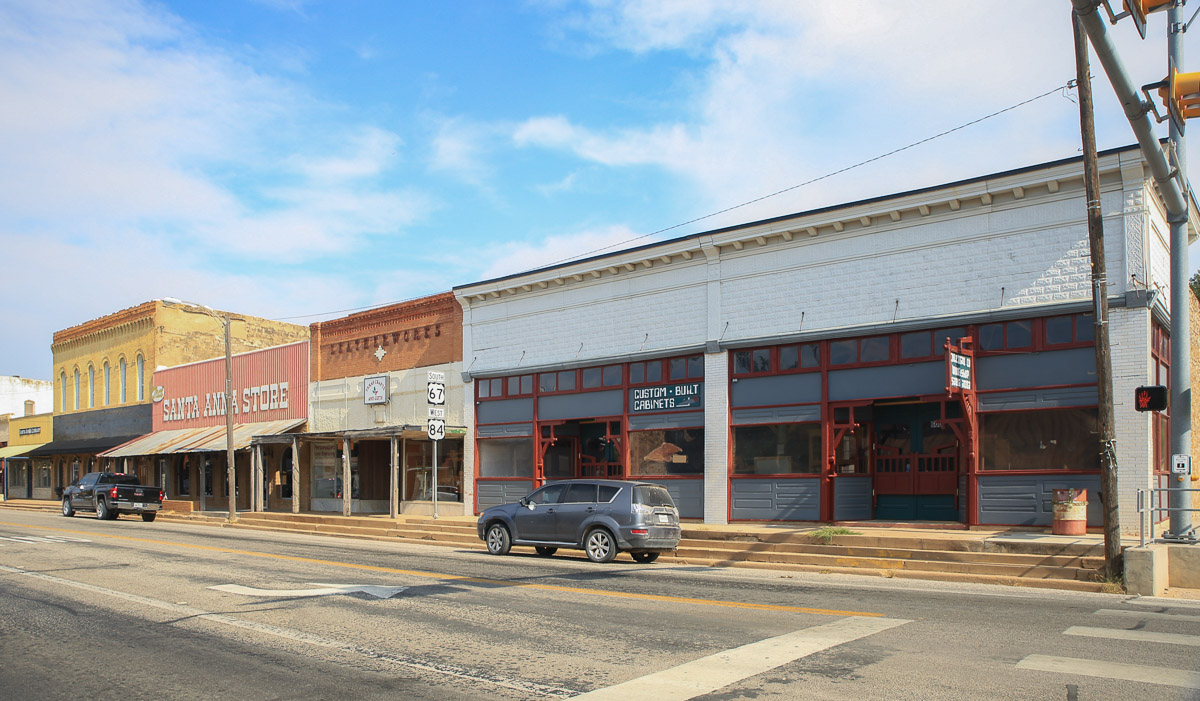
Downtown Santa Anna

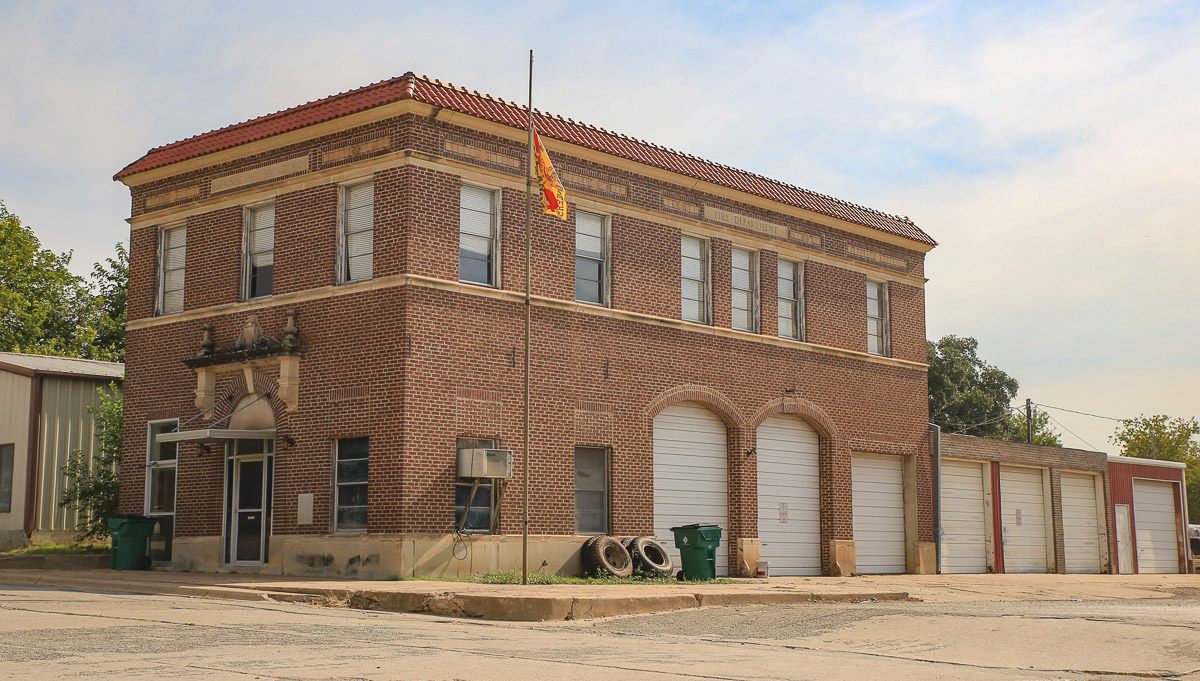
City Hall and Fire Department in Santa Anna, Texas
