= Mereta, Texas =

Mereta
- Unincorporated community
- Location within the state of Texas Mereta (the United States)
- Coordinates: 31°27′26″N 100°8′27″W
- Country: United States
- State: Texas
- County: Tom Green
- Elevation: 1,755 ft (535 m)
- Time zone: UTC-6 (Central (CST))
  - Summer (DST): UTC-5 (CDT)
- ZIP codes: 76940
- GNIS feature ID: 1362628

Mereta (also Fisherville or Lipan) is an unincorporated community in eastern Tom Green County, Texas, United States. It lies along local roads east of the city of San Angelo, the county seat of Tom Green County. Its elevation is 1,755 feet (535 m). Although Mereta is unincorporated, it has a post office, with the ZIP code of 76940; the ZCTA for ZIP Code 76940 had a population of 138 at the 2000 census.

Mereta was named by the local postmaster in honor of twin sisters, named Meta and Reta, who lived in the area in 1902. The community itself was platted in 1904.
