= Cross Plains, Texas =

- Town
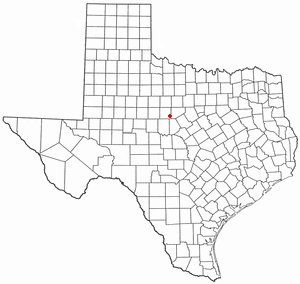
- Location of Cross Plains, Texas

- Coordinates: 32°07′27″N 99°09′56″W
- Country: United States
- State: Texas
- County: Callahan

Area
  - Total: 1.20 sq mi (3.11 km^{2})
  - Land: 1.20 sq mi (3.11 km^{2})
  - Water: 0 sq mi (0.00 km^{2})
- Elevation: 1,736 ft (529 m)

Population (2020)
  - Total: 899
  - Density: 749/sq mi (289/km^{2})
- Time zone: UTC−6 (Central (CST))
  - Summer (DST): UTC−5 (CDT)
- ZIP Code: 76443
- Area code: 254
- FIPS code: 48-17816
- GNIS feature ID: 2412390
- Website: www.crossplains.org

Cross Plains is a town in Callahan County, Texas, United States. The population was 899 at the 2020 census, down from 982 at the 2010 census. It is part of the Abilene, Texas Metropolitan Statistical Area.

== History ==
Cross Plains was settled in the late 19th century and was known as Turkey Creek and Schleicher before a post office opened in 1877 under the name Cross Plains. The town experienced rapid growth in the 1880s, going from 25 people in 1880 to 175 by 1885. The population was 600 in 1911, the year the town was incorporated. The Missouri, Kansas and Texas Railroad was built through the town in 1912, which, combined with the discovery of oil near the city in 1925, led to a business boom. The population surpassed 1,200 by 1940 and remained stable until declining after the 1970s.

The Cross Plains City Council voted to disband the city police department in June 2026 after a Texas Commission on Law Enforcement investigation found that the department failed to meet state safety standards.

=== 2005 wildfire ===
On December 27, 2005, a grass/range wildfire destroyed 116 homes in and around Cross Plains. On December 29, 2005, the Texas Department of Public Safety listed 85 single family homes, 25 mobile homes and 6 apartment units as being destroyed. An additional 36 homes were damaged. The First United Methodist Church building of Cross Plains was also destroyed. Two people died after being trapped in their houses.

The fire started 5 miles (8 km) west of the city along Highway 36, and westerly winds of up to 30 miles per hour (48 km/h) spread the flames into town, burning a total of 7,665 acres (31.0 km^{2}) of land.

== Geography ==
Cross Plains is located in southeastern Callahan County. State highways 36 and 206 cross in the southern part of town, with Highway 36 leading northwest 45 miles (72 km) to Abilene and southeast 39 miles (63 km) to Comanche, while Highway 206 leads northeast 23 miles (37 km) to Cisco and southwest 27 miles (43 km) to Coleman.

According to the United States Census Bureau, Cross Plains has a total area of 1.2 square miles (3.1 km^{2}), all land.

=== Climate ===
The climate in this area is characterized by hot, humid summers and generally mild to cool winters. According to the Köppen Climate Classification system, Cross Plains has a humid subtropical climate, abbreviated "Cfa" on climate maps.

== Demographics ==
Historical population
Census	Pop.	Note	%±
1920	700		—
1930	1,507		115.3%
1940	1,229		−18.4%
1950	1,305		6.2%
1960	1,168		−10.5%
1970	1,192		2.1%
1980	1,240		4.0%
1990	1,063		−14.3%
2000	1,068		0.5%
2010	982		−8.1%
2020	899		−8.5%
U.S. Decennial Census

=== 2020 census ===
Cross Plains racial composition (NH = Non-Hispanic) (Note: Note: the US Census treats Hispanic/Latino as an ethnic category. This table excludes Latinos from the racial categories and assigns them to a separate category. Hispanics/Latinos can be of any race.)
Race	Number	Percentage
White (NH)	789	87.76%
Native American or Alaska Native (NH)	9	1.0%
Asian (NH)	1	0.11%
Some Other Race (NH)	1	0.11%
Mixed/Multi-Racial (NH)	21	2.34%
Hispanic or Latino	78	8.68%
Total	899	

As of the 2020 United States census, there were 899 people, 477 households, and 294 families residing in the town.

=== 2000 census ===
As of the census of 2000, there were 1,068 people, 432 households, and 285 families residing in the town. The population density was 893.1 inhabitants per square mile (344.8/km^{2}). There were 554 housing units at an average density of 463.3 per square mile (178.9/km^{2}). The racial makeup of the town was 97.28% White, 0.47% Native American, 1.69% from other races, and 0.56% from two or more races. Hispanic or Latino of any race were 5.34% of the population.

There were 432 households, out of which 28.9% had children under the age of 18 living with them, 50.2% were married couples living together, 10.6% had a female householder with no husband present, and 33.8% were non-families. 32.2% of all households were made up of individuals, and 19.4% had someone living alone who was 65 years of age or older. The average household size was 2.40 and the average family size was 3.03.

In the town, the population was spread out, with 25.1% under the age of 18, 7.3% from 18 to 24, 21.7% from 25 to 44, 22.4% from 45 to 64, and 23.5% who were 65 years of age or older. The median age was 42 years. For every 100 females, there were 84.1 males. For every 100 females age 18 and over, there were 81.0 males.

The median income for a household in the town was $22,235, and the median income for a family was $27,500. Males had a median income of $22,188 versus $17,955 for females. The per capita income for the town was $13,284. About 18.5% of families and 23.3% of the population were below the poverty line, including 33.3% of those under age 18 and 19.0% of those age 65 or over.

== Education ==
The town is served by the Cross Plains Independent School District and is home to the Cross Plains High School Buffaloes.

In 2004, voters passed a $1.1 million bond package for new classrooms and gymnasium for the Cross Plains Independent School District.

While CPISD has had an average enrollment of approximately 455 students in the 1990s-2000s, an average of 358 students have been enrolled each year since 2010.

== Robert E. Howard ==
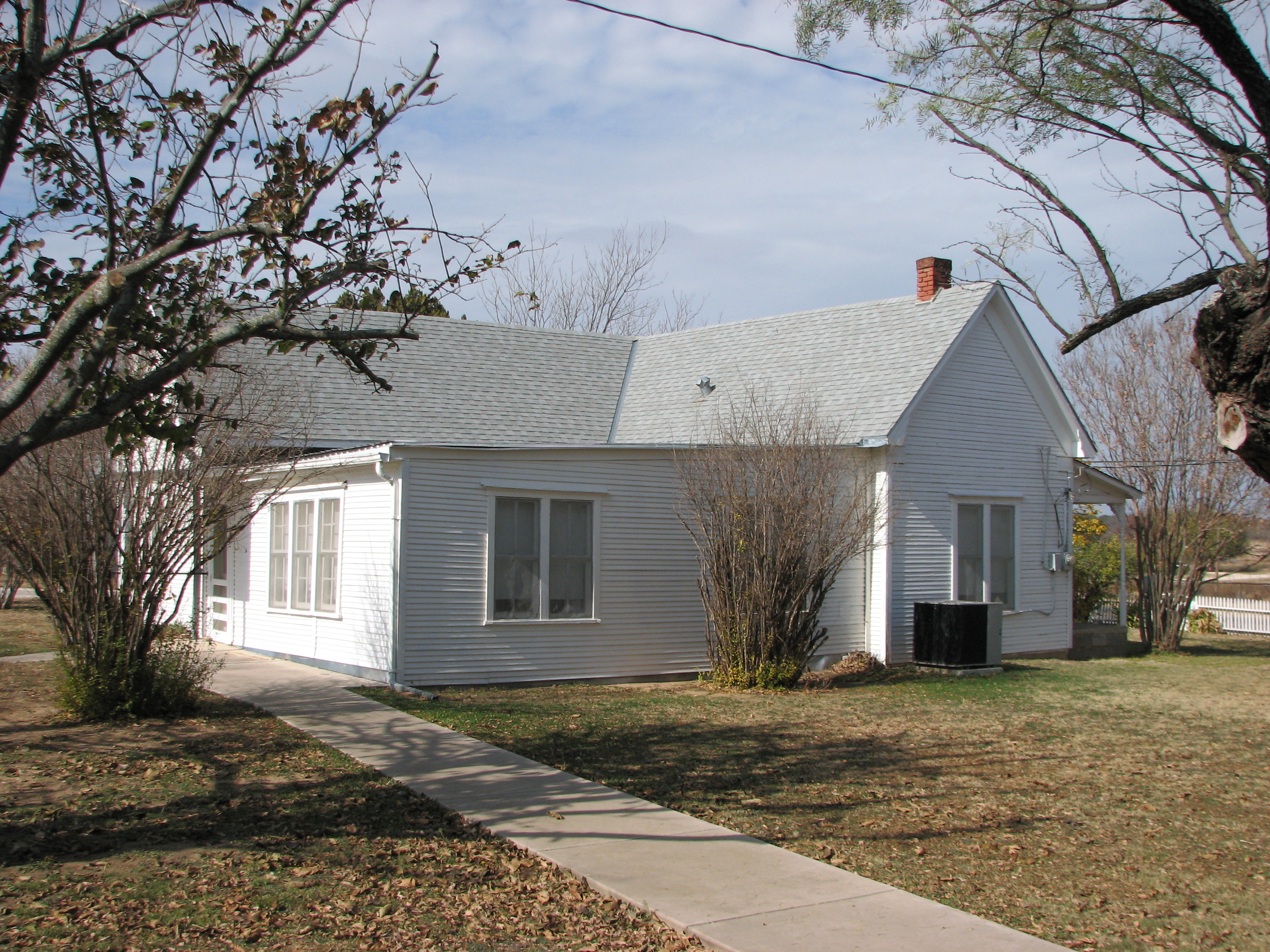
The Robert E. Howard Museum, former home of the author

The pulp fiction author Robert E. Howard, creator of the character Conan the Barbarian among others, lived in Cross Plains from the age of 13 in 1919 until his death in 1936. His former home in Cross Plains is now a museum. Every year, Cross Plains holds the Robert E. Howard Days and a Barbarian Festival on the second weekend of June.

== Major highways ==
- SH 36
- SH 206
- SH 279
- FM 374
- FM 880
