= Nolan, Texas =

Nolan
- Unincorporated community
- Location within the state of Texas Nolan (the United States)
- Coordinates: 32°16′25″N 100°14′33″W
- Country: United States
- State: Texas
- County: Nolan
- Elevation: 2,494 ft (760 m)
- Time zone: UTC-6 (Central (CST))
  - Summer (DST): UTC-5 (CDT)
- ZIP codes: 79537
- GNIS feature ID: 1342642

Nolan is an unincorporated community in southeastern Nolan County, Texas, United States. It lies along FM 126 southeast of the city of Sweetwater, the county seat of Nolan County. Although Nolan is unincorporated, it has a post office, with the ZIP code of 79537; the ZCTA for ZIP Code 79537 had a population of 94 at the 2000 census.

Nolan was founded in 1928 as a union of two communities: a previous Nolan (to the west), and Dora (to the east).
