= Coleman County, Texas =

County in Texas, United States

- County
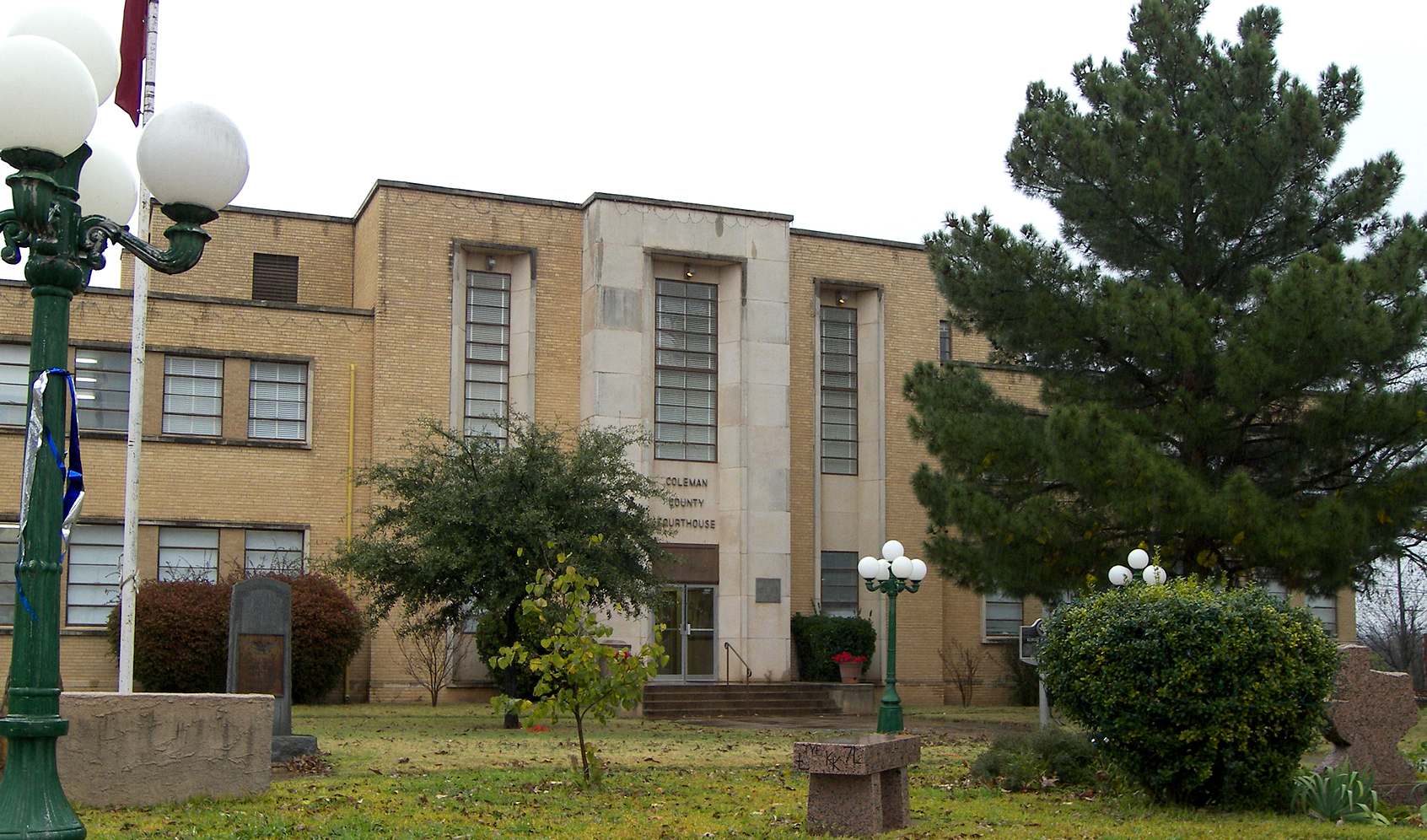
- The Coleman County Courthouse in Coleman

- Location within the U.S. state of Texas
- Coordinates: 31°46′N 99°27′W
- Country: United States
- State: Texas
- Founded: 1864
- Named for: Robert M. Coleman
- Seat: Coleman
- Largest city: Coleman

Area
  - Total: 1,281 sq mi (3,320 km^{2})
  - Land: 1,262 sq mi (3,270 km^{2})
  - Water: 19 sq mi (49 km^{2}) 1.5%

Population (2020)
  - Total: 7,684
  - Estimate (2025): 7,915 ▲
  - Density: 6.089/sq mi (2.351/km^{2})
- Time zone: UTC−6 (Central)
  - Summer (DST): UTC−5 (CDT)
- Congressional district: 11th
- Website: www.colemancounty.gov

Coleman County is a county located in the U.S. state of Texas. As of the 2020 census, its population was 7,684. The county seat is Coleman. The county was founded in 1858 and organized in 1864. It is named for Robert M. Coleman, a signer of the Texas Declaration of Independence and soldier at the Battle of San Jacinto.

== History ==
Around 10,000 BC, indigenous peoples of the Americas were the first inhabitants. Later inhabitants included the Jumano, Lipan Apache, and Comanche.

In 1632, Father Salas led an expedition to the upper Colorado River. In 1650, Captains Hernán Martín and Diego del Castillo explored the western portion of the county to the Concho River, and returned with pearls. Diego de Guadalajara followed the same path as Martín and Castillo in 1654. From 1683 to 1684, Juan Domínguez de Mendoza established a short-lived Quicuchabe mission.

In 1855, the county's oldest community, Trickham, was founded as a trading post for the ranching activities of John Chisum. Coleman County was formed from Brown and Travis Counties in 1858. The county is named for Robert M. Coleman, a signer of the Texas Declaration of Independence.

In 1861, Rich Coffey settled the communities of Leaday and Voss.

In 1876, the site was chosen for Coleman, the county seat.

The community of Santa Anna was established in 1879. It is named after the Santa Anna Mountains, which in turn, are named after Comanche Chief Santana.

In 1886, the Santa Fe Railway completed a spur to Coleman from nearby Coleman Junction (now San Angelo Junction).

In 1908, the county's first oil well came in near Trickham.

In 1914, the Santa Fe completed the Coleman Cutoff between Coleman, Lubbock, and Clovis. This linked its California lines with the Texas Gulf Coast and put Coleman on the road's main line. Coleman's distinctive brick-and-stucco Santa Fe depot was completed in 1915.

Oil was discovered north of Coleman on the J. P. Morris ranch in 1917.

The Coleman County Medical Center opened in 1923.

By 1925, tenant farmers comprised 63% of local agriculture.

In 1930, the Coleman County population peaked at 23,669.

The Coleman County oilfields produced over a million barrels in 1948.

In 2000, Wind Clean Corporation, harnessing energy from wind power, was founded.

== Geography ==
According to the U.S. Census Bureau, the county has a total area of 1,281 square miles (3,320 km^{2}), of which 1,262 square miles (3,270 km^{2}) are land and 19 square miles (49 km^{2}) (1.5%) are covered by water.

=== Major highways ===
- U.S. Highway 67
- U.S. Highway 84
- U.S. Highway 283
- State Highway 153
- State Highway 206

=== Adjacent counties ===
- Callahan County (north)
- Brown County (east)
- McCulloch County (south)
- Concho County (southwest)
- Runnels County (west)
- Taylor County (northwest)

== Demographics ==
Historical population
Census	Pop.	Note	%±
1870	347		—
1880	3,603		938.3%
1890	6,112		69.6%
1900	10,077		64.9%
1910	22,618		124.5%
1920	18,805		−16.9%
1930	23,669		25.9%
1940	20,571		−13.1%
1950	15,503		−24.6%
1960	12,458		−19.6%
1970	10,288		−17.4%
1980	10,439		1.5%
1990	9,710		−7.0%
2000	9,235		−4.9%
2010	8,895		−3.7%
2020	7,684		−13.6%
2025 (est.)	7,915	▲	3.0%
U.S. Decennial Census; 1850–2010 2010 2020

=== 2020 census ===
As of the 2020 census, the county had a population of 7,684, and the median age was 50.9 years; 19.8% of residents were under the age of 18 and 28.1% were 65 years of age or older. For every 100 females there were 97.3 males, and for every 100 females age 18 and over there were 96.0 males.

The racial makeup of the county was 85.7% White, 2.0% Black or African American, 0.8% American Indian and Alaska Native, 0.4% Asian, <0.1% Native Hawaiian and Pacific Islander, 4.3% from some other race, and 6.8% from two or more races. Hispanic or Latino residents of any race comprised 15.5% of the population.

46.8% of residents lived in urban areas, while 53.2% lived in rural areas.

There were 3,480 households in the county, of which 23.0% had children under the age of 18 living in them. Of all households, 46.3% were married-couple households, 21.4% were households with a male householder and no spouse or partner present, and 27.2% were households with a female householder and no spouse or partner present. About 34.3% of all households were made up of individuals and 18.2% had someone living alone who was 65 years of age or older.

There were 4,875 housing units, of which 28.6% were vacant. Among occupied housing units, 75.4% were owner-occupied and 24.6% were renter-occupied. The homeowner vacancy rate was 2.7% and the rental vacancy rate was 9.5%.

=== Racial and ethnic composition ===
Coleman County, Texas – Racial and ethnic composition Note: the US Census treats Hispanic/Latino as an ethnic category. This table excludes Latinos from the racial categories and assigns them to a separate category. Hispanics/Latinos may be of any race.
Race / Ethnicity (NH = Non-Hispanic)	Pop 1980	Pop 1990	Pop 2000	Pop 2010	Pop 2020	% 1980	% 1990	% 2000	% 2010	% 2020
White alone (NH)	9,065	8,288	7,599	7,123	6,013	86.84%	85.36%	82.28%	80.08%	78.25%
Black or African American alone (NH)	367	244	199	186	142	3.52%	2.51%	2.15%	2.09%	1.85%
Native American or Alaska Native alone (NH)	24	27	39	40	36	0.23%	0.28%	0.42%	0.45%	0.47%
Asian alone (NH)	24	7	20	32	32	0.23%	0.07%	0.22%	0.36%	0.42%
Native Hawaiian or Pacific Islander alone (NH)	x	x	0	1	0	x	x	0.00%	0.01%	0.00%
Other race alone (NH)	14	5	4	4	29	0.13%	0.05%	0.04%	0.04%	0.38%
Mixed race or Multiracial (NH)	x	x	85	90	240	x	x	0.92%	1.01%	3.12%
Hispanic or Latino (any race)	945	1,139	1,289	1,419	1,192	9.05%	11.73%	13.96%	15.95%	15.51%
Total	10,439	9,710	9,235	8,895	7,684	100.00%	100.00%	100.00%	100.00%	100.00%

=== 2000 census ===
As of the 2000 census, 9,235 people, 3,889 households, and 2,609 families resided in the county. The population density was 7 people per square mile (2.7 people/km^{2}). The 5,248 housing units averaged 4 units per square mile (1.5/km^{2}). The racial makeup of the county was 88.53% White, 2.19% African American, 0.62% Native American, 0.22% Asian, 0.01% Pacific Islander, 6.53% from other races, and 1.91% from two or more races. About 14% of the population was Hispanic or Latino of any race.

Of the 3,889 households, 27.20% had children under the age of 18 living with them, 53.80% were married couples living together, 9.30% had a female householder with no husband present, and 32.90% were not families; 30.20% of all households were made up of individuals, and 17.40% had someone living alone who was 65 years of age or older. The average household size was 2.33, and the average family size was 2.88.

In the county, the population was distributed as 23.60% under the age of 18, 6.60% from 18 to 24, 22.70% from 25 to 44, 24.00% from 45 to 64, and 23.00% who were 65 years of age or older. The median age was 43 years. For every 100 females, there were 92.20 males. For every 100 females age 18 and over, there were 88.10 males.

The median income for a household in the county was $25,658, and for a family was $31,168. Males had a median income of $25,993 versus $17,378 for females. The per capita income for the county was $14,911. About 15.50% of families and 19.90% of the population were below the poverty line, including 27.40% of those under age 18 and 14.90% of those age 65 or over.

== Education ==
These school districts serve Coleman County:

- Bangs ISD (mostly in Brown County)
- Coleman ISD
- Cross Plains ISD (mostly in Callahan County; small portions in Eastland and Brown Counties)
- Panther Creek Consolidated ISD (small portion in Runnels County)
- Santa Anna ISD

== Communities ==
=== Cities ===
- Coleman (county seat)
- Novice

=== Town ===
- Santa Anna

=== CDP ===
- Valera

=== Unincorporated communities ===
- Burkett
- Echo
- Fisk
- Glen Cove
- Goldsboro
- Gouldbusk
- Rockwood
- Silver Valley
- Talpa
- Trickham
- Voss
- Webbville
- Whon

=== Ghost towns ===
- Obregon
- San Angelo Junction
- Shields

== Politics ==
At the presidential level, Coleman County voted predominantly for the Democratic candidate from 1912 through 1948, with that tendency changing when native son Dwight D. Eisenhower ran successfully in 1952. Thenceforth, GOP candidates have carried the county in most campaigns, with increasingly wide margins in the 21st century.

United States presidential election results for Coleman County, Texas
Year	Republican		Democratic		Third party(ies)	
Year	No.	%	No.	%	No.	%
1912	52	3.72%	1,280	91.56%	66	4.72%
1916	96	4.85%	1,700	85.86%	184	9.29%
1920	355	16.03%	1,445	65.27%	414	18.70%
1924	502	15.03%	2,763	82.70%	76	2.27%
1928	1,645	53.00%	1,459	47.00%	0	0.00%
1932	235	7.51%	2,881	92.10%	12	0.38%
1936	269	8.47%	2,900	91.28%	8	0.25%
1940	454	12.19%	3,257	87.48%	12	0.32%
1944	498	13.44%	2,887	77.94%	319	8.61%
1948	545	15.89%	2,695	78.59%	189	5.51%
1952	2,555	58.24%	1,824	41.58%	8	0.18%
1956	2,247	58.50%	1,577	41.06%	17	0.44%
1960	2,127	53.48%	1,835	46.14%	15	0.38%
1964	1,434	34.93%	2,670	65.04%	1	0.02%
1968	1,507	36.68%	1,449	35.26%	1,153	28.06%
1972	2,386	76.67%	721	23.17%	5	0.16%
1976	1,669	42.20%	2,264	57.24%	22	0.56%
1980	2,228	55.78%	1,719	43.04%	47	1.18%
1984	2,790	66.16%	1,420	33.67%	7	0.17%
1988	2,340	54.15%	1,978	45.78%	3	0.07%
1992	1,462	35.33%	1,579	38.16%	1,097	26.51%
1996	1,793	49.19%	1,488	40.82%	364	9.99%
2000	2,687	75.10%	853	23.84%	38	1.06%
2004	3,035	79.33%	778	20.33%	13	0.34%
2008	3,011	81.33%	643	17.37%	48	1.30%
2012	3,012	86.25%	442	12.66%	38	1.09%
2016	3,177	87.21%	388	10.65%	78	2.14%
2020	3,641	88.18%	451	10.92%	37	0.90%
2024	3,712	89.32%	428	10.30%	16	0.38%

United States Senate election results for Coleman County, Texas1
Year	Republican		Democratic		Third party(ies)	
Year	No.	%	No.	%	No.	%
2024	3,585	86.97%	470	11.40%	67	1.63%

United States Senate election results for Coleman County, Texas2
Year	Republican		Democratic		Third party(ies)	
Year	No.	%	No.	%	No.	%
2020	3,586	88.22%	426	10.48%	53	1.30%

Texas Gubernatorial election results for Coleman County
Year	Republican		Democratic		Third party(ies)	
Year	No.	%	No.	%	No.	%
2022	2,942	90.83%	269	8.31%	28	0.86%

== See also ==
- National Register of Historic Places listings in Coleman County, Texas
- Recorded Texas Historic Landmarks in Coleman County
