= Cross Plains Independent School District =

School district in Texas

Cross Plains Independent School District is a public school district based in Cross Plains, Texas (USA). Located in Callahan County, portions of the district extend into Eastland, Brown, and Coleman counties. In 2009, the school district was rated "recognized" by the Texas Education Agency.

Cross Plains ISD has two campuses -

- Cross Plains High School (Grades 7–12)
- Cross Plains Elementary (Grades PK-6)
