= Valera, Texas =

Unincorporated community in Texas, US

Coordinates: 31°45′11″N 99°32′55″W

Valera
- Unincorporated community Census designated place
- Interactive map of Valera
- Country: United States of America
- State: Texas
- County: Coleman

Population
  - Total: 94

Valera is an unincorporated community and census-designated place (CDP) in Coleman County, Texas, United States. As of the 2020 census, Valera had a population of 94.

== Education ==
The Panther Creek Consolidated Independent School District serves area students, and is about 8 miles south on FM 503. As of 2020, it had a population of 177 in 72 households.

== Demographics ==
Historical population
| Census | Pop. | Note | %± |
|---|---|---|---|
| 2020 | 94 | | — |
U.S. Decennial Census; 1850–1900 1910; 1920 1930 1940; 1950 1960 1970; 1980 1990 2000; 2010 2020

Valera first appeared as a census-designated place in the 2020 U.S. census.

=== 2020 census ===
Valera CDP, Texas – Racial and ethnic composition Note: the US Census treats Hispanic/Latino as an ethnic category. This table excludes Latinos from the racial categories and assigns them to a separate category. Hispanics/Latinos may be of any race.
| Race / Ethnicity (NH = Non-Hispanic) | Pop 2020 | % 2020 |
|---|---|---|
| White alone (NH) | 61 | 64.89% |
| Black or African American alone (NH) | 0 | 0.00% |
| Native American or Alaska Native alone (NH) | 2 | 2.13% |
| Asian alone (NH) | 1 | 1.06% |
| Native Hawaiian or Pacific Islander alone (NH) | 0 | 0.00% |
| Other race alone (NH) | 1 | 1.06% |
| Multiracial (NH) | 2 | 2.13% |
| Hispanic or Latino (any race) | 27 | 28.72% |
| Total | 94 | 100.00% |

As of the 2020 United States census, 94 people, 30 households, and 30 families resided in the CDP.
