= Area code 325 =

Area code in west-central Texas, United States

Numbering plan areas and area codes of Texas with numbering plan area 325 highlighted.

North American area code 325 is a state of Texas area code for telephone numbers in the Abilene and San Angelo areas. It was created, along with area code 432, on April 5, 2003, in a split from area code 915.

Counties served by this area code:

- Brown
- Callahan
- Coke
- Coleman
- Comanche
- Concho
- Crockett
- Fisher
- Irion
- Jones
- Kimble
- Llano
- Mason
- McCulloch
- Menard
- Mills
- Mitchell
- Nolan
- Reagan
- Runnels
- San Saba
- Schleicher
- Scurry
- Shackelford
- Sterling
- Sutton
- Tom Green
- Taylor

Cities and towns served by this area code:

- Abilene
- Albany
- Anson
- Avoca
- Baird
- Ballinger
- Bangs
- Barnhart
- Big Lake
- Blackwell
- Blanket
- Brady
- Bronte
- Brookesmith
- Brownwood
- Buffalo Gap
- Burkett
- Carlsbad
- Cherokee
- Christoval
- Clyde
- Coleman
- Colorado City
- Comanche
- Doole
- Dyess Air Force Base
- Early
- Eden
- Eldorado
- Eola
- Fredonia
- Goldsboro
- Goldthwaite
- Goodfellow Air Force Base
- Gouldbusk
- Gustine
- Hamlin
- Hawley
- Hermleigh
- Ira
- Junction
- Kingsland
- Lawn
- Llano
- Lohn
- London
- Loraine
- Lueders
- Maryneal
- Mason
- McCaulley
- Melvin
- Menard
- Mereta
- Merkel
- Mertzon
- Miles
- Millersview
- Moran
- Mullin
- Nolan
- Norton
- Ovalo
- Ozona
- Paint Rock
- Pontotoc
- Priddy
- Putnam
- Richland Springs
- Robert Lee
- Roby
- Rochelle
- Rockwood
- Roosevelt
- Roscoe
- Rotan
- Rowena
- San Angelo
- San Saba
- Santa Anna
- Snyder
- Sonora
- Stamford
- Sterling City
- Sweetwater
- Sylvester
- Tennyson
- Tow
- Trent
- Tuscola
- Tye
- Valera
- Veribest
- Voca
- Wall
- Water Valley
- Westbrook
- Wingate
- Winters
- Zephyr

== See also ==
- List of Texas area codes

Texas area codes: 210/726, 214/469/972/945, 254, 325, 361, 409, 432, 512/737, 713/281/832/346, 806, 817/682, 830, 903/430, 915, 936, 940, 956, 979
	North: 806, 940	
West: 432	area code 325	East: 254, 512/737
	South: 830	
