= Santa Anna Independent School District =

School district in Texas

Coordinates: 31°44′13.1″N 99°19′24.4″W

Santa Anna Independent School District is a public school district based in Santa Anna, Texas.

The district has two campuses – Santa Anna Secondary (Grades 7–12) and Santa Anna Elementary (Grades PK–6).

== Academic achievement ==
In 2009, the school district was rated "academically acceptable" by the Texas Education Agency.

== Athletics ==
Santa Anna High School plays six-man football.

== Controversy ==
In July 2024, the ACLU of Texas sent Santa Anna Independent School District a letter, alleging that the district's 2023-2024 dress and grooming code appeared to violate the Texas CROWN Act, a state law which prohibits racial discrimination based on hair texture or styles, and asking the district to revise its policies for the 2024-2025 school year.

== See also ==
- List of school districts in Texas
