= Panther Creek Consolidated Independent School District =

School district in Texas

Coordinates: 31.6379°N 99.5530°W

Panther Creek Consolidated Independent School District is a public school district based in the community of Valera, Texas, United States. Located in Coleman County, a small portion of the district extends into Runnels County, and covers over 500 sq mi (1,300 km^{2}). It also serves Talpa.

The district was created on July 1, 1986, by the consolidation of the Mozelle and Talpa Centennial districts. The Texas Education Agency (TEA) recorded it as the Talpa Centennial district consolidating into Mozelle.

In 2009, the school district was rated "recognized" by the TEA.

== Schools ==
- Panther Creek High School (grades 6-12)
- Panther Creek Elementary School (prekindergarten-grade 5)

== Special programs ==
=== Athletics ===
Panther Creek High School plays six-man football.

== See also ==
- List of school districts in Texas
