= Coleman, Texas =

- City
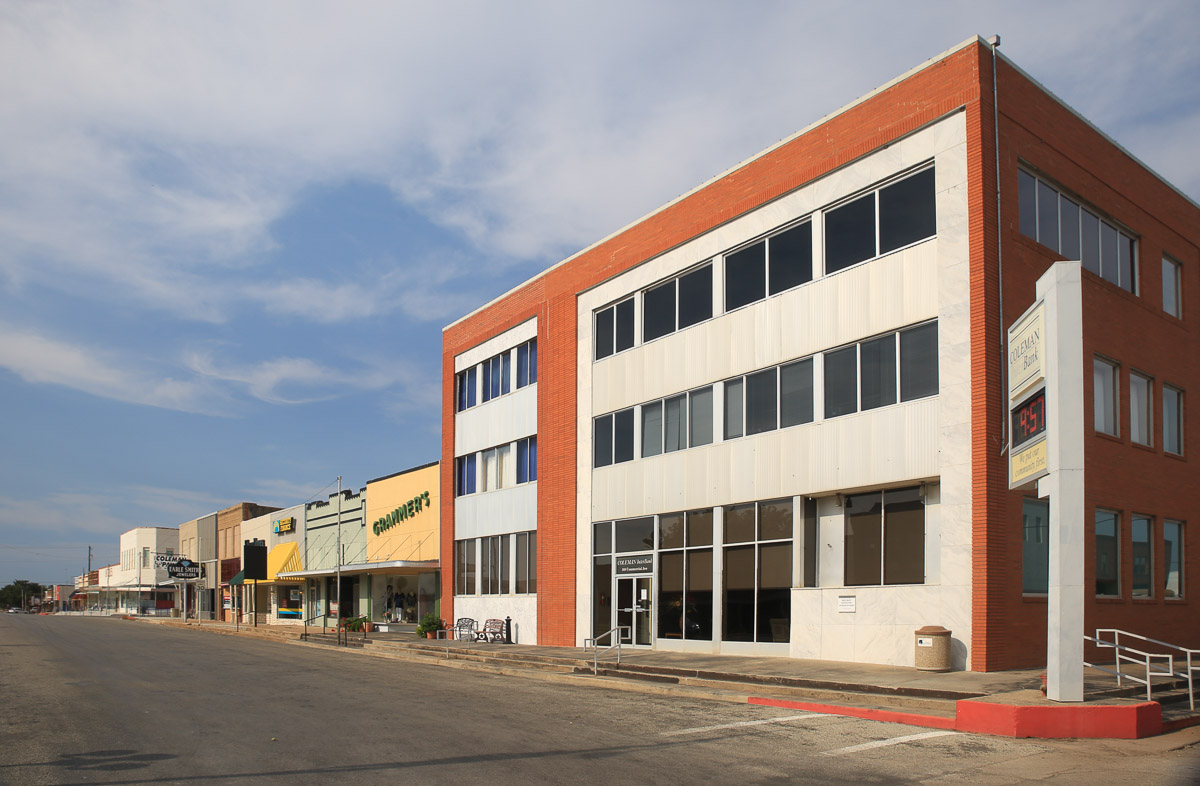
- Motto: "The Friendliest Town in Texas"
- Location of Coleman, Texas
- Coordinates: 31°49′40″N 99°25′32″W
- Country: United States
- State: Texas
- County: Coleman

Area
  - Total: 6.18 sq mi (16.00 km^{2})
  - Land: 6.14 sq mi (15.91 km^{2})
  - Water: 0.035 sq mi (0.09 km^{2})
- Elevation: 1,696 ft (517 m)

Population (2020)
  - Total: 3,912
  - Density: 636.8/sq mi (245.9/km^{2})
- Time zone: UTC-6 (Central (CST))
  - Summer (DST): UTC-5 (CDT)
- ZIP code: 76834
- Area code: 325
- FIPS code: 48-15916
- GNIS feature ID: 2410189
- Website: www.cityofcolemantx.us

Coleman is a town in and the county seat of Coleman County, Texas, United States. As of the 2020 census, its population was 3,912.

== History ==
Coleman was founded in 1876 when R. J. Clow donated a 160-acre site on Hords Creek for a county seat. The town was named after the county. Coleman boomed as a result of its location on the Western Trail. In 1886, the Santa Fe Railroad built a spur line to the town.

== Geography ==
Coleman is located north of the center of Coleman County at 31°49′40″N 99°25′32″W (31.827694, −99.425689). U.S. Routes 84 and 283 pass through the northeastern side of the city. US 84 leads northwest 52 miles (84 km) to Abilene and southeast 30 miles (48 km) to Brownwood, while US 283 leads north 41 miles (66 km) to Baird and south 52 miles (84 km) to Brady.

Coleman has five multipurpose recreational lakes within 30 miles.

According to the United States Census Bureau, Coleman has a total area of 3,950 acres (1,600 ha), of which 20 acres (10 ha) (0.58%) is covered by water.

== Demographics ==
Historical population
Census	Pop.	Note	%±
1890	906		—
1900	1,362		50.3%
1910	3,046		123.6%
1920	2,868		−5.8%
1930	6,078		111.9%
1940	6,054		−0.4%
1950	6,530		7.9%
1960	6,371		−2.4%
1970	5,608		−12.0%
1980	5,960		6.3%
1990	5,410		−9.2%
2000	5,127		−5.2%
2010	4,709		−8.2%
2020	3,912		−16.9%
U.S. Decennial Census

=== 2020 census ===
As of the 2020 census, there were 3,912 people, 1,759 households, and 1,051 families residing in the city.

The median age was 46.9 years, with 21.9% of residents under the age of 18 and 25.3% of residents 65 years of age or older. For every 100 females there were 91.1 males, and for every 100 females age 18 and over there were 89.0 males.

92.0% of residents lived in urban areas, while 8.0% lived in rural areas.

Of the 1,759 households in Coleman, 23.7% had children under the age of 18 living in them. Of all households, 39.9% were married-couple households, 21.9% were households with a male householder and no spouse or partner present, and 32.1% were households with a female householder and no spouse or partner present. About 36.6% of all households were made up of individuals and 19.3% had someone living alone who was 65 years of age or older.

There were 2,310 housing units, of which 23.9% were vacant. Among occupied housing units, 68.9% were owner-occupied and 31.1% were renter-occupied. The homeowner vacancy rate was 3.6% and the rental vacancy rate was 11.8%.

Racial composition as of the 2020 census
Race	Number	Percent
White	3,278	83.8%
Black or African American	95	2.4%
American Indian and Alaska Native	36	0.9%
Asian	17	0.4%
Native Hawaiian and Other Pacific Islander	0	0%
Some other race	211	5.4%
Two or more races	275	7.0%
Hispanic or Latino (of any race)	760	19.4%

=== 2000 census ===
At the census of 2000, 5,127 people, 2,179 households, and 1,403 families resided in the city. The population density was 831.9 inhabitants per square mile (321.2/km^{2}). The 2,658 housing units averaged 431.3/sq mi (166.6/km^{2}). The racial makeup of the city was 85.04% White, 2.95% African American, 0.66% Native American, 0.23% Asian, 8.89% from other races, and 2.22% from two or more races. Hispanics or Latinos of any race were 16.93% of the population.

Of the 2,179 households, 28.8% had children under the age of 18 living with them, 48.3% were married couples living together, 11.6% had a female householder with no husband present, and 35.6% were not families. About 32.5% of all households were made up of individuals, and 19.3% had someone living alone who was 65 years of age or older. The average household size was 2.33 and the average family size was 2.93.

In the city, the population was distributed as 25.0% under the age of 18, 7.7% from 18 to 24, 23.1% from 25 to 44, 21.7% from 45 to 64, and 22.5% who were 65 years of age or older. The median age was 40 years. For every 100 females, there were 87.2 males. For every 100 females age 18 and over, there were 82.1 males.

The median income for a household in the city was $22,769, and for a family was $28,356. Males had a median income of $24,226 versus $15,526 for females. The per capita income for the city was $13,752. About 19.3% of families and 24.0% of the population were below the poverty line, including 34.4% of those under age 18 and 14.6% of those age 65 or over, median age 42.6 yrs.

== Education ==
The city is served by the Coleman Independent School District, which has about 1,000 students. During the 2006–2007 academic year, 475 students were in elementary schools, 203 were in junior high, and 274 were in high school.

== Notable people ==
- Keith Allison Session musician and a member of Paul Revere and The Raiders
- Ronnie Dunn of the country group Brooks & Dunn, was born in Coleman in 1953
- Tom Jones, co-writer of The Fantasticks, went to high school in Coleman
- Carobeth Laird, ethnologist, was born in Coleman

== Camp Colorado ==
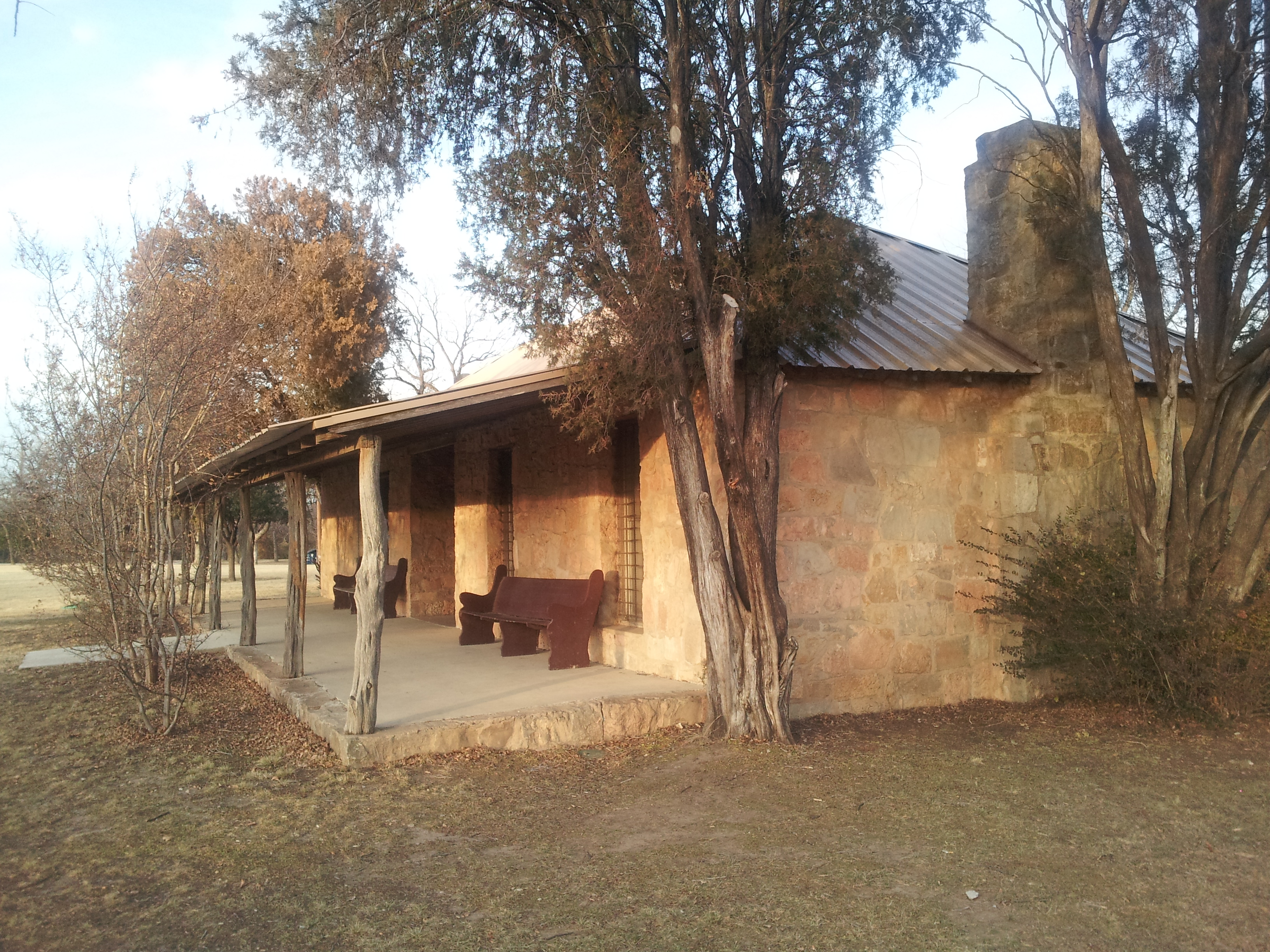
Camp Colorado replica administration building

Camp Colorado was established in 1855 and abandoned in 1861. The camp then became headquarters for the Texas Mounted Rifles in 1861 and the Texas Frontier Regiment in 1863.

== Climate ==
The climate in this area is characterized by hot, humid summers and generally mild to cool winters. According to the Köppen climate classification system, Coleman has a humid subtropical climate, Cfa on climate maps.

Climate data for Coleman, Texas (1991–2020 normals, extremes 1897–present)
Month	Jan	Feb	Mar	Apr	May	Jun	Jul	Aug	Sep	Oct	Nov	Dec	Year
Record high °F (°C)	90 (32)	99 (37)	100 (38)	104 (40)	110 (43)	110 (43)	113 (45)	114 (46)	111 (44)	104 (40)	96 (36)	93 (34)	114 (46)
Mean daily maximum °F (°C)	59.4 (15.2)	63.9 (17.7)	71.2 (21.8)	79.8 (26.6)	86.3 (30.2)	92.9 (33.8)	96.7 (35.9)	96.7 (35.9)	89.4 (31.9)	80.3 (26.8)	68.9 (20.5)	60.5 (15.8)	78.8 (26.0)
Daily mean °F (°C)	47.1 (8.4)	51.0 (10.6)	58.1 (14.5)	66.3 (19.1)	74.1 (23.4)	81.1 (27.3)	84.4 (29.1)	84.1 (28.9)	77.3 (25.2)	67.4 (19.7)	56.5 (13.6)	48.6 (9.2)	66.3 (19.1)
Mean daily minimum °F (°C)	34.7 (1.5)	38.0 (3.3)	45.0 (7.2)	52.7 (11.5)	61.9 (16.6)	69.2 (20.7)	72.1 (22.3)	71.5 (21.9)	65.1 (18.4)	54.5 (12.5)	44.1 (6.7)	36.6 (2.6)	53.8 (12.1)
Record low °F (°C)	−5 (−21)	−1 (−18)	9 (−13)	25 (−4)	36 (2)	41 (5)	54 (12)	50 (10)	36 (2)	22 (−6)	11 (−12)	−4 (−20)	−5 (−21)
Average precipitation inches (mm)	1.31 (33)	1.87 (47)	2.17 (55)	1.96 (50)	3.68 (93)	3.65 (93)	2.09 (53)	2.53 (64)	2.46 (62)	2.69 (68)	2.09 (53)	1.38 (35)	27.88 (708)
Average snowfall inches (cm)	0.4 (1.0)	0.6 (1.5)	0.0 (0.0)	0.1 (0.25)	0.0 (0.0)	0.0 (0.0)	0.0 (0.0)	0.0 (0.0)	0.0 (0.0)	0.0 (0.0)	0.1 (0.25)	0.3 (0.76)	1.5 (3.8)
Average precipitation days (≥ 0.01 in)	4.8	4.9	5.8	4.6	6.8	6.2	4.1	5.0	5.1	5.7	4.4	4.4	61.8
Average snowy days (≥ 0.1 in)	0.4	0.6	0.0	0.0	0.0	0.0	0.0	0.0	0.0	0.0	0.2	0.3	1.5
Source: NOAA

== Paradox ==
The town is the setting for the exposition of a published example of the Abilene paradox, wherein family members agree to take an impromptu trip to Abilene for dinner when in fact none of them really want to do so.
