= Initiate =

Initiate may refer to:

- The Initiate, a 1920 series of three occult books by Cyril Scott
- "The Initiate", a short story set in the Divergent trilogy by Veronica Roth collected in Four: A Divergent Collection
- The Initiate, a novel in The Time Master Trilogy by Louise Cooper, 1985
- The Initiate, a drama by Alexandra Wood, 2014
- Initiate (Nels Cline Singers album), 2010
- Initiate (Mervyn Spence album), 1995

== See also ==
- Initiation (disambiguation)
- Initiator (disambiguation)
- Neophyte (disambiguation)
- Novice (disambiguation)
