= Wishbone-C =

Aspect of sports logo design

The wishbone-C is the colloquial name for a distinctive form of the letter C used primarily as a logo by sports teams. It has been described as "a standard letter 'C' that is pinched off in the middle to make it look like a sideways wishbone."

== History and past usage ==
Historic Uses

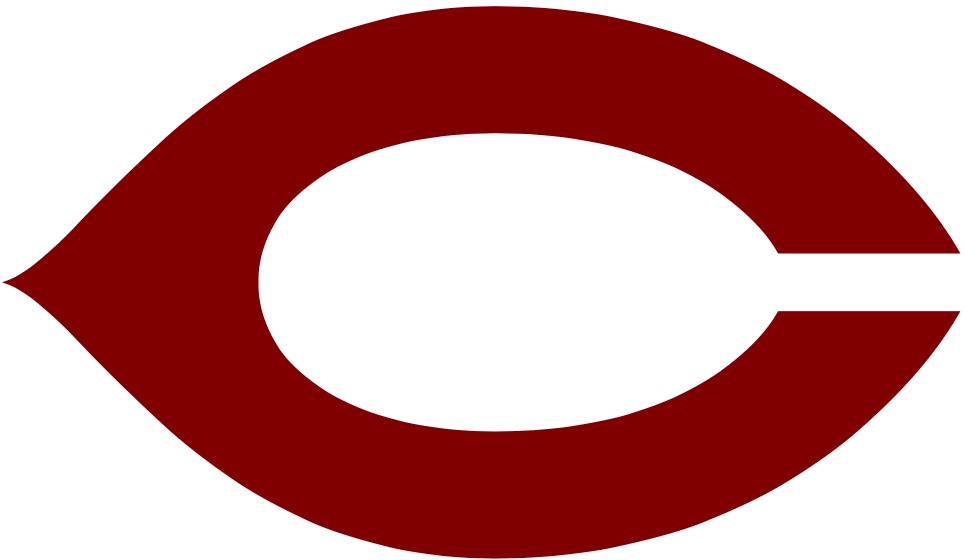
Chicago Maroons logo from 1898 to 2016.

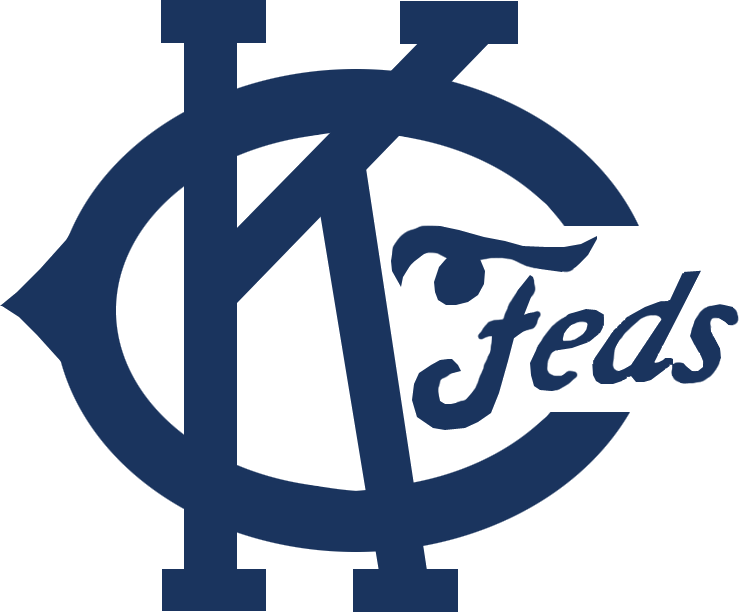
Kansas City Packers logo from 1914 to 1915.

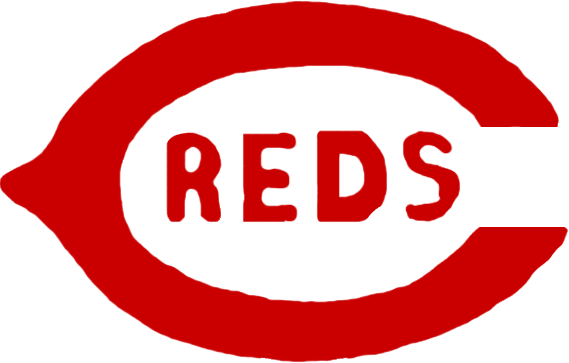
Cincinnati Reds logo from 1915 to 1919.

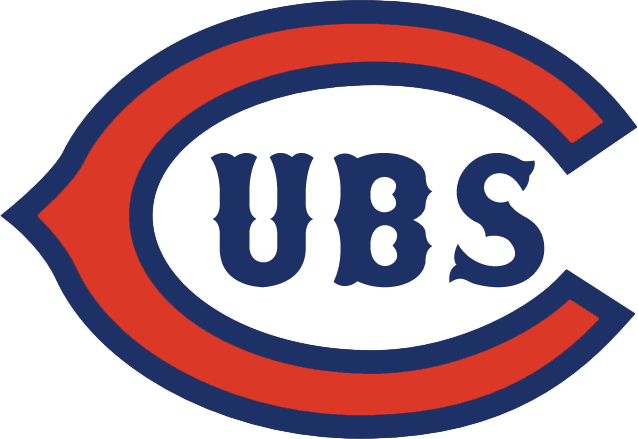
Chicago Cubs logo from 1919 to 1926.

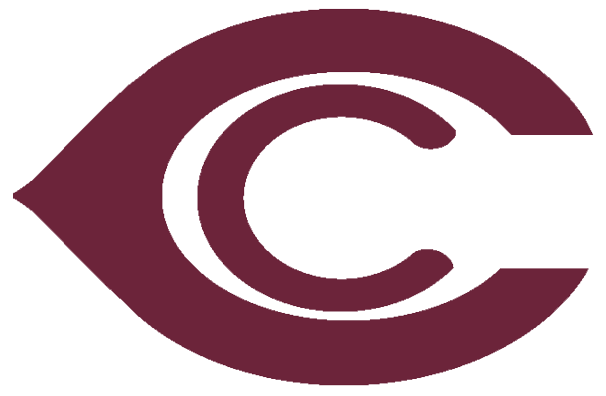
Chicago Cardinals logo from 1922 to 1959.

The wishbone-C was used as early as 1898 by the University of Chicago football team. The wishbone-C was adopted by the Cincinnati Reds of Major League Baseball as early as 1905, and they have worn on their uniforms it in some form or fashion every season since 1909. The Chicago Bears of the National Football League have utilized the wishbone-C as their logo on their helmets since 1962.

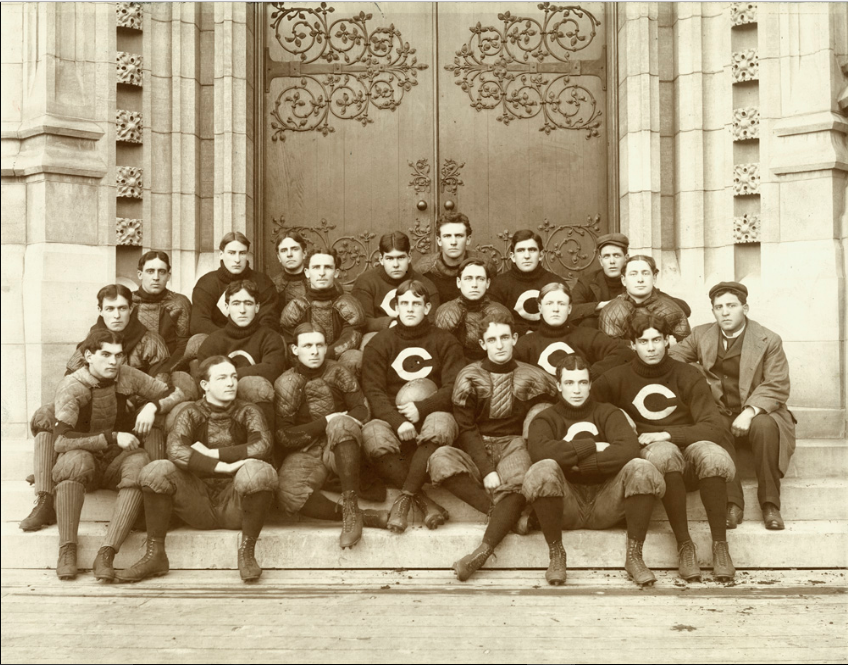
The wishbone-C on the uniforms of the 1898 University of Chicago Maroons football team

The Chicago Cardinals, ancestors of the Arizona Cardinals, also used a wishbone-C logo. The wishbone-C has also been used by the Chicago Cubs, Cleveland Indians, and in part of the logo of the Minnesota Twins. In the Negro Leagues, the wishbone-C was worn by the Kansas City Monarchs and the Cincinnati Tigers. It was also used by the Kansas City Packers of the Federal League.

On the college level, the wishbone-C was worn by:

- Catawba College in North Carolina
- Central College in Iowa
- Colby College in Maine
- Creighton University in Nebraska (1968-mid 70s)
- University of Central Missouri
- Texas A&M University–Commerce (1996-2007 Alt. logo)

== Current usage ==
=== United States ===
On the American Professional Sports level, the wishbone-C is currently worn by:

Chicago Bears logo.

- Chicago Bears

Cincinnati Reds logo.

- Cincinnati Reds
- Kansas City Monarchs (American Association)
- Minnesota Twins

On the college level, the wishbone-C is currently worn by:

- University of Chicago
- Chapman University in California
- Concordia College in Minnesota
- University of California, Davis

At least 25 high schools in the United States currently use the wishbone-C:

- California
  - Carlsbad High School
  - Clovis High School
- Florida

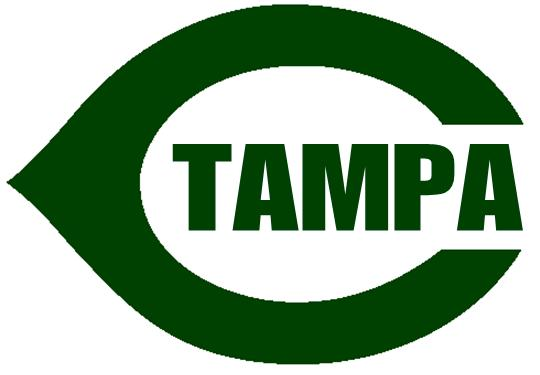
Tampa Catholic's logo. (FL.)

  - Tampa Catholic High School
- Idaho
  - Columbia High School
- Indiana
  - Tri-County Senior High School
  - Castle High School
- Illinois
  - Curie Metropolitan High School
  - Champaign Central High School
- Iowa
  - Chanute High School
- Kansas
  - Carroll High School
- Massachusetts
  - Chicopee High School
- Mississippi

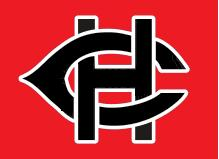
Harrison Central's logo. (MS.)

  - Columbia High School
  - Harrison Central High School
  - Tri-County Academy
- Nebraska

Creighton Prep's logo. (NE.)

  - Columbus High School
  - Creighton Preparatory School
- New Jersey
  - Chatham High School
- New Mexico
  - Carlsbad High School
  - Capital High School
- New Hampshire
  - Concord High School
- North Carolina
  - Cape Hatteras Secondary School
  - Granville Central High School
- Texas
  - Cleburne High
  - Clements High
  - Coleman High School
  - Connally High
  - Conroe High
  - Crandall High School

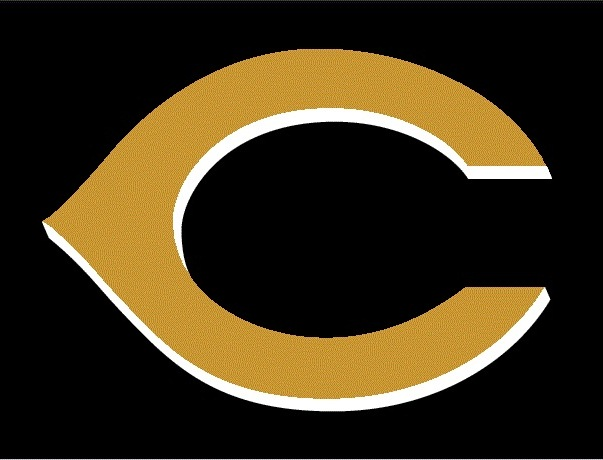
Crawford's logo. (TX.)

  - Crawford High School
- Virginia
  - Cumberland High School
- Washington
  - Camas High School

=== Japan ===
In Japan, the wishbone-C is used by:

- Hiroshima Toyo Carp
- Chuo University
