= Initiation (disambiguation) =

Initiation is a rite of passage marking entrance or acceptance into a group or society.

== Anthropology ==
- Bora (Australian), both an initiation ceremony of Indigenous Australians, and the site on which the initiation is performed
- Buddhist initiation ritual, the public ordination ceremony wherein a lay student of Buddhism receives certain Buddhist precepts
- Hazing, refers to the practice of rituals, challenges, and other activities involving harassment, abuse or humiliation used as a way of initiating a person into a group including a new fraternity, sorority, team, or club
- Initiation (guru), a diksha, or giving of a mantra or an initiation by the guru in Indian religions
- Initiation ritual (mafia), a ceremony involving significant ritual, oaths, blood, and an agreement
- Masonic initiation rituals, part of the Masonic ritual and symbolism
- Ndut initiation rite, a rite of passage as well as a religious education commanded by Serer religion
- Rite of Christian Initiation of Adults, a process developed by the Catholic Church for prospective converts to Catholicism who are above the age of infant baptism
- Sacraments of initiation, three rites that introduce a person into the Christian Church

== Arts, entertainment, and media ==
=== Films ===
- The Initiation (film), a 1984 American slasher film directed by Larry Stewart
- Initiation (1987 film), an Australian adventure drama thriller film
- Initiation (2020 film), an American horror film

=== Literature ===
- The Initiation (novel), a young adult novel by L. J. Smith
- Initiation, a book by Elisabeth Haich

=== Music ===
- Initiation (Todd Rundgren album), 1975
- Initiation (Tommy Emmanuel album), 1995, or the title song
- Initiation (Course of Empire album), 1994
- Initiation (TheStart album), 2004
- The Initiation (album), a 2001 album by X-Raided
- Initiation (Sumo Cyco album), 2021
- "Initiation", a song from AFI's album The Art of Drowning
- "Initiation", a song from The Weeknd's mixtape Echoes of Silence
- "The Initiation", track by Jesper Kyd from the 2018 Indian film Tumbbad

=== Television ===
- "Initiation" (The Office), an episode
- Initiation (Justice League Unlimited), an episode
- Initiation (Kung Fu: The Legend Continues), the pilot episode
- "Initiations" (Star Trek: Voyager), an episode of Star Trek: Voyager
- "The Initiation", an episode of Alfred Hitchcock Presents (1987)
- "The Initiation", an episode of Bonanza (1972)
- "The Initiation", an episode of Southie Rules (2013)
- "The Initiation", an episode of The Adventures of Ozzie and Harriet (1954)
- "The Initiation", an episode of Margie (1961)
- "The Initiation", an episode of Joe's World (1979)
- "The Initiation", an episode of The Young Riders (1991)
- "The Initiation", an episode of Mr. Belvedere (1987)
- "The Initiation", an episode of It's About Time (1966)
- "The Initiation", an episode of The Lost World (2002)
- "The Initiation", an episode of First Night (1963)
- "The Initiation", an episode of The Edison Twins (1986)
- "The Initiation", an episode of Honey Lane (1967)
- "The Initiation", an episode of Stingers (1998)
- "The Initiation", an episode of Look Up and Live (1965)
- "The Initiation", an episode of The FBI Files (2003)
- "The Initiation", an episode of The Molly Wopsies (1976)

== Chemistry and medicine ==
- Initiation (chemistry), a chemical reaction that triggers one or more secondary reactions
- Initiation, the process of beginning gene transcription
- Initiation as beginning of gene translation
  - Initiation factor, proteins that bind to the small subunit of the ribosome during the initiation of translation
  - Prokaryotic initiation factors, IF1, IF2, and IF3
  - Abortive initiation, an early process of genetic transcription
- Chain initiation, the beginning of chain-growth polymerization
- Tumor initiation, the first phase in tumor development
- Initiation (phonetics), the production of airflow by the airstream mechanism in the vocal tract

== Technology ==
- Session Initiation Protocol, a telecommunications protocol for signaling and controlling multimedia communication sessions
- Project Initiation Documentation, information which was acquired through the Starting up a Project and Initiating a Project in a PRINCE2 controlled project environment

== See also ==
- Initiate (disambiguation)
- Initiator (disambiguation)
