= Novice (disambiguation) =

A novice is an inexperienced person or creature. It may also refer to:

== Geography ==
- Novice, Texas, a small community
- Novice Independent School District, Texas
- Novice Gail Fawcett (1909–1998), eighth president of Ohio State University

== Books ==
- The Novice (poem), an 1840 poem by Mikhail Lermontov
- Novice, Kmetijske in rokodelske novice ("Agricultural and Artisan News") Slovene newspaper from the 19th century
- The Novice (novel), a fantasy novel by Taran Matharu.

== Music ==
- "Le Novice", art song by Edouard Lalo (1823–92)
- Novice (album), a 1989 album by French rocker Alain Bashung

== Other ==
- Novice (racehorse), a class of horse in National Hunt racing
- The Novice, a 2006 film starring Alan Arkin and Jacob Pitts
- The Novice, a 2021 film starring Isabelle Fuhrman
- Novice, a French naval rank
- Novice, Amauris ochlea, a butterfly of southern and southeastern Africa

== See also ==
- Novuss, a game of physical skill
