= Neophyte =

A neophyte is a recent initiate or convert to a subject or belief.

Neophyte may also refer to:

== Science ==
- Neophyte (botany), a plant species recently introduced to an area

== As a proper noun ==
=== Arts and entertainment ===
- Neophyte, a character class in the online role playing game Secret of the Solstice
- Neophyte (band), a Dutch group that produces gabber/hardcore music
- "Neophyte", a 2023 song by the Smashing Pumpkins from Atum: A Rock Opera in Three Acts
- Neophyte (comics), a character from Marvel Comics
- Neophyte, a recent initiate of a Space Marine Chapter in Warhammer 40,000, see Space Marine (Warhammer 40,000)
- Neophyte Redglare, a character in Homestuck

=== Other ===
- Neófito (Neophyte), a Native American baptized under the Spanish missions of California
- Neophyte, in the grade of 1°=10□ in A∴A∴, has to acquire perfect control of the astral plane
- Neophyte (HBC vessel), operated by the HBC from 1946–1947, see Hudson's Bay Company vessels

== See also ==
- Neofit (disambiguation)
- Neophytus (disambiguation)
- Newcomer (disambiguation)
- Novice (disambiguation)
