= Logos and uniforms of the Chicago Bears =

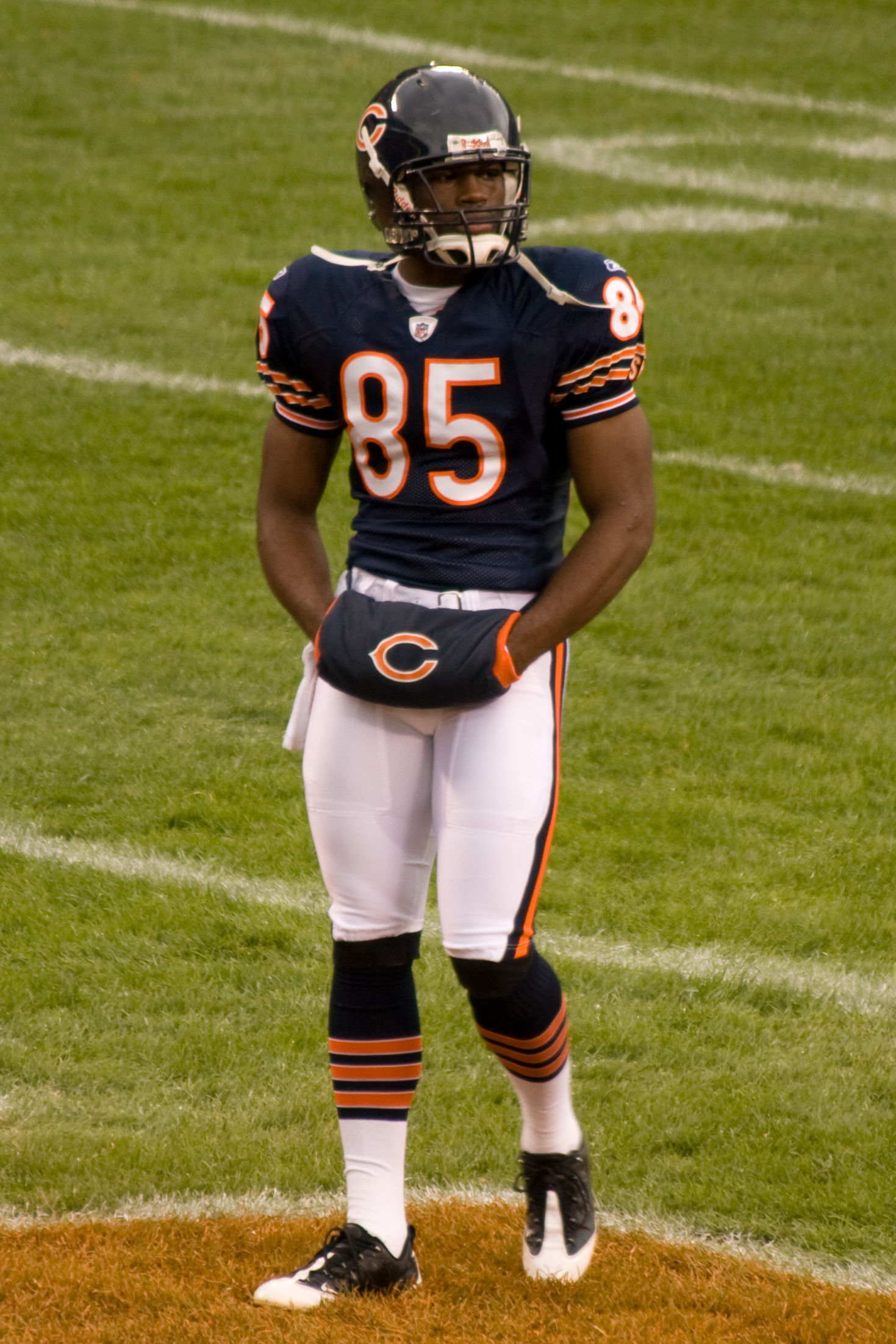
Earl Bennett in the current home uniform.

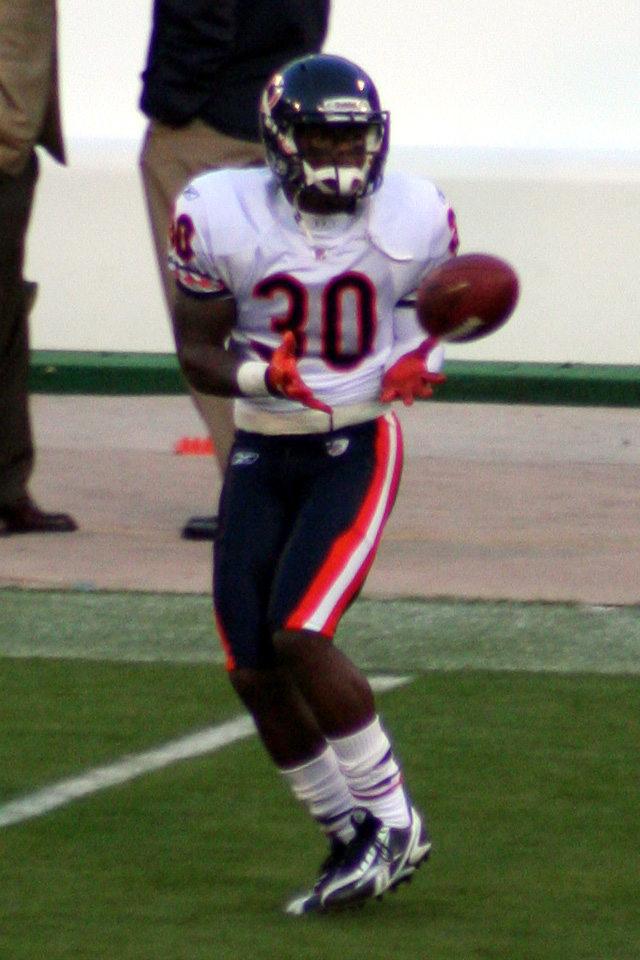
D. J. Moore in the current away uniform.

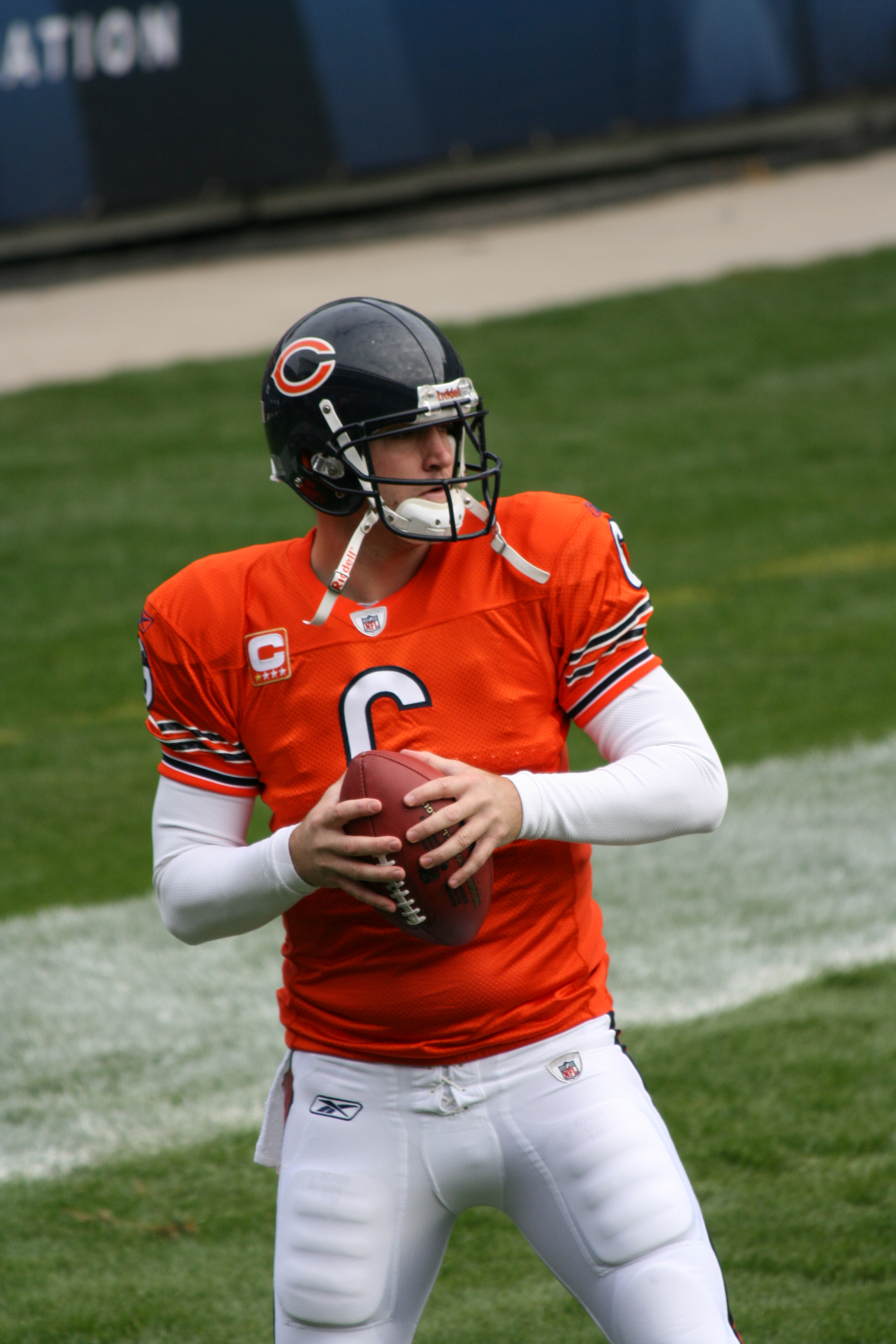
Jay Cutler in the orange alternate uniform.

The Chicago Bears of the National Football League (NFL) sport the bear head logo, which the team has used as their primary since 2023. Since its first season in 1920, the team has made only minor alterations to their uniforms and added various patches to them. The classic look of the club's uniforms has given them the title of one of the best uniform sets in the league. During its history, the Bears have worn uniforms manufactured by Nike, Reebok, and Champion.

== Logos ==
The club has had few official logos throughout their history. When the team was known as the Decatur Staleys in 1920, they used A. E. Staley's logo as football was intended to help promote the company. The first Chicago Bears logo was introduced in 1940, depicting a black bear running with a football. The next logo, introduced in 1946, featured a navy blue bear on top of a football.

In 1962, the Bears introduced their trademark "wishbone-C" logo for the first time. Initially white with a black outline, the logo is similar to the "C" long worn on the Cincinnati Reds' baseball caps, and very closely resembles the University of Chicago Maroons' "C" logo introduced in 1898. The change in the Bears' logo was due to the addition of logos on helmets, which professional football teams began adding in the late 1950s and early 1960s. Unlike some NFL franchises that have had many different logos over time, the Bears have kept the wishbone-C for over 50 years, with its only notable change being in 1974, when its color was changed to orange with a white and navy blue trim. However, the team has experimented with some alternative logos since then, including a navy blue bear head introduced in 1963, and a revised orange bear head introduced in 1999.

In 2023, the Bears made their primary logo the orange bear head, which was previously their secondary logo since 1999. Despite demoting the "C" to a secondary logo, the team will still retain it on their helmets and at the home field's 50-yard line. The shift aimed at aiding team and league business partners, as that logo will now use as "the primary visual identifier of the Chicago Bears".

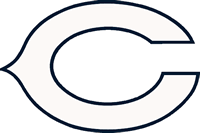
Primary logo (1962–1973)

Primary logo (1974–2022)
Secondary logo (2023–present)

Wordmark logo (1974–present)

Secondary logo (1999–2022)
Primary logo (2023–present)

== Uniforms ==
=== Helmets ===
From the 1940s until the late 1960s, the Bears, unlike most NFL teams, wore helmets and face masks made by the Chicago-based Wilson Sporting Goods. This headgear was of a slightly different shape than that of the Riddell company (also locally based in the Chicago area), the principal supplier to NFL teams. Gale Sayers's mid-1960s flared-ear Wilson helmet and white face mask with angled vertical bars are familiar to football fans. In 1982, the club's standard gray facemasks became dark blue. The gray facemasks and white 'C' logo returned in 2019 for the Bears' game against the New York Giants.

In 1994, in honor of the NFL's 75th anniversary, the Bears' helmets were all blue and without the logo. The Bears would don a similar helmet to the 1994 helmet with the Monsters of the Midway throwbacks, with the helmets still being blue but with a gray facemask.

=== Jerseys ===
In 1920, the Staleys introduced the official team uniforms of red jerseys with brown stripes. This design of vertical stripes was a popular trend for football jerseys of the 1920s; stripes were made up of strips of canvas that helped players grip the football, which was necessary because the standard football then in use was slightly fatter, rounder, and more difficult to handle than a modern football. The players' jersey number was displayed only on the back. After moving to Chicago and becoming the Bears, the team switched to blue jerseys in 1923. The color scheme was switched to navy blue and orange in honor of George Halas' alma mater, the University of Illinois.

In the 1930s, the franchise's team uniform underwent some substantial alterations, introducing a white jersey with orange-and-blue stripes in 1932. After various changes, by 1933, the Bears donned all-orange jerseys with navy numbers and matching navy blue helmets. The Bears also experimented with all-orange uniforms during the decade, which was booed by the New York crowd during a game against the New York Giants for being "loud". In 1935, the Bears introduced an orange jersey with black arm stripes. In 1936, they modified the design into "an early version of psychedelia" by adding three orange stripes to their helmets, changing the color of the jerseys from orange to white, complementing the new white jerseys with fourteen navy and orange alternating stripes on the sleeves, and introducing socks with a similar striped pattern extending from ankle to knee. Due to poor response from the fans and the media, this design lasted only one season.

By 1949, the team was wearing the familiar navy blue shirts with white, rounded numbers. In 1956, the team added "TV numbers" to the sleeves. By 1957 the NFL, in part for easier television viewing, ordered home teams to wear dark, primary-colored jerseys and road teams white; the Bears' white jersey featured blue numerals with orange trim, and the three parallel sleeve stripes, the top and bottom blue and the middle orange. By 1960 the team's home jerseys had added orange trim to the round white numerals (which became slightly smaller); the blue socks gained white borders to the orange stripes. In 1961 the orange sleeve stripes were given white borders. At the turn of the decade, the Bears added names to the back to the players jersey. The initials "GSH" were added to the left sleeve of the jerseys in the 1984 season, to honor Halas after his death in 1983.

For decades, the team was known as the only NFL team to wear jersey numbers that were not the traditional block-style numbers. Although a handful of other NFL teams such as the early-1960s Pittsburgh Steelers, and the Houston Oilers during their early AFL days experimented with rounder jersey numbers, by the mid-1960s the Bears were the only team left to continue wearing rounded jersey numbers, though on a few occasions in 1971 and 1972 the team appeared in jerseys with plain block numerals. Since the mid-1990s, however, several teams have shifted away from the block numbers in favor of numbers that match a specific team font (e.g. Denver Broncos, Baltimore Ravens, Philadelphia Eagles, etc.) or in the case of the Pittsburgh Steelers, match the jersey number font with the helmet numbers while otherwise leaving the jersey design alone.

In 2002, the Bears' blue became slightly darker in order "to achieve standardization among teams".

In 2012, the Bears received minor changes to the uniform after Nike took over as the official uniform supplier, with the numbers on the sleeve moved to the shoulder pads, and the "GSH" was enlarged.

=== Pants ===
The Bears' pants have substantially remained the same throughout, with blue pants having orange and white stripes, as well as white pants with blue and orange stripes. The team normally wears their blue pants with their away jerseys, and white pants at home. The addition of navy blue pants as a part of the road kit came in 1984. For a few games in the 1930s the Bears wore a combination of orange jerseys and orange pants. Stripes were added to the pants' sides in 1940.

The socks on the home uniforms are blue with orange stripes, resembling that of the stripes on the jersey, with the road uniform having alternating blue and orange stripes on white socks. The stripes were introduced in 1940.

The Bears' 2000 campaign was the first year in which the Bears returned to black shoes; they were previously worn from 1990 to 1992 and before 1974. They returned to wearing mainly white shoes in 2014, with some players also seen in either black, navy or orange shoes.

For unknown reasons, the video game Madden NFL 13 has the team wearing their away jerseys with orange pants, though the team has never worn the combination.

=== Patches and stickers ===
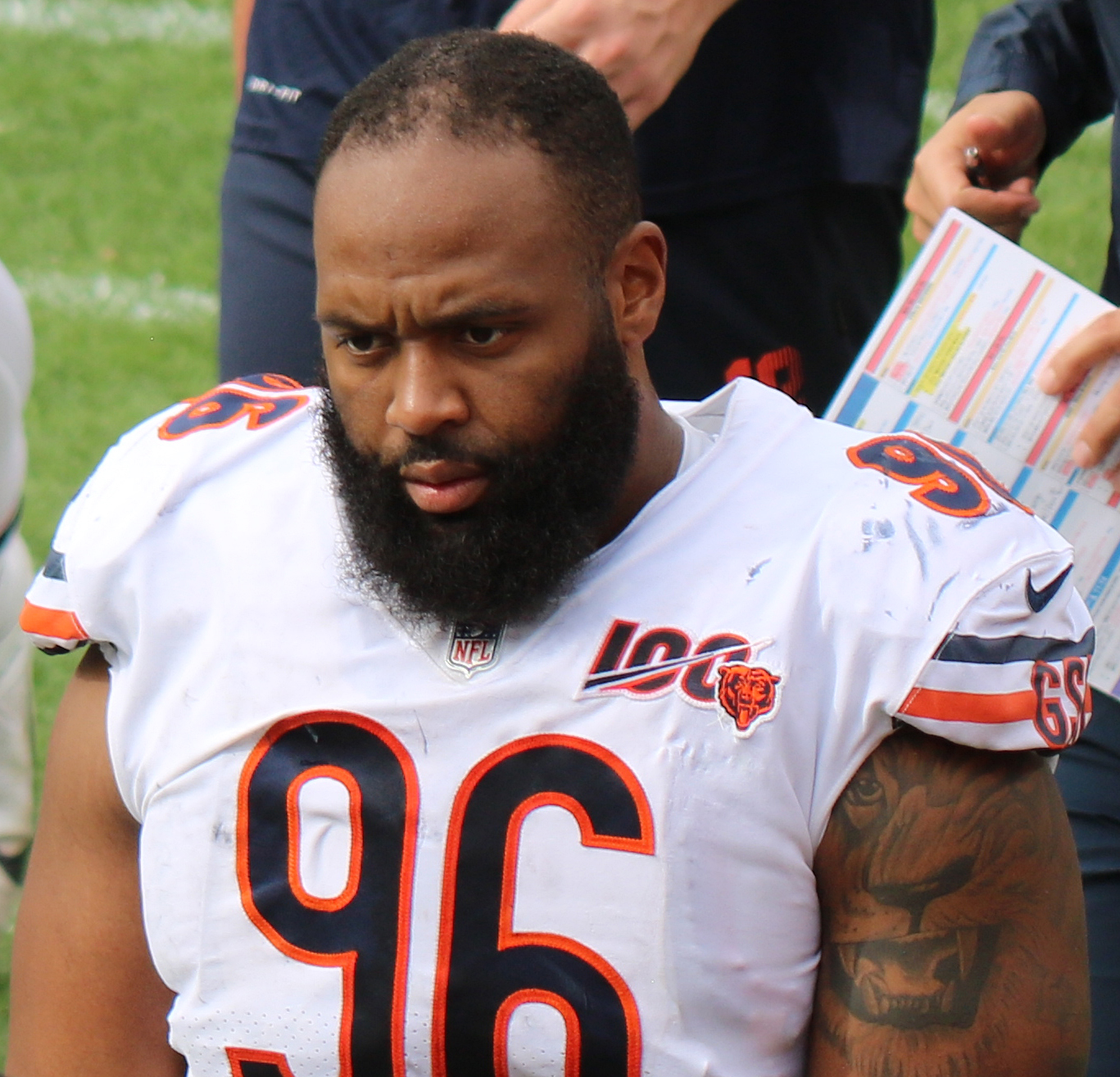
Akiem Hicks wearing a Bears100 patch in 2019

The Bears have worn various patches and stickers on their jerseys and helmets in certain tributes, such as to a recently deceased player or major team figure. After Halas' death in 1983, the team added a monogram-style "GHS" football patch (with the enlarged "H" in the middle position) to the front of the jerseys (which would morph into the aforementioned GSH on the sleeves the next year). In 2003, the Bears honored late team chairman Ed McCaskey with an orange shamrock-shaped patch featuring his initials "EWM".

In December 1990, the Bears wore a black No. 91 patch as a tribute to rookie defensive tackle Fred Washington, who died in a car accident. From November 1999 through the end of the season, the jerseys featured a No. 34 patch to honor running back Walter Payton, who died a week before the team's November 7 game against the Packers. During the 2010 season, the team wore a No. 99 sticker on the back of their helmets to mourn the death of defensive lineman Gaines Adams.

When linebacker Mike Singletary announced his retirement in 1992, the Bears honored him for his final home game at Soldier Field against the Pittsburgh Steelers by wearing black No. 50 patches. A poster of the patch was signed by players and coaches before being gifted to Singletary.

In 2001, the Bears wore a "Salute to Soldier Field" patch in honor of Soldier Field, which began its reconstruction that year.

To commemorate the Bears' centennial season in 2019, a Bears100 patch was featured on the jerseys.

In 2023, the Bears wore No. 51 patches as a tribute to Hall of Fame linebacker Dick Butkus, who died on October 5.

For the 2025 season, the Bears sported "VMH" patches (similar to the 1983 "GHS" patch) in memory of Virginia Halas McCaskey, while also wearing "76" helmet stickers in memory of Steve McMichael.

After the death of Mike Ditka in 2026, a No. 89 sticker was added to the helmet in Week 5. Starting with the following game, it was accommodated by an identical jersey patch.

=== Combinations and alternate uniforms ===
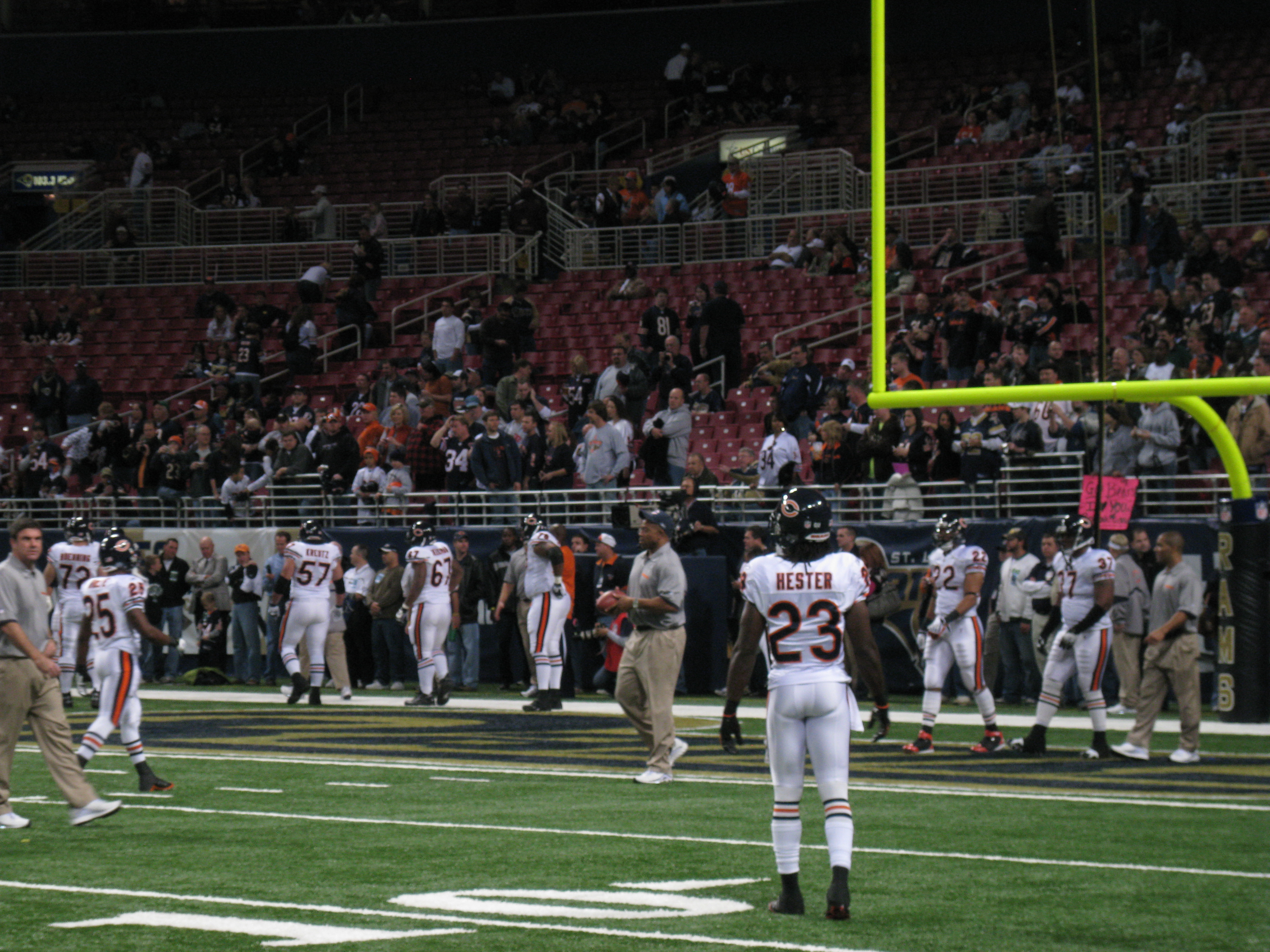
Bears players wearing a rare all-white kit in 2008.

During the 1994 season, the Bears – with most of the other NFL franchises – introduced throwback uniforms to be worn in the honor of the NFL's 75th Anniversary. These jerseys, with brown and blue stripes, resemble the original uniforms worn by the team in the 1920s, which came along with brown pants, as well as blank blue helmets.

On December 4, 1995, the Bears debuted an all-white kit against the Detroit Lions on Monday Night Football. The set was reminiscent of the team's initial road kit worn from 1957 to 1983; however, the striped navy blue socks were replaced by the road striped white socks. The Bears wore this combination again from 2000 to 2003, in 2006, 2008 and 2009. Also in 2000, the Bears brought back the all-white road kit with blue socks for three games: November 26 against the New York Jets, December 17 against the San Francisco 49ers, and December 24 against the Lions. In 2003 and 2008, along with the final two away games in the 2006 season, the Bears wore all-white uniforms for every road trip.

On October 7, 2002, the Bears wore navy blue pants with their navy blue home jerseys for the first time, and lost at home to Green Bay before a national Monday Night Football audience. The Bears then wore the all-blue combination again in 2006 regular season finale against the Packers, also a loss, on December 31. As part of the NFL Color Rush initiative, the Bears donned their all-blue uniforms, now replacing the road white socks of the original combination in favor of the home blue socks, for two Thursday Night Football games against the Packers in a 26–10 loss on October 20, 2016, and a 35–14 defeat on September 28, 2017. The Bears also wore the combination for the 2017 season opener against the Atlanta Falcons, also a loss. The all-blue set would return on January 8, 2023, in a losing effort against the Minnesota Vikings, but most players wore the combo with white socks while some went with blue socks. The Bears were winless in the all-blue uniforms, with a 0–6 record though 2024. The team wore the all-blue uniforms for their two postseason games during the 2025–26 NFL playoffs, where they went 1–1.

For the 2004 Thanksgiving Day game against the Dallas Cowboys, the Bears wore orange throwback jerseys. On November 13, 2005, and October 29, 2006 (both times in games against the San Francisco 49ers), the Bears introduced a different version of the orange jersey as an alternate. The orange swaps roles with the navy blue on this alternate jersey, as it becomes the dominant color while the navy complements. The Bears also donned the orange jerseys on October 28, 2007, against the Detroit Lions, a game that they lost 16–7. The Bears again wore the orange jerseys for the fourth consecutive year on October 19, 2008, when they hosted the Minnesota Vikings. The jerseys were replaced by throwback uniforms in 2012; their last game had been a November 2011 victory over the Lions. In 2018, defensive lineman Akiem Hicks tweeted his interest and supported an online petition calling to bring back the orange jerseys, while team chairman George McCaskey also voiced his approval of the design. The Bears followed by announcing the decision in March. In 2022, with the NFL once again allowing teams to wear a second helmet design after outlawing them in 2013, the Bears unveiled an alternate orange helmet to be paired with the orange uniforms. Also in 2022, the Bears started wearing orange socks with blue and white stripes with the orange alternates. The Bears wore the alternate orange jerseys with the orange helmets in 2022 against the Washington Commanders on Thursday Night Football and the Dallas Cowboys.

In 2010, the Bears introduced throwbacks representing the original Monsters of the Midway of the 1940s. They wore the uniforms against the Green Bay Packers on September 27, 2010, and against the Vikings on November 14 later that season. Both of those games were wins for the Bears. The throwbacks made a return for the 2012 season as the NFL switched to Nike uniforms. Despite reintroducing the orange jerseys for the 2018 season, the throwbacks were retained for the New York Jets game.

To celebrate the team's centennial anniversary in 2019, throwback uniforms based on the 1936 combination were introduced.

For the 2005–07 and 2010 home openers, two games in 2019, one in 2020 and one in 2021, the team wore the white jerseys with navy blue pants, and is 7–1 in these games, beating the Lions in 2005, 2006, and 2010, beating the Kansas City Chiefs in 2007, and beating the Minnesota Vikings and Dallas Cowboys wearing 1936 throwbacks in 2019, and the Houston Texans wearing the throwbacks in 2020, and 2022. The Bears lost to the Packers in 2021 while wearing the throwbacks.

For 2025, the Bears did not wear either their orange alternate or white throwback uniform as a tribute to Virginia Halas McCaskey, who died in February.

A new alternate uniform debuted in 2026 as part of Nike's "Rivalries" series. The uniform consisted of the orange helmet introduced in 2022, a navy jersey with vertical stripes and block numbers similar to the 1948 jesey, and orange pants. The "GHS" patch from 1983 was included on the jersey, while the back of the helmet had stars from the flag of Chicago.
