= L. J. Smith (author) =

American author (1958–2025)

- Born: Lisa Jane Smith; September 4, 1958; Fort Lauderdale, Florida, U.S.
- Died: March 8, 2025 (aged 66); Walnut Creek, California, U.S.
- Education: UC Santa Barbara (BA); San Francisco State University
- Occupation: Writer
- Partner: Julie Divola
- Writing career
- Pen name: L. J. Smith
- Language: English
- Period: 1987–2025
- Genres: Young adult, fantasy, horror, science fiction, romance
- Notable works: The Vampire Diaries; The Secret Circle; Night World
- Website: theljsmith.com

Lisa Jane Smith (September 4, 1958 – March 8, 2025) was an American author of young adult fiction best known for her best-selling series The Vampire Diaries, which has been turned into a successful television show. Her books, particularly The Vampire Diaries and Night World, have been in the New York Times Best Seller list and have been nominated for five awards.

== Early life and education ==
Smith was born on September 4, 1958, in Fort Lauderdale, Florida. As a child, she grew up in Villa Park, California and attended Villa Park High School. It was here that her high school English teacher, Zoe Gibbs, gave Smith the confidence to write.

Smith studied experimental psychology at the University of California, Santa Barbara. She later attended San Francisco State University to obtain teaching credentials.

== Career ==
Smith began her career as an elementary school teacher, but left in 1989 after three years to pursue writing.

Smith said that she realized she wanted to be a writer sometime between kindergarten and first grade, "when a teacher praised a horrible poem I'd written", and she began writing in earnest in elementary school.

Her first book, The Night of the Solstice, written during high school and college, was published by MacMillan in 1987, followed by Heart of Valor in 1990. They sold poorly, as they were labeled for 9 to 11-year-olds and not for young adults, as Smith wanted.

The Vampire Diaries series was commissioned by Elise Donner, editor of Alloy Entertainment in 1990: Smith immediately wrote the scene when Elena, Bonnie and Meredith are decorating the gym and the heroine meets Damon (scene later included in the first novel), while, as for the other characters, she adapted those of The Garden of Earthly Delights, an adult book she was writing. She chose the setting of The Vampire Diaries in Virginia because she has family there and was inspired by the small towns and lifestyles.

Three trilogies followed: The Secret Circle (1992), The Forbidden Game (1994) and Dark Visions (1995). The first installment of Night World series was published in 1996, followed by eight more over the next two years.

In 1998, Smith began a decade-long hiatus from writing, returning in 2008 with a new website and a series of new short stories. The Vampire Diaries series was reissued in 2007, followed by reprintings of The Secret Circle trilogy and Night World series in 2008–2009. The Night of the Solstice and Heart of Valor were also reissued in 2008. Three new Vampire Diaries installments were published in 2009 and 2010. The series was later adapted into a TV series (The Vampire Diaries) in 2009, as well as The Secret Circle, which became a TV series of the same name in 2011.

The final volume of The Vampire Diaries written entirely by Smith (The Return: Midnight) was released in March 2011. Smith submitted a draft of the next installment (The Hunters: Phantom), but after a dispute regarding a pivotal plot twist, her involvement was terminated by the publisher and the episode was revised by a ghostwriter. Subsequent Vampire Diaries installments have also been ghostwritten. She was also replaced on The Secret Circle series, by ghostwriter Aubrey Clark.

== Personal life ==
In 1998, Smith took a decade-long hiatus from writing to take care of her sister's children when her brother-in-law was diagnosed with metastatic melanoma. During this time, her mother died from lung cancer. Smith previously resided in Concord, California in 1991, and later moved to Danville, California. At the time of her death, she was in a relationship with lawyer Julie Divola.

=== Illness and death ===
In late 2015, Smith almost died from an undiagnosed granulomatosis with polyangiitis that kept her hospitalized for two months and on a ventilator for weeks: she suffered severe damage to her kidneys, heart, liver, and gallbladder. Smith died from complications of an autoimmune disease at a hospital in Walnut Creek, California, near her Danville home, on March 8, 2025, at the age of 66.

== Bibliography ==
=== Night World Series ===
1. Secret Vampire (1996) ISBN 0-340-69994-9
2. Daughters of Darkness (1996) ISBN 0-340-68982-X
3. Spellbinder (1996) ISBN 978-0-671-55135-3 (called Enchantress in the UK and Australia versions)
4. Dark Angel (1996) ISBN 0-671-55136-1
5. The Chosen (1997) ISBN 0-340-69003-8
6. Soulmate (1997) ISBN 0-340-69004-6
7. Huntress (1997) ISBN 0-340-70953-7
8. Black Dawn (1997) ISBN 0-340-70954-5
9. Witchlight (1998) ISBN 0-340-70955-3
10. Strange Fate (TBA)

==== Omnibuses ====
- Night World: Secret Vampire, Daughters of Darkness, Spellbinder (Enchantress) (2008) ISBN 978-1-41-697450-5
- Night World: Dark Angel, The Chosen, Soulmate (2008) ISBN 978-1-41-697451-2
- Night World: Huntress, Black Dawn, Witchlight (2009) ISBN 978-1-41-697452-9

==== Short stories ====
Published on Lisa Jane Smith's official website.

- Thicker Than Water – Featuring Keller, Rashel, Galen and Quinn
- Ash and Mary-Lynnette: Those Who Favor Fire
- Jez and Morgead's Night Out

=== The Vampire Diaries Universe ===
==== The Vampire Diaries Series ====
1. The Awakening: Volume I (1991) ISBN 978-1-4449-0071-2
2. The Struggle: Volume II (1991) ISBN 978-0-06-199076-2
3. The Fury: Volume III (1991) ISBN 978-0-06-199077-9
4. Dark Reunion: Volume IV (1992) ISBN 0-06-105992-7 (The Reunion in the UK and Australia version)

==== The Vampire Diaries: The Return Trilogy ====
1. The Return: Nightfall (2009) ISBN 9780061720802
2. The Return: Shadow Souls (2010) ISBN 978-0-06-172083-3
3. The Return: Midnight (2011) ISBN 978-0-06-172085-7

==== The Vampire Diaries: The Hunters Trilogy ====
1. The Hunters: Phantom (2011) (Written by a ghostwriter)
2. The Hunters: Moonsong (2012) (Written by a ghostwriter)
3. The Hunters: Destiny Rising (2012) (Written by a ghostwriter)

==== The Vampire Diaries: The Salvation Trilogy ====
1. The Salvation: Unseen (2013) (Written by Aubrey Clark)
2. The Salvation: Unspoken (2013) (Written by Aubrey Clark)
3. The Salvation: Unmasked (2014) (Written by Aubrey Clark)

==== Omnibuses ====
- The Awakening and The Struggle (2007) ISBN 978-1-41-782599-8
- The Fury and Dark Reunion (2007) ISBN 978-0-06-114098-3

==== Short stories ====
Published on Lisa Jane Smith's official website.

- "Matt and Elena – First Date" (2010)
- "Matt and Elena – Tenth Date: On Wickery Pond" (2010)
- "Bonnie and Damon: After Hours" (2011)
- "An Untold Tale: Blood Will Tell" (2010)
- "An Untold Tale: Elena's Christmas" (2010)

==== Cuts from The Return: Shadow Souls ====
Published on Lisa Jane Smith's official website.

- Damon and Elena: Tumbleweeds (2011)
- Dinner Disaster (2010)

==== The Vampire Diaries: Evensong ====
Note: These books were published as fanfiction on Kindle Worlds after Smith's publisher hired other authors to continue the series after The Return: Midnight. They pick up after the ending of said book, and while they do represent the original author's intended continuation, they are not considered official canon to the main Vampire Diaries series due to their status.

- Paradise Lost (2014)
- The War of Roses (2014)
- Into the Wood (TBA)

=== The Secret Circle Series ===
1. The Initiation (1992) ISBN 978-0-06-106712-9
2. The Captive (1992) ISBN 978-0-06-106715-0
3. The Power (1992) ISBN 978-0-06-106719-8
4. The Divide (2012) ISBN 978-0-06-213039-6 (Written by Aubrey Clark)
5. The Hunt (2012) ISBN 978-0-06-213042-6 (Written by Aubrey Clark)
6. The Temptation (2013) (Written by Aubrey Clark)

==== Omnibuses ====
- The Initiation and The Captive Part I (2008) ISBN 978-0-06-167085-5
- The Captive Part II and The Power (2008) ISBN 978-0-06-167135-7

=== The Forbidden Game Series ===
1. The Hunter (1994) ISBN 978-0-671-87451-3
2. The Chase (1994) ISBN 978-0-671-87452-0
3. The Kill (1994) ISBN 978-0-671-87453-7
4. Rematch (TBA)

==== Omnibus ====
- The Forbidden Game: The Hunter, The Chase, The Kill (2010) ISBN 978-1-41-698940-0

=== Dark Visions Series ===
1. The Strange Power (1994) ISBN 978-0-671-87454-4
2. The Possessed (1995) ISBN 978-0-671-87455-1
3. The Passion (1995) ISBN 978-0-671-87456-8
4. Blindsight (TBA)

==== Omnibus ====
- Dark Visions: The Strange Power, The Possessed, The Passion (2009) ISBN 978-1-41-698956-1

=== Wildworld Series ===
1. The Night of the Solstice (1987) ISBN 978-1-4169-9840-2
2. Heart of Valor (1990) ISBN 978-1-4169-9841-9
3. Mirrors of Heaven (TBA)

=== Novels ===
- Eternity: A Vampire Love Story (TBA)
- The Last Lullaby (TBA)
