= The Initiation (novel) =

1992 novel by L. J. Smith

- First edition
- Author: L. J. Smith
- Language: English
- Series: The Secret Circle series
- Genre: Fantasy, Romance, Young adult fiction
- Publisher: HarperCollins
- Publication date: September 15, 1992
- Media type: Print (Paperback)
- Pages: 320 pp (first edition)
- ISBN: 0061067121
- Followed by: The Captive; The Power; The Divide; The Hunt; The Temptation

The Initiation, the first part in a series of works entitled The Secret Circle, is a young adult novel by author L. J. Smith. Smith is famous for her other works such as The Vampire Diaries and the Night World series.

The novel follows a young girl, Cassie Blake, who moves to New Salem. She befriends a mysterious group of teenagers who run the high school. She finds out that she's part of a coven of witches, and on top of that, the boy she's destined to be with is dating her best friend.

== Plot ==
A chance encounter brings sixteen-year-old Cassie Blake to fall for the mysterious Adam Conant. After meeting him, she rids herself of the idea of a relationship with him because she thinks they’ll never see each other again. Cassie and her mother move to New Salem, and, much to her surprise, Adam is there. At her new high school, Cassie encounters a strange group of students who rule the student population. In time, she meets Diana, the fair-haired beauty, whom Cassie comes to love like a sister. Faye Chamberlain, the voluptuous and dark puppet master, desires to turn Cassie into her plaything. After her encounters with the group of students, Cassie learns that she, along with the other students, is a witch. Cassie later finds that the boy she feels sparks with, is actually the boyfriend of Diana, leader of the coven and Cassie’s best friend.

== Main characters ==
=== Cassie Blake ===
Cassie is shy and withdrawn, until she meets Adam. As the main protagonist of the novel, Cassie’s journey involves the sticky situation of falling in love with her best friend’s boyfriend. She finds out that she is a witch, and is later initiated into the coven. She is described as having light-brown soft wavy hair with hidden colors woven through it, blue-silver eyes and a slight build. Her birthday is July 23. She lives in a Georgian Postrevolutionary that belonged to her maternal grandparents Maeve Howard and her late husband at 12 Crowhaven Road, New Salem MA. Her parents are Alexandra Blake (née Howard) and John Blake aka Black John. She has a half sister named Scarlett Forsythe from her father. Her working crystal is a Hematite. The master tool she uses is a bracelet. She is connected to her soulmate Adam by a silver cord. Cassie has an affinity for fire and can have her mind read by Adam, no matter the distance. She drives a Volkswagen Rabbit, that formerly belonged to Maeve.

=== Faye Chamberlain ===
Faye, the antagonist, pushes her friends, and first cousin, Diana, around a lot because she enjoys the thrill of it. Faye longs for the rush of power that magic brings her. She believes that magic should be used to benefit those who can wield it. 16 at the start of The Initiation she turns 17 alongside Diana on November 10. She has long black hair, honey gold eyes and overtly sensual mannerisms. She lives at number 6 Crowhaven Road, New Salem MA. Her mother is a widow, her father Grant Chamberlain having died 16 years before the start of the story. She passes her time by flirting with Nick Armstrong whom she had an 'arrangement' of sorts before the start of the series and making mischief with her friends Susan Whittier, Deborah Armstrong, Chris and Doug Henderson. She had a crush on an outsider Jeffery Lovegood and on witch hunter Max Boylan who turned out to be using her. She drives a Corvette CR1. And has two kittens.

=== Diana Meade ===
Diana, Cassie’s best friend and 'adoptive' sister and Faye’s first cousin, is the leader of the coven of witches. As the embodiment of everything light and good in the world, Diana believes that magic should be harnessed for positive purposes.16 at the start of the series she turns 17 alongside Faye on November 10. She has long, silky blonde hair that's described as moonlight and sunlight woven together, emerald green eyes and impossibly flawless skin. Her working crystal is quartz. She lives at number 1 on Crowhaven Road in a yellow Victorian. Her dad's a lawyer whom she often makes dinner for. Her mom passed away 16 years before the start of the series. Her book of shadows was one of the first they found. She and Adam Conant were childhood sweethearts but later breakup due to Diana giving Cassie the Chalcedony Rose. She later finds her soulmate in Max Boylan, reformed witch hunter. She drives a blue Acura Integra.

=== Melanie Glaser ===
With an above average knowledge of crystals, Melanie is an expert on the mysterious crystals in the coven of witches. She becomes fast friends with Cassie. Melanie has a calm and collected personality, and she is a friend to Diana. She believes that magic should be used for good. Her birthday is November 7.

=== Adam Conant ===
Adam practices good magic and is the all-around boy next-door type. His girlfriend is Diana, but he quickly falls for Cassie after their chance meeting. He is friends with Faye, Melanie, and Nick.

=== Nick Armstrong ===
Nick is very mysterious and quiet, but over time becomes more outgoing. He is a member of the coven, he has a rivalry with Adam.

Deborah Armstrong

Chris Henderson

Doug Henderson

Suzan Whittier

Laurel Quincey

Sean Dulany

== Editions ==
The novel has been published in many editions in hardcover, paperback, and e-book form. In 2008, HarperCollins Publishers released an omnibus edition of the novel entitled "The Initiation and the Captive (Part 1)," which included the first novel and the first half of the second novel in the series.

== Awards and recognition ==
- Ranked on Publishers Weekly's Top 200 List for Children's Paperback Backlist in 2009. The book sold over 120,000 copies.
- In 2012, listed as Barnes & Noble's Spotlight Pick.

== Reception ==
The Initiation has received much critical acclaim since its release in 1992. A member of the site So Many Books, So Little Time, wrote that the novel is "one of the best books about witches" they have read. A user by the pseudonym of prophecygirl at Wondrous Reads said that the novel was "fast moving and easy to read." The user goes on to say that "it is still just as good over a decade later." A member of The Juggler, in affiliation with the Pagan Newswire Collective, posted a review stating that The Initiation was 'fairly Pagan-positive and aware,' and that Smith "seems to get modern witches in a way that most authors do not."

== The series ==
"The Secret Circle" series includes six novels, but L. J. Smith only wrote the first three novels. The second three are written by Aubrey Clark.

The novels written by L. J. Smith within the series are:

- The Initiation (1992)
- The Captive (1992)
- The Power (1992)

Other novels in the series, by Aubrey Clark, are:

- The Divide (2012)
- The Hunt (2012)
- The Temptation (2013)

== Adaptation ==
The CW picked up the pilot of The Secret Circle in 2011. After just one season, the show was canceled.
