= Initiator =

An initiator can refer to:

- A person who instigates something.
- Modulated neutron initiator, a neutron source used in some nuclear weapons
  - Initiator, an Explosive booster
  - Initiator, the first Nuclear chain reaction
- Pyrotechnic initiator, a device containing a pyrotechnic composition used primarily to ignite other, more difficult to ignite materials
- Radical initiator, chemical substances that can produce radical species under mild conditions
  - Photoinitiator, chemical substances that produce radical specials upon exposure to light
- SCSI initiator, the host-side endpoint of a SCSI session
- Monomeric polyols, such as glycerin, pentaerythritol, ethylene glycol and sucrose, serving as the starting point for polymeric polyols

== Biology ==
- Initiator element
- Initiator protein
- Initiation factor

== Computers ==
- The Initiator of OS/360 and successors.

== See also ==
- Initiation (disambiguation)
- Initiate
