= Neofit =

Neofit (Неофит) is the Slavic form of the Greek name Neophytos, and may refer to:

- Neofit of Bulgaria (1945–2024), Bulgarian Orthodox primate
- Neofit II (1778–1850), Romanian priest, head of the provisional government during the Wallachian Revolution of 1848
- Neofit Bozveli (c. 1785–1848), Bulgarian cleric and enlightener
- Neofit Rilski or Neophyte of Rila (1793–1881), Bulgarian monk, teacher and artist
- Neofit (Nevodchikov) (1822–1910), Archbishop of Chișinău 1892–98

== Places ==
- Neofit Peak, mountain in Antarctica named after Neofit Rilski

== See also ==
- South-West University "Neofit Rilski", university in Blagoevgrad, Bulgaria
- Neophyte (disambiguation)
- Neophytus (disambiguation)
