= Novice, Texas =

- City
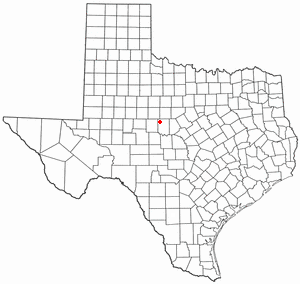
- Location of Novice, Texas

- Coordinates: 31°59′13″N 99°37′31″W
- Country: United States
- State: Texas
- County: Coleman

Area
  - Total: 0.48 sq mi (1.25 km^{2})
  - Land: 0.48 sq mi (1.25 km^{2})
  - Water: 0 sq mi (0.00 km^{2})
- Elevation: 1,982 ft (604 m)

Population (2020)
  - Total: 122
  - Density: 253/sq mi (97.6/km^{2})
- Time zone: UTC-6 (Central (CST))
  - Summer (DST): UTC-5 (CDT)
- ZIP code: 79538
- Area code: 325
- FIPS code: 48-52668
- GNIS feature ID: 2411284

Novice is a city in Coleman County, Texas, United States. Its population was 122 at the 2020 census.

== Geography ==
Novice is located in northwestern Coleman County. U.S. Route 84 passes 2 miles (3 km) to the northeast of town, leading 17 miles (27 km) southeast to Coleman, the county seat, and 35 miles (56 km) north to Abilene.

According to the United States Census Bureau, Novice has a total area of 0.46 square miles (1.2 km^{2}), all land.

== Demographics ==
Historical population
| Census | Pop. | Note | %± |
|---|---|---|---|
| 1950 | 252 | | — |
| 1960 | 227 | | −9.9% |
| 1970 | 191 | | −15.9% |
| 1980 | 201 | | 5.2% |
| 1990 | 183 | | −9.0% |
| 2000 | 142 | | −22.4% |
| 2010 | 139 | | −2.1% |
| 2020 | 122 | | −12.2% |
U.S. Decennial Census

=== 2020 census ===
As of the 2020 census, Novice had a population of 122 in 52 households, including 12 families, and a median age of 55.5 years. 11.5% of residents were under the age of 18 and 32.8% were 65 years of age or older. For every 100 females there were 106.8 males, and for every 100 females age 18 and over there were 111.8 males age 18 and over.

There were 52 households in Novice, of which 21.2% had children under the age of 18 living in them. Of all households, 42.3% were married-couple households, 23.1% were households with a male householder and no spouse or partner present, and 23.1% were households with a female householder and no spouse or partner present. About 25.0% of all households were made up of individuals and 19.2% had someone living alone who was 65 years of age or older.

There were 70 housing units, of which 25.7% were vacant. The homeowner vacancy rate was 0.0% and the rental vacancy rate was 40.0%.

0.0% of residents lived in urban areas, while 100.0% lived in rural areas.

Racial composition as of the 2020 census
| Race | Number | Percent |
|---|---|---|
| White | 113 | 92.6% |
| Black or African American | 0 | 0.0% |
| American Indian and Alaska Native | 0 | 0.0% |
| Asian | 3 | 2.5% |
| Native Hawaiian and Other Pacific Islander | 0 | 0.0% |
| Some other race | 0 | 0.0% |
| Two or more races | 6 | 4.9% |
| Hispanic or Latino (of any race) | 6 | 4.9% |

=== 2000 census ===
As of the census of 2000, 142 people, 57 households, and 40 families were residing in the city. The population density was 314.2 people/sq mi (121.8/km^{2}). The 65 housing units averaged 143.8/sq mi (55.8/km^{2}). The racial makeup of the city was 98.6% White, 0.7% Native American, and 0.7% from two or more races. Hispanics or Latinos of any race were 5.63% of the population.

Of the 57 households, 28.1% had children under 18 living with them, 63.2% were married couples living together, 5.3% had a female householder with no husband present, and 29.8% were not families. About 28.1% of all households were made up of individuals, and 14.0% had someone living alone who was 65 years of age or older. The average household size was 2.49, and the average family size was 3.08.

In the city, the age distribution was 27.5% under 18, 4.2% from 18 to 24, 29.6% from 25 to 44, 19.0% from 45 to 64, and 19.7% who were 65 or older. The median age was 39 years. For every 100 females, there were 100.0 males. For every 100 females age 18 and over, there were 102.0 males.

The median income for a household in the city was $30,833, and for a family was $32,000. Males had a median income of $22,250 versus $16,250 for females. The per capita income for the city was $11,766. About 14.3% of families and 19.3% of the population were living below the poverty line, including 26.5% of those under 18 and 11.1% of those over 64.

== Education ==
The city was served by the Novice Independent School District until June 2012. In the summer of 2012, Novice ISD board members voted to consolidate with a neighboring school district, but the exact plans had yet to be decided. The district formally consolidated with Coleman ISD on March 1, 2013.

== Notable person ==
- Randy McAllister, born in Dallas, Texas; American blues and Americana drummer, harmonica player, singer, and songwriter was raised in Novice
