= Dark Visions Trilogy =

Dark Visions
- The Strange Power; The Possessed; The Passion; Trilogy edition (ISBN 1416989560)
- Author: L. J. Smith
- Language: English
- Genre: Horror, Fantasy, Romance, Young adult fiction
- Publisher: Simon & Schuster
- Published: 1994 - 1995
- Media type: Print (Hardcover & Paperback), eBook
- No. of books: 3

Dark Visions is a trilogy of young adult fiction by L. J. Smith written in the mid-1990s. The story follows the protagonist, Kaitlyn Fairchild, as she attends, uncovers a plot, and ultimately defeats the Zetes Institute, a place where she went to learn about her own psychic powers. Kaitlyn and the four other psychics at the live-in Zetes Institute are the most powerful psychics in the country in their age group. They come from all areas of the U.S. and become best of friends.

The trilogy was published as one book in Trade Paperback and eBook format on September 8, 2009.

In October 2010, L.J. Smith announced that she has planned out a sequel to the trilogy, titled Blindsight.

== Plot summary ==
=== The Strange Power ===
Kaitlyn Fairchild is a psychic teenager who is believed to be a witch. She has the power to see into the future. She is able to visualize her premonitions through drawings, but she often cannot interpret them until it is too late. She is offered a place by Joyce Piper, at a psychic research center known as the Zetes Institute, and after seeing a child get hurt, as foreseen by one of her premonitions, she agrees to go to the institute with four other teenagers who have powers of their own. She quickly befriends three of the other teens, Anna Eva Whiteraven, Lewis Chao and Rob Kessler, and forms feelings for Rob; the fifth psychic, Gabriel Wolfe is aloof and reluctant to form friendships with anyone except Kaitlyn. While at the institute, they are tested on their psychic abilities, but a mysterious man warns Kaitlyn that the institute is dangerous, and even the sullen housekeeper Marisol warns them to get out as soon as possible, after which she goes into coma. The psychics become suspicious and begin to believe the warnings about the institute. They investigate and find a secret passageway, which contains plans to turn them into psychic weapons to sell to major corporations, and a file about Project Black Lightning, a previous project in which other psychics were tested upon and 'terminated'. The teens almost get caught by the head of the institute, Mr. Zetes, and Gabriel locks the five of them into a psychic link to save them. The link allows them to 'hear' each other's thoughts and communicate, but they cannot get rid of it afterwards so they try to find a way to break the link, but discover that the only way is for one of them to die. Eventually, Mr. Zetes talks to Gabriel and invites him to his mansion to discuss his future, as he believes Gabriel is ready to join him in his plans to create psychic weapons. Kaitlyn overhears the conversation and offers to join too, so she can find out what is really happening. At the mansion, Mr. Zetes shows them a giant crystal that will make them powerful weapons by amplifying their psychic powers but he admits that it can warp minds and make them evil, as he found out with 'Project Black Lightning', and Kaitlyn becomes angry. Mr. Zetes traps Kaitlyn for defying him, and he puts the crystal to Gabriel's forehead to force him to join him, which causes Gabriel great pain and knocks him out. The others use the psychic link to track them and save them, with Joyce helping them, but Joyce reveals herself to be on Mr. Zetes' side. Gabriel awakens from his unconscious state and knocks out Mr. Zetes and Joyce. Rob admits to Kaitlyn that he is in love with her, after he realised he couldn't lose her, and the five psychics escape and decide to flee from the institute.

=== The Possessed ===
The second novel of the trilogy is essentially a journey to an unknown place. After Kaitlyn and the other four psychics have escaped from the Zetes Institute, they find themselves homeless. They dream of a place by the sea with a white house, and they believe it is a vision of a place that will be able to help them find a way to break their telepathic web and fight Mr. Zetes. They manage to get a van and supplies from Marisol's brother, Tony Diaz, who is suspicious that Mr. Zetes is the cause of his sister's sudden coma. For his help, they tell him they will do whatever is in their power to heal Marisol. The group begins to travel North searching for this place with only clues from their dreams. Meanwhile, Gabriel has discovered that the crystal has made him much more powerful, but turned him into a 'psychic vampire' which means he has to drain people of their energy to survive. Kaitlyn discovers this when she finds him leeching life energy from an innocent girl and she offers to help him by giving him her energy, which he is reluctant to accept as he wants to keep his vampirism a secret from the rest of the group, but he takes her offer as his need for energy possesses him. Whilst on the journey, the group become victim to psychic attacks and realise that Mr. Zetes is using other psychics to try to break the group apart. One of the psychic traps causes Kaitlyn to crash their van, and forces the group to hitchhike their way to Anna's family home in Washington State to get help. They are picked up by a girl named Lydia who offers to drive them there; however, Kaitlyn feels suspicious of Lydia without knowing why. Once they arrive at Anna's family home, Anna's parents try to take matters into their own hands and call the police to report Mr Zetes. The group stays the night, and during the night, Kait has a premonition telling them that Lydia is with Mr Zetes. Lydia confesses that she is the daughter of Mr. Zetes, but she tells them that she hates her father and that she is there to help them. She also tells them that the police are powerless against Mr Zetes, so she tells them where the white house is and that 'The People Of the Crystal' who live there may be able to help them. They run away from Anna's house to continue their journey. On the journey, Kaitlyn shares her energy with Gabriel and she finds out that Gabriel is falling in love with her, and then Rob finds out about Gabriel's condition and that Kaitlyn has been helping him, and he feels betrayed by her. They tell the group and Gabriel becomes more determined to find The People of the Crystal because he believes they could help him. A few days later they arrive at the house, and the psychics find out that The People of the Crystal are pacifists and cannot help them; they just want them to join their coven so they can protect them. They also turn down Gabriel as he has killed a person with his power before, which leads him to betray them and join Mr Zetes with Lydia. He calls an attack on The People of the Crystal, which kills their leader and shatters their crystal, leaving them defenceless. They give the other four psychics a shard of the crystal, and tell them it can destroy Mr Zetes' crystal, so they set off to defeat Mr Zetes and get Gabriel back.

=== The Passion ===
This is the final part of the series, and Kaitlyn, Lewis, Rob and Anna are trying to create a plan to defeat Mr Zetes. Gabriel has joined Mr. Zetes, and he finds the other four psychics one night with Tony, at Marisol's house. Gabriel tries to attack Kaitlyn and the others to get the shard of the last perfect crystal they are hiding, as he knows it will destroy Mr Zetes and his personal rise to power. However Gabriel holds back because of his feelings for Kaitlyn, and leaves without the shard. Kaitlyn then leaves the others without telling them, as she believes she can independently infiltrate the Institute by using Gabriel's feelings for her. She finds Gabriel after he rescues her from a man attacking her, and she lies to him by telling him that she left everything for him and that she wants to be on his side; the 'winning side'. Gabriel brings her to the institute, and she is settled in with the previous psychics from project "Black Lightning", to create a psychic strike team. These psychics are Sabrina Jessica Gallo (Bri), Laurie Frost (Frost), Paul Renfrew (Renny) and John MacCorkendale (Jackal Mac), all of which are mentally twisted and psychic vampires because of the crystal. Kaitlyn tries to convince them all that she is on their side, whilst gathering information on them and trying to find the location of Mr Zetes crystal. Gabriel becomes suspicious of Kait when she refuses to share her energy with him, and he believes she is a spy and threatens to kill her if she gets in his way of his rise to power, after which he shuns her for Frost and regards her coldly. Kaitlyn passes the institute's test by committing a felony of $20 million with the psychic strike team, which leads them to trust her, except for Gabriel who is waiting for her to get caught out as a spy. Kaitlyn is eventually caught by Mr Zetes when she cracks the code for the location of the crystal, and he puts her in an isolation tank, where he hopes she will be driven to insanity. Gabriel becomes worried about Kaitlyn when he can no longer feel her presence in the psychic link and he reaches out for her with his telepathy. He helps her preserve her mind by showing her memories and communicating with her, and they both confess their true depths of feelings for each other. When Mr Zetes takes Kaitlyn out the isolation tank, he realises his plan has not worked and he takes Kaitlyn to the crystal to destroy her mind. Rob, Anna, Lewis and Tamsin from the fellowship of the crystal, turn up to rescue them, and they succeed in destroying the crystal and Mr Zetes when Gabriel unites the shard with the evil crystal. When the crystal is shattered, Joyce's mind and the other psychic's minds are returned to them, and they realise the mistakes they made in joining Mr Zetes. After that, Kaitlyn realises her affections have shifted from Rob to Gabriel and she is torn between the two, but when Rob is healing Gabriel's injuries from the crystal, he finds cuts and burns on Gabriel's arm and he realises that he had been hurting himself to stay in contact with Kait when she was in isolation. He asks Gabriel if he loves Kaitlyn and he admits he does, so Rob lets go of Kaitlyn and gives her and Gabriel his blessings to be together, and Kait telepathically gives Anna blessings to be with Rob as she knows they are meant to be together. The story ends with Frost and Jackal Mac running away, while Bri, Renny and Joyce decide to go with Tamsin to the Fellowship of the People of the Crystal. Rob, Anna and Lewis also decide to go to the People of the Crystal, as they believe they can help there and Rob feels it's his destiny to heal there, and Marisol returns after being healed by the shard of the crystal. The final scene is of Lewis taking a photograph of everyone linked together.

== Characters ==
=== Kaitlyn Fairchild ===
Kaitlyn Brady Fairchild, known as Kait, is the 17-year-old protagonist of the series. Her psychic talent is that she (usually subconsciously) creates drawings that are premonitions. Her inability to understand the drawings until too late drives her to attend the Zetes Institute. Her psychic powers and strange appearance make her different and disliked by her classmates in Ohio. Even though she is considered beautiful people believe she is a witch. Because of this, she is strong-willed, stubborn, defensive and dislikes boys in the beginning of the series. As she moves to San Carlos, CA and joins the institute, she begins to soften. She even falls for the sweet hearted boy Rob, but later on falls in love with Gabriel and they get together and Rob gives them his blessing. Kaitlyn is described as having long red hair, fair skin, and smoky blue eyes with darker rings of blue around the pupil.

=== Kait's Group ===
- Rob Kessler (also seventeen) is a North Carolina native and another attendee of the Zetes Institute. His power is the ability to heal by manipulating life energy (also described as chi or "qi"). He discovered these powers after a hang-gliding accident when he was fourteen, which left him in a coma for some time. He then attended another psychic research facility in Durham, NC, where he originally met Gabriel Wolfe. The accident also seems to have taken away Rob's awareness of "girls", and at the start of the trilogy, he is unable to conceive of anything beyond a platonic relationship with a girl. However, by the end of The Strange Power, he and Kait are romantically linked. Rob is described as having blonde hair and golden eyes. His aura is warm, bright and calm.
- Gabriel Wolfe (also seventeen) is the ambiguous character that eventually joins the light side. He comes to the Zetes Institute from jail, having previously killed by accident and in self-defense. He is a telepath, and when he uses his power on minds that are weaker than his, he drains those people of their life energy. He later has to drain peoples life energy to stay alive (The Possessed and The Passion), and Kaitlyn helps him by giving him her energy. His power is described as the most powerful of the group. He is antagonistic towards Rob and is indifferent to the others in the group, besides Kait. As the series progresses, Kait's romantic feelings gradually shift from Rob to Gabriel. Gabriel also has romantic interest in Kait but tries to deny it. Gabriel is described as having black hair, pale skin, and dark grey eyes. His aura is aggressive, mysterious and dark.
- Anna Eva Whiteraven (also seventeen) is the only other girl at the Zetes Institute and is from Washington State. She is Native American and described as having long black hair. She is very peaceful and gentle girl who becomes Kait's roommate at the institute. Her psychic abilities allow her to communicate with animals and control them. She has romantic interest in Rob the whole series but respects Kait's prior claim on him; eventually she becomes the love interest for Rob. Her aura is serene and natural.
- Lewis Chao (also seventeen) is from San Francisco and is the last of the group at the Zetes Institute. He is Asian-American and described to be friendly and obsessed with technology. He has the ability of psychokinesis, the ability to move (small) objects with his mind; later he uses his abilities to jam radio frequencies, set off telephones, even open hidden doors. He is Rob's roommate at the institute. He also has an interest for Lydia. He is described as having short black hair and almond shaped eyes. His aura is optimistic and funny.

=== Zetes Institute ===
- Emmanuel Zetes is the villain of the story. He is very wealthy and founded the Zetes Institute for research on psychic phenomena. However, it is revealed that the institute is actually preparing psychics to perform as a special for-hire task force for criminal activities. He is the owner of a "firestone" or "great crystal", which can store and enhance psychic energy.
- Joyce Piper is the parapsychologist at the Zetes Institute. At first, she is very friendly and earnest. However, it is revealed at the end of The Strange Power that she is in on a plot to use the psychics for crime. But later, she turns out that she was good after all.
- Marisol Diaz is an assistant at the Institute and helps Joyce run experiments as well as perform household duties. Marisol worked for the Zetes Foundation before Joyce and was involved in the mysterious pilot experiment that took place before the Kait and her fellow psychics arrived. Early on, Marisol tries to warn Kait about strange happenings at the Institute and ends up in a coma for most of the series.
- Lydia Zetes is the eighteen-year-old daughter of Mr. Zetes. She is sent as a spy into Kait's group in The Possessed and eventually joins, then betrays the group. She is timid and afraid of her father and the dark psychics, but eventually helps Kait in the end.
- The Dark Psychics are the psychics that participated in the pilot experiment that preceded Kait and the other's arrival. They were the best young psychics in the San Francisco area, but their powers proved to be insufficient to withstand contact with Mr. Zetes' crystal. They are described as having been reduced to "insanity and idiocy." However, once Kait's group leaves the institute, Mr. Zetes gathers these psychics to find the group and destroy the Fellowship. Because of their use of the crystal, they are psychic vampires and need an outside source of life energy (from other people or from the crystal) to survive. The dark psychics include:
  - Sabrina Jessica Gallo's (also known as Bri) psychic power is dowsing, or being able to locate something from afar. She joins Kait's group in the end.
  - Laurie Frost's (known as Frost) psychic ability is psychometry, or being able to determine someone's thoughts and feelings by touch. She has an antagonistic relationship with Kait, partially because of her romantic relationship with Gabriel.
  - Paul Renfrew (known as Renny) has, like Lewis, psychokinesis and can move objects with his mind. He also joins Kait's group in the end.
  - John MacCorkendale (known as Jackal Mac) has the ability to perform astral projection of his own body and to lead others. He is also antagonistic towards Kait and tries to take life energy from her at one point.
  - Sasha and Parté King (real names unknown) lost their minds because of the crystal. Their powers became very strong, but they are no longer aware or human-like. Mr. Zetes uses them as guards of the crystal.

=== The Fellowship ===
The Fellowship are the remaining members of an ancient race of psychics that lived before recorded human history. These members were able to predict the fall of this civilization and went to live in peace and simplicity in Canada. Their civilization used crystals, but unlike the crystal of Mr. Zetes, these crystals were pure and produced no bad side effects. These members have the last remaining pure crystal and are able to live hundreds of years, with the energy of the crystal sustaining them. They are pacifists and invite Kait and the others to live with them and hide from Mr. Zetes.

Members of the Fellowship include:

- LeShan is the member of the Fellowship that makes contact with Kait and tries to warn her of the dangers at the Zetes Institute. He is one of the younger members and is less set in the traditional ways of the Fellowship.
- Timon is one of the oldest members of the Fellowship and a default leader. He is resistant to change at first, but once he senses the evilness of the dark psychics, he realizes that some battles must be fought.
- Mereniang is another leader of the Fellowship (though she defers to Timon). She is the most set in the traditional ways of the Fellowship.
- Tamsin is one of the youngest members of the Fellowship. Her relative youth allows her to leave the protection of the crystal. She is sent as a messenger at times.
