= Newcomer =

Newcomer, or The Newcomer, may refer to:

== Literature ==
- Newcomer (新参者, Shinzanmono), a 2009 novel by Keigo Higashino
- The Newcomer, a 1966 novel by Hilda Pressley
- The Newcomer, a 2013 novel by Robyn Carr; the second installment in the Thunder Point series
- The Newcomer, a 2019 novel by Fern Britton
- The Newcomer, a 2021 novel by Mary Kay Andrews

== Places ==
- Newcomer (Lenape), chief of the western Lenape and founder of Newcomerstown, Ohio
- Newcomer, Missouri, a community in the United States

== Television ==
=== Episodes ===
- "The Newcomer", Fat Albert and the Cosby Kids season 2, episode 4 (1973)
- "The Newcomer", Walt Disney Presents: Annette episode 1 (1958)

=== Shows ===
- Shinzanmono (新参者, The Newcomer), a 2010 Japanese television drama

== Other uses ==
- Newcomer (surname)
- Novichok agent, Novichok meaning 'Newcomer' in Russian language

== See also ==
- The Newcomers (disambiguation)
- Newcomerstown, Ohio
- Neophyte (disambiguation)
- Newbie
- Novice
