= The Newcomers =

The Newcomers may refer to:

== Film ==
- The Newcomers, a 2000 family drama starring Matt McCoy, Kate Bosworth, Billy Kay and Paul Dano

== Literature ==
- The Newcomers, a 1917 novel by Elia W. Peattie
- The Newcomers: Negroes and Puerto Ricans in a Changing Metropolis, a 1959 non-fiction book by Oscar Handlin
- The Newcomers: Finding Refuge, Friendship, and Hope in an American Classroom, a 2017 non-fiction book by Helen Thorpe

== Television ==
=== Episodes ===
- "The Newcomers", Bonanza season 1, episode 3 (1959)
- "The Newcomers", Gunsmoke season 12, episode 11 (1966)
- "The Newcomers", Zorro (1990) season 1, episode 21 (1991)

=== Shows ===
- The Newcomers (TV series), a 1960s British soap opera aired by the BBC
- The Newcomers (TV miniseries), a 1970s Canadian television series aired by the CBC

== Other uses ==
- The Newcomers, the working title of the 1970 Disney film The Wild Country
- The Newcomers (ballet), a ballet by Miriam Mahdaviani
- Real Bout Fatal Fury 2: The Newcomers, a 1998 arcade fighting game by SNK

== See also ==
- The New Comers, a 1973 pornographic film
- Newcomer
- The Newcomes, a 1854–1855 novel by William Makepeace Thackeray
