= The Secret Circle =

Supernatural book series by L. J. Smith

- The Initiation; The Captive; The Power; The Divide; The Hunt; The Temptation
- Author: L. J. Smith (books 1–3); Aubrey Clark (books 4–6)
- Country: United States/Canada
- Language: English
- Genre: Fantasy, romance, young adult fiction
- Publisher: Harper Paperbacks
- Published: 1992 (books 1–3); 2012–2013 (books 4–6)
- Media type: Print (hardcover and paperback)

The Secret Circle is a supernatural, young-adult series of books created by L. J. Smith. The narrative follows the character of Cassie Blake as she is initiated into a "Circle" of eleven other teenage witches and the danger that ensues when they accidentally unleash a dark force upon their town. Matters are further complicated when Cassie finds herself in a love triangle that threatens to tear the Circle apart.

== Novels ==
1. The Initiation (1992) ISBN 978-0-06-106712-9
2. The Captive (1992) ISBN 978-0-06-106715-0
3. The Power (1992) ISBN 978-0-06-106719-8
4. The Divide (2012) ISBN 978-0-06-213039-6 (Written by Aubrey Clark)
5. The Hunt (2012) ISBN 978-0-06-213042-6 (Written by Aubrey Clark)
6. The Temptation (2013) ISBN 978-0-06-220596-4 (Written by Aubrey Clark)

=== Omnibuses ===
- The Initiation and The Captive Part I (2008) ISBN 978-0-06-167085-5
- The Captive Part II and The Power (2008) ISBN 978-0-06-167135-7

== Television adaptation ==
On October 28, 2010 L. J. Smith announced that the series had been optioned for a TV series by The CW. On February 27, 2011, The CW picked up The Secret Circle with Dawson's Creek creator and The Vampire Diaries co-creator/executive producer Kevin Williamson attached. However, Williamson told The CW that The Vampire Diaries' companion series he had been helming was put on hold as he did not have enough time for it. Williamson worked on an original script penned by Andrew Miller, creator of the Emmy-nominated web series Imaginary Bitches, with writer credit shared by both men. On February 16, 2011, The Secret Circle booked Liz Friedlander to direct the pilot. Friedlander also directed episodes for The Vampire Diaries, Pretty Little Liars, 90210 and One Tree Hill.

On September 15, 2011, The Secret Circle debuted on The CW following its sister series The Vampire Diaries.

On May 11, 2012, The CW cancelled the series. Several fan campaigns and petitions to ask the network to reconsider, to ship the show to another network or even to have a home video release of the series were unsuccessful.
