= Neophytus =

Neophytus or Neophytos (Greek: Νεόφυτος, "newly-planted, newcomer") may refer to:

- Neophytos of Nicaea, a Christian martyr
- Neophytus (freedman), an imperial freedman of emperor Nero
- Patriarch Neophytus I of Constantinople, Patriarch of Constantinople in 1153
- Patriarch Neophytus II of Constantinople, Patriarch of Constantinople in 1602–03 and 1607–12
- Patriarch Neophytus III of Constantinople, Patriarch of Constantinople in 1636–37
- Patriarch Neophytus IV of Constantinople, Patriarch of Constantinople in 1688
- Patriarch Neophytus V of Constantinople, Patriarch of Constantinople in 1707
- Patriarch Neophytus VI of Constantinople, Patriarch of Constantinople in 1734–40 and 1743–44
- Patriarch Neophytus VII of Constantinople, Patriarch of Constantinople in 1789–94 and 1798–1801
- Patriarch Neophytus VIII of Constantinople, Patriarch of Constantinople in 1891–94
- Neophytos of Cyprus (1134–1214), Cypriot monk and historian
- Neophytos Nasri (1670–1731), Melkite bishop
- Neophytos of Chios (died 1686), Orthodox Patriarch of Antioch in 1673–82
- Neophytos Doukas (1760–1845), Greek cleric and scholar
- Neophytos Vamvas (1770–1856), Greek cleric and educator
- Neophytos Larkou (born 1966), Cypriot football player

== See also ==
- Neophyte
- Neofit
