= The Novice (poem) =

Poem by Mikhail Lermontov

Mtsyri
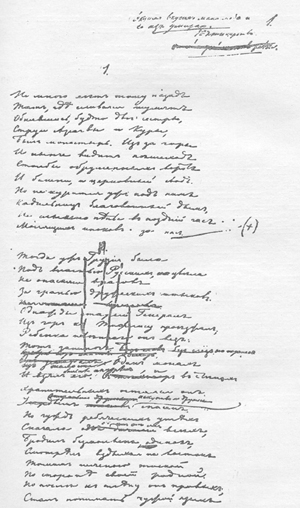
- The first page of the poem manuscript
- Author: Mikhail Lermontov
- Original title: Мцыри
- Language: Russian
- Genre: Poem
- Publication date: 1840
- Publication place: Russian Empire
- Media type: Print (hardback & paperback)

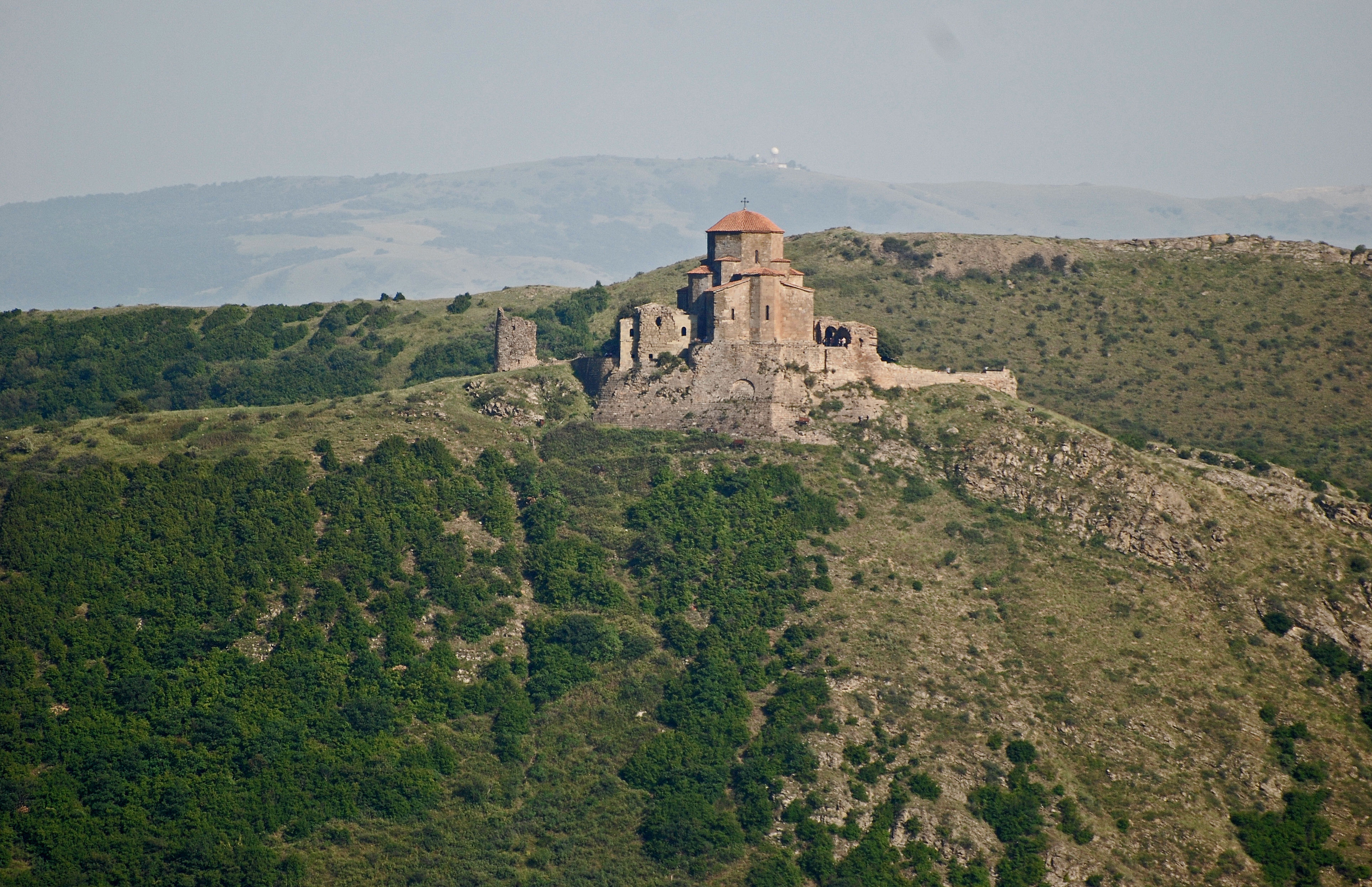
The Jvary monastery, the poem's alleged locale

The Novice ("Mtsyri", Мцыри in Russian) is a poem by Mikhail Lermontov written in 1839 and first published in 1840, hailed as "one of the last examples of the classic Russian romantic poetry," according to the Lermontov Encyclopedia.

== Background ==
Some Russian scholars (like S. Durylin) consider three poems – "The Confession", Boyarin Orsha and Mtsyry as three different executions of one original idea. In 1831 15-year-old Lermontov wrote in his diary: "To write the tale of a young 17-year old monk who's lived in a monastery from childhood. Read nothing but the sacred books. The passionate soul, he feels imprisoned..."

The poem's central episode, Mtsyri's fight with a wild cat was apparently based on the traditional Georgian folklore; there are 14 versions of the old Georgian song "Young Man and a Tiger", one of which (the Khevsur song) has been used by Shota Rustaveli in his epic poem The Knight in the Panther's Skin.

Citing the poet's relatives Akim Shan-Girey and Akim Khastatov, biographer Pavel Viskovatov suggested the following version of the poem's background:

While travelling along the old Georgian Military Road and collecting the local tales and legends (which later have been incorporated into the new version of the Demon poem), Lermontov in Mtskheta came across an old Beri, a Georgian monk, a guardian and the last surviving member of the local monastery that had been closed earlier. Lermontov had a conversation with him and learned that he was a highlander imprisoned by General Yermolov during the latter's Caucasian campaign. The boy fell ill and the general left him for local monks to take care for. Here he grew up but couldn't get used to his new home and made several attempts to escape. One such attempt proved to be all but fatal: he fell severely ill, nearly died and after that apparently submitted to his fate and even became friends with an elderly Georgian monk. This emotional tale impressed Lermontov. He used parts of his earlier poems, "The Confession" and Boyarin Orsha, merged them into one, added new details and took the story from Spain and (in case of Orsha) Lithuania to Georgia, making the best of this chance to extol the free and daring spirit of Caucasian highlanders he admired, and to praise the beauty of the Caucasian mountains that he loved.

Some scholars (I.Andronnikov, A.Lyubovich) later questioned the reliability of such version, others pointed out that taking away native Caucasian people's children was common practice for the Russian officers, and painter P.Z. Zakharov, an ethnic Chechen, has been brought to Tiflis personally by General Yermolov. Lermontov might have been aware of Zakharov's life drama, noted biographer L.N. Nazarova.

== History ==
The exact date of the poem's completion, according to the autograph, was August 5, 1839. According to the same manuscript, Mtsyri was called originally Beri (A Monk, in Georgian) and featured an epigraph ("On n'a qu'une seule patria", There is only one fatherland) which later had been crossed out by the author. It was this hand-written document that allowed researchers decades later to return into the poem two fragments cut out by censors. Those were the two lines from Verse 8 ("...To learn if it if for freedom or for prison that we are born into this world") and seven lines from the penultimate Verse 25 ("...But what's in it for me? Should my spirit finds itself in Paradise, this saintly heavenly place, I'd throw away both Paradise and the Eternity // For just one chance to spend several minutes among those dark steep rock where I used to play as a child".)
