= Coleman Independent School District =

School district in Texas

Address
- 2302 S Commercial Ave Coleman, Texas, 76834-0900; United States

District information
- Type: Public
- Grades: PK–12
- Superintendent: Brandon McDowell
- Governing agency: Texas Education Agency
- Schools: 3
- NCES District ID: 4814550

Students and staff
- Enrollment: 794 (2022–2023)
- Teachers: 70.39 (on an FTE basis)
- Student–teacher ratio: 11.28

Other information
- Website: www.colemanisd.net

Coleman Independent School District is a public school district based in Coleman, Texas (USA).

For the 2021-2022 school year, the school district was given a "B" by the Texas Education Agency.

In 2012, Novice ISD closed in the summer due to financial troubles, and formally consolidated with Coleman ISD on March 1, 2013.

== Schools ==
- Coleman High School (Grades 9-12) had 203 students for the 2022-23 school year and was built in 1975.
- Coleman Junior High School (Grades 5-8) had 252 students for the 2022-23 school year and was built in 1984.
- Coleman Elementary School (Grades PK-4) had 339 students for the 2022–23 school year.
