= Initiate (Mervyn Spence album) =

Studio album by O'Ryan
- Released: 1995
- Recorded: Parachute Studio Complex, The Music Station UK
- Genre: Pop rock, hard rock
- Length: 60:12
- Language: English
- Label: East Bell
- Producer: Mervyn Spence, Jason Fillingham

O'Ryan chronology
Something Strong (1993)	Initiate (1995)

Initiate is the second solo album by the Northern Irish singer Mervyn Spence, once again released under the pseudonym "O'Ryan", in 1995.

Initiate contains no original material, instead solely consisting of ten covers of various tracks from Tom Galley's Phenomena project (which Spence was involved with during its initial stages, and held the rights to at the time), and three re-recorded songs from Spence's debut album, Something Strong.

The recordings of "Still the Night", "Did It All for Love" and "No Retreat - No Surrender" found on Initiate would later be included on the Phenomena compilation boxset released in 2006, 'The Complete Works'.

In 2023, Cherry Red Records released a new version of the album, 'Phenomena Recovered', with 2 new covers of Phenomena songs, "Dance with the devil" and "Rock my soul".

Professional ratings
Review scores
Source	Rating

== Track listing ==
No.	Title	Writer(s)	Length
1.	"No Retreat - No Surrender" (Originally recorded by Phenomena)	Tom Galley, Mel Galley	4:15
2.	"Still the Night" (Originally recorded by Phenomena)	Glenn Hughes, Pat Thrall, Paul Delph	3:40
3.	"A Whole Lot of Love" (Originally recorded by Phenomena)	T. Galley, Leif Johansen	5:29
4.	"Believe" (Originally recorded by Phenomena)	T. Galley, Richard Bailey	5:38
5.	"Emer May"	Mervyn Spence, Dieter Petereit	6:01
6.	"Did It All for Love" (Originally recorded by Phenomena)	T. Galley, M. Galley	4:31
7.	"Something Strong"	Spence, Petereit	4:33
8.	"Shape It Up" (Originally recorded by Phenomena)	T. Galley, Johansen	3:59
9.	"What About Love" (Originally recorded by Phenomena)	T. Galley, Johansen	5:03
10.	"Phoenix Rising" (Originally recorded by Phenomena)	T. Galley, Bailey, M. Galley	4:43
11.	"Don't Let It Slip Away"	Spence, Petereit	4:54
12.	"It Must Be Love" (Originally recorded by Phenomena)	T. Galley, M. Galley	3:25
13.	"Stop!" (Originally recorded by Phenomena)	T. Galley, Bailey	3:56
Total length:			60:12

== Personnel ==
- Mervyn Spence - lead & backing vocals, bass programming, additional guitar
- Jason Fillingham - keyboards, drum programming
- Huwie Lucas - lead & rhythm guitars
- Martin Taylor - classical guitar
- "Midi Man" - drums
- Carl Brazil - percussion
- Tracey Riggan - backing vocals

=== Production personnel ===
- Mervyn Spence - production
- Jason Fillingham - production, engineering
- Simon Hanhart - mixing
