= Night World =

Series of fantasy novels by L. J. Smith

- Secret Vampire; Daughters of Darkness; Spellbinder; Dark Angel; The Chosen; Soulmate; Huntress; Black Dawn; Witchlight; Strange Fate (upcoming)
- Author: L. J. Smith
- Language: English
- Genre: Horror, Fantasy, Romance, young adult fiction
- Publisher: Simon & Schuster
- Published: 1996–1998, 2008–present
- Media type: Print (Hardcover & Paperback)

Night World is a series of nine young adult fantasy novels by American author L. J. Smith. In the series, vampires, witches, werewolves, and shape-shifters live among humans without their knowledge, making up a secret society known as the Night World. The society enforces two fundamental laws to prevent discovery: never allow humans to gain knowledge of the Night World's existence, and never fall in love with a human.

Each volume in the series follows a different teenage, female protagonist who must face challenges involving love, the "soulmate principle", and the Night World's strict code. In the first six novels, the plot focuses on the protagonist discovering her soulmate and the danger which ensues. In the seventh book of the series, the concept of an impending millennial apocalypse is introduced. The later books' plots focus on the search for four "Wild Powers" who, according to an ancient prophecy, will either save the world or aid in its destruction. Books from the series appeared on the New York Times Bestseller List for children's books in 2008 and 2009.

== Publishing history ==
The first nine books in the Night World series were originally published in 1996–1998 by Simon & Schuster. The release of the tenth and final book, Strange Fate, was put on hold when L.J. Smith took a hiatus from writing in 1999. In 2008, the nine Night World books were reprinted in three omnibus volumes. In some international reprints, edits were made in an attempt at modernisation, such as the replacement of the word "Walkman" with "iPod" in Daughters of Darkness. These edits were not made consistently: there are references to iPods on one page of a novel, followed by references to the previously used "Walkman" on the next page.

In February 2009, L.J. Smith shared via her Amazon blog that she couldn't give an exact release date for Strange Fate, estimating that it would be 1,000 to 1,200 pages long, she also described it as the "most complicated book" she had undertaken. In November 2024, Smith announced via her blog that the final book, Strange Fate, was in its final stages of editing, and that it would be released in two volumes, titled Mystic and Apocalypse respectively. On December 9, 2024, Smith shared further information on the book's plot and characters.

== Series summary ==
Each novel in the series features a male and female that discover that they are soulmates—beings connected by an unbreakable bond of love. Literature scholar Deborah Wilson Overstreet describes the so-called "soulmate principle" as "the main story line in each novel".

=== Secret Vampire ===
Poppy North, a regular teenage girl, is diagnosed with terminal pancreatic cancer. Her best friend and secret crush, James Rasmussen, reveals that his family are "lamia" (vampires by heritage) and that various supernatural creatures known as the "Night People", including vampires, werewolves and witches, have co-existed with humans for millennia. To save Poppy's life, he offers to convert her into a "made" vampire, even though Night World law states that humans may not learn of its existence, transform into a Night Person without permission from its Council, or - most importantly - have a relationship with an existing Night Person. Despite opposition from Poppy's brother Phil, who believes James is toying with her, James successfully makes Poppy a vampire and the two acknowledge that they are "soulmates", an ancient concept deemed nonsensical by modern Night People (and illegal via their laws). James hides Poppy in his apartment, but his "crazy" cousin Ash Redfern abducts her, intending to expose her as an illegal vampire at a gathering in Las Vegas. Poppy fights off Ash telepathically before James and Phil arrive to save her, making James realize Phil and Poppy must be descended from witches and therefore have every right to know of the Night World. Resolving to change their people's laws, James and Poppy leave to seek help from the latter's father, the source of the Norths' witch ancestry.

=== Daughters of Darkness ===
Lamia sisters Rowan, Kestrel and Jade Redfern have fled their homeland, a Night World island enclave, for Oregon. They plan to stay with their Aunt Opal, an earlier fugitive, only to find she has been killed. Opal's neighbor Mary-Lynnette Carter suspects the sisters of murder, but after she and her brother Mark find them eating a deer in the woods, they reveal their vampire heritage and convince her they are innocent. Instead of following Night World law by killing the Carters, the Redferns do a "blood-crossing" ceremony, binding the families in a vow of mutual protection - to the delight of Jade and Mark, who are convinced they are soulmates. The alliance enables Mary-Lynnette to help investigate the death of both Opal and various animals in the area.

Meanwhile, the Redferns' ruthless brother Ash has followed them to Oregon to either retrieve or kill them; however, when he meets Mary-Lynnette, the two realize to their joint horror that they are also soulmates. After learning about Opal, the shellshocked Ash agrees to assist in the investigation, though he and Mary-Lynnette insist they will not act on their feelings. Together, the group deduce Mary-Lynnette’s childhood friend Jeremy is a rogue werewolf, and after a meeting, he agrees to help them find the killer. Ash's revulsion towards humans slowly weakens, while Mary-Lynnette tries and fails to convince herself she hates him; finally, the two passionately acknowledge their shared feelings and begin the process to make Mary-Lynnette a vampire. However, Jeremy ambushes them in werewolf form, and reveals that he is the killer; he resented Opal for bringing three new vampires into his hunting territory, and when the Redferns wouldn't leave, he killed the animals to scare them off. He has also intended for some time to make Mary-Lynnette a werewolf, so sees Ash as a threat he must eliminate. Mary-Lynnette defends herself with a silver knife that Opal lent her, and Jeremy is killed when her faulty car explodes into flames.

Ash successfully fabricates a story that exonerates his sisters and allows them to stay in Oregon. Mary-Lynnette admits she loves him but is hesitant to become a vampire, and Ash vows to reflect on his wrongdoings to become worthy of her; they agree he will return to see her next year. As Ash leaves, his sisters and the Carters prepare to form a new haven for the Night People away from the enclaves.

=== Spellbinder (also published under the title Enchantress) ===
Witches Thea and Blaise Harman are first cousins. Thea uses white magic to heal and protect animals, while Blaise uses black magic to make boys do anything for her, including gifting her their possessions, harming themselves and others, and burning down buildings.

When the cousins start at a new school, Thea heals aspiring vet Eric Ross after he is bitten by a snake and feels an unexpected affinity with him; however, she flees when he guesses he was healed by magic. To keep seeing him without raising questions, Thea pretends she wants to seduce Eric herself so Blaise won't target him. At a school dance, one of Blaise's former victims bursts in and attacks her new admirers; to comfort Thea, Eric takes her to a pet hospital he works at, where Blaise finds them. Thea confesses her belief that they are soulmates; livid that a boy would resist her charms due to Thea and worried about her cousin breaking Night World law, Blaise vows to crush Eric's spirit and kill him. In a desperate attempt to protect Eric, Thea accidentally releases a vengeful spirit which kills one of Blaise's admirers. While trying to recapture it, she takes refuge at Eric's house, where he hints again that he believes she can cast spells; realizing she could land Eric in serious trouble, Thea attempts first to let Blaise seduce him, then to charm him to love another girl. Both plans fail, convincing Thea that the "soulmate principle" is real, and she tells Eric the truth about everything. He agrees to help her capture the spirit by luring it into a trap during a witches' covenant; however, the Circle of Witches is notified that Thea has cast forbidden spells, and she is summoned to answer for her wrongdoings. She eventually convinces them to let her complete her plan, and manages to return to Eric and banish the spirit before it kills him. Despite this, the Circle refuses to let Eric love Thea or retain his knowledge of the Night World, and Thea requests that they both drink from the Cup of Lethe, which will erase their memories and allow them to be together as humans; however, Thea realizes while drinking that Blaise had previously switched the drink with iced tea, so neither forgets anything. Circle member Aradia deduces this, but is willing to keep their secret; she tells Thea and Eric to find "Circle Daybreak", and Blaise accepts Thea's love for Eric as they part ways.

=== Dark Angel ===
Following what should have been a fatal accident, Gillian Lennox is resurrected by a beautiful being calling himself "Angel". He encourages her to alter her appearance, her behavior and her social circle, making her the most popular girl at school and uniting her with her long-time crush, David Blackburn. Angel's omniscience means Gillian is able to drive David away from his girlfriend Tanya, and that she swiftly learns of Tanya's subsequent vengeful plan to sabotage both her and David's reputations. Angel also reveals Gillian's heritage; she is descended from one of two lost babies from the Harman family, making her a witch, and with this insight he helps her create a spell to stop Tanya and her accomplice Kim from carrying out their plan. He guides her to a hidden Night World store to obtain supplies, earning disapproval from its witch storekeeper Melusine, who realizes Gillian will be using dark magic.

Everything seems perfect until Gillian learns her spell has made Tanya very sick. Angel's commands become stranger, more people end up hurt, and eventually he guides Gillian to an unsavory Night World clubhouse where she is almost mauled by werewolves; she is saved by Ash Redfern. Angel claims he and Gillian are soulmates, so he would never hurt her; however, when his influence almost causes David's death, Gillian blocks out Angel's voice and begs Melusine for help. Together they undo the spell against Tanya and Kim, and conclude that Angel is likely a spirit with unfinished business who died close to where Gillian met him. Before setting out to stop Angel, Gillian visits David in hospital and realizes he was her soulmate all along. She tries to find Angel in the local cemetery, and eventually he appears and takes her to his grave; his real name is Gary Fargeon, and he is descended from the other lost Harman baby, making him Gillian's second cousin. He has remained a spirit because he accidentally killed a young girl while casting an unstable spell, and died in a drunk-driving crash without telling anyone what he did. He denies Gillian's conviction that his actions don't make him evil, but eventually accepts the chance to atone for his actions; with David's help, Gillian leads the girl's father to where Gary hid her body, and when he states that he forgives whoever caused his daughter's death, Gary is finally able to move on to the afterlife.

=== The Chosen ===
Aged just five, Rashel Jordan witnesses the murder of her mother and her brother Timmy by a ruthless vampire, then survives a fire that kills her one remaining relative. She becomes a vampire hunter known as The Cat, determined to eliminate as many as possible until she finds her family's killer. While linking up with a hunting team in Boston, they and Rashel apprehend a cold-hearted "made" vampire named John Quinn, whom Rashel allows to escape after they have an unexpected empathetic connection, attracting fury from the other hunters.

After investigating a series of strange abductions in the area, Rashel sees a girl named Daphne escaping a truck; she helps her infiltrate an underground party which a group of vampires, including Quinn, are using to abduct young girls. Rashel and Daphne allow themselves to be captured and taken to an island, where they free the abductees from their werewolf bodyguards and help them escape. Rashel stays behind to find out who ordered the abductions but is attacked by one of the werewolves; she is saved by Quinn, who has concluded that their connection means they are soulmates, and attempts to turn her into a vampire to avoid breaking the law against loving a human. However, the process of exchanging blood allows each to see the other's past, and their mutual grief and new-found affection unites them against the Night World. They confront the vampires to whom the abducted girls were to be served as a "feast" - and discover that Quinn's guardian, the supposedly peaceful Hunter Redfern, is behind the abductions. Rashel instantly recognises him as her mother's killer, and learns that Timmy is not dead, but was turned into a vampire and raised by Hunter as a tormented eternal four-year-old. Nyala, a vengeful, unbalanced vampire hunter who followed Rashel, sets the building on fire, but Rashel and Quinn escape with Timmy, and at Rashel's pleading, Quinn returns to save Nyala. Rashel's rage towards vampires subsides, and she and Quinn decide to search for a rumored coven that accepts humans, Circle Daybreak.

=== Soulmate ===
Hannah Snow has been having nightmares and keeps finding notes written in her own handwriting warning her she will die before turning seventeen. She begins seeing psychologist Paul Winfield, and while undergoing a hypnosis-style treatment, she realizes is an "old soul"; she has lived many previous lives, all featuring both her soulmate Thierry Descouedres, a made vampire and a Lord of the Night World, and Thierry's arch-enemy Maya, who wants him for herself. In each of her lives, Hannah has been killed just before her seventeenth birthday

Hannah learns Maya was born a witch but longed to be immortal, so she became the world's first vampire through a spell that involved drinking the blood of four babies. Maya then turned Thierry into the first ever made vampire. At first, Hannah suspects Thierry is the one who always killed her in her past lives, but through another hypnotic episode, she realizes that it was Maya, who would shapeshift into Thierry's image to establish a pattern of him supposedly being the killer. Hannah goes to Thierry's house and meets the other members of Circle Daybreak, a group of humans, vampires, wolves, witches, and shapeshifters who are hoping for peace between Night World and the human race. Maya tracks down Hannah and attempts to turn her into a vampire and then kill her, thus ending her cycle of reincarnation; instead, Hannah manages to kill Maya. Hannah decides to remain human and live a mortal life, after which Thierry will wait for her to return in her next one.

=== Huntress ===
Jezabel "Jez" Redfern is proud of her lamia heritage, but one day a flashback makes her realize her mother was human, and her devastation makes her run away from her Uncle Bracken and her gang of human-hating vampire friends to live with her human relatives. She later learns about Circle Daybreak, and begins working with them as a vampire hunter to atone for her previous cruelty towards humans. However, she returns to her friends when Circle Daybreak asks her to go on a dangerous mission: to fight her worst enemy, best friend, and soulmate, Morgead Blackthorn, over control of the Wild Power. The Wild Powers are four prophesied beings with the ability to use blue fire.

It turns out that the person thought to be the Wild Power is a fake. Jez, her friend Hugh, and her annoying cousin Claire are attacked by two werewolves and a vampire. When she and Claire fall off the station platform onto the train tracks, Jez sees blue fire and thinks Claire is the one. When she, Claire, Hugh, and Morgead are captured by Lily Redfern, who is in search of the Wild Power, Jez figures out the meaning of the prophecy: she is one of the Wild Powers, and her blood must be spilled to release the blue fire. Lily stabs Morgead with a stake, and Morgead convinces Jez not to let go or give up. Jez admits Morgead is her soul mate, and Morgead survives.

=== Black Dawn ===
Maggie is a human who tries to rescue her brother from his girlfriend, a witch named Sylvia. Maggie stumbles upon an old Night World colony, where she meets vampire prince Delos Redfern, ruler of the Night World and one of the Wild Powers. Though he is cold toward her, he repeatedly saves her, each time stating that he will not help her again. The two soon learn that they are soulmates, though Delos refuses it and tells her to leave. Maggie does not, and sheremains in the Night World to find her brother.

Delos's great-grandfather, Hunter Redfern, arrives to take over the kingdom. Delos soon discovers that his powers are bound by a spell, and he cannot fight. Maggie finds out that her brother was turned into a shapeshifting falcon by Sylvia. Sylvia is killed by Hunter Redfern after she releases the spell binding Delos's powers. Hunter Redfern is presumably killed by Delos's use of blue fire. Maggie is happy to have found her brother and her soulmate. However, no one can rest yet, because the witches have seceded from the Night World Council, leading to war between vampires and witches. Two Wild Powers have been found, and both are now on the side of Circle Daybreak. Only two more remain.

=== Witchlight ===
Circle of Daybreak shapeshifter Raksha Keller and her team race to a mall to save the new Wild Power, Iliana Harman. Iliana is destined to marry Galen Drache, a shapeshifter of the first house, so the shapeshifters will side with the witches and not the vampires. But when Raksha learns that Galen is her soulmate, she realizes that their love could destroy the world.

Night World shapeshifters have been attacking humans, and they have also killed the Crone of the witches, Grandma Harman. Iliana's deaf friend, Jaime, is hosting a party, to be held on the same night as the ceremony that bonds the witches and shapeshifters. Iliana tries to use her powers to save Jaime when a car is going to hit her, but she can not activate the power. Based on that failure, Iliana assumes that she is not the Wild Power but agrees to pretend that she is the Wild Power so the ceremony can still go ahead. However, she says that she will only help if she can go to Jaime's party. Raksha and the people who are protecting Iliana agree and go with her to keep her safe from the Night World shapeshifters, particularly a dragon that can disguise itself as anyone it touches.

The night before the party, Raksha and Galen stay up looking through scrolls that contain writing only shapeshifters can read, trying to learn about the dragon. They find out that dragons have horns and that if you cut them all off, they can no longer shapeshift. They also find out accidentally that they are soulmates, but Raksha thinks they have to ignore it because he has to marry Iliana.

At the party, the dragon disguises itself as Jaime's brother Brett, lures Raksha into a room, and locks her in. She shapeshifts into a panther, jumps out the window, and reenters the party to try to find Iliana. The real Brett directs her to the basement, where Raksha finds a tunnel that leads her to her friends and Iliana, who is badly hurt. Raksha attacks the dragon, who was disguised as Jaime, and removes three out of the five horns. Galen who has never acquired a shape yet and wanted to be something small and peaceful turns into a leopard and removes another horn to save Raksha. Raksha sees her witch friend whisper something to Iliana, and Iliana stands up. She chants a spell and makes blue fire appear, which destroys the dragon while healing everyone else. Raksha and Galen find a way to be together and still unite the witches and shapeshifters: they need to do a blood cross between Iliana and Raksha.
