= Coleman High School (Texas) =

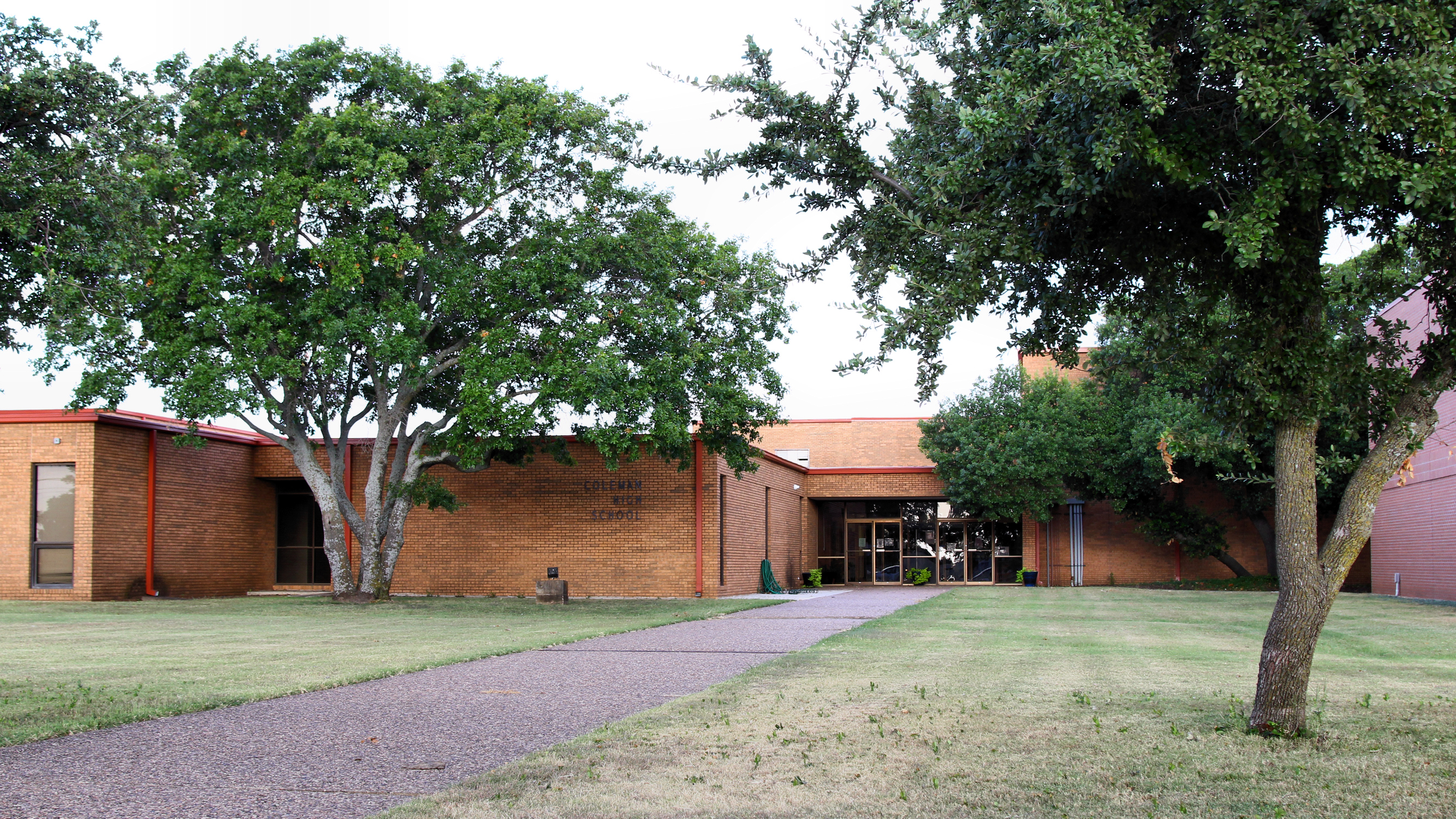

Location
- 201 West 15th Street; Coleman, Texas 76834-7211; United States; 31.809353°N 99.424648°W

Information
- School type: Public high school
- School district: Coleman Independent School District
- Principal: Diana Dobbins
- Teaching staff: 23.40 (FTE)
- Grades: 9-12
- Enrollment: 232 (2023–2024)
- Student to teacher ratio: 9.91
- Colors: Blue & White
- Athletics conference: UIL Class 2A
- Mascot: Bluecat/Bluekatts
- Website: Coleman High School

Coleman High School is a public high school located in Coleman, Texas (USA) and classified as a 2A school by the UIL. It is part of the Coleman Independent School District located in central Coleman County. For the 2021-2022 school year, the school was given a "B" by the Texas Education Agency.

In May 2012, the former Novice School closed due to financial troubles and formally consolidated with Coleman ISD on March 1, 2013.

== Athletics ==
The Coleman Bluecats compete in the following sports:

- Baseball
- Basketball
- Cross country
- Football
- Golf
- Powerlifting
- Softball
- Tennis
- Track and field

=== State titles ===
- Boys track
  - 2015(3A)
