= Novice Independent School District =

Defunct public school district in Texas, USA

District information
- Grades: PreK–12
- Closed: March 1, 2013 (absorbed by Coleman Independent School District)
- Schools: 1

Novice Independent School District was a public school district based in Novice, Texas (USA).

Located in Coleman County, a small portion of the district extended into Runnels County.

Novice ISD had one school that served students in grades pre-kindergarten through twelve.

In 2009, the school district was rated "academically unacceptable" by the Texas Education Agency.

In May, 2012, it celebrated its 100th graduating class, but closed that summer due to financial troubles, and formally consolidated with Coleman ISD on March 1, 2013. The last time two school districts in the Abilene, Texas area, or the "Big Country", had consolidated was the 2005 merger of the Haskell Independent School District and the Rochester Independent School District; the latter was absorbed into the former. Three of five Novice ISD board members voted to end the district. The board chose to consolidate with Coleman ISD, while initially considering Jim Ned Independent School District.
