= Wingate, Texas =

Census-designated place in Texas, US

Wingate is an unincorporated community and census-designated place in Runnels County, Texas, United States. As of the 2020 census, Wingate had a population of 83.

== Geography ==
Wingate is located at 32°02′44″N 100°06′15″W. It is situated along FM 53 in northwestern Runnels County, about 13 miles northwest of Winters and 54 miles southwest of Abilene.

=== Climate ===
According to the Köppen climate classification, Wingate has a humid subtropical climate, Cfa on climate maps. The hottest temperature recorded in Wingate was 110 °F (43.3 °C) on May 24, 2000, and May 29, 2011, while the coldest temperature recorded was −6 °F (−21.1 °C) on February 16, 2021.

Climate data for Wingate, Texas, 1991–2020 normals, extremes 1968–present
Month	Jan	Feb	Mar	Apr	May	Jun	Jul	Aug	Sep	Oct	Nov	Dec	Year
Record high °F (°C)	87 (31)	95 (35)	95 (35)	100 (38)	110 (43)	112 (44)	109 (43)	108 (42)	109 (43)	103 (39)	97 (36)	89 (32)	112 (44)
Mean maximum °F (°C)	77.8 (25.4)	82.5 (28.1)	87.7 (30.9)	93.5 (34.2)	98.9 (37.2)	100.4 (38.0)	102.1 (38.9)	102.3 (39.1)	97.4 (36.3)	92.1 (33.4)	83.2 (28.4)	78.2 (25.7)	104.5 (40.3)
Mean daily maximum °F (°C)	57.6 (14.2)	61.8 (16.6)	69.5 (20.8)	78.3 (25.7)	85.2 (29.6)	91.6 (33.1)	95.1 (35.1)	94.7 (34.8)	87.8 (31.0)	78.3 (25.7)	66.6 (19.2)	58.4 (14.7)	77.1 (25.0)
Daily mean °F (°C)	42.5 (5.8)	46.8 (8.2)	54.6 (12.6)	63.0 (17.2)	71.6 (22.0)	78.6 (25.9)	81.7 (27.6)	81.2 (27.3)	74.3 (23.5)	63.9 (17.7)	52.5 (11.4)	43.9 (6.6)	62.9 (17.2)
Mean daily minimum °F (°C)	27.4 (−2.6)	31.7 (−0.2)	39.7 (4.3)	47.6 (8.7)	58.0 (14.4)	65.5 (18.6)	68.4 (20.2)	67.6 (19.8)	60.9 (16.1)	49.6 (9.8)	38.3 (3.5)	29.3 (−1.5)	48.7 (9.3)
Mean minimum °F (°C)	16.2 (−8.8)	19.2 (−7.1)	24.6 (−4.1)	33.2 (0.7)	44.9 (7.2)	58.7 (14.8)	65.1 (18.4)	63.2 (17.3)	49.6 (9.8)	35.9 (2.2)	24.6 (−4.1)	18.3 (−7.6)	13.1 (−10.5)
Record low °F (°C)	−5 (−21)	−6 (−21)	8 (−13)	24 (−4)	34 (1)	48 (9)	55 (13)	54 (12)	39 (4)	19 (−7)	15 (−9)	−5 (−21)	−6 (−21)
Average precipitation inches (mm)	1.07 (27)	1.37 (35)	1.93 (49)	1.84 (47)	3.13 (80)	3.20 (81)	1.76 (45)	2.14 (54)	3.00 (76)	3.06 (78)	1.42 (36)	1.07 (27)	24.99 (635)
Average snowfall inches (cm)	0.2 (0.51)	0.4 (1.0)	0.0 (0.0)	0.1 (0.25)	0.0 (0.0)	0.0 (0.0)	0.0 (0.0)	0.0 (0.0)	0.0 (0.0)	0.0 (0.0)	0.4 (1.0)	0.3 (0.76)	1.4 (3.52)
Average precipitation days (≥ 0.01 in)	3.9	4.1	5.8	4.0	6.5	5.8	4.0	5.0	5.1	5.4	4.2	4.1	57.9
Average snowy days (≥ 0.1 in)	0.1	0.3	0.0	0.0	0.0	0.0	0.0	0.0	0.0	0.0	0.3	0.3	1.0
Source 1: NOAA
Source 2: National Weather Service

== History ==
The area was initially settled by several pioneer families in the early 1890s. A school opened in 1891 and a post office was established on March 14, 1892. The community was named after Ballinger attorney W.J. Wingate. By the 1920s, Wingate had a bank and several other businesses. A new high school was constructed around the same time. In 1940, Wingate had an estimated population of 250. A modest buffalo-ranching industry was launched by Vester Parrish in 1961. Wingate's population stood at just over 200 in 1990. On July 1, 1991, the Wingate Independent School District was annexed into Winters ISD. By 2000, roughly 132 residents were living in Wingate.

Wingate has a post office with the zip code of 79566.

== Demographics ==
Historical population
Census	Pop.	Note	%±
2020	83		—
U.S. Decennial Census; 1850–1900 1910; 1920 1930 1940; 1950 1960 1970; 1980 1990 2000; 2010 2020

Wingate first appeared as a census designated place in the 2020 U.S. census.

=== 2020 census ===
Wingate CDP, Texas – Racial and ethnic composition Note: the US Census treats Hispanic/Latino as an ethnic category. This table excludes Latinos from the racial categories and assigns them to a separate category. Hispanics/Latinos may be of any race.
Race / Ethnicity (NH = Non-Hispanic)	Pop 2020	% 2020
White alone (NH)	54	65.06%
Asian alone (NH)	1	1.20%
Native Hawaiian or Pacific Islander alone (NH)	0	0.00%
Other race alone (NH)	0	0.00%
Multiracial (NH)	4	4.82%
Hispanic or Latino (any race)	24	28.92%
Total	83	100.00%

== Education ==
Public education in the community of Wingate is provided by the Winters Independent School District.
