= List of United States tornadoes from January to March 1982 =

This is a list of all tornadoes that were confirmed by the National Climatic Data Center in the United States from January to March 1982. During this period, 81 tornadoes touched down across 23 states, resulting in 7 fatalities and numerous injuries. The strongest of these storms was an F4 in the Texas and Oklahoma Panhandles on March 18. Activity greatly varied between the three months, with January being above average, February at record low levels and March around average. Aside from two notable outbreaks, tornado events were sporadic and scattered across the country. More than half of the 60 tornadoes in March occurred during a single outbreak from March 14 to 17.

== United States yearly total ==
Confirmed tornadoes by Fujita rating
| FU | F0 | F1 | F2 | F3 | F4 | F5 | Total |
|---|---|---|---|---|---|---|---|
| 0 | 373 | 421 | 187 | 58 | 6 | 1 | 1047 |

== January ==
Confirmed tornadoes by Fujita rating
| FU | F0 | F1 | F2 | F3 | F4 | F5 | Total |
|---|---|---|---|---|---|---|---|
| 0 | 3 | 8 | 6 | 1 | 0 | 0 | 18 |

January 1982 tornadoes
| Date | State | F# | County | Coord. | Path length | Comments/Damage |
|---|---|---|---|---|---|---|
| January 3, 1982 | Mississippi | F3 | Newton | 32.25°N 89.17°W | 11 miles (18 km) | 1 death – First killer January tornado since 1978. Along the tornado's path, 20 homes were destroyed and 40 structures were damaged. Seventeen people sustained injuries. Total damage from the tornado reached $2 million. Location was the Newton, Mississippi area. |
| January 3, 1982 | Alabama | F2 | Chilton, Coosa | 32.75°N 86.52°W | 15 miles (24 km) | Five mobile homes and two gas station were destroyed near southeast of Clanton, Alabama near Lake Mitchell. Originally believed to be two separate tornadoes, later analysis found that the tornado had an intermittent 15 miles (24 km) track through two counties. |
| January 3, 1982 | Alabama | F2 | Autauga, Chilton | 32.68°N 86.57°W | 8 miles (13 km) | In Lily Hill, southeast of Clanton, Alabama, a house was blown away, injuring four occupants. The tornado tracked over the same area the previous one did, forcing rescuers to take shelter. A total of six people were injured by the tornado. |
| January 3, 1982 | Alabama | F1 | Autauga | 32.67°N 86.52°W | 1 mile (1.6 km) | Brief tornado touched down near Interstate 65 southeast of Clanton, Alabama, downing trees and power lines. Four cars sustained damage from debris. |
| January 3, 1982 | Alabama | F1 | Chilton | 32.83°N 86.65°W | 0.1 miles (0.16 km) | Brief tornado in the Clanton, Alabama area injured four people. |
| January 3, 1982 | Alabama | F2 | Cullman | 34.22°N 86.73°W | 0.5 miles (0.80 km) | Brief touchdown near Simcoe, Alabama; a gas station, mini-mart and trailer were destroyed. |
| January 3, 1982 | Alabama | F2 | Marshall | 34.35°N 86.45°W | 3 miles (4.8 km) | Tornado touched down along Alabama State Route 69 northeast of Arab, Alabama and tore the roof off a home. One person was injured. |
| January 3, 1982 | Alabama | F1 | Monroe | 31.52°N 87.33°W | 1 mile (1.6 km) | Brief touchdown near Monroeville, Alabama. |
| January 3, 1982 | Arkansas | F0 | Lee | 34.8°N 90.67°W | 0.1 miles (160 m) | Brief touchdown east-northeast of Marianna, Arkansas. |
| January 3, 1982 | Arkansas | F1 | Phillips | 34.52°N 90.58°W | 0.1 miles (160 m) | Brief touchdown in Helena, Arkansas. |
| January 4, 1982 | Georgia | F1 | Cherokee | 34.32°N 84.42°W | 0.1 miles (0.16 km) | Brief touchdown northeast of Cherokee County Airport near Georgia State Route 515. |
| January 7, 1982 | Alabama | F1 | Houston | 31.2°N 85.32°W | 1 mile (1.6 km) | Brief touchdown near Cowarts, Alabama. |
| January 14, 1982 | Florida | F1 | Lee | 26.52°N 81.6°W | 1 mile (1.6 km) | Brief touchdown near Lehigh Acres, Florida. Several homes were damaged along the tornado's path, leaving $300,000 in losses. |
| January 14, 1982 | Florida | F0 | Hendry | 26.63°N 81.43°W | 1 mile (1.6 km) | Brief touchdown east-northeast of Lehigh Acres, Florida. |
| January 20, 1982 | California | F0 | Riverside | 33.95°N 117.4°W | 0.1 miles (0.16 km) | Brief touchdown in downtown Riverside, California. The tornado felled several trees, tore the roof off a home and injured one person. |
| January 22, 1982 | Arkansas | F2 | Garland | 34.5°N 93.05°W | 2 miles (3.2 km) | Small tornado struck Hot Springs, Arkansas, damaging several homes and injuring one person. |
| January 23, 1982 | Mississippi | F1 | Lauderdale | 34.5°N 93.05°W | 0.1 miles (0.16 km) | Brief tornado touched down southeast of Collinsville, Mississippi. |
| January 30, 1982 | Louisiana | F2 | Assumption | 29.98°N 91.07°W | 3 miles (4.8 km) | Brief tornado touched southwest of Paincourtville, Louisiana. One person was injured by the tornado. |

== February ==
Confirmed tornadoes by Fujita rating
| FU | F0 | F1 | F2 | F3 | F4 | F5 | Total |
|---|---|---|---|---|---|---|---|
| 0 | 0 | 1 | 2 | 0 | 0 | 0 | 3 |

February 1982 tornadoes
| Date | State | F# | County | Coord. | Path length | Comments/Damage |
|---|---|---|---|---|---|---|
| February 11, 1982 | Hawaii | F2 | Honolulu | 21.33°N 157.72°W | 0.1 miles (0.16 km) | Brief tornado touched down south of Waimānalo, Hawai'i. Occurred simultaneously with the Maunawili tornado. Nearly 24 homes sustained damage. |
| February 11, 1982 | Hawaii | F2 | Honolulu | 21.37°N 157.77°W | 0.1 miles (0.16 km) | Brief tornado touched down near Maunawili, Hawai'i. Occurred simultaneously with the Waimānalo tornado. |
| February 17, 1982 | Florida | F1 | Manatee | 27.52°N 82.55°W | 1 mile (1.6 km) | Brief tornado touched down near Palmetto, Florida, damaging 12 mobile homes and a lumber yard. One home had its roof torn off and thrown 30 yards (27 m) away. Losses in the lumber yard were estimated at $30,000 to $50,000. |

== March ==
Confirmed tornadoes by Fujita rating
| FU | F0 | F1 | F2 | F3 | F4 | F5 | Total |
|---|---|---|---|---|---|---|---|
| 0 | 9 | 23 | 20 | 7 | 1 | 0 | 60 |

March 1982 tornadoes
| Date | State | F# | County | Coord. | Path length | Comments/Damage |
|---|---|---|---|---|---|---|
| March 6, 1982 | Florida | F0 | Pinellas | 27.75°N 82.68°W | 3 miles (4.8 km) | Brief tornado touched down in St. Petersburg, Florida. |
| March 6, 1982 | Florida | F1 | Miami-Dade | 25.6°N 80.4°W | 10 miles (16 km) | Roughly 100 homes and 500 vehicles sustained damage in Kendall, Florida. Four people were injured in the city. Losses from the tornado were estimated over $500,000. |
| March 6, 1982 | Florida | F1 | Highlands | 27.42°N 81.42°W | 1 mile (1.6 km) | Brief tornado touched down north-northwest of Lake Placid, Florida. |
| March 7, 1982 | Florida | F1 | Volusia | 29.12°N 81.33°W | 0.1 miles (0.16 km) | Brief tornado touched down east of DeLeon Springs, Florida, downing trees and power lines. A few homes sustained damage from flying debris. |
| March 12, 1982 | Illinois | F2 | McDonough | 40.33°N 90.68°W | 0.1 miles (0.16 km) | Brief tornado touched down south of Macomb, Illinois, injuring one person. |
| March 13, 1982 | Ohio | F1 | Fairfield | 39.75°N 82.6°W | 2 miles (3.2 km) | Brief tornado touched down south of Lancaster, Ohio. Twelve outbuildings and one home were destroyed. |
| March 14, 1982 | Texas | F1 | Taylor | 32.28°N 99.82°W | 0.1 miles (0.16 km) | A restaurant in Buffalo Gap, Texas, was heavily damaged. |
| March 14, 1982 | Texas | F2 | Runnels, Taylor | 32.07°N 99.92°W | 11 miles (18 km) | First of two tornadoes that struck near Winters, Texas (north-northeast), this tornado moving toward Lawn, Texas. Five homes, a swath of farmland and an oil derrick were destroyed along its path. |
| March 14, 1982 | Texas | F3 | Runnels, Coleman, Taylor, Callahan | 31.87°N 100.15°W | 41 miles (66 km) | Second tornado that passed near Winters, Texas, toward east of Lawn, Texas. Several barns and farming equipment were destroyed in this area. The community of Goldsboro sustained significant damage; one home was mostly destroyed in this area. The tornado also flattened an oil rig. A 25 yd (23 m) section of asphalt was torn off Highway 382. Fourteen people were injured by the tornado. Total losses reached $3 million. |
| March 14, 1982 | Texas | F1 | Callahan, Eastland | 32.12°N 99.15°W | 5 miles (8.0 km) | Short-lived tornado touched down near Cross Plains, Texas. |
| March 14, 1982 | Texas | F1 | Dallas | 32.62°N 96.93°W | 2 miles (3.2 km) | A brief tornado damaged 18 homes in the Dallas suburb of Duncanville, Texas. |
| March 15, 1982 | Alabama | F1 | Calhoun | 33.78°N 85.88°W | 8 miles (13 km) | Alexandria, Alabama area |
| March 15, 1982 | Kansas | F2 | Greenwood | 37.67°N 96.07°W | 2 miles (3.2 km) | Brief tornado damaged 25 cabins and trailers north-northwest of Fall River, Kansas. |
| March 15, 1982 | Kansas | F2 | Woodson, Allen | 37.78°N 95.85°W | 30 miles (48 km) | Long-tracked tornado damaged numerous homes, however, specifics are unknown. Southeast of Toronto, Kansas to Colony, Kansas |
| March 15, 1982 | Kansas | F3 | Montgomery | 37.02°N 95.85°W | 6 miles (9.7 km) | 1 death – One person was killed and another injured when the tornado destroyed their trailer. Intensity is disputed to be F2 rather than F3 by Grazulis. In the Tyro, Kansas area. |
| March 15, 1982 | Kansas | F1 | Montgomery | | 0.1 miles (0.16 km) | |
| March 15, 1982 | Kansas | F2 | Labette, Crawford | | 17 miles (27 km) | Relatively long-tracked tornado destroyed two trailers and damaged several other homes. Three people were injured in the trailers. |
| March 15, 1982 | Kansas | F3 | Crawford, Barton (MO), Vernon (MO), Cedar (MO), St. Clair (MO) | | 70 miles (110 km) | 2 deaths – 8 others injured |
| March 15, 1982 | Kansas | F3 | Labette, Cherokee | | 30 miles (48 km) | 1 death – 6 others injured |
| March 15, 1982 | Kansas | F0 | Cherokee | | 0.1 miles (0.16 km) | |
| March 15, 1982 | Kansas | F3 | Crawford, Jasper (MO) | | 9 miles (14 km) | |
| March 15, 1982 | Oklahoma | F1 | Seminole | | 0.1 miles (0.16 km) | |
| March 15, 1982 | Oklahoma | F3 | Pontotoc | | 6 miles (9.7 km) | 1 death – 36 others injured |
| March 15, 1982 | Oklahoma | F2 | Hughes | | 0.1 miles (0.16 km) | |
| March 15, 1982 | Oklahoma | F2 | Osage | | 0.1 miles (0.16 km) | 1 person injured |
| March 15, 1982 | Oklahoma | F1 | Osage | | 0.1 miles (0.16 km) | |
| March 15, 1982 | Oklahoma | F1 | Washington | | 0.1 miles (0.16 km) | |
| March 15, 1982 | Oklahoma | F2 | Washington | | 3 miles (4.8 km) | 57 people injured |
| March 15, 1982 | Oklahoma | F2 | Nowata | | 12 miles (19 km) | |
| March 15, 1982 | Oklahoma | F2 | Nowata | | 0.1 miles (0.16 km) | |
| March 15, 1982 | Oklahoma | F1 | Haskell | | 0.1 miles (0.16 km) | |
| March 15, 1982 | Missouri | F3 | Benton | | 14 miles (23 km) | 1 person injured |
| March 15, 1982 | Missouri | F2 | Morgan | | 5 miles (8.0 km) | |
| March 15, 1982 | Missouri | F1 | Moniteau | | 5 miles (8.0 km) | |
| March 15, 1982 | Missouri | F0 | Callaway | | 24 miles (39 km) | Long-tracked weak tornado |
| March 16, 1982 | Kentucky | F2 | Clark, Powell | | 8 miles (13 km) | A tornado destroyed eight homes and many outbuildings along its path from Trapp, Kentucky, to Black Creek, Kentucky. Two people were injured. |
| March 16, 1982 | Indiana | F1 | Wells, Adams | | 9 miles (14 km) | |
| March 17, 1982 | Georgia | F0 | Fulton | 33.77°N 84.4°W | 0.1 miles (0.16 km) | Brief tornado struck downtown Atlanta, Georgia, just south of the Georgia Institute of Technology. One office building sustained some exterior damage. |
| March 17, 1982 | California | F0 | San Diego | 32.73°N 117.18°W | 0.1 miles (0.16 km) | Small tornado briefly touched down along the southeast end of San Diego International Airport's runway. |
| March 18, 1982 | Hawaii | F2 | Honolulu | 21.5°N 158.03°W | 0.1 miles (0.16 km) | Brief tornado touched down near Wahiawā, Hawai'i. |
| March 18, 1982 | Kansas | F2 | Seward | 37.12°N 100.98°W | 0.1 miles (0.16 km) | Northwest of Liberal, Kansas. |
| March 18, 1982 | Kansas | F2 | Haskell, Gray | 37.43°N 100.95°W | 48 miles (77 km) | Satanta area to Cimarron area |
| March 18, 1982 | New Mexico | F0 | Curry | 34.47°N 103.07°W | 0.1 miles (0.16 km) | Brief tornado touched down northeast of Clovis, New Mexico. |
| March 18, 1982 | Texas | F4 | Moore, Hansford, Ochiltree, Beaver (OK) | 36.02°N 101.73°W | 88 miles (142 km) | Long-lived 0.5 mi (800 m) wide tornado tracked through the northern Texas Panhandle into the Oklahoma Panhandle shortly before midnight (local time), starting near Sunray, Texas and ending near Beaver, Oklahoma. At least 12 farms in Hansford County and four homes in Beaver County were destroyed. Twelve people were injured by the tornado and losses exceeded $1 million. |
| March 19, 1982 | Iowa | F1 | Taylor | | 2 miles (3.2 km) | |
| March 20, 1982 | Tennessee | F1 | Sumner | 36.62°N 86.45°W | 0.1 miles (0.16 km) | Northeast of Portland, Tennessee |
| March 20, 1982 | Kentucky | F2 | Shelby | 38.22°N 85.23°W | 1 mile (1.6 km) | 8 people injured. In Shelbyville, Kentucky area. |
| March 20, 1982 | Kentucky | F2 | Shelby, Franklin | 38.12°N 84.45°W | 20 miles (32 km) | South-southeast of Shelbyville, Kentucky to Frankfort, Kentucky |
| March 20, 1982 | Arkansas | F0 | Lincoln | 37.78°N 95.85°W | 0.1 miles (0.16 km) | Brief tornado touched down near or on the Arkansas River north of Grady, Arkansas. |
| March 28, 2018 | California | F1 | Fresno | 36.57°N 119.62°W | 5 miles (8.0 km) | 1 person injured. In the Selma, California area. |
| March 29, 1982 | Florida | F1 | Palm Beach | 26.62°N 80.05°W | 0.1 miles (0.16 km) | 1 person injured in the Lake Worth, Florida area. |
| March 29, 1982 | Utah | F0 | Beaver | 38.5°N 112.88°W | 0.1 miles (0.16 km) | First March tornado in Utah since 1907, touched down well to the northeast of Milford, Utah. |
| March 29, 1982 | California | F0 | Alameda | 37.68°N 121.77°W | 0.1 miles (0.16 km) | In Livermore, California area. |
| March 29, 1982 | California | F1 | Los Angeles | 34.08°N 118.1°W | 2 miles (3.2 km) | In San Gabriel, California area. |
| March 29, 1982 | South Dakota | F2 | Bennett | 43.17°N 101.95°W | 0.1 miles (0.16 km) | Touched down west of Martin, South Dakota. A mobile home was picked up by the tornado and one of its occupants was thrown out of the building; however, he was unharmed. The other person in the home sustained minor injuries. |
| March 30, 1982 | Wisconsin | F1 | Juneau, Wood, Portage | 44.2°N 90°W | 28 miles (45 km) | Long-lived intermittent tornado made several touchdowns along a 28 miles (45 km) path through central Wisconsin, from southeast of Nekoosa, Wisconsin to Stevens Point, Wisconsin. Numerous trees were felled by the tornado, one of which fell on a mobile home and destroyed it. The two occupants of the home sustained extensive injuries. Nearby, another mobile home was destroyed and a house was moved off its foundation. Due to the intermittent nature of the tornado, newspaper reports initially stated it to have been a series of tornadoes rather than a single one. |
| March 30, 1982 | Illinois | F2 | Jefferson | 38.15°N 88.9°W | 0.8 miles (1.3 km) | 1 death – Short-lived but damaging tornado touched down near Ina, Illinois. Five trailers and four homes were destroyed, one of which was blown off its foundation and thrown into another. Sixteen other homes and several trailers sustained damage. Three people were also injured and losses were estimated at $1 million. |
| March 30, 1982 | Illinois | F1 | Hamilton | 38.25°N 88.47°W | 0.1 miles (0.16 km) | Brief tornado touched down east-southeast of Mayberry, Illinois. |
| March 31, 1982 | Louisiana | F1 | Washington | 30.97°N 90.1°W | 12 miles (19 km) | Tornado touched down due west of Angie, Louisiana and tracked eastward for 12 miles (19 km) before dissipating. No known damage took place during the tornado's existence. |
| March 31, 1982 | Ohio | F2 | Knox | 40.4°N 82.48°W | 0.75 miles (1.21 km) | Brief tornado destroyed four homes and heavily damaged seven others in Mt. Vernon, Ohio. Seven people were injured in the town. The tornado was roughly 660 yards (600 m) wide and struck less than three hours after a statewide tornado drill. According to residents, there was no warning issued before the tornado struck. In the wake of the tornado, 15 national guardsmen were deployed to patrol the area and prevent vandalism. |
