= Olfen Independent School District =

School district in Texas

Olfen Independent School District is a public school district based in Rowena, Texas (USA).

Located in south central Runnels County, the district has one school that serves students from pre-kindergarten (pre-K) to eighth grade.

In 2009, the school district was rated "academically acceptable" by the Texas Education Agency.

In 2016 the district began making Fridays attendance optional.
