= Olde Park Hotel =

Hotel in Texas, United States

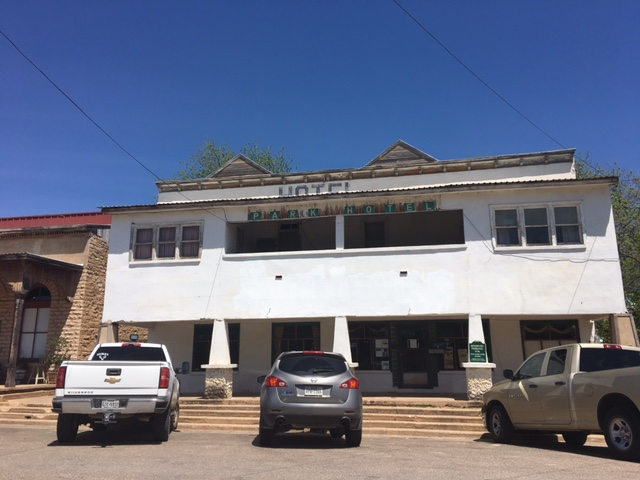

- Location within Texas

General information
- Type: Hotel
- Location: Runnels County, 107 S. 6th Street, Ballinger, Texas, United States
- Coordinates: 31.7392°N 99.9451°W
- Construction started: c. 1886

Website
- www.oldeparkhotel.com

The Olde Park Hotel is a bed and breakfast and tourist attraction located in Ballinger, Texas. Today's the Olde Park Hotel has seen various uses such as a schoolhouse, saloon, and hotel over its history but is today a bed and breakfast and event venue owned by the LaFave family.

== History ==
The Olde Park Hotel, standing where it has since before Ballinger existed, was built as a bunkhouse for railroad workers, but was sold in an auction in July 1886.

In the hotel's life, it has been a schoolhouse, a hotel, and a saloon.

== Architecture ==
The building has been enlarged a few times in its history. One expansion was moved to Ballinger on logs from nearby Runnels City, and it is believed that another part of the building was once briefly used as Runnels's courthouse.

== Purported haunting ==
The hotel is considered to be haunted and marketed as such. One previous owner, Jeanette Findlay, has reportedly identified 30 different entities present in the hotel. The hotel's reputation has resulted in its periodically appearing in paranormal television programming. The hotel was visited in 2018 by Brad and Barry Klinge, hosts Ghost Lab, and Brandy Green of Ghost Hunters International, and in 2019 by paranormal investigator and actor Chad Lindberg. The hotel is to be featured in the Travel Channel television show Fright Club, hosted by Jack Osbourne.
