= Randy Allen (American football) =

American football player and coach

Current position
- Title: Head coach
- Team: Highland Park HS (TX)
- Record: 319–41

Biographical details
- Born: c. 1950 (age 75–76); Abilene, Texas, U.S.
- Education: Southern Methodist University and Texas A&M

Playing career
- 1969–1972: SMU
- Position: Tailback

Coaching career (HC unless noted)
- 1973–1980: Bryan HS (TX) (assistant)
- 1981–1985: Ballinger HS (TX)
- 1986–1990: Brownwood HS (TX)
- 1991–1998: Abilene Cooper HS (TX)
- 1999–present: Highland Park HS (TX)

Head coaching record
- Overall: 472–100–6

Randy Allen (born c. 1950) is an American high school football coach. He is the head football coach at Highland Park High School in Dallas, Texas, and is the winningest active high school football coach in Texas with 472 victories through the end of the 2025 season. He is currently second in victories to retired coach Phil Danaher who has 490 wins.

== Playing career ==
A native of Abilene, Texas, Allen attended 1960's football powerhouse Abilene Cooper High School. With Allen at tailback and slotback, Cooper made it to the 1967 state final against Austin Reagan at Fort Worth's Amon G. Carter Stadium, but lost 20-19 after two controversial last-second decisions by the officials. After graduating in 1968, Allen went on to play at Southern Methodist University in Dallas for coach Hayden Fry.

== Coaching career ==
Allen's first coaching was at Bryan High School as an assistant under his former high school football coach, Merrill Green. Eight years later, Allen landed his first head coaching job at Ballinger High School. Ballinger had not had a winning season in five years prior to Allen's arrival. The Bearcats compiled a 44–15–2 record under Allen the following five years.

In 1986, Allen was selected to succeed Gordon Wood at Brownwood High School. Facing enormous expectations, Allen managed to compile a 43–13–2 record in five seasons. In 1991, he chose to return to his alma mater Abilene Cooper, which had gone 1–9 in 1990. In 1996, Allen guided the Cougars to their first state final appearance since 1967 - a game in which Allen played in. Cooper lost 55-15 to Austin Westlake, led by Drew Brees.

Leaving Abilene in 1999, Allen became head coach at Highland Park High School in Dallas. With Allen as head coach, Highland Park had 10+ win seasons every year, except in 2004 when they finished 8-2. In 2005, Highland Park went undefeated for the first time in school history. They won the 4A state title for the first time in 48 years. Led by quarterback Matthew Stafford, the Scots defeated Marshall 59-0.

On October 14, 2011, Allen became the 10th man in Texas high school football history to coach his teams to 300 wins with Highland Park's 41-27 win over JJ Pearce High School.

Highland Park became the first Texas high school football team to win 800 games with a 31-24 victory over Denton Ryan in the Texas State Semi-Finals on December 10, 2016.

In 2016, Allen led the Scots to their second state title during his tenure, winning the AAAAA Division I Championship 16-7 against Temple High School. Allen was named the Don Shula National Coach of the Year for 2016.

In 2017, Allen led Highland Park to its fifth state championship and the third during his tenure, in a win against Manvel High School, 53-49. He announced his retirement in the spring of 2018 thereafter. He rescinded his retirement only three weeks later. The following year, Allen led Highland Park to its sixth state championship and fourth title during his tenure. Highland Park defeated Shadow Creek High School 27-17 in the AAAAA Division I State Championship.

On September 9, 2022, Allen became the 2nd winningest coach in Texas high school football history with win number 427 over Lake Highlands 52-21. As of the beginning of the 2025 season, Coach Allen remains the winningest active football coach in the state of Texas.

== Awards and accolades ==
- 2006 National High School Coaches Association Football Coach of the Year
- 2013 Grant Teaff Fellowship of Christian Athletes Lifetime Achievement Award.
- 2015 recipient of the AFCA Power of Influence Award
- 2016 NFL Don Shula National High School Coach of the Year Award
- 2017 SMU Distinguished Alumni Award
- 2018 National High School Coaches Association National Football Coach of the Year
- 2024 THSCA Tom Landry Award Winner
- 2024 - Highlander Stadium Field was renamed Randy Allen Field in his honor

== Head coaching record ==
Year	Team	Overall	Conference	Standing	Bowl/playoffs
Ballinger Bearcats () (1981–1985)
1981	Ballinger	2–8			
1982	Ballinger	9–3		1st	
1983	Ballinger	12–1–1		1st	
1984	Ballinger	11–1		1st	
1985	Ballinger	10–2–1		1st	
Ballinger:		44–15–2			
Brownwood Lions () (1986–1990)
1986	Brownwood	9–2			
1987	Brownwood	11–2		1st	
1988	Brownwood	8–2–1		1st	
1989	Brownwood	10–2		1st	
1990	Brownwood	5–5–1		2nd	
Brownwood:		43–13–2			
Abilene Cooper Cougars () (1991–1998)
1991	Abilene Cooper	4–6			
1992	Abilene Cooper	7–4		2nd	
1993	Abilene Cooper	9–4–1		3rd	
1994	Abilene Cooper	10–2		2nd	
1995	Abilene Cooper	6–5–1		3rd	
1996	Abilene Cooper	12–4		2nd	
1997	Abilene Cooper	12–2		1st	
1998	Abilene Cooper	6–4			
Abilene Cooper:		66–31–2			
Highland Park Scots () (1999–present)
1999	Highland Park	10–1		1st	
2000	Highland Park	10–1		1st	
2001	Highland Park	12–2		1st	
2002	Highland Park	12–1		1st	
2003	Highland Park	13–2		1st	
2004	Highland Park	8–2	5–0	1st	
2005	Highland Park	15–0	5–0	1st	
2006	Highland Park	11–1	7–0	1st	
2007	Highland Park	15–1	7–0	1st	
2008	Highland Park	11–2	6–1	2nd	
2009	Highland Park	11–2	7–0	1st	
2010	Highland Park	12–1	7–0	1st	
2011	Highland Park	12–1	7–0	1st	
2012	Highland Park	9–2	7–0	1st	
2013	Highland Park	13–2	7–0	1st	
2014	Highland Park	10–2	6–1	2nd	
2015	Highland Park	10–2	7–0	1st	
2016	Highland Park	14–2	6–1	1st	
2017	Highland Park	15–1	7–0	1st	
2018	Highland Park	16–0	7–0	1st	
2019	Highland Park	11–2	7–0	1st	
2020	Highland Park	10–2	5–1	2nd	
2021	Highland Park	10–2	6–0	1st	
2022	Highland Park	11–1	8–0	1st	
2023	Highland Park	11–2	7–1	2nd	
2024	Highland Park	14–2	6–0	1st	
2025	Highland Park	12-2	5–0	2nd	
Highland Park:		319-41			
Total:		472–100–6			
National championship Conference title Conference division title or championship game berth
