= Miles, Texas =

- City
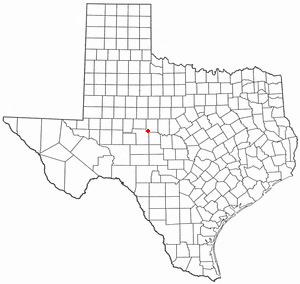
- Location of Miles, Texas

- Coordinates: 31°36′02″N 100°11′07″W
- Country: United States
- State: Texas
- County: Runnels

Area
  - Total: 1.70 sq mi (4.41 km^{2})
  - Land: 1.70 sq mi (4.41 km^{2})
  - Water: 0 sq mi (0.00 km^{2})
- Elevation: 1,808 ft (551 m)

Population (2020)
  - Total: 875
  - Density: 514/sq mi (198/km^{2})
- Time zone: UTC-6 (Central (CST))
  - Summer (DST): UTC-5 (CDT)
- ZIP code: 76861
- Area code: 325
- FIPS code: 48-48396
- GNIS feature ID: 2411104
- Website: www.milestexas.com

Miles is a city in Runnels County, Texas, United States. The population was 875 at the 2020 census.

The city was named after Johnathan Miles, who donated $5,000 to a fund for an extension of a railroad track.

== Geography ==
According to the United States Census Bureau, the city has a total area of 1.4 square miles (3.6 km^{2}), all land.

== Demographics ==
Historical population
Census	Pop.	Note	%±
1910	1,302		—
1920	853		−34.5%
1930	973		14.1%
1940	814		−16.3%
1950	739		−9.2%
1960	626		−15.3%
1970	631		0.8%
1980	720		14.1%
1990	793		10.1%
2000	850		7.2%
2010	829		−2.5%
2020	875		5.5%
U.S. Decennial Census

=== 2020 census ===
As of the 2020 census, there were 875 people, 316 households, and 241 families residing in the city.

The median age was 38.9 years. 27.0% of residents were under the age of 18 and 15.3% of residents were 65 years of age or older. For every 100 females there were 109.3 males, and for every 100 females age 18 and over there were 102.2 males age 18 and over.

0.0% of residents lived in urban areas, while 100.0% lived in rural areas.

There were 316 households in Miles, of which 42.1% had children under the age of 18 living in them. Of all households, 57.0% were married-couple households, 18.7% were households with a male householder and no spouse or partner present, and 20.9% were households with a female householder and no spouse or partner present. About 22.8% of all households were made up of individuals and 13.0% had someone living alone who was 65 years of age or older.

There were 364 housing units, of which 13.2% were vacant. The homeowner vacancy rate was 1.9% and the rental vacancy rate was 10.1%.

Racial composition as of the 2020 census
Race	Number	Percent
White	601	68.7%
Black or African American	2	0.2%
American Indian and Alaska Native	5	0.6%
Asian	0	0.0%
Native Hawaiian and Other Pacific Islander	0	0.0%
Some other race	123	14.1%
Two or more races	144	16.5%
Hispanic or Latino (of any race)	360	41.1%

=== 2000 census ===
As of the census of 2000, 850 people, 309 households, and 237 families resided in the city. The population density was 636.2 inhabitants per square mile (245.6/km^{2}). There were 361 housing units at an average density of 270.2 per square mile (104.3/km^{2}). The racial makeup of the city was 78.00% White, 0.12% African American, 0.12% Asian, 19.88% from other races, and 1.88% from two or more races. Hispanics or Latinos of any race were 37.29% of the population.

Of the 309 households, 34.3% had children under the age of 18 living with them, 64.4% were married couples living together, 10.0% had a female householder with no husband present, and 23.3% were not families. About 22.0% of all households were made up of individuals, and 14.2% had someone living alone who was 65 years of age or older. The average household size was 2.75 and the average family size was 3.23.

In the city, the population was distributed as 28.4% under the age of 18, 7.3% from 18 to 24, 27.3% from 25 to 44, 21.1% from 45 to 64, and 16.0% who were 65 years of age or older. The median age was 36 years. For every 100 females, there were 93.2 males. For every 100 females age 18 and over, there were 92.1 males.

The median income for a household in the city was $30,461, and for a family was $34,000. Males had a median income of $25,000 versus $20,789 for females. The per capita income for the city was $15,148. About 15.2% of families and 17.4% of the population were below the poverty line, including 19.8% of those under age 18 and 25.4% of those age 65 or over.

== Education ==
The city is served by the Miles Independent School District.
