= Miles Independent School District =

School district in Texas

Miles Independent School District is a public school district based in Miles, Texas (USA).

Located in Runnels County, a portion of the district extends into Tom Green County.

Miles ISD has two campuses – Miles High (Grades 7-12) and Miles Elementary (Grades PK-6).

In 2009, the school district was rated "academically acceptable" by the Texas Education Agency.
