= Norton, Texas =

Unincorporated community in Texas, US

Coordinates: 31°52′15″N 100°07′31″W

Norton is an unincorporated community in Runnels County, Texas, United States. According to the Handbook of Texas, the community had an estimated population of 76 in 2000.

Norton, founded in 1903, was named after George W. Norton, a businessman from Kentucky. In 1968, Norton High School was destroyed by a fire. Students were split between neighboring Ballinger, Bronte, and Winters school districts. Part of the original school still stands and serves as a community center.
