= Ballinger High School =

Coordinates: 31.7511°N 99.9752°W

Location
- 2107 N Broadway; Ballinger, Texas 76821-0231; United States

Information
- School type: Public High School
- School district: Ballinger Independent School District
- Principal: Robert Webb
- Staff: 25.48 (FTE)
- Grades: 9-12
- Enrollment: 239 (2023-2024)
- Student to teacher ratio: 9.38
- Colors: Red, black, and white
- Athletics conference: UIL Class 3A
- Mascot: Bearcat
- Yearbook: Paw Prints
- Website: Ballinger High School

Ballinger High School is a public high school located in Ballinger, Texas (USA) and classified as a 3A school by the UIL. It is part of the Ballinger Independent School District located in south central Runnels County. In 2015, the school was rated "Met Standard" by the Texas Education Agency.

== Athletics ==
The Ballinger Bearcats compete in these sports -

Cross Country, Football, Basketball, Powerlifting, Golf, Tennis, Track, Softball & Baseball

=== State Titles ===
- Girls Cross Country -
  - 2001(3A)

==== State Finalists ====
- Football -
  - 1953(2A)
