= Ballinger Independent School District =

School district in Texas

Location
- 802 Conda Ave. Ballinger, Texas ESC Region 15 USA
- Coordinates: 31°45′6″N 99°58′20″W

District information
- Type: Independent school district
- Grades: Pre-K through 12
- Superintendent: Caroline Toliver >
- Schools: 4 (2009-10)
- NCES District ID: 4809300

Students and staff
- Students: 988 (2010-11)
- Teachers: 86.23 (2009-10) (on full-time equivalent (FTE) basis)
- Student–teacher ratio: 11.92 (2009-10)
- Athletic conference: UIL Class 2A Football Division II
- District mascot: Bearcats
- Colors: Red, Black

Other information
- TEA District Accountability Rating for 2011-12: Academically Acceptable
- Website: Ballinger ISD

Ballinger Independent School District is a public school district based in Ballinger, Texas (USA) that serves students in southern Runnels County.

== Finances ==
As of the 2010–2011 school year, the appraised valuation of property in the district was $244,896,000. The maintenance tax rate was $0.117 and the bond tax rate was $0.000 per $100 of appraised valuation.

== Academic achievement ==
In 2011, the school district was rated "academically acceptable" by the Texas Education Agency. Forty-nine percent of districts in Texas in 2011 received the same rating. No state accountability ratings will be given to districts in 2012. A school district in Texas can receive one of four possible rankings from the Texas Education Agency: Exemplary (the highest possible ranking), Recognized, Academically Acceptable, and Academically Unacceptable (the lowest possible ranking).

Historical district TEA accountability ratings

- 2011: Academically Acceptable
- 2010: Recognized
- 2009: Academically Unacceptable
- 2008: Recognized
- 2007: Academically Acceptable
- 2006: Academically Acceptable
- 2005: Academically Acceptable
- 2004: Recognized

== Schools ==
In the 2011–2012 school year, Ballinger ISD had four schools.

Regular instructional

- Ballinger High School (Grades 9–12)
- Ballinger Junior High School (Grades 6–8)
- Ballinger Elementary School (Grades Pre-K through 5)

Alternative instructional

- Fairview Accelerated (Grades 7–12)

== See also ==
- List of school districts in Texas
- List of high schools in Texas
