= Benoit, Texas =

Benoit
- Unincorporated community
- Location within the state of Texas Benoit (the United States)
- Coordinates: 31°46′59″N 99°49′44″W
- Country: United States
- State: Texas
- County: Runnels
- Elevation: 1,719 ft (524 m)
- Time zone: UTC-6 (Central (CST))
  - Summer (DST): UTC-5 (CDT)
- Area code: 325
- GNIS feature ID: 1377993

Benoit is an unincorporated community in Runnels County, Texas, United States.
