= Ballinger Carnegie Library =

- U.S. National Register of Historic Places
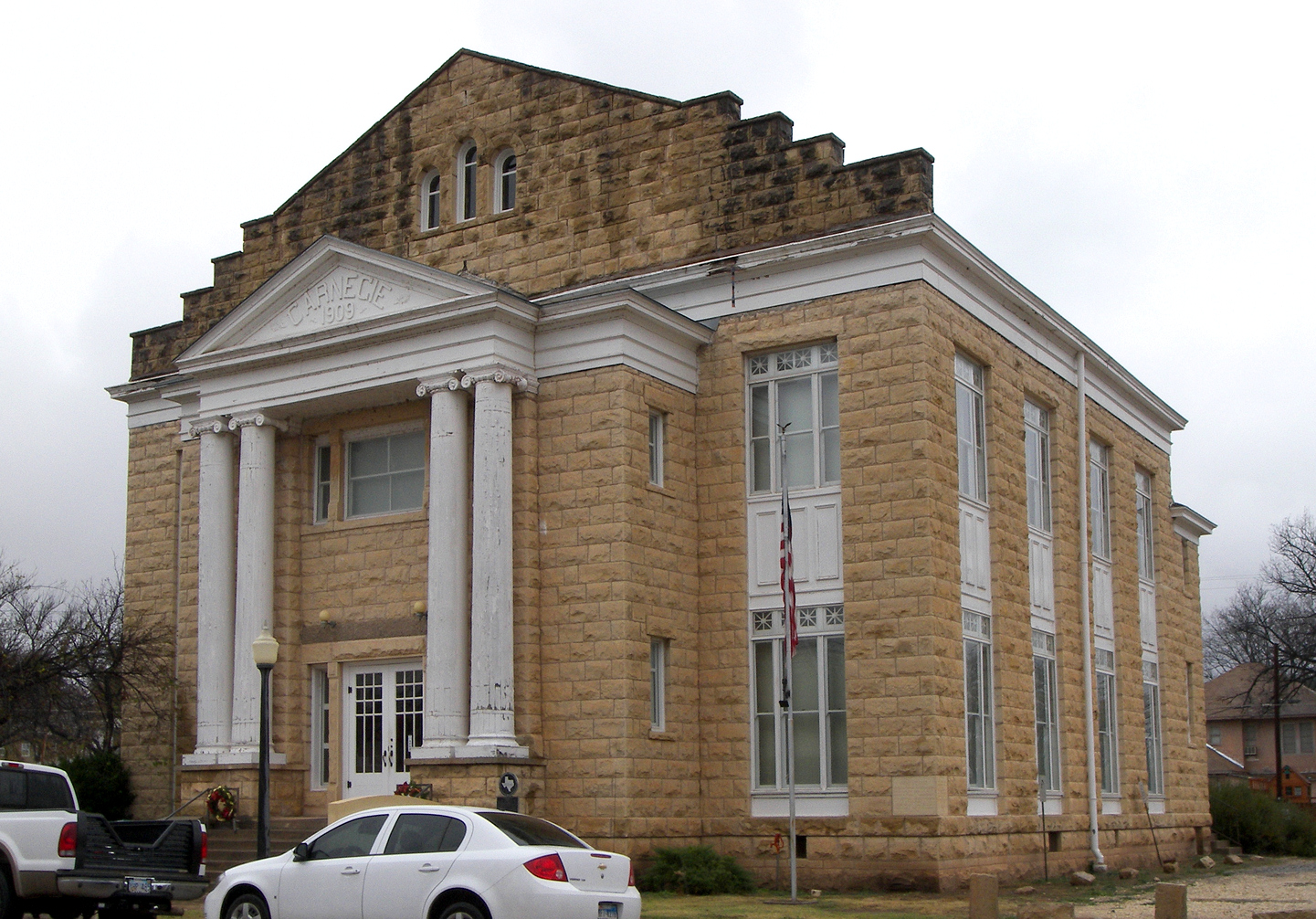

- Location within Texas Location within the United States
- Location: 204 N. 8th St., Ballinger, Texas
- Coordinates: 31°44′23″N 99°56′59″W
- Area: 1 acre (0.40 ha)
- Built: 1909
- Built by: Leslie, J.D.
- Architectural style: Vernacular Classical Revival
- NRHP reference No.: 75002002
- Added to NRHP: June 18, 1975

The Ballinger Carnegie Library, at 204 N. 8th St. in Ballinger, Texas, is a Carnegie library which was built in 1909. It was listed on the National Register of Historic Places in 1975. It is one of only five Carnegie Libraries in Texas, out of 32 built, to remain in use as a public library.

It is built in "a vernacular version" of Classical Revival style. Its most prominent feature is a two-story portico.

After construction of a one-story building was started, it was redesigned to add a second floor auditorium. Additional funding from the Carnegie Foundation was sought and denied, but followups led to another check from Andrew Carnegie.

The building, in addition to serving as the library, was an important cultural center for the community. In early years it was run by members of a Shakespeare club, and was later taken over by an American Legion group.

It is a Texas State Antiquities Landmark and a Recorded Texas Historic Landmark.
