= Tornadoes of 1982 =

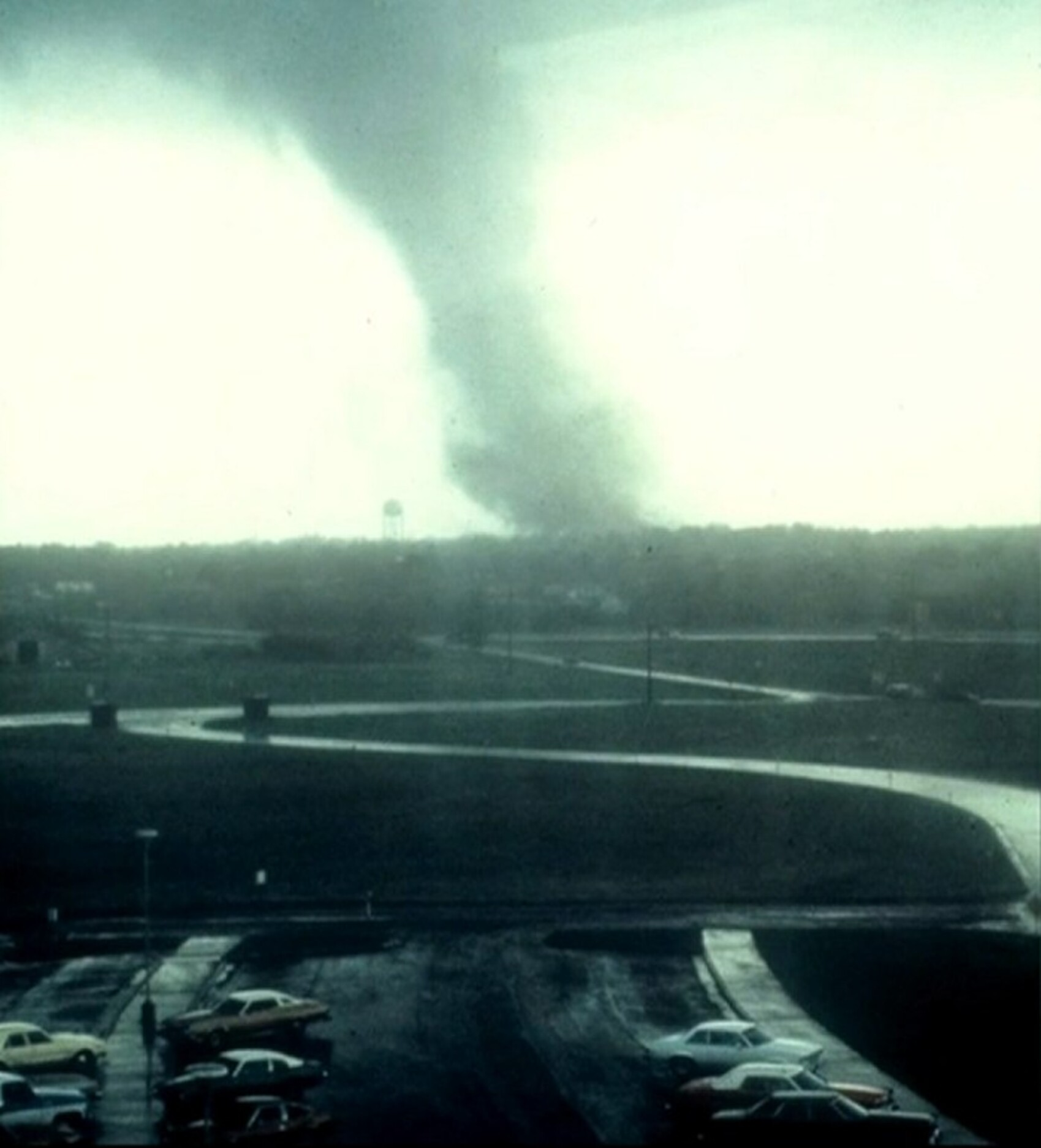
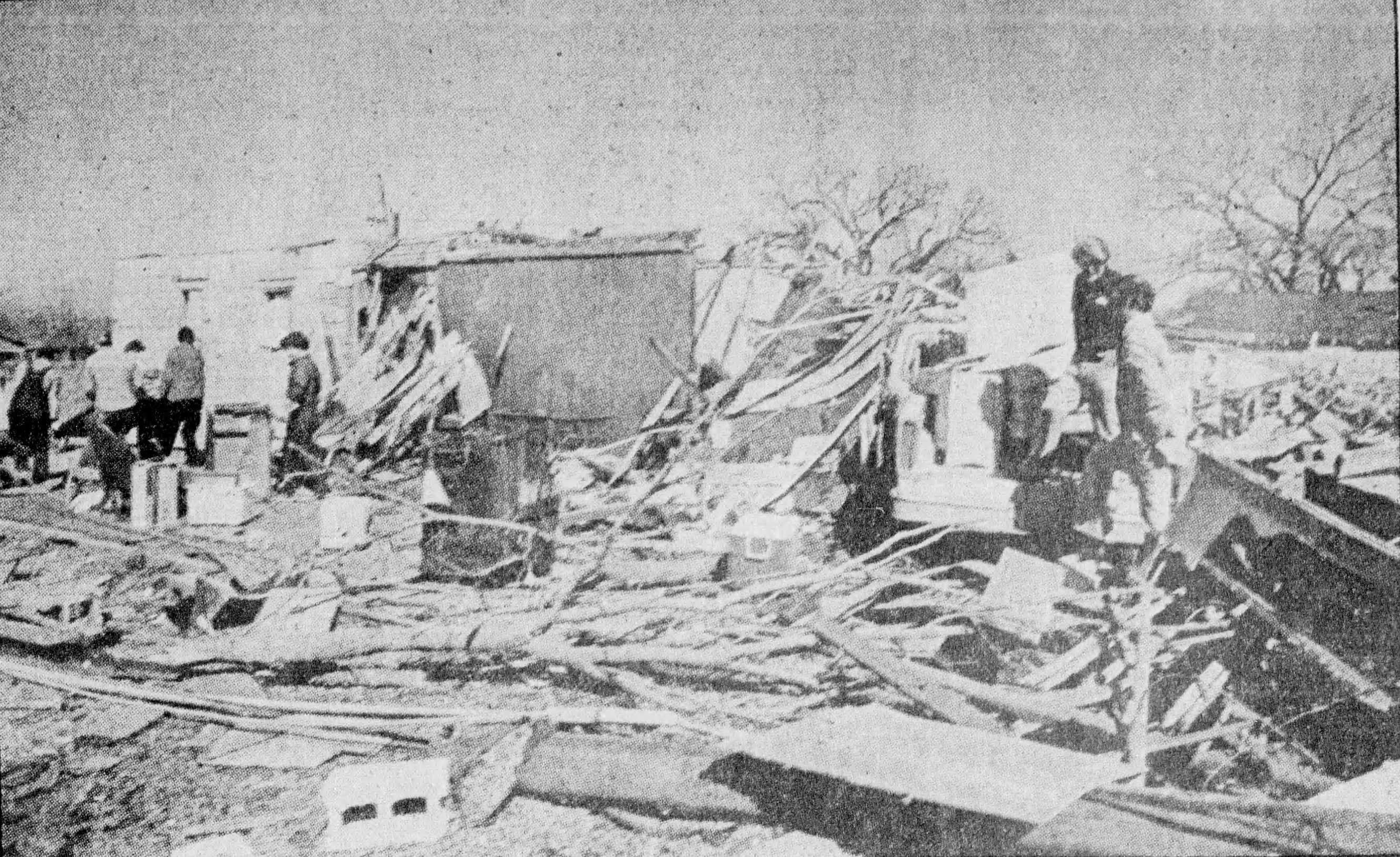
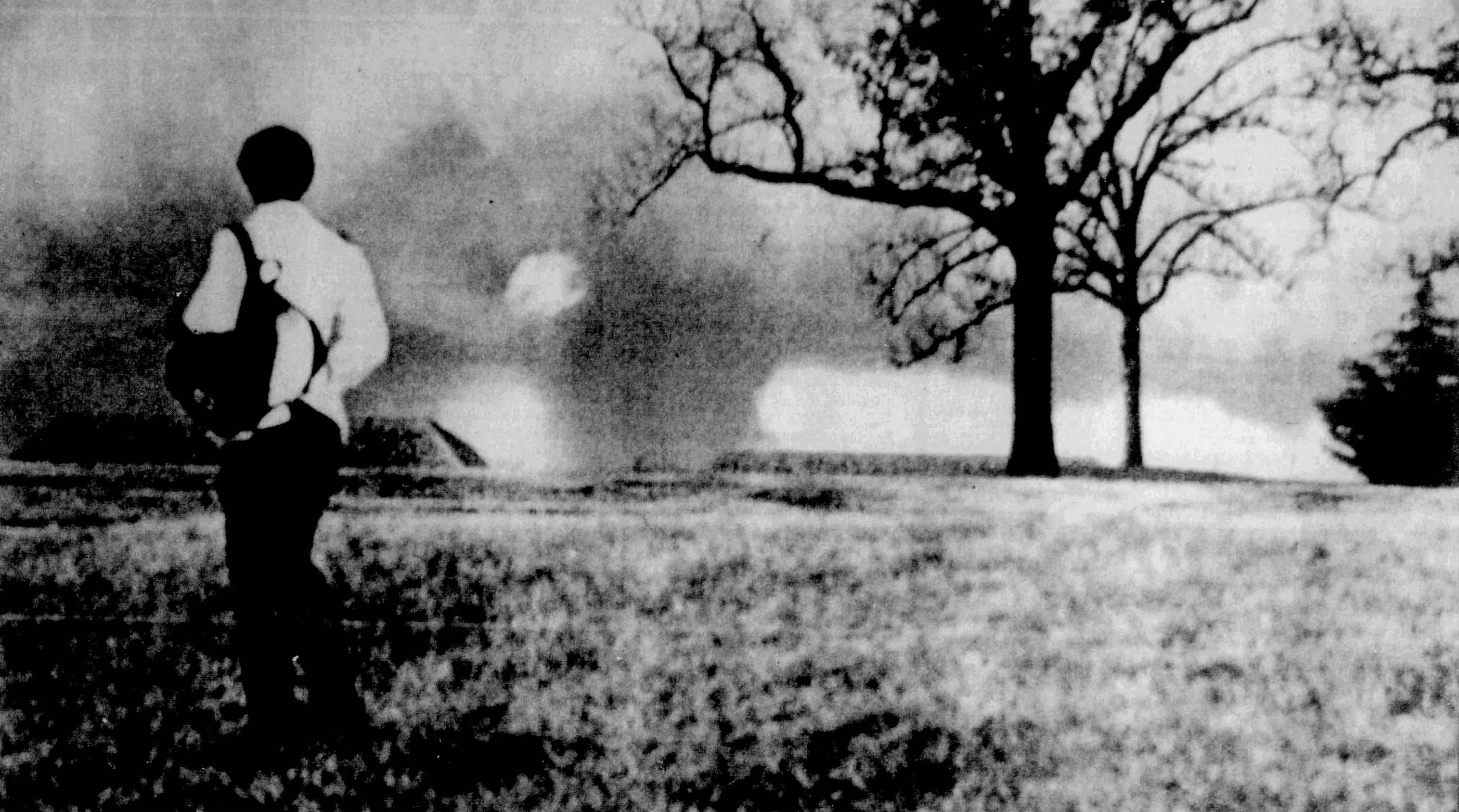
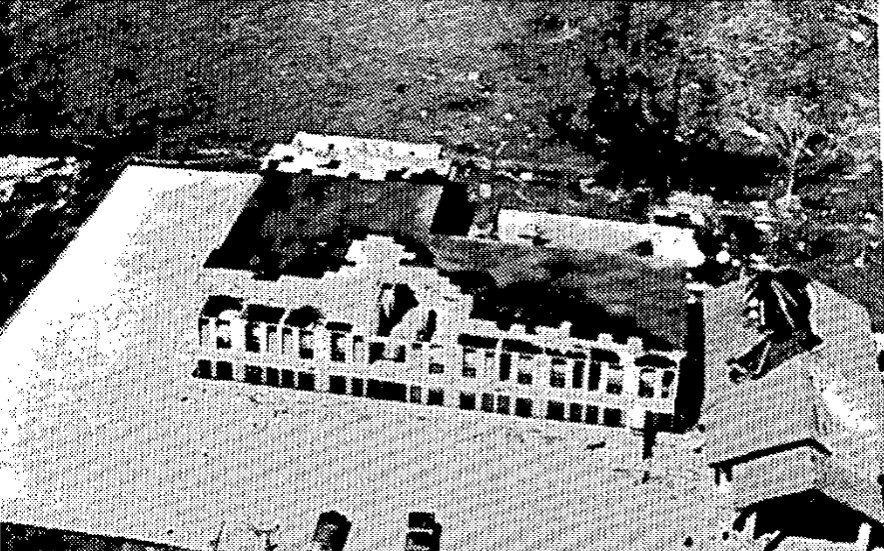
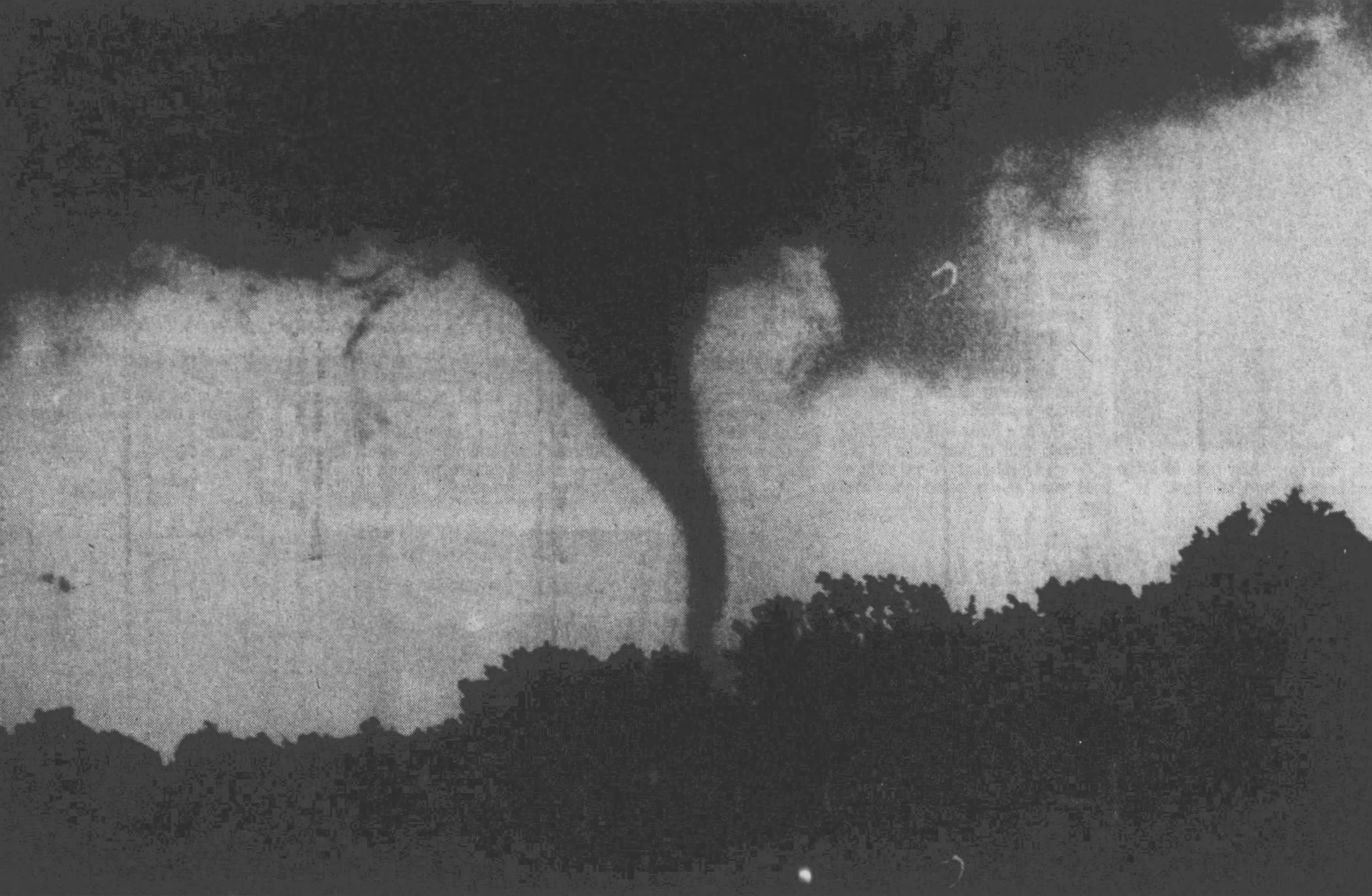
- Clockwise from top: A deadly F4 tornado in Paris, Texas on April 2; The ruins of a furniture store in Bartlesville, Oklahoma after an F2 tornado on March 15; A motel south of Broken Bow, Oklahoma after an F5 tornado on April 2; A tall F4 tornado approaching Marion, Illinois on May 29; A large F3 tornado approaching Little Rock, Arkansas on December 2; A radar loop of tornadic supercells over southern Illinois on May 29.
- Timespan: January–December 1982
- Maximum rated tornado: F5 tornado: Broken Bow, Oklahoma on April 2
- Tornadoes in U.S.: 1,047
- Damage (U.S.): >$100 million
- Fatalities (U.S.): 64
- Fatalities (worldwide): >64

This page documents the tornadoes and tornado outbreaks of 1982, primarily in the United States. Most tornadoes form in the U.S., although some events may take place internationally. Tornado statistics for older years like this often appear significantly lower than modern years due to fewer reports or confirmed tornadoes.

== Synopsis ==
Fatal United States tornadoes in 1982
- Approximate touchdown location of killer tornadoes in 1982
Summary of tornadoes
- January 3 – Mississippi (1 death)
- March 15 – Oklahoma (1 death)
- March 15 – Kansas (1 death)
- March 15 – Kansas, Missouri (2 deaths)
- March 15 – Kansas (1 death)
- March 30 – Illinois (1 death)
- April 2 – Texas (1 death)
- April 2 – Texas (10 deaths)
- April 2 – Texas, Oklahoma, Arkansas (1 death)
- April 2 – Arkansas (1 death)
- April 2 – Arkansas (3 deaths)
- April 2 – Arkansas (5 deaths)
- April 2 – Missouri (2 deaths)
- April 2 – Arkansas (2 deaths)
- April 2 – Arkansas (2 deaths)
- April 2 – Mississippi (3 deaths)
- May 11 – Oklahoma (2 deaths)
- May 13 – Texas (1 death)
- May 28 – Arkansas (1 death)
- May 29 – Illinois (10 deaths)
- June 13 – North Carolina (1 death)
- June 15 – Michigan (1 death)
- June 16 – West Virginia (1 death)
- June 17 – Florida (1 death)
- September 3 – Texas (1 death)
- September 26 – Florida (1 death)
- December 2 – Arkansas (2 deaths)
- December 2 – Illinois (2 deaths)
- December 24 – Arkansas (1 death)
- December 24 – Missouri (1 death)
- December 24 – Arkansas (1 death)
Total fatalities: 64

Numbers for 1982 were slightly above average, both in terms of number of tornadoes and number of fatalities. Probably the most notable tornado events of the year was the April 2–3 tornado outbreak resulting in 29 fatalities primarily in Texas and Oklahoma and the May 29 Marion, Illinois tornado which killed ten people.

== Events ==
Confirmed tornado total for the entire year 1982 in the United States.

Confirmed tornadoes by Fujita rating
FU	F0	F1	F2	F3	F4	F5	Total
0	374	421	187	58	6	1	1,047

== January ==
Throughout January, 18 tornadoes were confirmed across the United States. This is above the annual average of 15.

=== January 3–4 ===
FU	F0	F1	F2	F3	F4	F5
0	1	5	4	1	0	0

In early January, a major winter storm affected nearly the entire Contiguous United States, including widespread blizzard conditions in the Midwest. Along the southern edge of the storm, an early season tornado outbreak took place across the Gulf Coast. The first tornado was an F3 that killed one person and injured 17 others in Newton County, Mississippi, becoming the first killer January tornado since 1978. Sixty structures were damaged or destroyed by the tornado, leaving $2 million in losses. Four F2 tornadoes touched down across Alabama during the course of the outbreak. In Clanton, Alabama, two of these tornadoes struck the town an hour apart, forcing rescuers to seek shelter before the arrival of the second. Overall, 11 tornadoes touched down, leaving one person dead, 34 injured and $4.3 million in losses.

== February ==
In the Contiguous United States, only one tornado touched down during the month of February, marking a record low value that would not be matched until 2010. However, two additional tornadoes took place in Honolulu, Hawaii, both of which were rated F2. Nearly 24 homes sustained damage from one of these tornadoes.

== March ==
There were 60 tornadoes confirmed in the US in March.

=== March 13–17 ===
FU	F0	F1	F2	F3	F4	F5
0	3	12	11	7	0	0

Twenty-three tornadoes touched down during an outbreak in Kansas and Missouri on March 15. An F3 killed one and injured 36 near Ada, Oklahoma. Later that evening, an F3 tore through Kansas and Missouri on a 70 mi (113 km) track. Several homes in Arma were moved off their foundations and 50 homes were destroyed in Mulberry. A 41-year-old woman was killed in Mulberry when her mobile home was hit. After 46 miles on the ground, the tornado lifted briefly and then touched down again and finally dissipated near Osceola. In Missouri, 34 structures were destroyed and 70 damaged. A 75-year-old woman died in Cedar Springs when her home was hit. Two other F3s killed two in Kansas.

=== March 18–20 ===
FU	F0	F1	F2	F3	F4	F5
0	2	2	4	0	1	0

An F4 tornado moved through Texas and Oklahoma on March 18, injuring 12.

=== March 28–31 ===
FU	F0	F1	F2	F3	F4	F5
0	2	6	3	0	0	0

An F2 tornado killed one person near Ina, Illinois on March 30.

== April ==
There were 150 tornadoes confirmed in the US in April.

=== April 2–3 ===
FU	F0	F1	F2	F3	F4	F5
0	8	26	14	11	3	1

A major outbreak on April 2–3 resulted in over 60 tornadoes and 29 fatalities. Three tornadoes were rated F4, while another tornado near Broken Bow, Oklahoma (no fatalities) was rated F5, although the rating is disputed. One F4 tornado (rating also disputed) in Paris, Texas resulted in 10 fatalities and 170 injuries.

=== April 14–17 ===
FU	F0	F1	F2	F3	F4	F5
0	13	7	7	0	0	0

=== April 19–20 ===
FU	F0	F1	F2	F3	F4	F5
0	4	8	4	1	0	0

=== April 25–27 ===
FU	F0	F1	F2	F3	F4	F5
0	5	13	7	6	0	0

== May ==
There were 329 tornadoes confirmed in the US in May and 14 fatalities. At the time, this set a record for the most tornadoes during the month of May.

=== May 9-June 2 ===
FU	F0	F1	F2	F3	F4	F5
0	150	103	42	16	1	0

Between May 9 and June 2, at least one tornado touched down each day across the United States in a prolonged tornado outbreak sequence, encompassing 312 tornadoes across four separate storm systems.

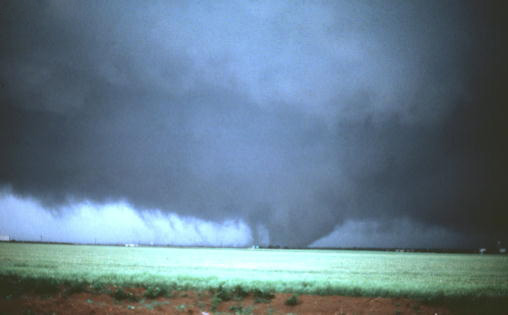
Altus, Oklahoma tornado May 11, 1982

On May 11, 41 people were injured by an F3 tornado on the southeast side of Altus, Oklahoma before another F3 tornado killed two people and injured 18 in Blair, Oklahoma. The worst day of the sequence was May 29, when a small, but deadly series of tornadoes touched down in Illinois, Missouri, and Indiana, with Marion, Illinois being the hardest hit. 10 fatalities occurred there after the town took a direct hit from an F4 tornado. The outbreak also produced a F3 tornado affecting Conant, Illinois and several weaker tornadoes in the surrounding area.

== June ==
There were 196 tornadoes confirmed in the US in June, resulting in four fatalities.

=== June 2 (France) ===
A brief but powerful F4 tornado devastated the eastern portion of Levier, France. Five houses, a farm, and a sawmill were completely destroyed. Eight people were injured, but nobody was killed.

=== June 10–18 ===
On June 15, there were 7 tornadoes confirmed in Michigan (one as high as F3) causing one fatality and 6 injuries. The one fatality occurred in Jackson County and three of the injuries occurred in Saginaw County. On June 16, there was an F2 in Fleming County, Kentucky and an F3 in Lewis County. Together, the two twisters caused 5 injuries.

=== June 30 (Canada) ===
FU	F0	F1	F2	F3	F4	F5	Total
0	0	2	1	1	0	0	4

Four tornadoes touched down in Central Alberta on the afternoon of June 30, including a strong F3 tornado that caused severe damage near Rocky Mountain House. Two mobile homes were destroyed, with a log cabin and several outbuildings were significantly damaged. One person was injured by this tornado, which tracked for roughly 20 km (12 mi) and caused $500,000 in damages. Two F1 tornadoes were reported near Kinsella and Lacombe, while a stronger F2 damaged farm equipment near Viking.

== July ==
There were 95 tornadoes confirmed in the US in July.

== August ==
There were 34 tornadoes confirmed in the US in August.

== September ==
There were 38 tornadoes confirmed in the US in September, resulting in two fatalities.

=== September 3 ===
An F1 touched down east of Humble, Texas. Although the path was just 1 mile, it collapsed a garage under construction, killing a construction worker and injuring two others.

=== September 26 ===
An F2 touched down near Basinger, Florida, killing one and injuring seven. The same day, an F0 struck in Tigers Bay, Northern Ireland, there were no known injuries and fatalities.

== October ==
There were 9 tornadoes confirmed in the US in October.

== November ==
There were 19 tornadoes confirmed in the US in November.

== December ==
There were 96 tornadoes confirmed in the US in December. At the time, the number of tornadoes in the month vastly exceeded the previous record of 61 set in 1967. Arkansas and Missouri both experienced the highest number of December tornadoes on record, with 46 and 30 touching down in the respective states. This value was later eclipsed in 2002 when 99 tornadoes were confirmed, and then again in 2021, when 220 tornadoes touched down.

=== December 1–3 ===
FU	F0	F1	F2	F3	F4	F5
0	3	22	6	7	0	0

A prolific December tornado outbreak took place over the first few days of the month, with 38 tornadoes confirmed over three days. The outbreak primarily affected Missouri and Arkansas, with an F3 tornado directly hitting the west end of Little Rock, Arkansas killing two people. Another F3 tornado passed through the small community of New Baden, Illinois, resulting in two fatalities and causing an estimated $7.5 million in damages. It was the largest single tornado outbreak in the month of December at the time, before it was beaten again later that same month.

=== December 23–25 ===
FU	F0	F1	F2	F3	F4	F5
0	5	18	16	4	1	0

Another extremely prolific and large tornado outbreak took place throughout December 23 and 24, ending with an F2 tornado hitting the north end of Memphis on December 25 at around 4:00 AM CST. 44 tornadoes were confirmed over about 36 hours, making it the largest December tornado outbreak on record at the time. The record would be surpassed twice during the 2021 season. An F3 tornado directly hit Vilonia, Arkansas on December 24, killing one person there. On the same day, another very long-tracked F4 tornado initially touched down near Ash Flat, Arkansas and dissipated near Van Buren, Missouri, travelling about 65 miles. No fatalities were recorded from that tornado, but 11 people were significantly injured.

== See also ==
- Tornado
  - Tornadoes by year
  - Tornado records
  - Tornado climatology
  - Tornado myths
- List of tornado outbreaks
  - List of F5 and EF5 tornadoes
  - List of North American tornadoes and tornado outbreaks
  - List of 21st-century Canadian tornadoes and tornado outbreaks
  - List of European tornadoes and tornado outbreaks
  - List of tornadoes and tornado outbreaks in Asia
  - List of Southern Hemisphere tornadoes and tornado outbreaks
  - List of tornadoes striking downtown areas
- Tornado intensity
  - Fujita scale
  - Enhanced Fujita scale
