= Ballinger, Texas =

City in the United States

- City
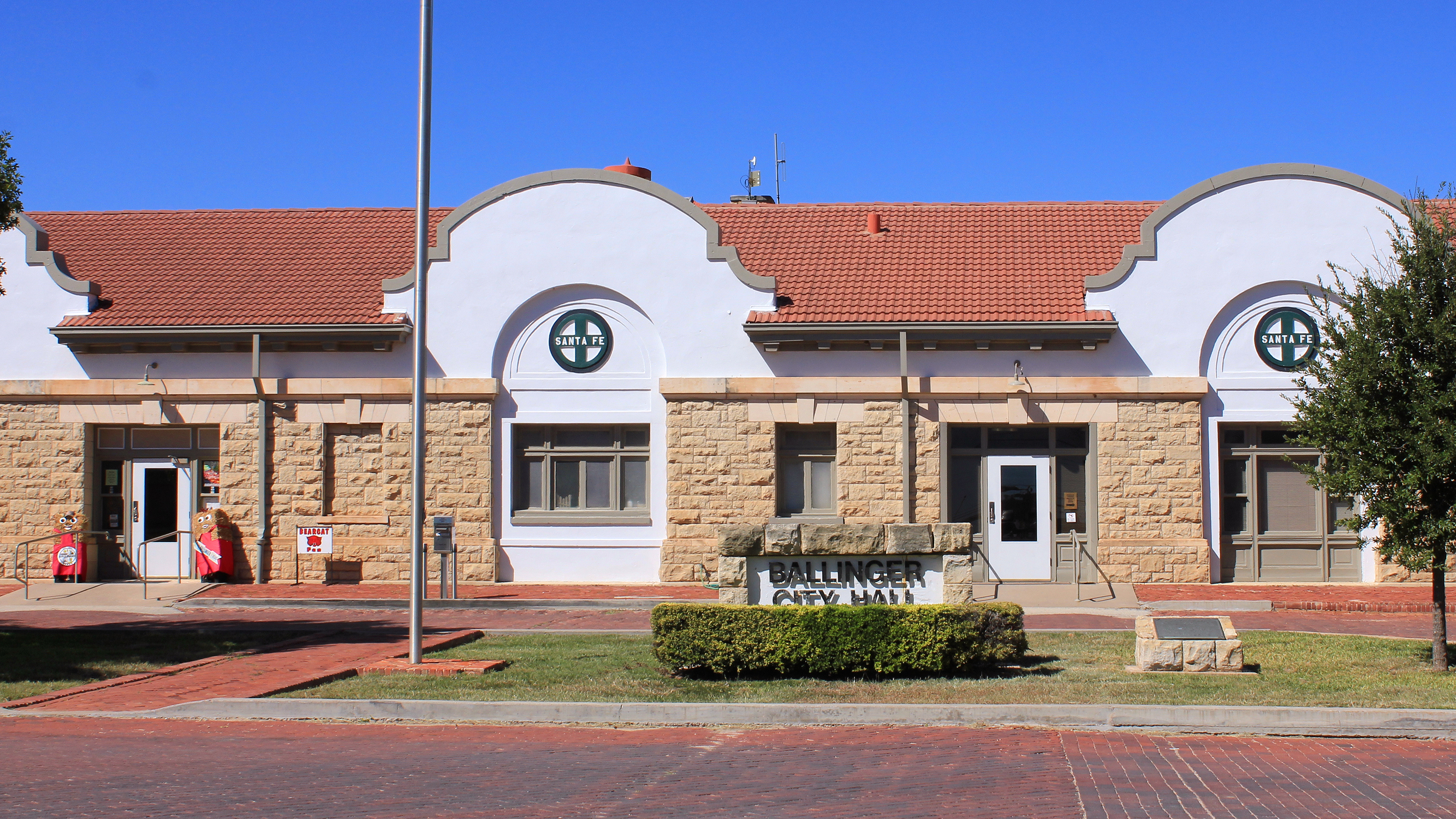
- Ballinger Texas City Hall
- Motto: The Greatest Little Town in Texas
- Interactive map of Ballinger, Texas
- Coordinates: 31°44′42″N 99°57′36″W
- Country: United States
- State: Texas
- County: Runnels

Area
  - Total: 3.50 sq mi (9.07 km^{2})
  - Land: 3.50 sq mi (9.06 km^{2})
  - Water: 0.0039 sq mi (0.01 km^{2})
- Elevation: 1,647 ft (502 m)

Population (2020)
  - Total: 3,619
  - Density: 1,000/sq mi (400/km^{2})
- Time zone: UTC-6 (Central (CST))
  - Summer (DST): UTC-5 (CDT)
- ZIP code: 76821
- Area code: 325
- FIPS code: 48-05456
- GNIS feature ID: 2409778
- Website: www.baltx.org

Ballinger (/ˈbælɪndʒər/ BAL-in-jər) is a city in Runnels County, Texas, United States. Its population was 3,619 at the 2020 census. It is the county seat of Runnels County. Downtown Ballinger features historic 1800s buildings with shops and restaurants.

== History ==
Ballinger was founded in 1886. It was established when the Gulf, Colorado and Santa Fe Railway built a railway west from Brownwood. Runnels City, the original county seat, campaigned for selection as the new railroad terminal, but the future site of Ballinger, five miles to the south, offered a better water supply.

The 1.7-square-mile area was laid out in large lots, with a courthouse square and public park set aside for future use. Santa Fe officials offered free property to anyone who would move a home from Runnels City to Ballinger and to any church that would erect a building.

The town was named in honor of William Pitt Ballinger, a Galveston attorney and stockholder of the Gulf, Colorado and Santa Fe.

Ballinger was incorporated in 1892.

In 1911, Ballinger opened the Ballinger Carnegie Library, built with funds donated by Andrew Carnegie. By 1975, the building was in disrepair. The Ballinger Bicentennial Committee organized a renovation effort, and the library was placed on the National Register of Historic Places.

== Geography ==
Ballinger is located in the transition zone from the Edwards Plateau to the Texas Southern Plains region of West Texas.

According to the United States Census Bureau, the city has a total area of 3.4 square miles (8.7 km^{2}), of which 0.0019 square miles (0.005 km^{2}), or 0.06%, is covered by water.

Ballinger is about 70 miles (110 km) south of Abilene and 36 mi northeast of San Angelo, Texas.

=== Climate ===
The climate in this area is characterized by hot, humid summers and generally mild to cool winters. According to the Köppen climate classification, Ballinger has a humid subtropical climate, Cfa on climate maps.

Climate data for Ballinger, Texas (1991–2020 normals, extremes 1897–present)
Month	Jan	Feb	Mar	Apr	May	Jun	Jul	Aug	Sep	Oct	Nov	Dec	Year
Record high °F (°C)	90 (32)	98 (37)	100 (38)	104 (40)	110 (43)	116 (47)	112 (44)	114 (46)	110 (43)	105 (41)	98 (37)	92 (33)	116 (47)
Mean daily maximum °F (°C)	59.0 (15.0)	63.1 (17.3)	70.5 (21.4)	79.4 (26.3)	85.9 (29.9)	92.2 (33.4)	95.5 (35.3)	95.1 (35.1)	88.2 (31.2)	79.4 (26.3)	68.0 (20.0)	59.9 (15.5)	78.0 (25.6)
Daily mean °F (°C)	45.1 (7.3)	49.2 (9.6)	56.9 (13.8)	65.1 (18.4)	73.3 (22.9)	80.3 (26.8)	83.5 (28.6)	83.1 (28.4)	76.2 (24.6)	66.0 (18.9)	54.7 (12.6)	46.4 (8.0)	65.0 (18.3)
Mean daily minimum °F (°C)	31.2 (−0.4)	35.2 (1.8)	43.2 (6.2)	50.9 (10.5)	60.7 (15.9)	68.5 (20.3)	71.5 (21.9)	71.1 (21.7)	64.1 (17.8)	52.6 (11.4)	41.5 (5.3)	32.8 (0.4)	51.9 (11.1)
Record low °F (°C)	−6 (−21)	−4 (−20)	8 (−13)	24 (−4)	33 (1)	44 (7)	46 (8)	47 (8)	35 (2)	16 (−9)	8 (−13)	−3 (−19)	−6 (−21)
Average precipitation inches (mm)	1.01 (26)	1.52 (39)	1.79 (45)	1.56 (40)	3.08 (78)	3.07 (78)	1.67 (42)	2.41 (61)	2.57 (65)	2.20 (56)	1.45 (37)	1.04 (26)	23.37 (594)
Average snowfall inches (cm)	0.2 (0.51)	0.2 (0.51)	0.0 (0.0)	0.0 (0.0)	0.0 (0.0)	0.0 (0.0)	0.0 (0.0)	0.0 (0.0)	0.0 (0.0)	0.0 (0.0)	0.0 (0.0)	0.2 (0.51)	0.6 (1.5)
Average precipitation days (≥ 0.01 in)	3.8	4.0	5.0	3.8	6.2	5.3	4.0	4.7	5.0	4.9	4.0	3.7	54.4
Average snowy days (≥ 0.1 in)	0.1	0.2	0.0	0.0	0.0	0.0	0.0	0.0	0.0	0.0	0.1	0.2	0.6
Source: NOAA

== Demographics ==
Historical population
Census	Pop.	Note	%±
1900	1,128		—
1910	3,536		213.5%
1920	2,767		−21.7%
1930	4,187		51.3%
1940	4,472		6.8%
1950	5,302		18.6%
1960	5,043		−4.9%
1970	4,203		−16.7%
1980	4,207		0.1%
1990	3,975		−5.5%
2000	4,243		6.7%
2010	3,767		−11.2%
2020	3,619		−3.9%
U.S. Decennial Census

=== 2020 census ===
As of the 2020 census, 3,619, 1,364 households, and 860 families resided in the city.

The median age was 42.4 years, with 23.6% of residents under 18 and 21.7% 65 or older; for every 100 females, there were 93.9 males, and for every 100 females 18 and over there were 89.6 males.

Of the 1,364 households, 32.0% had children under 18 living in them, 46.0% were married-couple households, 16.1% were households with a male householder and no spouse or partner present, and 31.9% were households with a female householder and no spouse or partner present; 28.1% of all households were made up of individuals and 15.1% had someone living alone who was 65 or older.

The city had 1,731 housing units, of which 21.2% were vacant; among occupied units, 72.7% were owner-occupied and 27.3% were renter-occupied, with a homeowner vacancy rate of 2.3% and a rental vacancy rate of 12.1%.

None of the residents lived in urban areas, while 100.0% lived in rural areas.

Racial composition as of the 2020 census
Race	Percent
White	70.6%
Black or African American	2.4%
American Indian and Alaska Native	0.9%
Asian	0.4%
Native Hawaiian and Pacific Islander	0.2%
Some other race	11.2%
Two or more races	14.3%
Hispanic or Latino (of any race)	38.5%

=== 2000 census ===
As of the census of 2000, 4,243 people, 1,578 households, and 1,093 families resided the city. The population density was 1,266.7 inhabitants per square mile (489.1/km^{2}). The 1,879 housing units averaged 560.9 per square mile (216.6/km^{2}). The racial makeup of the city was 79.68% White, 2.14% African American, 0.71% Native American, 0.45% Asian, 14.52% from other races, and 2.50% from two or more races. Hispanics or Latinos of any race were 31.28% of the population.

Of 1,578 households, 33.1% had children under 18 living with them, 53.0% were married couples living together, 11.6% had a female householder with no husband present, and 30.7% were not families. About 28.6% of all households were made up of individuals, and 17.1% had someone living alone who was 65 or older. The average household size was 2.53 and family size was 3.10.

In the city, the age distribution was 26.9% under 18, 6.4% from 18 to 24, 25.5% from 25 to 44, 21.0% from 45 to 64, and 20.2% who were 65 or older. The median age was 38 years. For every 100 females, there were 88.3 males. For every 100 females age 18 and over, there were 80.9 males.

The median income for a household in the city was $26,129 and for a family was $31,393. Males had a median income of $24,207 versus $18,951 for females. The per capita income for the city was $11,917. About 14.3% of families and 17.2% of the population were below the poverty line, including 18.1% of those under 18 and 25.0% of those 65 or over.

== Education ==
The city is served by the Ballinger Independent School District and is home to the Ballinger High School Bearcats.

== Notable people ==
- Jay Carsey, college professor who twice disappeared to begin a new life
- David W. Guion, a widely performed classical composer and arranger of American folk music
- Hal Underwood, a professional golfer, won the European Tour

== Sports ==
Ballinger was home of the minor league baseball team the Ballinger Cats from the 1920s to its disbandment in the late 1950s. They were affiliated with the Cincinnati Reds from 1947 to 1950, as well with the bygone St. Louis Browns in the 1930s and early 1940s.

== Notable areas ==
- The Olde Park Hotel is reported as haunted. According to one of the previous owners, Jeanette Findlay has identified 30 beings present in the hotel. The hotel's reputation has resulted in it appearing in paranormal television programming. As recent as 2019, it was visited by paranormal investigator and actor Chad Lindberg. The hotel was to be featured in the Travel Channel television show Fright Club, hosted by Jack Osbourne.

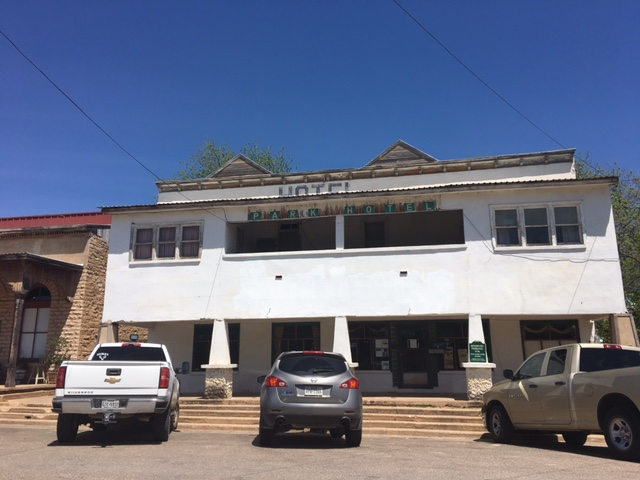
The Olde Park Hotel

- The Ballinger Park is a 55-acre park on the north and east shores of Lake Ballinger. This park houses a multipurpose sport complex, the Mickey Corso Community Clubhouse, a 42-acre natural park area, and a boat launch. The sports complex consists of a full-length, multipurpose sports field used for baseball, softball, and soccer. The playground amenities include two play structures and picnic tables. The natural park area is a former nine-hole golf course converted to a natural area with nature trails and ponds, and is adjacent to the Interurban Trail to the west and the Lakeview Trail to the east. A master plan for this area of the park was adopted in 2015.

== Gallery ==
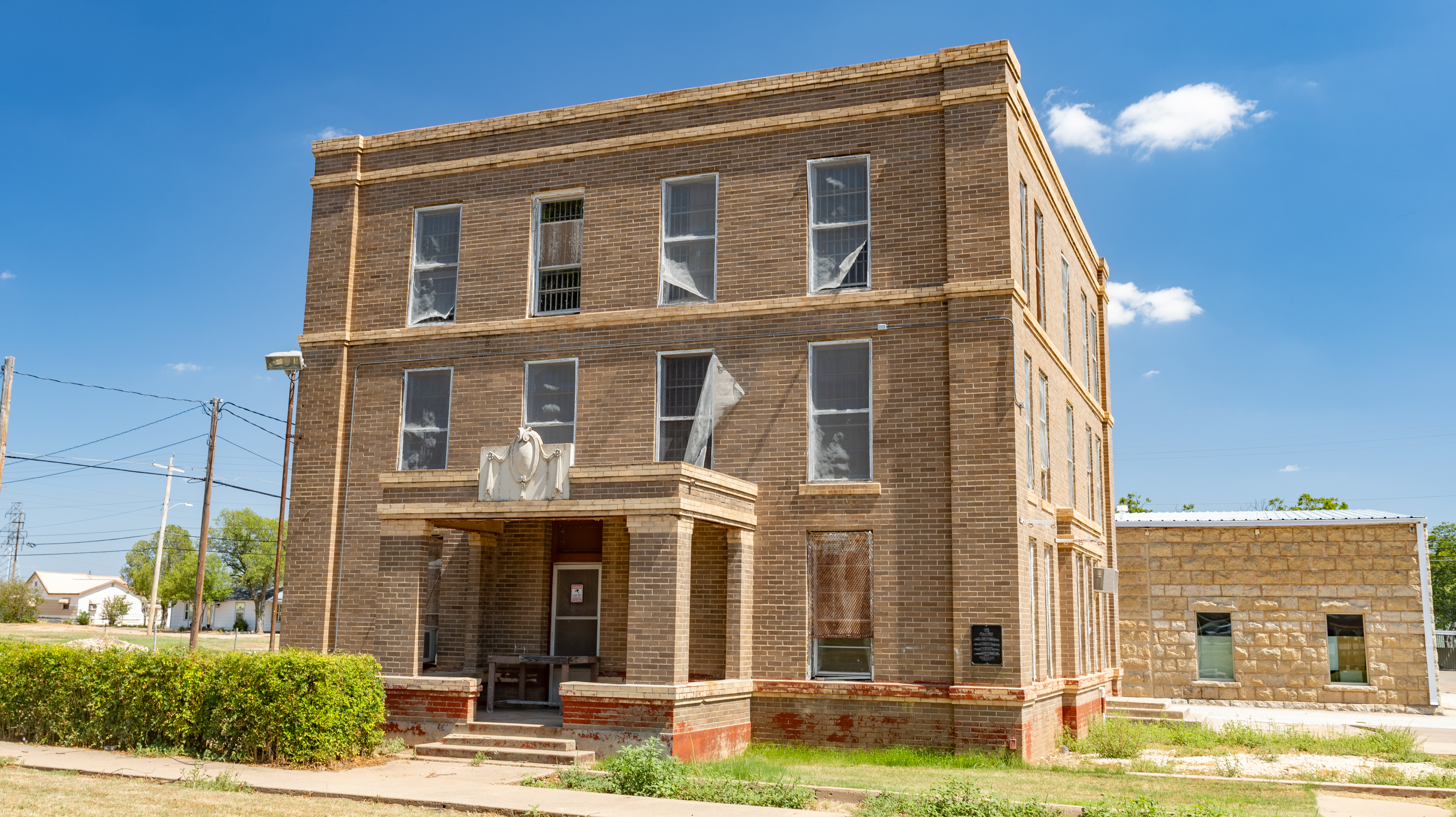
County Building

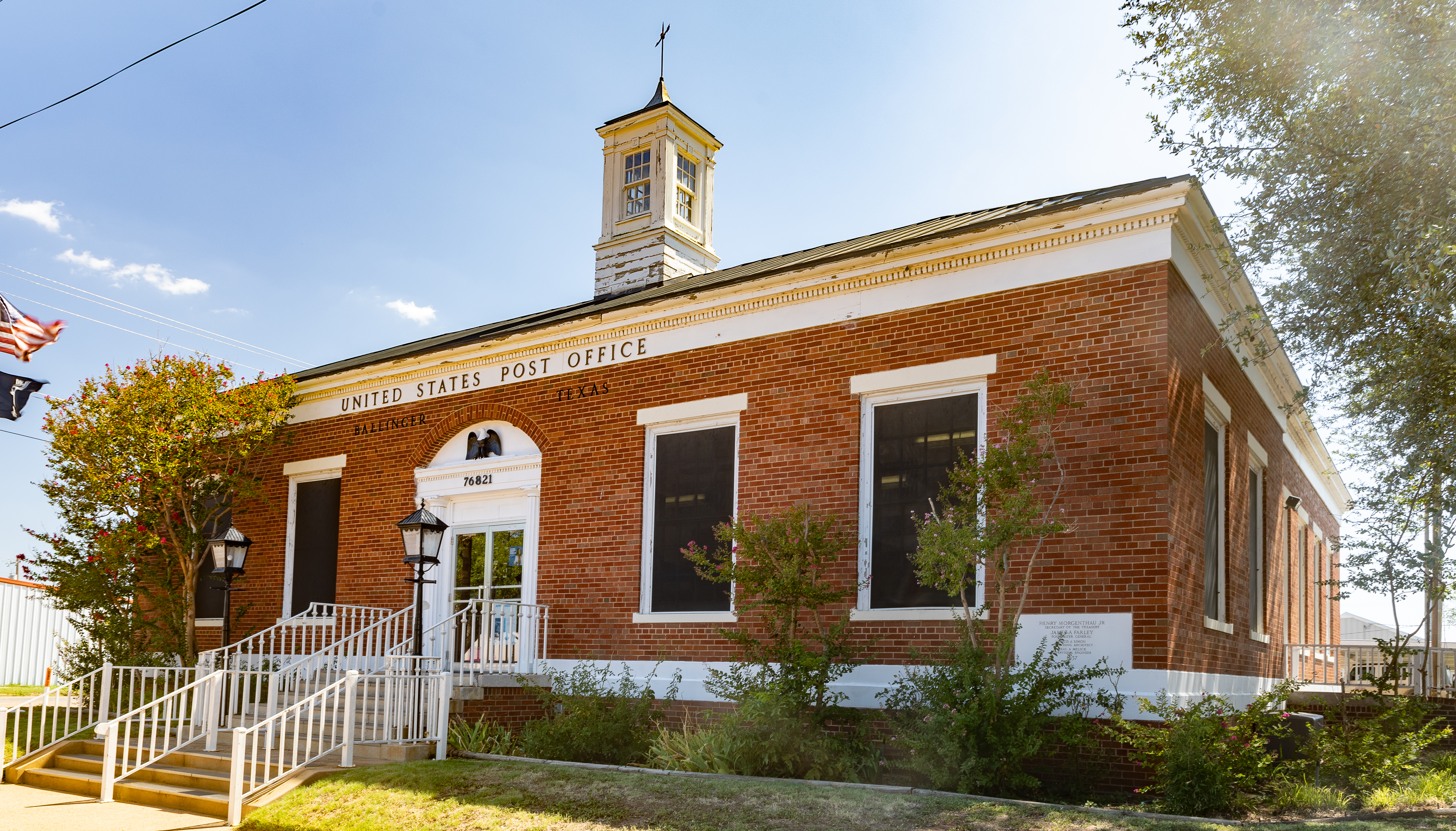
Historic post office in Ballinger, Texas

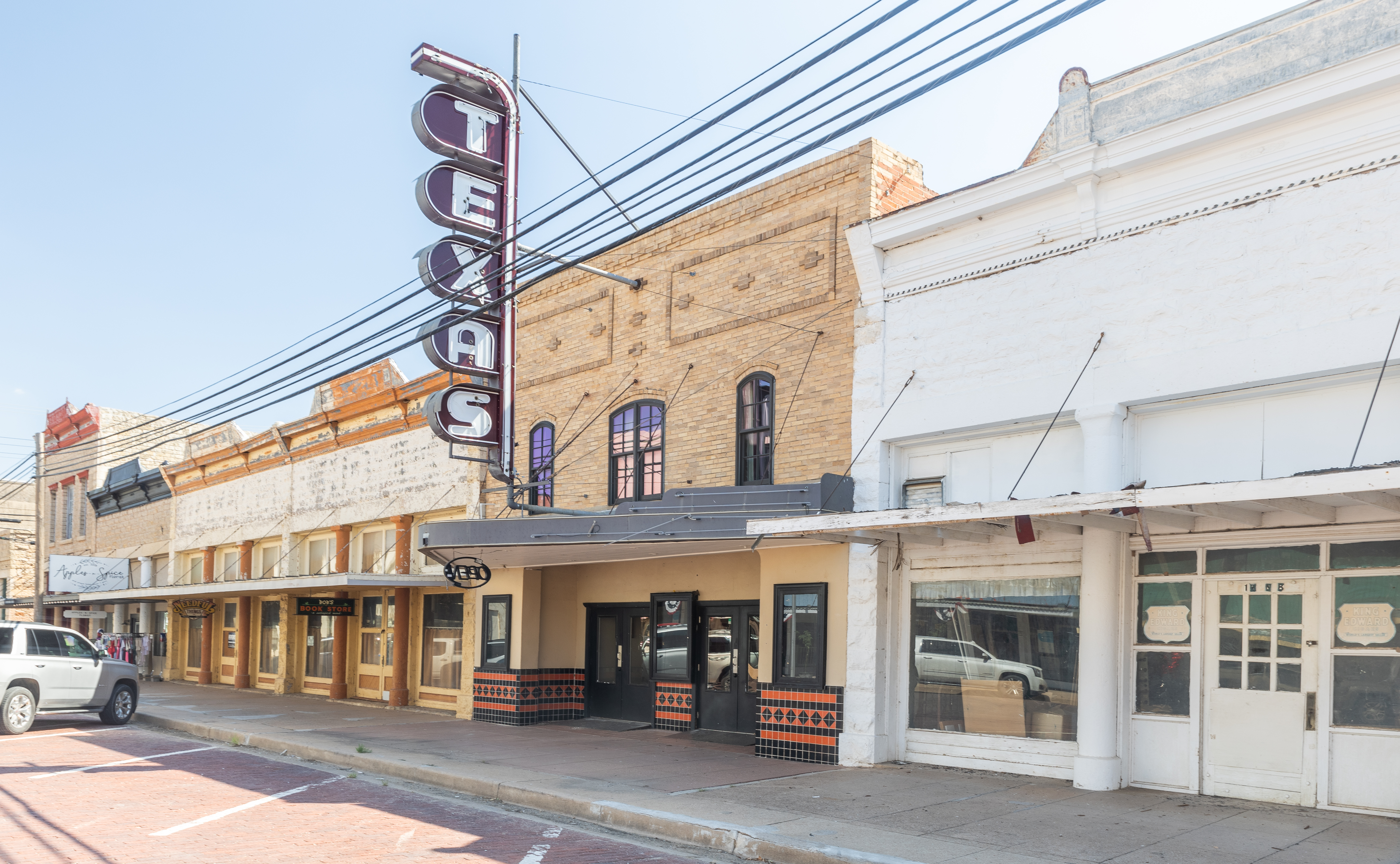
Texas Theater

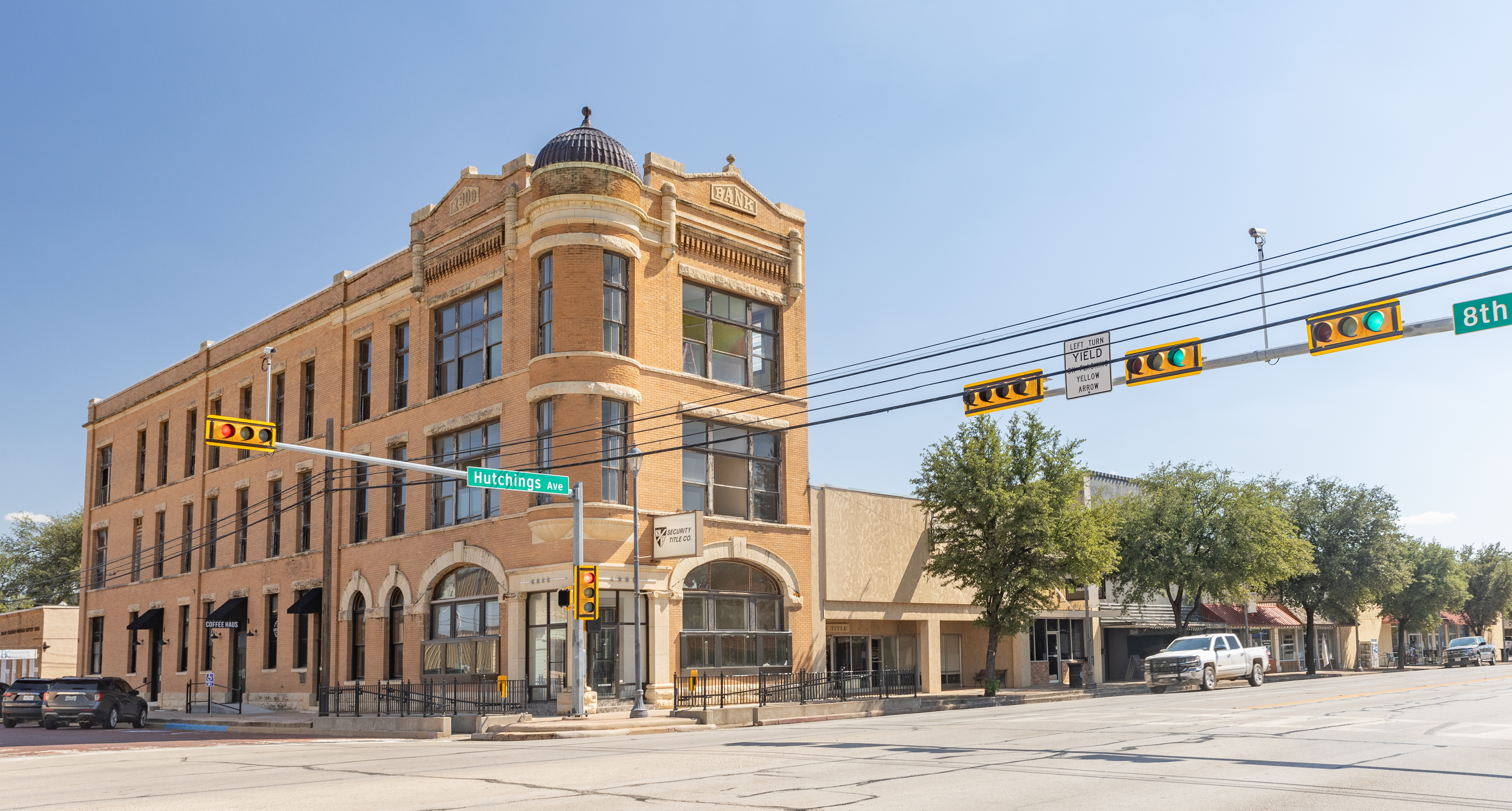
Downtown Ballinger

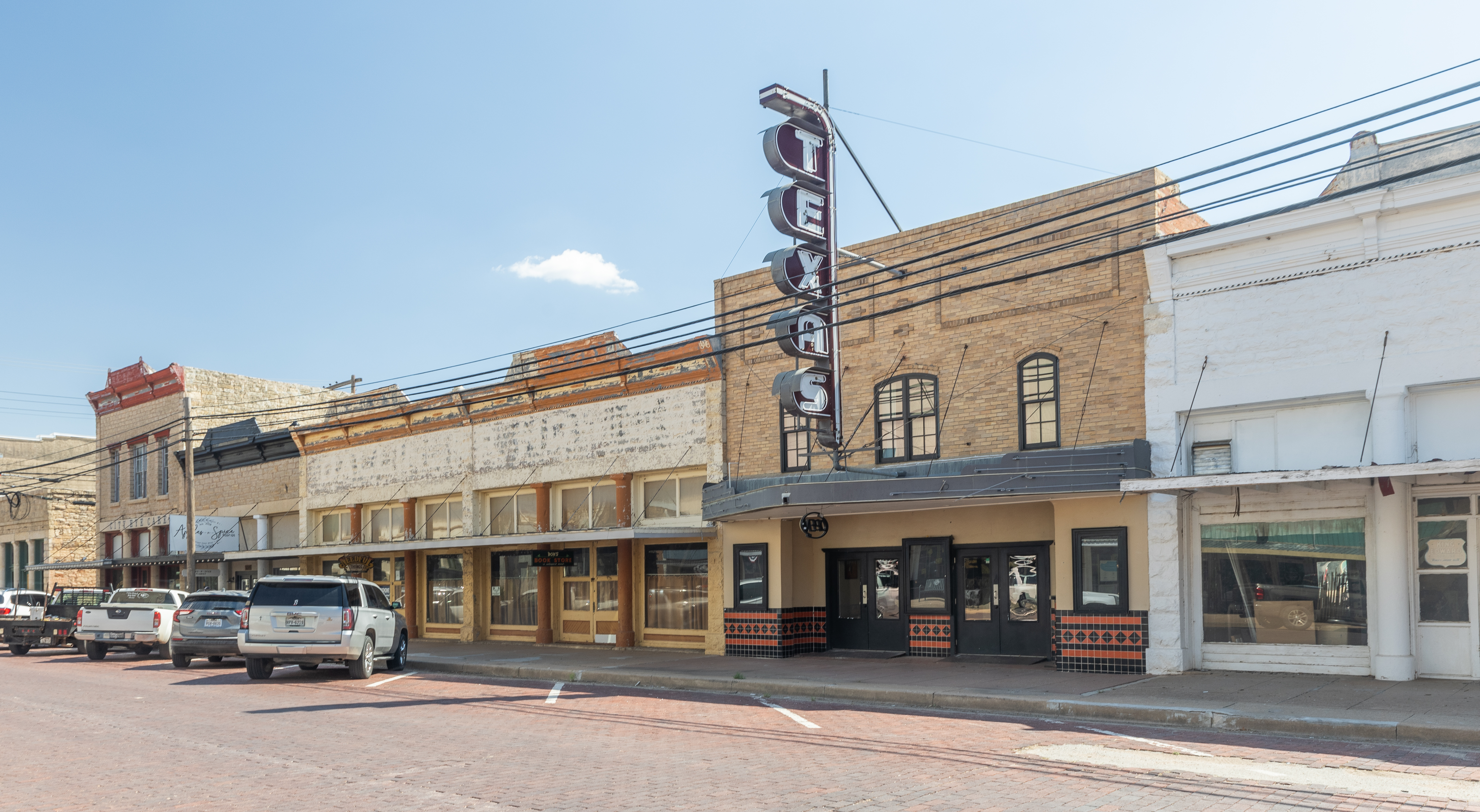
Downtown Ballinger

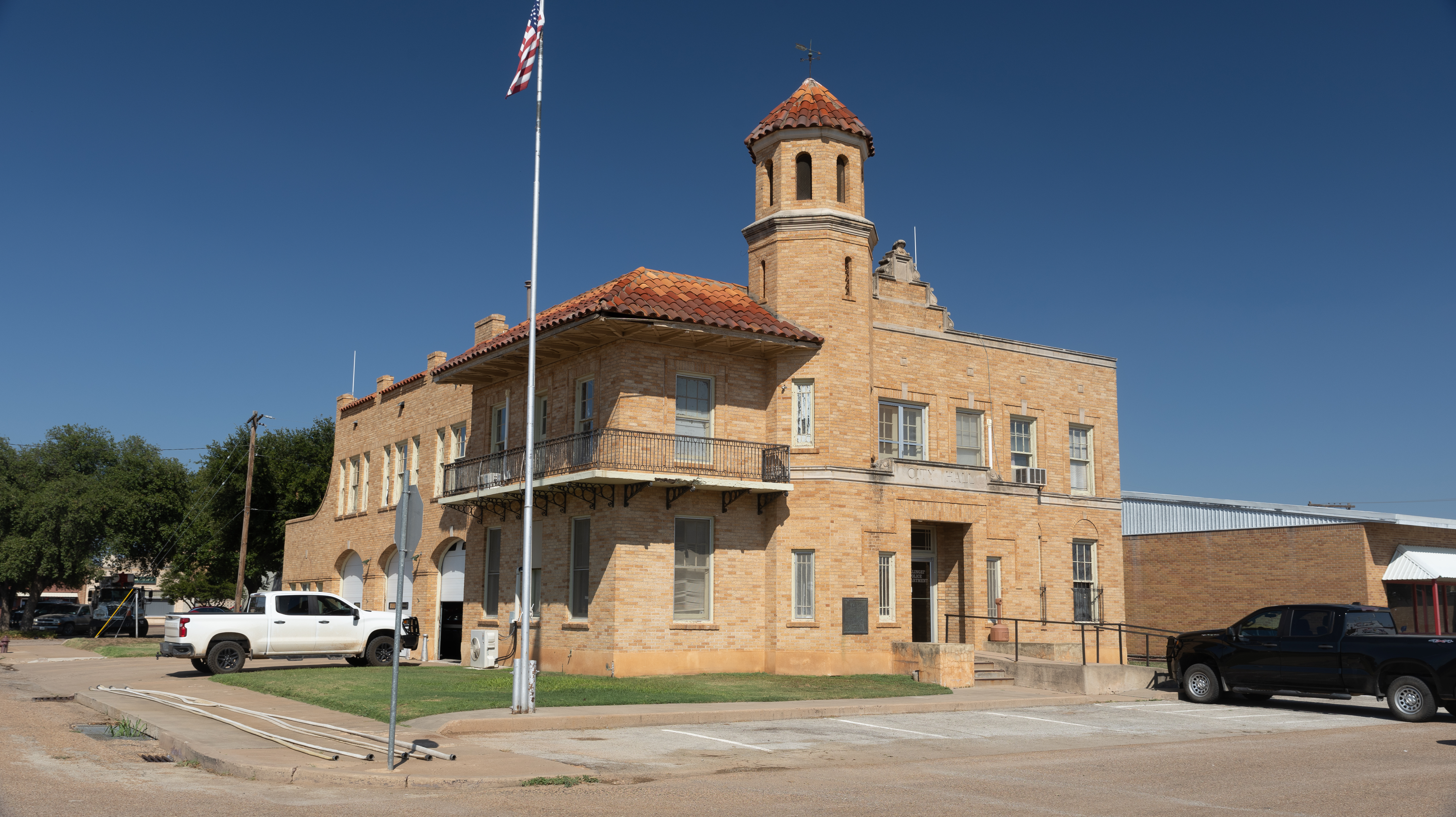
City Hall

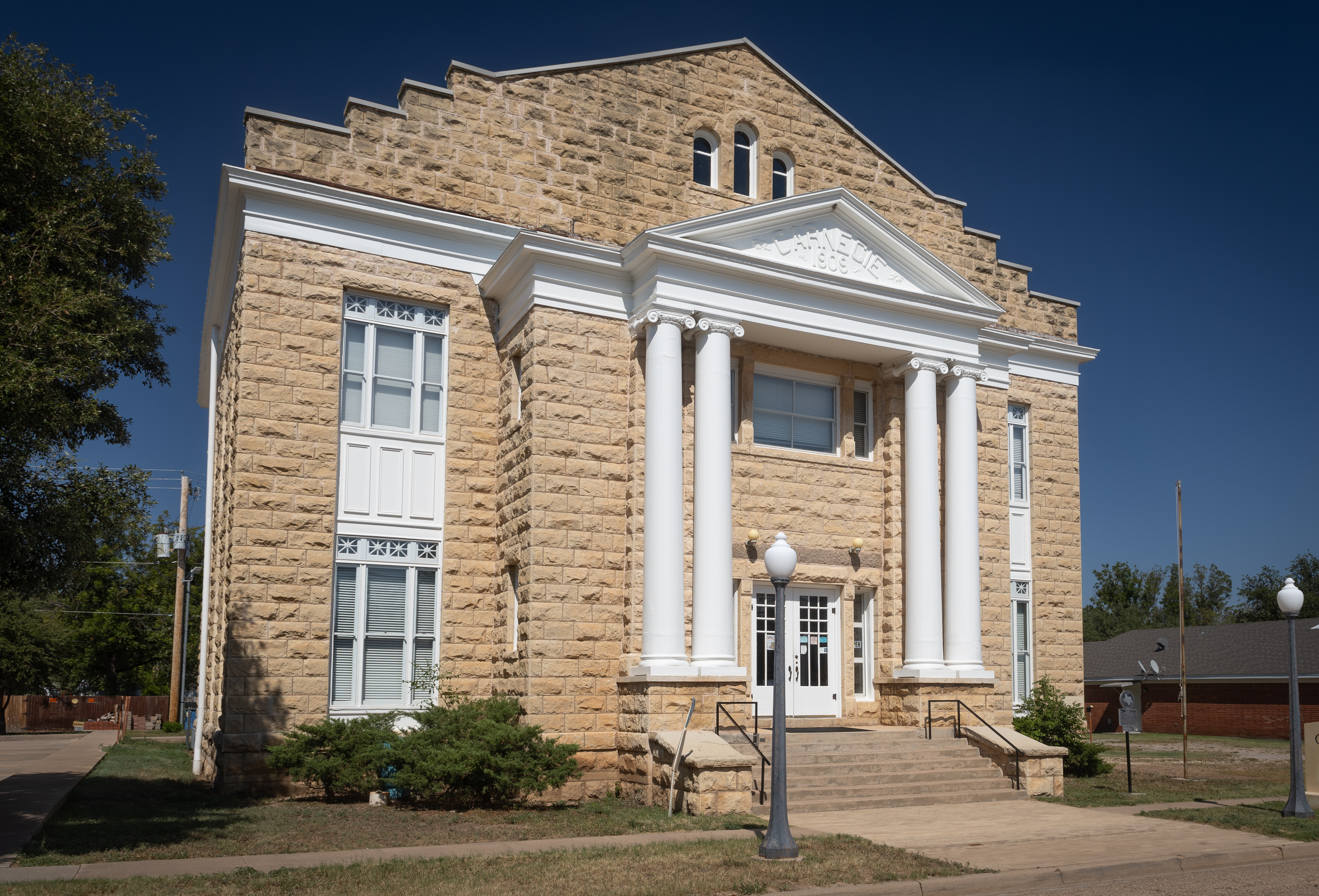
Carnigie Library Ballinger
