= Rowena, Texas =

Unincorporated community in Texas, US

Coordinates: 31°38′39″N 100°02′53″W

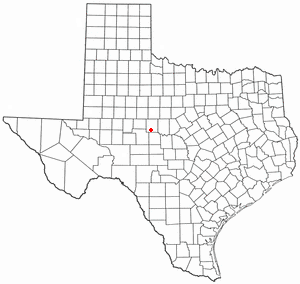
Location of Rowena in Texas

Rowena is an unincorporated community and census designated place (CDP) in southwestern Runnels County, Texas, United States, designed by Paul J. Baron in 1898. As of the 2020 census, Rowena had a population of 305. The elevation is 1759 feet above sea level.

== Demographics ==
Historical population
Census	Pop.	Note	%±
2020	305		—
U.S. Decennial Census; 1850–1900 1910; 1920 1930 1940; 1950 1960 1970; 1980 1990 2000; 2010 2020

Rowena first appeared as a census designated place in the 2020 U.S. census.

=== 2020 census ===
Rowena CDP, Texas – Racial and ethnic composition Note: the US Census treats Hispanic/Latino as an ethnic category. This table excludes Latinos from the racial categories and assigns them to a separate category. Hispanics/Latinos may be of any race.
Race / Ethnicity (NH = Non-Hispanic)	Pop 2020	% 2020
White alone (NH)	236	77.38%
Black or African American alone (NH)	1	0.33%
Native American or Alaska Native alone (NH)	1	0.33%
Multiracial (NH)	8	2.62%
Hispanic or Latino (any race)	59	19.34%
Total	305	100.00%

== Notable people ==
- Bonnie Parker (1910–1934), born in Rowena, was an outlaw who traveled the Central United States during the Great Depression in the early 1930s.
