= Winters Independent School District =

School district in Texas

Winters Independent School District is a public school district based in Winters, Texas, United States. While located in Runnels County, the district extends into a small portion of Taylor County.

In 2009, the school district was rated "academically acceptable" by the Texas Education Agency. The school mascot is the Blizzard.

== History ==
On July 1, 1991, it absorbed the Wingate Independent School District.

On April 10, 1930, the first Texas chapter for the national organization of the Future Farmers of America Club was started in Winters.

The district changed to a four-day school week in fall 2022.

== Controversy ==
In July 2024, the ACLU of Texas sent Winters Independent School District a letter, alleging that the district's 2023–2024 dress and grooming code appeared to violate the Texas CROWN Act, a state law which prohibits racial discrimination based on hair texture or styles. They asked the district to revise its policies for the 2024-2025 school year.
