= Winters, Texas =

- City
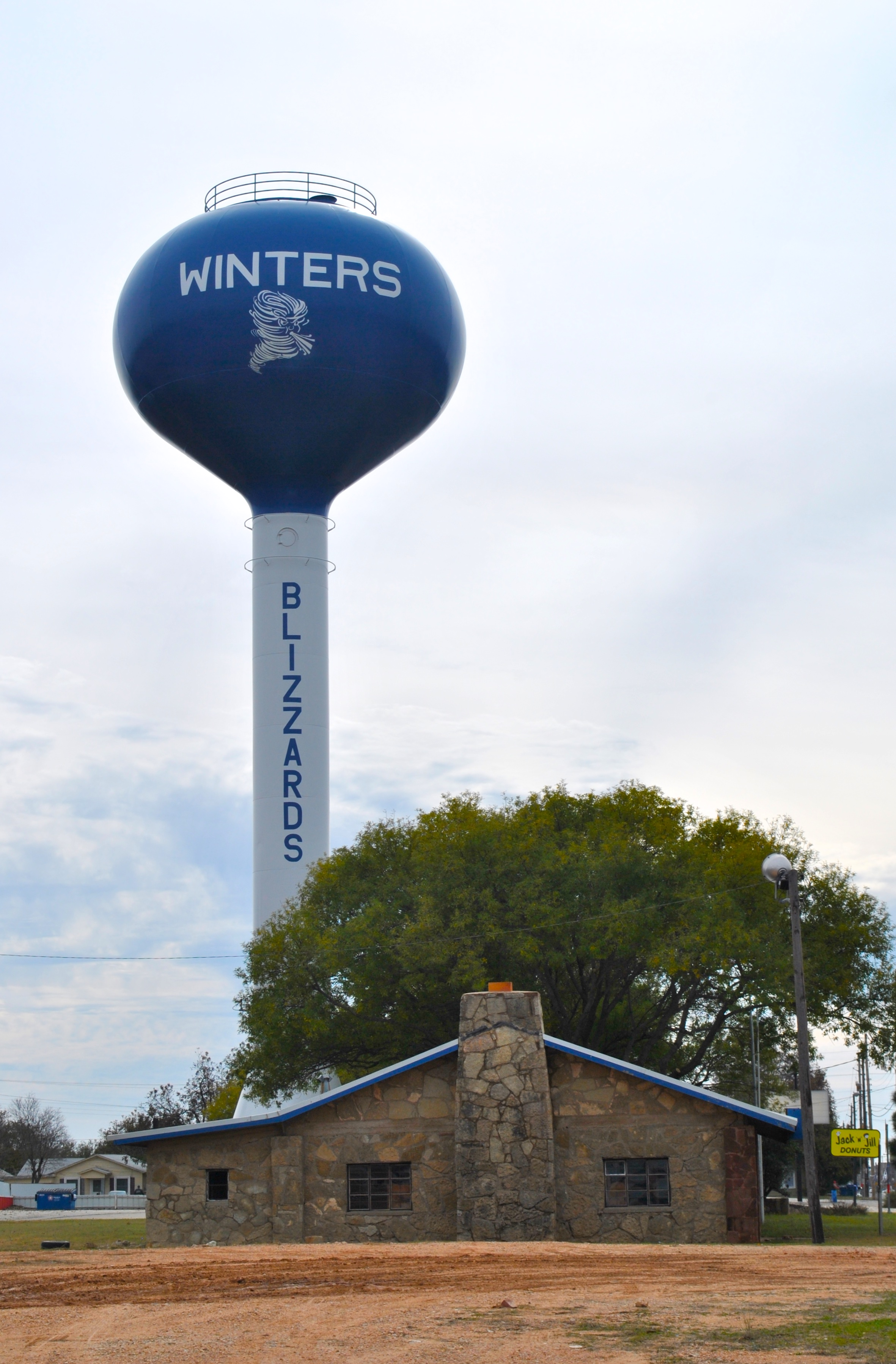

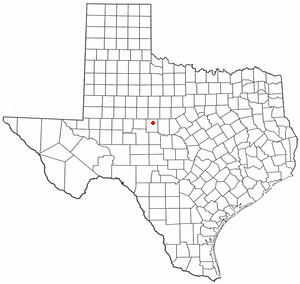
- Location of Winters, Texas

- Coordinates: 31°57′20″N 99°57′12″W
- Country: United States
- State: Texas
- County: Runnels

Area
  - Total: 2.94 sq mi (7.62 km^{2})
  - Land: 2.36 sq mi (6.10 km^{2})
  - Water: 0.59 sq mi (1.52 km^{2})
- Elevation: 1,847 ft (563 m)

Population (2020)
  - Total: 2,345
  - Density: 996/sq mi (384/km^{2})
- Time zone: UTC-6 (Central (CST))
  - Summer (DST): UTC-5 (CDT)
- ZIP code: 79567
- Area code: 325
- FIPS code: 48-79876
- GNIS feature ID: 2412289
- Website: www.cityofwinters.net

Winters is a city in Runnels County, Texas, United States. The population was 2,345 at the 2020 census.

== Geography ==
Winters is located at the junction of U.S. Highway 83 and Farm Roads 53 and 1770 in north-central Runnels County, approximately 41 miles (66 km) south of Abilene and 52 miles (84 km) northeast of San Angelo.

According to the United States Census Bureau, the city has a total area of 2.9 square miles (7.6 km^{2}), of which 2.4 square miles (6.1 km^{2}) are land and 0.58 square miles (1.5 km^{2}), or 19.97%, are covered by water.

=== Climate ===
The climate in this area is characterized by hot, humid summers and generally mild to cool winters. According to the Köppen climate classification system, Winters has a humid subtropical climate, Cfa on climate maps.

== History ==
In 1880, the families of C.N. Curry and C.E. Bell settled in an area known as Bluff Creek Valley, southwest of the present town. Local cowboy Jack Mackey suggested that the community be named in honor of John N. Winters, a rancher and land agent. A post office was established in 1891 and Mr. Winters donated land for a school soon after. Winters had roughly 163 residents in 1892. It became famous for a traveling brass band that was organized by Charles Tipton Grant in 1901. A newspaper began publishing in 1903. Winters incorporated in 1909, the same year that the Abilene and Southern Railway built an extension from Abilene to Winters. Land values in the city jumped to $7.00 per acre. A cottonseed mill became the first major industry in Winters when it opened in 1909. It remained in operation until 1939. In 1910, the population had risen to 1,247. A public library was constructed in 1964. By 1980, the population stood at 3,061. That number fell slightly to 2,905 in 1990 and 2,880 in 2000. Winters had a total of 140 businesses in 2000, up from 96 in 1970. Today, the city serves as a commercial and distribution center for a large agricultural and ranching area.

== Demographics ==
Historical population
Census	Pop.	Note	%±
1910	1,347		—
1920	1,509		12.0%
1930	2,423		60.6%
1940	2,335		−3.6%
1950	2,676		14.6%
1960	3,266		22.0%
1970	2,907		−11.0%
1980	3,061		5.3%
1990	2,905		−5.1%
2000	2,880		−0.9%
2010	2,562		−11.0%
2020	2,345		−8.5%
U.S. Decennial Census

=== 2020 census ===
As of the 2020 census, Winters had a population of 2,345. The median age was 40.8 years, with 24.7% of residents under the age of 18 and 20.9% of residents 65 years of age or older. For every 100 females there were 94.6 males, and for every 100 females age 18 and over there were 90.8 males age 18 and over.

0.0% of residents lived in urban areas, while 100.0% lived in rural areas.

There were 952 households in Winters, of which 30.1% had children under the age of 18 living in them. Of all households, 44.7% were married-couple households, 20.8% were households with a male householder and no spouse or partner present, and 27.8% were households with a female householder and no spouse or partner present. About 31.8% of all households were made up of individuals and 16.2% had someone living alone who was 65 years of age or older. The census recorded 610 families residing in the city.

There were 1,186 housing units, of which 19.7% were vacant. The homeowner vacancy rate was 3.9% and the rental vacancy rate was 20.9%.

Racial composition as of the 2020 census
Race	Number	Percent
White	1,677	71.5%
Black or African American	46	2.0%
American Indian and Alaska Native	23	1.0%
Asian	3	0.1%
Native Hawaiian and Other Pacific Islander	1	0.0%
Some other race	296	12.6%
Two or more races	299	12.8%
Hispanic or Latino (of any race)	1,094	46.7%

=== 2000 census ===
As of the census of 2000, 2,880 people, 1,082 households, and 750 families resided in the city. The population density was 1,280.7 inhabitants per square mile (494.5/km^{2}). The 1,251 housing units averaged 556.3 per square mile (214.7/km^{2}). The racial makeup of the city was 76.04% White, 2.05% African American, 0.94% Native American, 0.28% Asian, 0.07% Pacific Islander, 18.58% from other races, and 2.05% from two or more races. Hispanics or Latinos of any race were 39.24% of the population.

Of the 1,082 households, 34.6% had children under the age of 18 living with them, 52.1% were married couples living together, 12.0% had a female householder with no husband present, and 30.6% were not families. About 27.7% of all households were made up of individuals, and 16.8% had someone living alone who was 65 years of age or older. The average household size was 2.62 and the average family size was 3.21.

In the city, the population was distributed as 30.3% under the age of 18, 8.2% from 18 to 24, 23.2% from 25 to 44, 20.7% from 45 to 64, and 17.7% who were 65 years of age or older. The median age was 35 years. For every 100 females, there were 88.0 males. For every 100 females age 18 and over, there were 81.5 males.

The median income for a household in the city was $25,587, and for a family was $30,000. Males had a median income of $27,112 versus $18,438 for females. The per capita income for the city was $11,030. About 20.6% of families and 26.7% of the population were below the poverty line, including 38.0% of those under age 18 and 16.5% of those age 65 or over.

== Attractions ==
The Z.I. Hale Museum, housed in the former clinic of a prominent local optometrist, features exhibits of area history, photographs, and documents. A Missouri-Pacific caboose sits outside of the museum.

W. Lee Colburn Park is located 7 miles (11 km) east of Winters, adjacent to Elm Creek Reservoir. The park has various recreational facilities and 14 spaces for RVs with full hookups.

Every year, on the 1st Saturday of September, Winters celebrates the opening of dove hunting season with "Dovefest". people come from all over to hunt, listen to live music, or attend the gun show.

== Education ==
Public education in the city of Winters is provided by the Winters Independent School District. The district has three campuses – Winters Elementary School (grades Pre-K–5), Winters Junior High School (grades 6–8), and Winters High School (grades 9–12).

== Notable people ==
- Geoff Connor, 104th Texas Secretary of State, was born and raised in Winters
- Rogers Hornsby, Major League Baseball great, was born in Winters on April 27, 1896
- Del Shores, film director and producer was born in Winters.
