= Runnels County, Texas =

County in Texas, United States

- County
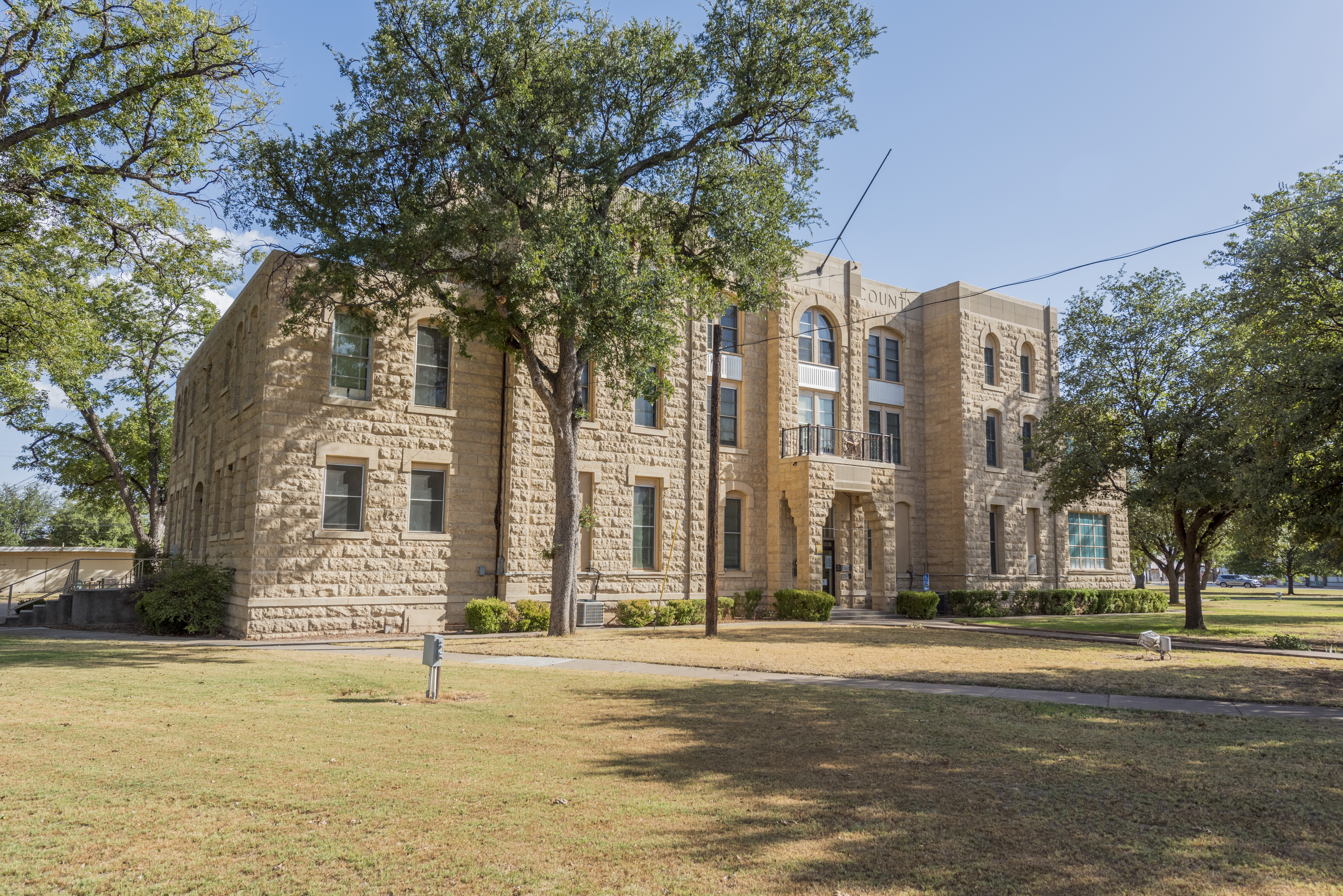
- The Runnels County Courthouse in Ballinger

- Location within the U.S. state of Texas
- Coordinates: 31°50′N 99°58′W
- Country: United States
- State: Texas
- Founded: 1880
- Named for: Hiram G. Runnels
- Seat: Ballinger
- Largest city: Ballinger

Area
  - Total: 1,057 sq mi (2,740 km^{2})
  - Land: 1,051 sq mi (2,720 km^{2})
  - Water: 6.2 sq mi (16 km^{2}) 0.6%

Population (2020)
  - Total: 9,900
  - Estimate (2025): 9,693 ▼
  - Density: 9.4/sq mi (3.6/km^{2})
- Time zone: UTC−6 (Central)
  - Summer (DST): UTC−5 (CDT)
- Congressional district: 11th
- Website: www.runnelscounty.org

Runnels County is a county located in the U.S. state of Texas. As of the 2020 census, its population was 9,900. Its county seat is Ballinger. The county was created in 1858 and later organized in 1880. It is named for Hiram G. Runnels, a Texas state legislator.

== History ==
The original inhabitants of the area were the Jumano, followed by the Comanche. In 1683–84, Juan Domínguez de Mendoza established a short-lived mission. Fort Chadbourne was established in 1852, as part of a chain of forts in West Texas. Runnels County was formed from Bexar and Travis Counties. It was named in honor of Hiram G. Runnels. Runnels City was the original county seat.

In 1862, Pickettville was established by Mr. and Mrs. John Guest and their three sons, Henry and Robert K. Wylie and their cowboys and a black servant, and Mrs. Felicia Gordon and her five sons. Ballinger was settled by Richard Coffey and family.

The county was organized in 1880, with a population of 980. Ballinger, namesake of William Pitt Ballinger, was selected as the new county seat eight years later. The stone county courthouse was erected in the Second Empire style soon after (1889). Architect Eugene T. Heiner designed the building.

In 1899, the community of Pumphrey, originally named New Hope, was established by William M. Pumphrey. The Santa Fe Depot was built in 1911 by the Atchison, Topeka and Santa Fe Railroad. The Ballinger Carnegie Library in Ballinger was dedicated. The Charles H. Noyes statue on the Ballinger Courthouse lawn, dedicated to the "Spirit of the Texas Cowboy", was sculpted by Pompeo Coppini in 1919.

The MacMillan oil field was discovered near Ballinger in 1927. Eighteen new oil fields were explored by 1949.

== Geography ==
According to the U.S. Census Bureau, the county has a total area of 1,057 square miles (2,740 km^{2}), of which 6.2 square miles (16 km^{2}), 0.6%, are covered by water.

=== Major highways ===
- U.S. Highway 67
- U.S. Highway 83
- U.S. Highway 277
- State Highway 153
- State Highway 158
- Loop 438

=== Adjacent counties ===
- Taylor County (north)
- Coleman County (east)
- Concho County (south)
- Tom Green County (southwest)
- Coke County (west)
- Nolan County (northwest)

== Demographics ==
Historical population
| Census | Pop. | Note | %± |
|---|---|---|---|
| 1880 | 980 | | — |
| 1890 | 3,193 | | 225.8% |
| 1900 | 5,379 | | 68.5% |
| 1910 | 20,858 | | 287.8% |
| 1920 | 17,074 | | −18.1% |
| 1930 | 21,821 | | 27.8% |
| 1940 | 18,903 | | −13.4% |
| 1950 | 16,771 | | −11.3% |
| 1960 | 15,016 | | −10.5% |
| 1970 | 12,108 | | −19.4% |
| 1980 | 11,872 | | −1.9% |
| 1990 | 11,294 | | −4.9% |
| 2000 | 11,495 | | 1.8% |
| 2010 | 10,501 | | −8.6% |
| 2020 | 9,900 | | −5.7% |
| 2025 (est.) | 9,693 | ▼ | −2.1% |
U.S. Decennial Census; 1850–2010 2010 2020

=== Racial and ethnic composition ===
Runnels County, Texas – Racial and ethnic composition Note: the US Census treats Hispanic/Latino as an ethnic category. This table excludes Latinos from the racial categories and assigns them to a separate category. Hispanics/Latinos may be of any race.
| Race / Ethnicity (NH = Non-Hispanic) | Pop 1980 | Pop 1990 | Pop 2000 | Pop 2010 | Pop 2020 | % 1980 | % 1990 | % 2000 | % 2010 | % 2020 |
|---|---|---|---|---|---|---|---|---|---|---|
| White alone (NH) | 9,323 | 8,340 | 7,793 | 6,841 | 6,062 | 78.53% | 73.84% | 67.79% | 65.15% | 61.23% |
| Black or African American alone (NH) | 200 | 181 | 154 | 165 | 132 | 1.68% | 1.60% | 1.34% | 1.57% | 1.33% |
| Native American or Alaska Native alone (NH) | 15 | 11 | 30 | 43 | 39 | 0.13% | 0.10% | 0.26% | 0.41% | 0.39% |
| Asian alone (NH) | 22 | 15 | 37 | 19 | 24 | 0.19% | 0.13% | 0.32% | 0.18% | 0.24% |
| Native Hawaiian or Pacific Islander alone (NH) | x | x | 2 | 0 | 6 | x | x | 0.02% | 0.00% | 0.06% |
| Other race alone (NH) | 11 | 7 | 7 | 15 | 15 | 0.09% | 0.06% | 0.06% | 0.14% | 0.15% |
| Multiracial (NH) | x | x | 100 | 57 | 268 | x | x | 0.87% | 0.54% | 2.71% |
| Hispanic or Latino (any race) | 2,301 | 2,740 | 3,372 | 3,361 | 3,354 | 19.38% | 24.26% | 29.33% | 32.01% | 33.88% |
| Total | 11,872 | 11,294 | 11,495 | 10,501 | 9,900 | 100.00% | 100.00% | 100.00% | 100.00% | 100.00% |

=== 2020 census ===
As of the 2020 census, the county had a population of 9,900. The median age was 44.6 years; 22.9% of residents were under 18 and 23.1% were 65 or older. For every 100 females, there were 98.7 males, and for every 100 females 18 and over, there were 95.5 males age and over.

The racial makeup of the county was 75.6% White, 1.5% Black or African American, 0.9% American Indian and Alaska Native, 0.2% Asian, 0.1% Native Hawaiian and Pacific Islander, 9.6% from some other race, and 12.1% from two or more races. Hispanic or Latino residents of any race comprised 33.9% of the population.

About 0.1% of residents lived in urban areas, while almost all lived in rural areas.

Of the 3,953 households in the county, 29.9% had children under 18 living in them, 50.9% were married-couple households, 18.6% were households with a male householder and no spouse or partner present, and 25.5% were households with a female householder and no spouse or partner present. About 28.2% of all households were made up of individuals, and 15.8% had someone living alone who was 65 or older.

The county had 4,986 housing units, of which 20.7% were vacant. Among occupied housing units, 76.2% were owner-occupied and 23.8% were renter-occupied. The homeowner vacancy rate was 2.3% and the rental vacancy rate was 14.8%.

=== 2000 census ===
As of the 2000 census, 11,495 people, 4,428 households, and 3,157 families were residing in the county. The population density was 11 people per square mile (4.2 people/km^{2}). The 5,400 housing units had an average density of 5 units per square mile (1.9/km^{2}). The racial makeup of the county was 81.44% White, 1.40% African American, 0.53% Native American, 0.32% Asian, 0.02% Pacific Islander, 14.31% from other races, and 1.98% from two or more races. About 29.33% of the population were Hispanics or Latinos of any race.

Of the 4,428 households, 31.4% had children under 18 living with them, 57.4% were married couples living together, 9.6% had a female householder with no husband present, and 28.7% were not families. About 26.7% of all households were made up of individuals, and 15.7% had someone living alone who was 65 or older. The average household size was 2.53, and the average family size was 3.06.

In the county, the age distribution was 26.9% under 18, 6.4% from 18 to 24, 24.2% from 25 to 44, 22.9% from 45 to 64, and 19.5% who were 65 or older. The median age was 39 years. For every 100 females, there were 92.90 males. For every 100 females 18 and over, there were 87.10 males.

The median income in the county for a household was $27,806 and for a family was $32,917. Males had a median income of $25,223 versus $18,988 for females. The per capita income for the county was $13,577. About 14.9% of families and 19.2% of the population were below the poverty line, including 25.1% of those under 18 and 19.0% of those 65 or over.

== Communities ==
=== Cities ===
- Ballinger (county seat)
- Miles
- Winters

=== Census-designated places ===
- Rowena
- Wingate

=== Unincorporated communities ===
- Benoit
- Norton

== Politics ==
United States presidential election results for Runnels County, Texas
| Year | Republican | | Democratic | | Third party(ies) | |
| Year | No. | % | No. | % | No. | % |
|---|---|---|---|---|---|---|
| 1912 | 56 | 3.85% | 1,117 | 76.82% | 281 | 19.33% |
| 1916 | 195 | 10.71% | 1,487 | 81.66% | 139 | 7.63% |
| 1920 | 332 | 17.90% | 1,197 | 64.53% | 326 | 17.57% |
| 1924 | 458 | 14.48% | 2,564 | 81.09% | 140 | 4.43% |
| 1928 | 1,645 | 52.26% | 1,494 | 47.46% | 9 | 0.29% |
| 1932 | 235 | 7.30% | 2,975 | 92.39% | 10 | 0.31% |
| 1936 | 313 | 9.44% | 2,985 | 89.99% | 19 | 0.57% |
| 1940 | 835 | 21.25% | 3,088 | 78.60% | 6 | 0.15% |
| 1944 | 685 | 18.09% | 2,657 | 70.16% | 445 | 11.75% |
| 1948 | 526 | 14.55% | 2,954 | 81.72% | 135 | 3.73% |
| 1952 | 2,622 | 58.53% | 1,853 | 41.36% | 5 | 0.11% |
| 1956 | 2,416 | 62.54% | 1,442 | 37.33% | 5 | 0.13% |
| 1960 | 2,128 | 52.22% | 1,938 | 47.56% | 9 | 0.22% |
| 1964 | 1,480 | 35.82% | 2,645 | 64.01% | 7 | 0.17% |
| 1968 | 1,707 | 44.65% | 1,448 | 37.88% | 668 | 17.47% |
| 1972 | 2,752 | 78.83% | 739 | 21.17% | 0 | 0.00% |
| 1976 | 2,203 | 51.45% | 2,068 | 48.30% | 11 | 0.26% |
| 1980 | 2,532 | 59.82% | 1,648 | 38.93% | 53 | 1.25% |
| 1984 | 2,968 | 71.06% | 1,179 | 28.23% | 30 | 0.72% |
| 1988 | 2,417 | 58.28% | 1,720 | 41.48% | 10 | 0.24% |
| 1992 | 1,653 | 38.09% | 1,401 | 32.28% | 1,286 | 29.63% |
| 1996 | 1,941 | 51.58% | 1,417 | 37.66% | 405 | 10.76% |
| 2000 | 3,020 | 74.64% | 969 | 23.95% | 57 | 1.41% |
| 2004 | 3,239 | 80.00% | 792 | 19.56% | 18 | 0.44% |
| 2008 | 3,118 | 80.63% | 720 | 18.62% | 29 | 0.75% |
| 2012 | 3,104 | 84.62% | 519 | 14.15% | 45 | 1.23% |
| 2016 | 3,250 | 85.93% | 453 | 11.98% | 79 | 2.09% |
| 2020 | 3,807 | 86.35% | 552 | 12.52% | 50 | 1.13% |
| 2024 | 3,580 | 88.26% | 452 | 11.14% | 24 | 0.59% |

United States Senate election results for Runnels County, Texas1
| Year | Republican | | Democratic | | Third party(ies) | |
| Year | No. | % | No. | % | No. | % |
|---|---|---|---|---|---|---|
| 2024 | 3,430 | 85.18% | 525 | 13.04% | 72 | 1.79% |

United States Senate election results for Runnels County, Texas2
| Year | Republican | | Democratic | | Third party(ies) | |
| Year | No. | % | No. | % | No. | % |
|---|---|---|---|---|---|---|
| 2020 | 3,722 | 86.50% | 515 | 11.97% | 66 | 1.53% |

Texas Gubernatorial election results for Runnels County
| Year | Republican | | Democratic | | Third party(ies) | |
| Year | No. | % | No. | % | No. | % |
|---|---|---|---|---|---|---|
| 2022 | 2,924 | 90.41% | 277 | 8.57% | 33 | 1.02% |

== Education ==
School districts include:

- Ballinger Independent School District
- Bronte Independent School District
- Coleman Independent School District
- Jim Ned Consolidated Independent School District
- Miles Independent School District
- Olfen Independent School District
- Panther Creek Consolidated Independent School District
- Winters Independent School District

The Texas Legislature designated the county as being in the Western Texas College District.

== See also ==
- National Register of Historic Places listings in Runnels County, Texas
- Recorded Texas Historic Landmarks in Runnels County
