= Blanket (disambiguation) =

A blanket is a large, usually rectangular piece of thick bedding material.

Blanket or blankets may also refer to:

== Types of blanket ==
- Afghan blanket, a coloured wool knitted or crocheted in geometric shapes
- Blanket sleeper, a one-piece, footed sleeping garment
- Electric blanket, an electrically heated bedding material
- Fire blanket, a device used to extinguish fires
- Hoover blanket (slang), newspaper used as a blanket by an impoverished person
- Saddle blanket, form of horse blanket used as a protective covering for beasts of burden
- Security blanket, any familiar object whose presence provides comfort or security to its owner
- Space blanket, a lightweight reflective material used to keep users warm

== Business ==
- Blanket loan, a type of loan used to fund the purchase of more than one piece of real property
- Blanket order, a purchase order for multiple delivery dates, used when there is a recurring need for expendable goods

== Art, entertainment, and media ==
- Blanket (album), a 2023 album by Kevin Abstract
- Blanket, an album by Urban Species or the title track
- Blankets (comics), a graphic novel by Craig Thompson
  - Blankets, an accompaniment album to Thompson's novel by American indie rock band Tracker
- Blanket (Fargo), an episode of the American television series Fargo

== Government and politics ==
- Blanket primary, the voting system employed in the United States
- Blanket protest, a Northern Irish prison protest held in the Maze prison by republican prisoners
- Blanketeers, a nickname given to the operatives involved in a public protest in 1817 England

== Places ==
- Blanket, Texas, United States
- Blanket Independent School District

== Plants and animals ==
- Blanket (grape), another name for the French wine grape Clairette blanche
- Blanket octopus, a species of octopus found in Northern Australia
- Gaillardia pulchella (also called: firewheel, Indian blanket, Indian blanketflower, or sundance), a short-lived annual plant native to the United States

== Earth science ==
- Blanket bog, a bog lying over much of the countryside, formed in cool and very wet climates
- Ejecta blanket, in geology, a layer of ejected material that surrounds an impact crater

== Other uses ==
- Blanket, nickname of Michael Jackson's third child
- Blanket fort, a childhood construction of blankets, bed sheets, pillows, and sofa cushions
- Blanket statement, a hasty generalization
- Blanket stitch, a sewing stitch, typically used to edge blankets
- Blanketing, interference caused by strong radio signals
- Breeding blanket, a key part of many proposed fusion reactor designs
- Markov blanket, a concept in machine learning
- Pigs in blankets, a bacon-wrapped sausage popular in the UK and Ireland
- Pigs in a blanket, a pastry-wrapped hot dog popular in the United States
- Smallpox blanket, an early biological warfare agent used against American Indians

== See also ==
- Horse blanket (disambiguation)
