= Brookesmith High School =

Location
- 13400 FM 586 South; Brookesmith, Texas 76827-0706; United States; 31.5478°N 99.1196°W

Information
- School type: Public high school
- Established: 1930
- School district: Brookesmith Independent School District
- Principal: Suzanne Boyington
- Teaching staff: 17.34 (FTE)
- Grades: PK-12
- Enrollment: 158 (2023–2024)
- Student to teacher ratio: 9.11
- Colors: Royal Blue, Gold & White
- Athletics conference: UIL Class A
- Mascot: Mustang/Lady Mustang
- Website: Brookesmith High School

Brookesmith High School is a public high school located in Brookesmith, Texas (USA) and classified as a 1A school by the UIL. It is part of the Brookesmith Independent School District located in southwestern Brown County. For the 2024-2025 school year, the school was given a "C" by the Texas Education Agency.

== Athletics ==
The Brookesmith Mustangs compete in these sports -

- Basketball
- Cross Country
- 6-Man Football
- Golf
- Tennis
- Track

== See also ==
- List of high schools in Texas
