= May High School =

Location
- 3400 County Road 411 East; May, Texas 76857; United States; 31.979123°N 98.924981°W

Information
- Other name: May High School & Junior High
- School type: Public high school
- School district: May Independent School District
- Principal: Tyler Williams
- Teaching staff: 13.11 (FTE)
- Grades: 7–12
- Enrollment: 129 (2023–2024)
- Student to teacher ratio: 9.84
- Colors: Green & White
- Athletics conference: UIL Class A
- Mascot: Tiger
- Yearbook: Tiger
- Website: www.mayisd.com

May High School, sometimes referred to as May High School & Junior High, is a public high school located in May, Texas, United States. It is classified as a 1A school by the UIL. It is part of the May Independent School District located in northeastern Brown County. For the 2024-2025 school year, the school was given a "C" by the Texas Education Agency.

== Athletics ==
The May Tigers compete in these sports:

- Baseball
- Basketball
- Cross Country
- 6-Man Football
- Track and Field
- Softball

=== State titles ===
- 6-Man Football
  - 1977(6M)
