= Lake Brownwood State Park =

State park in Texas, United States

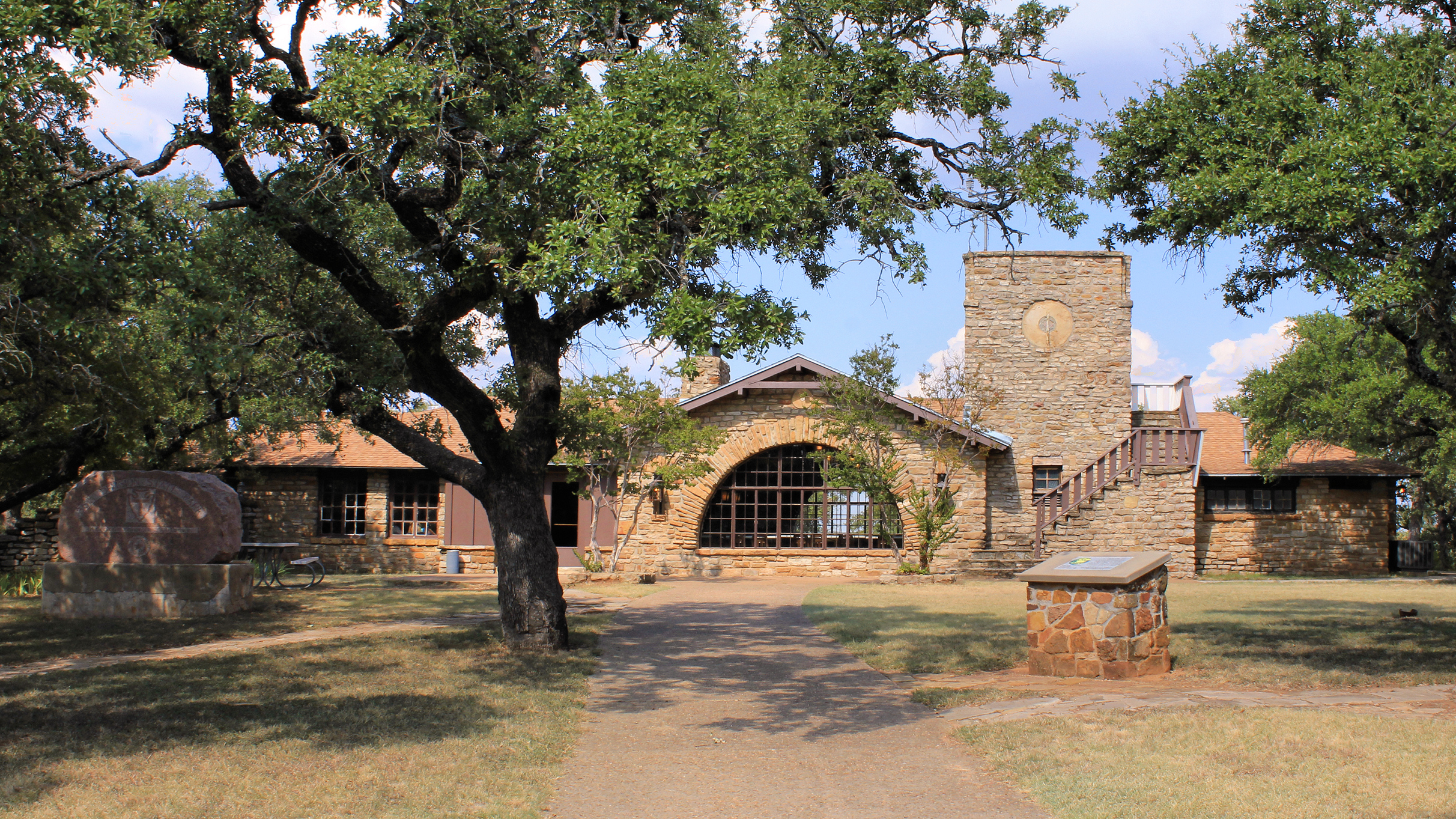
- The CCC built clubhouse

- Location within Texas
- Location: Brown County, Texas
- Nearest city: Brownwood
- Coordinates: 31°51′25″N 99°1′43″W
- Area: 1,406.5 acres (569 ha)
- Established: 1938
- Visitors: 74,766 (in 2025)
- Governing body: Texas Parks and Wildlife Department
- Website: Official site

Lake Brownwood State Park is a 1,406.5-acre (569.2 ha) state park located on the shore of Lake Brownwood in Brown County, Texas, United States, and is administered by the Texas Parks and Wildlife Department. The State of Texas acquired 537.5 acres (218 ha) by deed from Brown County Water Improvement District No. 1 in 1933. The Civilian Conservation Corps (CCC) developed the park between 1934 and 1942. The park opened in 1938. The state acquired an additional 869 acres (352 ha) from a private owner in 2023.

== History ==
The citizens of Brown County voted in 1926 to organize the Brown County Water Improvement District for the purpose of creating a reservoir to control flooding along Pecan Bayou. The dam was completed in 1932 and the reservoir filled the same year. In 1933, the Texas State Parks Board acquired the deed for the land for the state park from the water improvement district. Work began on the park in 1933 under work relief programs of the Civil Works Administration. The CCC took over when CCC Company 872 arrived in November 1934 and worked on the park for a year. CCC Company 849 arrived in October 1936 and remained at the park until 1942 when the camp was closed. The National Park Service designed the park and the CCC used locally quarried stone to build the recreation hall, cabins, benches, culverts, picnic tables and fire pits.

During World War II, the United States Army leased forty acres of land as a recreational area for soldiers stationed at Camp Bowie. The army built a 1,500-man camp with tents, basketball courts, tennis courts and a football field. To honor the soldiers, the State Parks Board changed the name of the park to the "36th Division State Park" between 1946 and 1956. The recreational area is now the Willow Point Campground.

== Nature ==
=== Animals ===
White-tailed deer, common raccoon, Mexican long-nosed armadillo, and fox squirrel are some mammal species found in the park. Fish in Lake Brownwood include white crappie, black crappie, bluegill, longear sunfish, channel catfish, blue catfish, largemouth bass and white bass.

Common birds include mallard, northern bobwhite, great blue heron turkey vulture, killdeer white-winged dove, mourning dove, eastern phoebe, ladder-backed woodpecker, blue jay, Carolina chickadee, black-crested titmouse, cactus wren, Bewick's wren, eastern bluebird, northern mockingbird, European starling, canyon towhee, rufous-crowned sparrow, northern cardinal, red-winged blackbird, brown-headed cowbird and house sparrow

== See also ==
- List of Texas state parks
