= Bangs High School =

Location
- 305 North Third Street; Bangs, Texas 76823-0969; United States; 31.7179°N 99.1309°W

Information
- School type: Public high school
- School district: Bangs Independent School District
- Principal: Scott Patrick
- Teaching staff: 26.80 (FTE)
- Grades: 9-12
- Enrollment: 242 (2023–2024)
- Student to teacher ratio: 9.03
- Colors: Kelly green and white
- Athletics conference: UIL Class 2A
- Mascot: Dragon/Lady Dragon
- Yearbook: Dragon
- Website: Bangs High School

Bangs High School is a public high school located in Bangs, Texas, and classified as a 2A school by the UIL. It is part of the Bangs Independent School District located in western Brown County. For the 2024-2025 school year, the school was given a "C" by the Texas Education Agency.

== Athletics ==
The Bangs Dragons compete in these sports -

- Baseball
- Basketball
- Cross Country
- Football
- Golf
- Powerlifting
- Softball
- Tennis
- Track and Field
- Volleyball

=== State Titles ===
- Boys Track
  - 1954(B), 1960(B)

==== State Finalists ====
- Football
  - 2002(2A/D1), 2003(2A/D2)

== Academics ==
From 2014–2017, Bangs High School has won their district UIL Academic Meet contest.

=== State Finalist/Titles ===
- State Congress
  - 2017
- Current Events
  - 4th place, 2017
- Ready Writing
  - State Champion, 2017
- One Act Play
  - State Second-Runner Up, 2017
