= Owens, Brown County, Texas =

Owens, Texas
- Unincorporated community
- Location within Texas Location within the United States
- Coordinates: 31°50′53″N 98°55′33″W
- Country: United States
- State: Texas
- County: Brown
- Elevation: 1,470 ft (450 m)
- Time zone: UTC-6 (Central (CST))
  - Summer (DST): UTC-5 (CDT)
- Area code: 325
- GNIS feature ID: 1378814

Owens is an unincorporated community in Brown County, Texas, United States. According to the Handbook of Texas, the community had no population estimates in 2000. It is located within the Brownwood, Texas micropolitan area.

== History ==
Owens was first settled in the early 1870s; the residents established a post office in 1878. The last population figures, from 1965, placed the town's population at sixty.

== Geography ==
Owens is located on U.S. Highway 183 and Farm to Market Road 3100, 8 mi (13 km) north of Brownwood in central Brown County.

== Education ==
Owens had its own school in the 1930s. Today, the community is served by the May Independent School District.
