= Indian Creek, Texas =

- Unincorporated community
- Location within Texas Location within the United States
- Coordinates: 31°31′24″N 98°58′48″W
- Country: United States
- State: Texas
- County: Brown
- Elevation: 1,326 ft (404 m)
- Time zone: UTC-6 (Central (CST))
  - Summer (DST): UTC-5 (CDT)
- ZIP Code: 76801
- Area code: 325
- GNIS feature ID: 1379985

Indian Creek is an unincorporated community in southern Brown County in west-central Texas, United States. According to the Handbook of Texas, there were no population estimates available for the community in 2000. It is located within the Brownwood, Texas micropolitan area.

== History ==
Indian Creek was named for its position along the banks of Indian Creek. In 1876 the local general store was repurposed as a post office, and by 1879 the community had two stores, a cotton gin, and a blacksmith shop. By 1945, there were two businesses and a church.

Historical population
Year	Pop.	±%
1945	60	—
1988	28	−53.3%

== Geography ==
Indian Creek is located on Farm to Market Road 586, 10 mi (16 km) south of Brownwood in southern Brown County.

== Education ==
In 1876, Indian Creek's first school was built. It continued to operate in 1945. Indian Creek joined the Brookesmith Independent School District in 1948-49. It continues to be served by Brookesmith ISD today.

Howard Payne University was started in Indian Creek in 1889, but later relocated to Brownwood.

== Notable person ==
- Katherine Anne Porter, writer and political activist
