= Lake Brownwood, Texas =

- Census-designated place
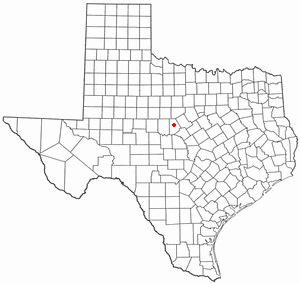
- Location of Lake Brownwood, Texas

- Coordinates: 31°49′08″N 99°06′57″W
- Country: United States
- State: Texas
- County: Brown

Area
  - Total: 6.8 sq mi (17.5 km^{2})
  - Land: 5.7 sq mi (14.7 km^{2})
  - Water: 1.1 sq mi (2.8 km^{2})
- Elevation: 1,483 ft (452 m)

Population (2020)
  - Total: 1,462
  - Density: 258/sq mi (99.5/km^{2})
- Time zone: UTC-6 (Central (CST))
  - Summer (DST): UTC-5 (CDT)
- ZIP code: 76801
- Area code: 325
- FIPS code: 48-40456
- GNIS feature ID: 2408534

Lake Brownwood is a census-designated place (CDP) located in Brown County in central Texas, United States. As of the 2020 census, Lake Brownwood had a population of 1,462.

== Geography ==
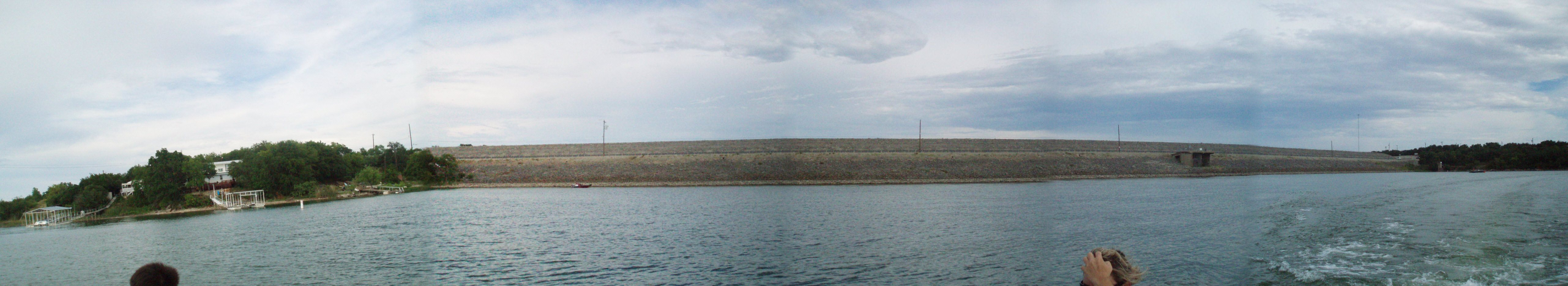
Lake Brownwood dam

The Lake Brownwood CDP is located in western Brown County along the western arm of Lake Brownwood, a reservoir on Jim Ned Creek and Pecan Bayou. The CDP is 13 miles (21 km) northwest of Brownwood, the county seat.

According to the United States Census Bureau, the CDP has a total area of 6.8 square miles (17.5 km^{2}), of which 5.7 square miles (14.7 km^{2}) are land and 1.1 square miles (2.8 km^{2}), or 15.77%, are covered by water.

== Demographics ==
Historical population
Census	Pop.	Note	%±
1990	1,221		—
2000	1,694		38.7%
2010	1,532		−9.6%
2020	1,462		−4.6%
U.S. Decennial Census; 1850–1900 1910; 1920 1930 1940; 1950 1960 1970; 1980 1990 2000; 2010 2020

Lake Brownwood first appeared as a census designated place in the 1990 U.S. census.

=== 2020 census ===
Lake Brownwood CDP, Texas – Racial and ethnic composition Note: the US Census treats Hispanic/Latino as an ethnic category. This table excludes Latinos from the racial categories and assigns them to a separate category. Hispanics/Latinos may be of any race.
Race / Ethnicity (NH = Non-Hispanic)	Pop 2000	Pop 2010	Pop 2020	% 2000	% 2010	% 2020
White alone (NH)	1,485	1,302	1,158	87.66%	84.99%	79.21%
Black or African American alone (NH)	25	11	32	1.48%	0.72%	2.19%
Native American or Alaska Native alone (NH)	7	2	11	0.41%	0.13%	0.75%
Asian alone (NH)	0	0	7	0.00%	0.00%	0.48%
Native Hawaiian or Pacific Islander alone (NH)	1	1	0	0.06%	0.07%	0.00%
Other race alone (NH)	0	0	1	0.00%	0.00%	0.07%
Mixed race or Multiracial (NH)	24	22	39	1.42%	1.44%	2.67%
Hispanic or Latino (any race)	152	194	214	8.97%	12.66%	14.64%
Total	1,694	1,532	1,462	100.00%	100.00%	100.00%

As of the 2020 United States census, there were 1,462 people, 580 households, and 347 families residing in the CDP.

=== 2000 census ===
As of the census of 2000, 1,694 people, 723 households, and 493 families resided in the CDP. The population density was 295.9 inhabitants per square mile (114.2/km^{2}). The 1,043 housing units averaged 182.2 per square mile (70.4/km^{2}). The racial makeup of the CDP was 89.49% White, 1.48% African American, 0.53% Native American, 0.06% Pacific Islander, 6.20% from other races, and 2.24% from two or more races. Hispanics or Latinos of any race were 8.97% of the population.

Of the 723 households, 25.3% had children under the age of 18 living with them, 56.4% were married couples living together, 9.1% had a female householder with no husband present, and 31.7% were not families. About 27.7% of all households were made up of individuals, and 11.3% had someone living alone who was 65 years of age or older. The average household size was 2.34 and the average family size was 2.80.

In the CDP, the population was distributed as 23.0% under the age of 18, 7.1% from 18 to 24, 24.3% from 25 to 44, 28.7% from 45 to 64, and 16.9% who were 65 years of age or older. The median age was 42 years. For every 100 females, there were 102.9 males. For every 100 females age 18 and over, there were 98.6 males.

The median income for a household in the CDP was $26,286, and for a family was $29,280. Males had a median income of $25,380 versus $17,946 for females. The per capita income for the CDP was $13,289. About 18.4% of families and 17.7% of the population were below the poverty line, including 25.2% of those under age 18 and 8.9% of those age 65 or over.
