= Blanket High School =

Location
- 901 Avenue H Blanket, Texas 76432-9756; United States; 31.8211°N 98.7926°W

Information
- School type: Public high school
- Established: 1906
- School district: Blanket Independent School District
- Principal: Kay Ribble
- Teaching staff: 14.98 (FTE)
- Grades: PK-12
- Enrollment: 166 (2024–2025)
- Student to teacher ratio: 11.08
- Colors: Black & Gold
- Athletics conference: UIL Class A
- Mascot: Tiger
- Website: Blanket High School

Blanket High School or Blanket School is a public high school located in Blanket, Texas (USA) and classified as a 1A school by the UIL. It is part of the Blanket Independent School District located in eastern Brown County. For the 2024-2025 school year, the school was given a "D" by the Texas Education Agency.

== Athletics ==
The Blanket Tigers compete in these sports -

- Basketball
- Cross Country
- 6-Man Football
- Golf
- Tennis
- Track

== See also ==
- List of high schools in Texas
