= Thunderbird Bay, Texas =

- Census-designated place
- Location within Texas
- Coordinates: 31°54′31″N 99°01′15″W
- Country: United States
- State: Texas
- County: Brown

Area
  - Total: 2.9 sq mi (7.6 km^{2})
  - Land: 2.5 sq mi (6.6 km^{2})
  - Water: 0.39 sq mi (1.0 km^{2})
- Elevation: 1,453 ft (443 m)

Population (2010)
  - Total: 663
  - Density: 261/sq mi (100.7/km^{2})
- Time zone: UTC-6 (Central (CST))
  - Summer (DST): UTC-5 (CDT)
- Area code: 325
- FIPS code: 48-72902
- GNIS feature ID: 2586996

Thunderbird Bay is a census-designated place (CDP) in Brown County in central Texas, United States. As of the 2020 census, Thunderbird Bay had a population of 764.

== Geography ==
Thunderbird Bay is located in north-central Brown County along the northern arm of Lake Brownwood, a reservoir on Pecan Bayou. By road, the CDP is 20 miles (32 km) north of Brownwood, the county seat.

According to the United States Census Bureau, the CDP has a total area of 2.9 square miles (7.6 km^{2}), of which 2.5 square miles (6.6 km^{2}) is land and 0.39 square miles (1.0 km^{2}), or 13.42%, is water.

== Demographics ==
Historical population
Census	Pop.	Note	%±
2010	663		—
2020	764		15.2%
U.S. Decennial Census; 1850–1900 1910; 1920 1930 1940; 1950 1960 1970; 1980 1990 2000; 2010 2020

Thunderbird Bay first appeared as a census designated place in the 2010 U.S. census.

Thunderbird Bay CDP, Texas – Racial and ethnic composition Note: the US Census treats Hispanic/Latino as an ethnic category. This table excludes Latinos from the racial categories and assigns them to a separate category. Hispanics/Latinos may be of any race.
Race / Ethnicity (NH = Non-Hispanic)	Pop 2010	Pop 2020	% 2010	% 2020
White alone (NH)	607	674	91.55%	88.22%
Black or African American alone (NH)	5	3	0.75%	0.39%
Native American or Alaska Native alone (NH)	4	3	0.60%	0.39%
Asian alone (NH)	3	1	0.45%	0.13%
Native Hawaiian or Pacific Islander alone (NH)	0	0	0.00%	0.00%
Other race alone (NH)	1	3	0.15%	0.39%
Mixed race or Multiracial (NH)	15	32	2.26%	4.19%
Hispanic or Latino (any race)	28	48	4.22%	6.28%
Total	663	764	100.00%	100.00%

As of the 2020 United States census, there were 764 people, 357 households, and 141 families residing in the CDP.
