= Lake Brownwood =

Lake in Texas, United States

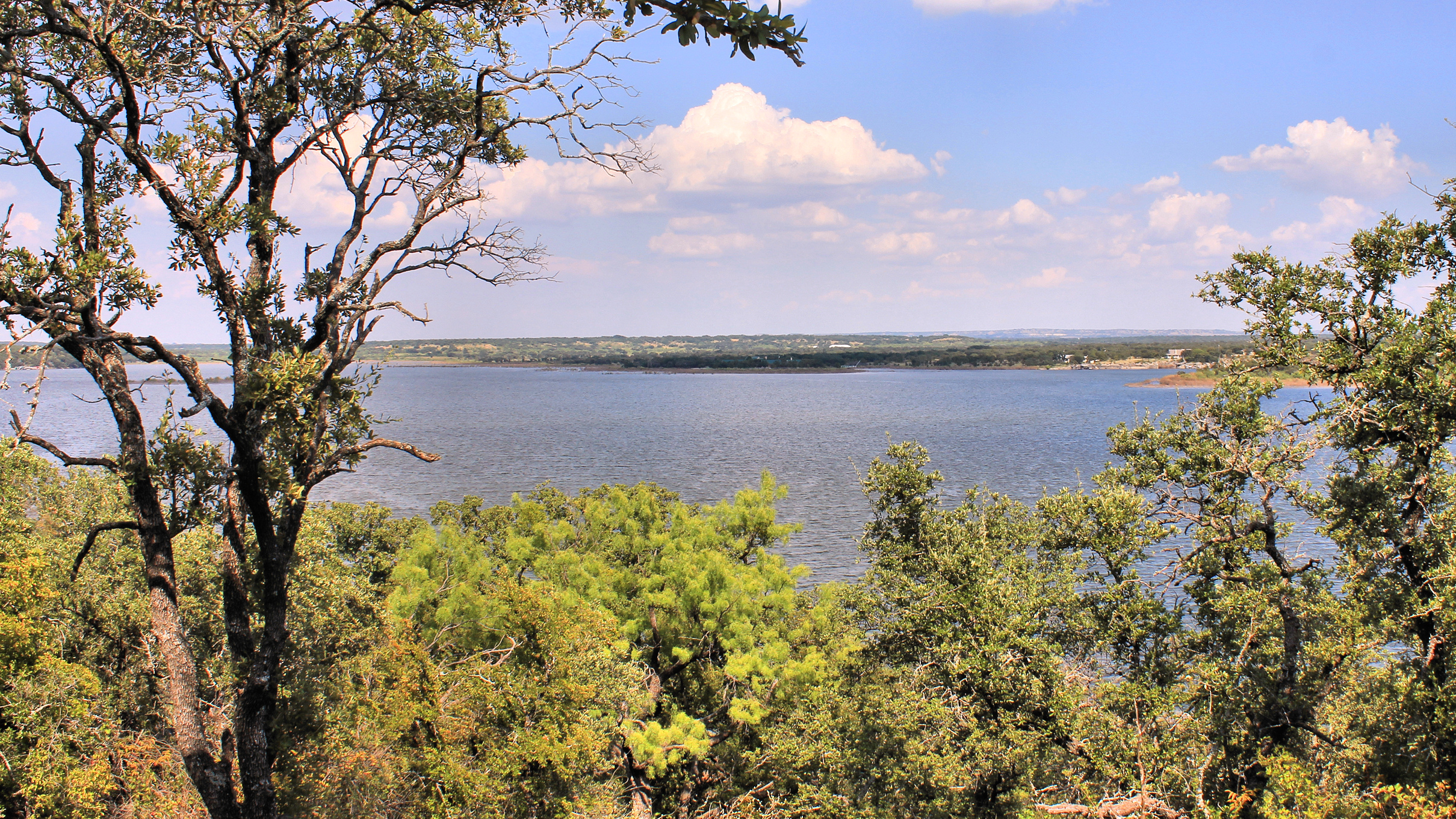
- Lake Brownwood viewed from Lake Brownwood State Park

- Location within Texas
- Location: Brown County, Texas
- Coordinates: 31°52′20″N 99°01′20″W
- Type: reservoir
- Basin countries: United States
- Surface area: 7,300 acres (30 km^{2})
- Surface elevation: 1,424 ft (434 m)

Lake Brownwood is a reservoir on Jim Ned Creek and Pecan Bayou in Brown County, Texas, United States. The reservoir is used for flood control, the municipal water supply, and recreation, and is controlled by the Brown County Water Improvement District. The reservoir is 6,814 acres (2,758 ha) at an elevation of 1,424.6 feet (434.2 m) and is considered eutrophic. Lake Brownwood contains two named islands, both located towards the northern half of the lake: Goat Island and McCartney Island.

== History ==
After a devastating flood in 1900, the citizens of Brown County created the Brown County Water Improvement District by election in 1926. The water district acquired the land necessary and built a dam to impound the waters of Pecan Bayou at its confluence with Jim Ned Creek. Dam construction started in 1930 and was completed in 1933. A large flood filled the reservoir in July 1932 but the water was released to complete construction of the dam. Deliberate impoundment of the reservoir began in July 1933. The town of Lake Brownwood, Texas formed, and the Texas Parks Board acquired land for Lake Brownwood State Park in 1933.
