= Grosvenor, Texas =

- Unincorporated community
- Location within Texas Location within the United States
- Coordinates: 31°52′57″N 99°09′00″W
- Country: United States
- State: Texas
- County: Brown
- Elevation: 1,519 ft (463 m)
- Time zone: UTC-6 (Central (CST))
  - Summer (DST): UTC-5 (CDT)
- Area code: 325
- GNIS feature ID: 1378390

Grosvenor is an unincorporated community in Brown County, Texas, United States. According to the Handbook of Texas, the community had no population estimates in 2000. It is located within the Brownwood, Texas micropolitan area.

== History ==
Grosvenor was named for Ohio U.S. Representative Charles H. Grosvenor. A post office was established at Grosvenor in 1900 and remained in operation until the mid-1970s. In 1914, the community had three stores and 50 inhabitants. It had between one and two businesses and 42 residents in 1940. The population further declined to 31 in 1980 and had no population recorded in 2000, despite being listed on county maps.

== Geography ==
Grosvenor is located on Farm to Market Road 1850, 16 mi (26 km) northwest of Brownwood in western Brown County.

== Education ==
In 1940, Grosvenor had its own elementary school. Today, the community is served by the Bangs Independent School District.
