= Zephyr High School =

Location
- 11625 CR 281; Zephyr, Texas 76432-0708; United States
- Coordinates: 31.675244°N 98.793763°W

Information
- School type: Public, high school
- School district: Zephyr Independent School District
- Principal: Caleb Walls
- Teaching staff: 21.59 (2022–23) (FTE)
- Grades: PK-12
- Enrollment: 227 (2022–23)
- Student to teacher ratio: 10.51 (2022–23)
- Colors: Maroon, Gray & White
- Athletics conference: UIL Class A
- Mascot: Bulldogs
- Yearbook: The Zephyr
- Website: zephyrisd.net

Zephyr High School is a public high school located in unincorporated Zephyr, Texas (U.S.) and classified as a 1A school by the UIL. It is part of the Zephyr Independent School District located in eastern Brown County. For the 2024-2025 school year, the school was given a "B" by the Texas Education Agency.

== Athletics ==
The Zephyr Bulldogs compete in these sports:

- Basketball
- Cross Country
- 6-Man Football
- Golf
- Track and Field
- Tennis
- Volleyball

Zephyr built a new football field complete with an artificial surface in 2009. This stadium is home to Tapps Division 1, 2, and 3 state championships.
