= Coffey Anderson =

American singer-songwriter

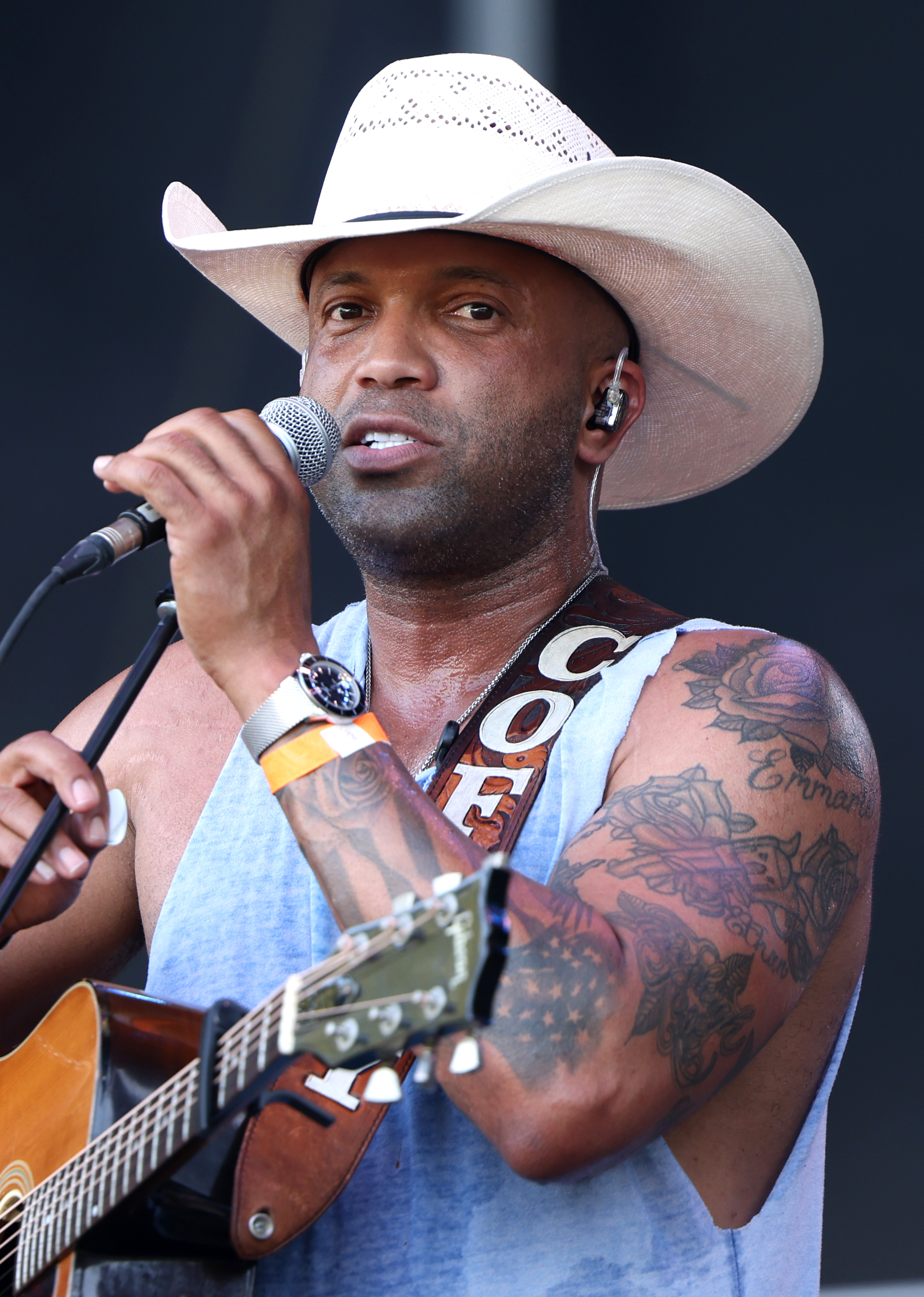
- Anderson performing in 2026

Background information
- Born: Cofféy Anderson; December 15, 1978 (age 47)
- Origin: Bangs, Texas, United States
- Genres: Country pop; gospel
- Occupations: Singer; songwriter; record producer; musician
- Instruments: Vocals; guitar
- Years active: 2002–present
- Website: Coffeyanderson.com

Coffey Anderson (born December 15, 1978) (sometimes using just his mononym Cofféy or Coffey) is an American country singer-songwriter, originally from Bangs, Texas. He came to fame through his YouTube videos releasing Christian versions of mainstream music. In 2008 he took part in Nashville Star.

His self-titled album Coffey Anderson released on September 28, 2010 on Coffey Entertainment / Dream Records / Universal entered the Billboard 200 at No. 134. Five of his eleven albums are general albums: Southern Man (2008), Me and You (2008), Coffey Anderson (2010), Boots & Jeans (2012), This Is Me (2016) and Country Style (2018). The rest are faith-based Christian albums: Inspiration Vol. 1 (2008), three released in the series Worship Unplugged, Volumes 1 and 2 in 2008, and Vol. 3 in 2011, Redemption (2013) and God Is Enough (2015). He also released Kids Songs EP (2015). And Anderson's newest release Country Style (2018). Anderson founded his own indie label Coffey Global LLC and tours extensively.

== Early life ==
Raised in Bangs, Texas, Coffey Anderson has a bachelor's degree in Ministry from Howard Payne University (HPU). He also played basketball as a second class All American for the HPU Yellow Jackets team in Brownwood, Texas for period 1999–2002. As a basketball player, he had already been chosen All-State, All-West Texas Super Team and All-Area teams for two seasons along with being named District MVP for his junior and senior seasons before joining the Yellow Jackets.

== Musical style ==
Predominantly a country artist, Anderson previously recorded as a gospel singer. His song "I Wanna Be Your Cowboy" features a country rock sound, while Anderson raps on the song "Hillbilly Gangster".

== Career ==
Anderson became known via his YouTube videos where he sings lively renditions of original and cover materials. singing pop, country and Christian songs. He is also known for his interactive stage performances. Some of his more popular YouTube videos include his compositions "Memphis", "Southern Man" "Rock and Roll Sally", "Can I?" and "Better Today". He has also been involved in Direct-to-Fan networks in the music community, launching his "Direct-to-Fan Live Sessions".

On April 30, 2010, Coffey signed a record deal with Los Angeles label Dream Records. His self-titled album Coffey Anderson released on September 28, 2010 is his first charting album on the US Billboard 200 albums chart. The first single from the album is "You Are All I'm After" with an accompanying music video. He has followed it up with two new singles, "Seek Your Face" and "Sunshine".

== In popular culture ==
Coffey was briefly a contestant on season 2 of American Idol in 2003, making it to the Hollywood round.

Coffey had a small walk on during the series run of Life Goes On.

Coffey’s song “Mr. Red White and Blue” is occasionally used in TikTok videos.

=== Nashville Star ===
In 2008, Anderson was one of the 12 finalists on Nashville Star in its sixth and last season, broadcast nationally on NBC with repeats on American and Canadian CMT networks and a companion radio show entitled Nashville Star Radio featuring the week's performances from the television show, as well as exclusive in-studio performances and interviews with the finalists and judges. Coffey Anderson placed 4th overall. In addition to cover renditions, Anderson sang from his own compositions including "Southern Man" from the CD of the same title, and "Rock'n'Roll Sally". He was eliminated in Week 8 (broadcast July 28, 2008) just before the finals. He finished 4th overall out of 12 finalist acts.

=== Country Ever After ===
On 6 November 2020, Netflix premiered Anderson's reality TV sitcom Country Ever After, costarring his wife Criscilla Crossland, their three children and his father, Stanley Anderson. The series was planned to be called Country-Ish but was changed to the present one on launch. The series' first season followed Anderson's independent country music career, Criscilla's battle with stage 3 colon cancer and return to professional dancing, and explored how they mix both with family and their shared faith. The series was produced by Touched by an Angel star Roma Downey.

== Appearances in other media ==
In February 2013, Taco Bell used a Spanish version of Lionel Richie's "Hello", sung by Anderson, in the restaurant chain's Cool Ranch Doritos Locos Tacos commercial.

In 2016, Anderson recorded an instructional video titled "Stop the Violence Safety Video for When You Get Pulled Over by the Police".

== Personal life ==
Anderson is biracial, with his father being white and his mother being black.

Anderson met hip-hop dancer Criscilla Crossland, who performed for music artists such as Britney Spears, Rihanna and Snoop Dogg and also once served as a choreographer for the Dallas Cowboys Cheerleaders, at a church in 2008 and they got married on February 14, 2009. The couple had three children; a son and two daughters. Anderson has another daughter from a previous marriage.

In 2018 Criscilla was diagnosed with stage 4 colon cancer. Despite winning her first bout with colon cancer by the summer of 2021, Criscilla confirmed to People in February 2022 that the cancer still nevertheless had a "very, very high" chance of returning. Coffey announced on his Instagram page that he and Criscilla Crossland were divorcing, with Criscilla later confirmed to have filed for divorce in 2022. Criscilla would at one point appear in the Netflix docuseries about the Dallas Cowboys cheerleading team and the summer of 2024 served as an audition judge for the cheerleaders of the 2024 season. Criscilla died from colon cancer on December 2, 2025, at the age of 45.

He is involved in charity, partnering with the Military Warriors Support Foundation based in San Antonio, Texas.

== Discography ==
=== Albums ===
Album details	Peak chart positions				Track listing
Album details	US	US Heat	US Christ	US Indie	Track listing
Southern Man: Release date: 2008; Label: self-released	—	—	—	—	No. / Title / Length; 1. / "Rock and Roll Sally" / 3:37; 2. / "Memphis" / 3:47; 3. / "You Gave Me You" / 3:52; 4. / "Can I" / 3:58; 5. / "Better Today" / 4:03; 6. / "Together Babe" / 3:17; 7. / "Recovery" / 3:14; 8. / "Blinded" / 4:09; 9. / "Big Legged Woman" / 2:17; 10. / "Southern Man" / 3:36
Me and You: Release date: 2008; Label: self-released	—	—	—	—	No. / Title / Length; 1. / "Go to Mexico" / 3:51; 2. / "Young Love" / 2:49; 3. / "Angel" / 3:17; 4. / "Let Me Love You" / 3:34; 5. / "Permission" / 3:25; 6. / "Heaven" / 2:55; 7. / "Let's Make Love" / 3:57; 8. / "Modern Day Hero" / 2:30; 9. / "All That and More" / 3:54; 10. / "I Fall into Your Arms" / 4:07
The Inspiration Vol. 1: Release date: 2008; Label: self-released	—	—	—	—	No. / Title / Length; 1. / "All Ye" / 4:10; 2. / "Never Turn Back" / 3:33; 3. / "Father I Need You" / 3:42; 4. / "Holy is The Lamb" / 4:09; 5. / "Call on the Name" / 4:38; 6. / "Wait on the Lord" / 3:34; 7. / "All I Need" / 3:49; 8. / "My Hearts Desire" / 3:15; 9. / "Glory Glory" / 2:21
Worship Unplugged Vol. 1: Release date: 2008; Label: self-released	—	—	—	—	No. / Title / Length; 1. / "Umbrella (Christ Mix)" / 2:33; 2. / "All Ye (Acoustic)" / 3:42; 3. / "Celebremos" / 2:56; 4. / "Blessed Be Your Name" / 3:25; 5. / "Lord, I Lift Your Name on High" / 3:32; 6. / "I Could Sing of Your Love Forever" / 3:25; 7. / "Come to Your Senses" / 2:14; 8. / "How Great Is Our God" / 3:34; 9. / "You Are My Strength" / 3:11; 10. / "Here I Am to Worship" / 3:37
Worship Unplugged Vol. 2: Release date: 2009; Label: self-released	—	—	—	—	No. / Title / Length; 1. / "I Will" / 2:52; 2. / "Open the Eyes of My Heart (acoustic)" / 3:20; 3. / "Trading My Sorrows (acoustic)" / 2:55; 4. / "Jesus, Lover of My Soul / No One" / 3:27; 5. / "Holiness (acoustic)" / 3:21; 6. / "My Hearts Desire (acoustic)" / 2:59; 7. / "Father I Adore You (acoustic)" / 2:01; 8. / "Sanctuary (acoustic)" / 2:04; 9. / "Call on the Name (acoustic)" / 4:52; 10. / "Holy Is the Lamb (acoustic)" / 4:12
Coffey Anderson: Release date: September 28, 2010; Label: Dream Records	134	4	11	21	No. / Title / Length; 1. / "Free" / 3:28; 2. / "All The Way to Texas" / 3:37; 3. / "Comes Down To It" / 3:28; 4. / "You Are All I'm After" / 3:14; 5. / "Better Today (Wedding Version)" / 4:03; 6. / "You Alone" / 3:18; 7. / "My Soul Magnifies" / 2:52; 8. / "Seek Your Face" / 4:07; 9. / "Rebuild Our Faith" / 3:40; 10. / "All Ye" / 3:23; 11. / "Father Abraham" / 3:10
Worship Unplugged Vol. 3: Release date: December 9, 2011; Label: self-released	—	—	—	—	No. / Title / Length; 1. / "Winning" / 3:08; 2. / "Can't Believe It (Christ Mix)" / 3:08; 3. / "Amazing Love" / 5:01; 4. / "Amazing Grace (Amazing Mercy)" / 3:15; 5. / "Lift Him Up" / 3:21; 6. / "Lollipop (Christ Mix)" / 2:33; 7. / "Better Today (Wedding Song) [Acoustic]" / 4:28; 8. / "You Are All I'm After (Acoustic)" / 3:36; 9. / "Pumped Up Kicks (Christ Mix)" / 3:50; 10. / "Deuces (Christ Mix) (feat. Young Chozen & Sada K.)" / 4:43
Boots & Jeans: Release date: September 3, 2012; Label: self-released	—	—	—	—	No. / Title / Length; 1. / "Cinderella" / 3:56; 2. / "Water to Beer" / 3:24; 3. / "All That and More" / 4:40; 4. / "15 Minutes" / 3:29; 5. / "Whiskey Night" / 3:47; 6. / "Rock and Roll Sally" / 3:40; 7. / "Mr. Red White and Blue" / 3:27; 8. / "Better Today (Wedding Song)" / 4:10; 9. / "Go to Mexico" / 3:24; 10. / "Chicken Wangin" / 3:35; 11. / "All the Way to Texas" / 3:40
Redemption: Release date: December 2, 2013; Label: self-released	—	—	—	—	No. / Title / Length; 1. / "Dirt Road Church" / 3:28; 2. / "2 Blessed 2 Be Stressed" / 3:14; 3. / "We Are Never Ever Getting Back Together (Christ Mix)" / 3:49; 4. / "Run This Town (Christ Mix)" / 3:45; 5. / "10000 Reasons" / 4:14; 6. / "How He Loves" / 3:10; 7. / "Starry Night" / 3:46; 8. / "On the Back of That Old Truck" / 2:50; 9. / "Come in from the Rain" / 3:00; 10. / "Mighty to Save" / 3:23
God Is Enough: Release date: October 9, 2015; Label: self-released	—	—	—	—	No. / Title / Length; 1. / "Counting Stars (Christ Mix)" / 3:00; 2. / "Jesus Saves" (feat. Manwell) / 3:43; 3. / "Oceans" / 3:15; 4. / "Holy Spirit" / 4:47; 5. / "Cornerstone" / 3:36; 6. / "Oh the Blood" / 2:46; 7. / "Our God" / 3:47; 8. / "Holy Spirit (Acoustic)" / 4:47; 9. / "Cornerstone (Acoustic)" / 3:34; 10. / "Our God (Acoustic)" / 3:47
This Is Me: Release date: January 15, 2016; Label: self-released	—	—	—	—	No. / Title / Length; 1. / "Magazine Girl" / 3:28; 2. / "I Wanna Be Your Cowboy" / 2:51; 3. / "Glad You're Mine" / 2:48; 4. / "Tacos and Margaritas" / 3:29; 5. / "Your New Boyfriend" / 3:40; 6. / "Lets Make Love" / 3:47; 7. / "Darling I Do" (engagement song) / 3:46; 8. / "Ready Aim Fire" / 3:01; 9. / "HillBilly Gangster" / 3:28; 10. / "Glad You're Mine" (remix feat. Southern Man) / 3:01
Cowboy Style: Release date: March 16, 2018; Label: self-released	—	—	—	—	No. / Title / Length; 1. / "Bud Light Blue" / 2:49; 2. / "Cowboy Style" / 2:55; 3. / "Ride Out" / 3:33; 4. / "Every Now and Then" / 3:20; 5. / "Memorial Day" / 3:33; 6. / "Back of That Old Truck" / 2:58; 7. / "Spring Broke" / 2:33; 8. / "She's Famous" / 3:07; 9. / "Cerveza" / 2:41; 10. / "Lean on In" / 2:51

=== EPs ===
EP details
Kids Songs EP
- Release date: October 15, 2015
- Label: self-released
Track listing

No.	Title	Length
1.	"Alphabet Song"	1:27
2.	"Bingo"	1:38
3.	"Wheels On the Bus"	1:47
4.	"This Old Man"	1:30
5.	"I Say Hola, You Say Hi"	1:43
6.	"Pee in the Potty"	1:50

== Videography ==
- 2010: "You Are All I'm After / Free"
- 2013: "2 Blessed 2 Be Stressed"
- 2013: "Mighty to Save"
- 2013: "15 Minutes"
- 2014: "Better Today"
- 2014: "Hillbilly Gangster"
- 2014: "All the Way to Texas"
- 2014: "Mr Red White and Blue"
- 2015: "Magazine Girl"
- 2016: "Tacos and Margaritas"
- 2016: "I Wanna Be Your Cowboy"
- 2017: "Bud Light Blue"
- 2017: "Can I"
- 2017: "Stay with Me"
- 2018: "Ride Out"
- 2019: "Memory Lane"
- 2020: "She's Famous"
