= Cross Cut, Texas =

- Unincorporated community
- Location within Texas Location within the United States
- Coordinates: 32°02′02″N 99°07′57″W
- Country: United States
- State: Texas
- County: Brown
- Elevation: 1,585 ft (483 m)
- Time zone: UTC-6 (Central (CST))
  - Summer (DST): UTC-5 (CDT)
- Area code: 325
- GNIS feature ID: 1333713

Cross Cut is an unincorporated community in Brown County, Texas, United States. According to the Handbook of Texas, the community had no population estimates in 2000. It is located within the Brownwood, Texas micropolitan area.

== History ==
Its population dropped to 22 in 2010.

== Geography ==
Cross Cut is located at the intersection of Farm to Market Roads 279 and 2940, which is 24 mi (39 km) northwest of Brownwood, 50 mi (80 km) southeast of Abilene, and 7 mi (11 km) south of Cross Plains in northwestern Brown County.

== Education ==
In 1947, Cross Cut had a school that joined the Cross Plains Independent School District (Cross Plains ISD). The building continued to stand until it was demolished in 1999. The community continues to be served by Cross Plains ISD today.

== Notable person ==
- Robert E. Howard, pulp fiction author who created Conan the Barbarian.
