= Zephyr Independent School District =

School district in Texas, United States

Address
- 11625 Cr 281 Zephyr, Texas, 76890; United States
- Coordinates: 31°40′36″N 98°47′38″W

District information
- Type: Public independent school district
- Grades: Pre-K–12
- Superintendent: Stanton Marwitz
- Schools: 1
- Budget: US$2.4 million (2018–19)

Students and staff
- Enrollment: 212 (2021–22)
- Teachers: 20.48 (FTE) (2021–22)
- Staff: 15.08 (FTE) (2021–22)
- Student–teacher ratio: 10.35 (2021–22)

Other information
- Website: zephyrisd.net

Zephyr Independent School District is a public independent school district based in the community of Zephyr, Texas (U.S.). Located in Brown County, the district extends into a small portion of Mills County and a very small portion of Comanche County.

== Academic achievement ==
In 2009, the school district was rated "recognized" by the Texas Education Agency.

== Schools ==
Zephyr ISD has two campuses:

- Zephyr High School (Grades 7-12)
- Zephyr Elementary School (Grades K-6)

== Special programs ==
=== Athletics ===
Zephyr High School plays six-man football.

== Controversy ==
In July 2024, the ACLU of Texas sent Zephyr ISD a letter, alleging that the district's 2023-2024 dress and grooming code appeared to violate the Texas CROWN Act, a state law which prohibits racial discrimination based on hair texture or styles, and asking the district to revise its policies for the 2024-2025 school year.

== See also ==
- List of school districts in Texas
