= Zephyr, Texas =

- Unincorporated community Census-designated place
- Location within Texas Location within the United States
- Coordinates: 31°40′45″N 98°47′28″W
- Country: United States
- State: Texas
- County: Brown

Area
  - Total: 1.51 sq mi (3.92 km^{2})
- Elevation: 1,513 ft (461 m)
- Time zone: UTC-6 (Central (CST))
  - Summer (DST): UTC-5 (CDT)
- Area code: 325
- GNIS feature ID: 2805742

Zephyr is an unincorporated community and census-designated place (CDP) in Brown County, Texas, United States. As of the 2020 census, Zephyr had a population of 179.

== Geography ==
Zephyr lies along U.S. Highway 84 in southeastern Brown County, about 12 miles east of Brownwood, 42 miles east of Coleman, and 54 miles southwest of Stephenville.

== History ==
The community was initially on the banks of Blanket Creek in 1850. The name "Zephyr", meaning a soft, gentle wind, was first used by land surveyors trapped in the area during a blue norther. In 1863, the Lazarus Vann family arrived in the vicinity. They were joined by other families over the next few years. Zephyr's first store opened in 1878 and a post office was established the next year. In 1885, the Gulf, Colorado and Santa Fe Railway completed a line from Brownwood to Lampasas that missed Zephyr by roughly a mile. Store owner J. M. Wilson moved his store and the post office one mile west of Zephyr's initial location to its present site. The community later became a stop on the railroad. On May 30, 1909, an F4 tornado struck Zephyr, killing 34 people and injuring 70. Most of the deaths occurred in residential areas on Zephyr's southern and eastern sides. To date, the Zephyr tornado remains one of the deadliest in Texas history. Zephyr rebuilt and had a long period of growth. By 1940, the population stood around 750. Zephyr's economy depended on cotton, but a boll weevil infestation and deteriorating market conditions caused the community's last gin to close in the early 1940s. The population had fallen below 300 during the 1960s and remained at that level into the 1970s. During the final decades of the 20th century, Zephyr was home to around 198 people and had two businesses. That figure remained constant through 2000. In 1989, Zephyr had First Baptist, Methodist, and Churches of Christ and was a farming and ranching community.

Zephyr has a post office with the zip code 76890.

== Demographics ==
Historical population
Census	Pop.	Note	%±
2020	179		—
U.S. Decennial Census; 1850–1900 1910; 1920 1930 1940; 1950 1960 1970; 1980 1990 2000; 2010 2020

Zephyr first appeared as a census-designated place in the 2020 U.S. census.

=== 2020 census ===
Zephyr CDP, Texas – Racial and ethnic composition Note: the US Census treats Hispanic/Latino as an ethnic category. This table excludes Latinos from the racial categories and assigns them to a separate category. Hispanics/Latinos may be of any race.
Race / Ethnicity (NH = Non-Hispanic)	Pop 2020	% 2020
White alone (NH)	162	90.50%
Black or African American alone (NH)	0	0.00%
Native American or Alaska Native alone (NH)	1	0.56%
Asian alone (NH)	0	0.00%
Native Hawaiian or Pacific Islander alone (NH)	0	0.00%
Other race alone (NH)	0	0.00%
Mixed race or Multiracial (NH)	2	1.12%
Hispanic or Latino (any race)	14	7.82%
Total	179	100.00%

== Education ==
Zephyr's first school was founded in 1876. A new school building was built in 1940 and remained in operation until the end of the 1980s.

Public education in Zephyr is provided by the Zephyr Independent School District. The district has one campus that includes Zephyr Elementary School (grades PreK–5), Zephyr Junior High (grades 6–8), and Zephyr High School (grades 9–12). The district was voted to be independent so that the few students who live there would not have to be bussed to another school.

In 2009, Mandi Moore enlisted the help of Joyce Baker, who attended the same church and was a school board member, to build Cross Classical Academy.
