= Bangs Independent School District =

School district in Texas

Location
- Bangs, Texas ESC Region 15 USA
- Coordinates: 31°43′02″N 99°07′53″W

District information
- Type: Independent school district
- Grades: Pre-K through 12
- Superintendent: Josh Martin
- Schools: 4 (2009-10)
- NCES District ID: 4809390

Students and staff
- Students: 1,076 (2010-11)
- Teachers: 83.83 (2009-10) (on full-time equivalent (FTE) basis)
- Student–teacher ratio: 13.10 (2009-10)
- Athletic conference: UIL Class 2A Football Division I
- District mascot: Dragons
- Colors: Green, White

Other information
- TEA District Accountability Rating for 2011: Academically Acceptable
- Website: Bangs ISD

Bangs Independent School District is a public school district based in Bangs, Texas (USA). The district is located in western Brown County and extends into a small portion of Coleman County.

== Finances ==
As of the 2010–2011 school year, the appraised valuation of property in the district was $274,804,000. The maintenance tax rate was $0.104 and the bond tax rate was $0.017 per $100 of appraised valuation.

== Academic achievement ==
In 2011, the school district was rated "academically acceptable" by the Texas Education Agency.

== Schools ==
As of the 2011–2012 school year, the district had four schools.

=== Regular instructional ===
- Bangs High School (Grades 9-12)
- Bangs Middle School (Grades 5-8)
- J.B. Stevens Elementary (Grades PK-4)

=== Alternative instruction ===
- Early Special Program (Grades PK-12)

== See also ==
- List of school districts in Texas
