= Cross Classical Academy =

Christian school in Texas, United States

Coordinates: 31.717430°N 98.983100°W

Cross Classical Academy is a private, Christian, university-model school in Brownwood, Texas. It is Brownwood's only university-model school—a fast-growing alternative education model and example of the resurgent classical education movement—and one of only 21 in Texas and 51 in the United States. Following a small pilot program during the 2010-2011 school year, Cross Classical opened in fall 2011 on the campus of Union Presbyterian Church in downtown Brownwood. The school currently offers grade levels Pre-K through 8th grade and has an enrollment of 47 students for the 2016-17 school year. Its mascot is the Eagles, which is drawn from Isaiah 40:31 in the Bible.

== History ==
Cross Classical Academy was conceived in spring 2009 by Mandi Moore, a local mother exploring educational options for her kindergarten-age daughter. Moore felt she wanted a higher level of parental involvement than public school or a traditional five-day-a-week private school offered, but didn't feel her daughter would be well served by homeschooling alone. She enlisted the help of Joyce Baker, a fellow church member and former school board member in nearby Zephyr, Texas. Over the next year the duo worked on the school's launch. Initially, they assumed Cross Classical would not open until the 2011-2012 school year, but after another parent, Stephanie Davis, an attorney from Comanche, Texas expressed immediate interest in the program, Moore and Baker realized that a small pilot program would be viable for 2010-2011.

Mandi Moore currently serves as Chairman of CCA's Board of Directors and Stephanie L. Davis serves as the school's Administrator.

== Educational model and mission ==
Cross Classical Academy adheres to a typical University-Model® school weekly schedule, with classes held two days a week—in Cross Classical's case, Monday and Wednesday—and students being homeschooled the other three days. The model is designed to allow parents a more active role in educating their children in an attempt to integrate the home and school environments.

The mission of the school is "to partner with parents to provide for their children a classical education founded upon a Biblical worldview in a University-Model® setting." Ministry is the most significant driving force behind Cross Classical's future.

== Student base ==
Cross Classical Academy's current enrollment base draws from over seven towns throughout central and west-central Texas and over 15 community churches. Though the Brownwood, Texas micropolitan statistical area, as defined by the US Census, only has a population of about 38,000, Moore has stated that Cross Classical draws from a population base of 100,000, including students who commute from greater distances.
