= Debs Garms =

American baseball player (1907–1984)

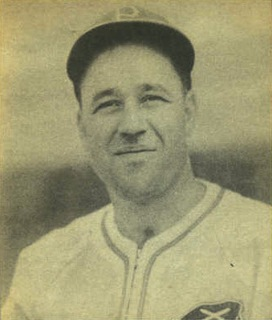
- Garms with the Pittsburgh Pirates in 1940
- Outfielder / Third baseman
- Born: June 26, 1907; Bangs, Texas, U.S.
- Died: December 16, 1984 (aged 77); Glen Rose, Texas, U.S.
- Batted: Left Threw: Right

MLB debut
- August 10, 1932, for the St. Louis Browns

Last MLB appearance
- September 25, 1945, for the St. Louis Cardinals

MLB statistics
- Batting average: .293
- Home runs: 17
- Runs batted in: 328
- Stats at Baseball Reference

Teams
- St. Louis Browns (1932–1935); Boston Braves (1937–1939); Pittsburgh Pirates (1940–1941); St. Louis Cardinals (1943–1945)

Career highlights and awards
- World Series champion (1944); NL batting champion (1940)

Debs C. Garms (June 26, 1907 – December 16, 1984) was an American professional baseball player for 12 seasons as an outfielder and third baseman for the St. Louis Browns, Boston Braves, Pittsburgh Pirates, and St. Louis Cardinals. Garms broke up Johnny Vander Meer's streak of hitless innings in 1938. He won the National League batting title in 1940, hitting .355 for the Pirates despite having played in only 103 games and garnering 358 at bats. Garms' batting title proved very controversial because of his limited playing time. In 1941, he set a then-major league record for consecutive pinch hits with seven, which stood until Dave Philley broke it in 1958.

== Early life ==
Born in Bangs, Texas, Garms was the eighth of 10 children, and was named after Eugene Debs. Garms' older sister married Slim Harriss, a pitcher for the Philadelphia Athletics and Boston Red Sox in the 1920s. Garms attended Howard Payne University, joining the track and baseball teams. One of Garms' games was attended by minor league manager Carl Williams, and soon after, Garms was signed to a minor league contract with the St. Louis Browns. After playing in the minor leagues for multiple years, Garms batted .344 in 1932 and was called up to the major league Browns.

== Career ==
In 1936, Garms was drafted by the Boston Bees from the Browns in the rule 5 draft despite initially targeting Whit Wyatt. In 1938, Bees' manager Casey Stengel platooned Garms with Joe Stripp. After three seasons with the Bees, Garms was purchased by the Pittsburgh Pirates. In 1940, his first year with the Pirates, Garms won the National League batting title despite serving as a platoon player, recording only 358 at-bats in 103 games. Despite the fact that many complained at the low batting averages in 1940 compared to past years, most assumed that 400 at-bats were needed to be eligible for a batting title. In September 1940, league president Ford Frick stated, "The batting title is simply unofficial and never has been subject for league legislation." Frick's spokesman said, "he thought 100 games would be a sufficient prerequisite for the championship."

After the season, the league's decision to make Garms the champion remained controversial, particularly for Chicago Cubs fans, who believed that Stan Hack was the rightful winner. In December 1941, Garms was purchased by the St. Louis Cardinals, with whom Garms played the last three seasons of his career after playing the 1942 season in the minor leagues.

In 12 seasons and 1,010 games, Garms hit .293 (910 for 3111) with 438 runs scored, 141 doubles, 39 triples, 17 home runs, 328 RBI, 288 walks, .355 on-base percentage, and a .379 slugging percentage. He appeared in the 1943 World Series and 1944 World Series, and was hitless in seven at-bats. Garms made the last out of the 1943 World Series when he grounded out to New York Yankees second baseman Joe Gordon in Game 5.

== After baseball ==
After Garms retired, he purchased a ranch in Glen Rose, Texas. Garms lived at the ranch until the 1950s, when the severe Texas drought forced him to sell the ranch and move into town in 1959, where he worked as foreman for a lime quarry operation, and eventually served on the school board for Glen Rose Independent School District. Garms was diagnosed with Alzheimer's disease in the 1980s, and died at Glen Rose Hospital on December 16, 1984. On November 12, 2004, Garms was inducted into the Texas Baseball Hall of Fame alongside Kenny Rogers, Rube Foster, Craig Biggio, Jeff Bagwell, Bill Brown and Jim Gilligan at the J.W. Marriott Hotel in Houston. No one represented Garms at the ceremony, with officials failing to find a relative to accept the plaque on his behalf. After the ceremony, officials found his son, David, living in Richardson, Texas and the Hall of Fame officials would make a trip to his house on December 15 to present the plaque.

== See also ==
- List of Major League Baseball batting champions
