= Blanket, Texas =

- Town
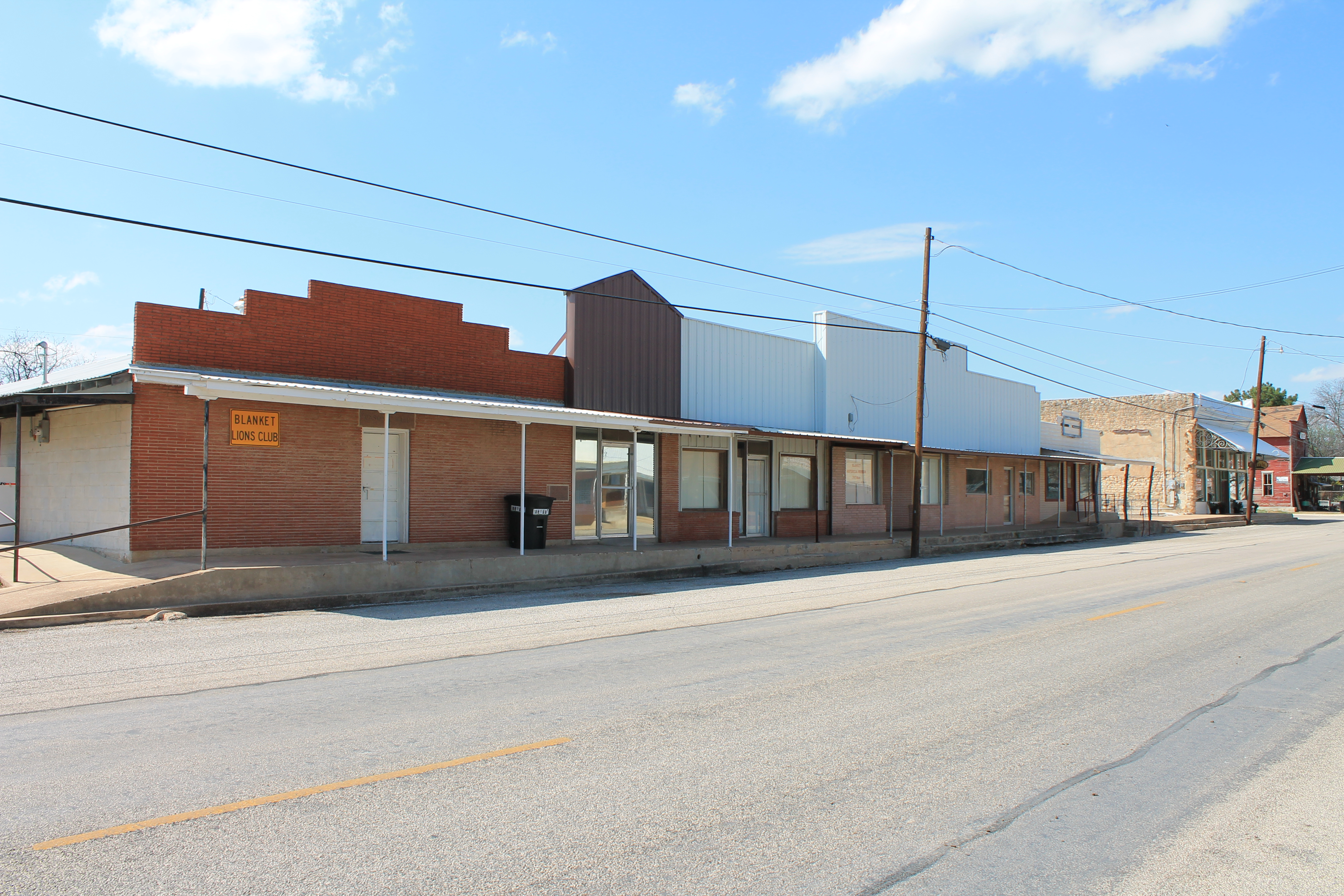
- Interactive map of Blanket, Texas
- Coordinates: 31°49′28″N 98°47′23″W
- Country: United States
- State: Texas
- County: Brown

Area
  - Total: 0.64 sq mi (1.67 km^{2})
  - Land: 0.64 sq mi (1.67 km^{2})
  - Water: 0 sq mi (0.00 km^{2})
- Elevation: 1,614 ft (492 m)

Population (2020)
  - Total: 369
  - Density: 572/sq mi (221/km^{2})
- Time zone: UTC-6 (Central (CST))
  - Summer (DST): UTC-5 (CDT)
- ZIP code: 76432
- Area code: 325
- FIPS code: 48-08596
- GNIS feature ID: 2411697

Blanket is a town located in Brown County in west-central Texas, United States. The population was 369 at the 2020 census.

The town takes its name from nearby Blanket Creek.

== Geography ==
Blanket is located in eastern Brown County. U.S. Routes 67 and 377 pass along the southeastern edge of the town, leading southwest 14 miles (23 km) to Brownwood, the county seat, and northeast 12 miles (19 km) to Comanche.

According to the United States Census Bureau, the town has a total area of 0.62 square miles (1.6 km^{2}), all land.

=== Climate ===
The climate in this area is characterized by hot, humid summers and generally mild to cool winters. According to the Köppen climate classification, Blanket has a humid subtropical climate, Cfa on climate maps.

== Demographics ==
Historical population
Census	Pop.	Note	%±
1920	472		—
1930	318		−32.6%
1940	327		2.8%
1950	361		10.4%
1960	320		−11.4%
1970	346		8.1%
1980	388		12.1%
1990	381		−1.8%
2000	402		5.5%
2010	390		−3.0%
2020	369		−5.4%
U.S. Decennial Census; 2020 Census

As of the census of 2000, 402 people, 170 households, and 113 families resided in the town. The population density was 699.5 inhabitants per square mile (270.1/km^{2}). The 189 housing units averaged 328.9 per square mile (128.0/km^{2}). The racial makeup of the town was 92.54% White, 1.00% African American, 1.00% Native American, 3.73% from other races, and 1.74% from two or more races. Hispanics or Latinos of any race were 9.20% of the population.

Of the 170 households, 31.2% had children under the age of 18 living with them, 54.1% were married couples living together, 10.0% had a female householder with no husband present, and 33.5% were not families. About 31.2% of all households were made up of individuals, and 14.1% had someone living alone who was 65 years of age or older. The average household size was 2.36 and the average family size was 2.97.

In the town, the population was distributed as 28.4% under the age of 18, 4.7% from 18 to 24, 26.6% from 25 to 44, 25.9% from 45 to 64, and 14.4% who were 65 years of age or older. The median age was 39 years. For every 100 females, there were 103.0 males. For every 100 females age 18 and over, there were 92.0 males.

The median income for a household in the town was $34,375, and for a family was $42,222. Males had a median income of $34,063 versus $16,667 for females. The per capita income for the town was $16,611. About 15.4% of families and 17.8% of the population were below the poverty line, including 21.9% of those under age 18 and 31.7% of those age 65 or over.

== Education ==
Blanket is served by the Blanket Independent School District.

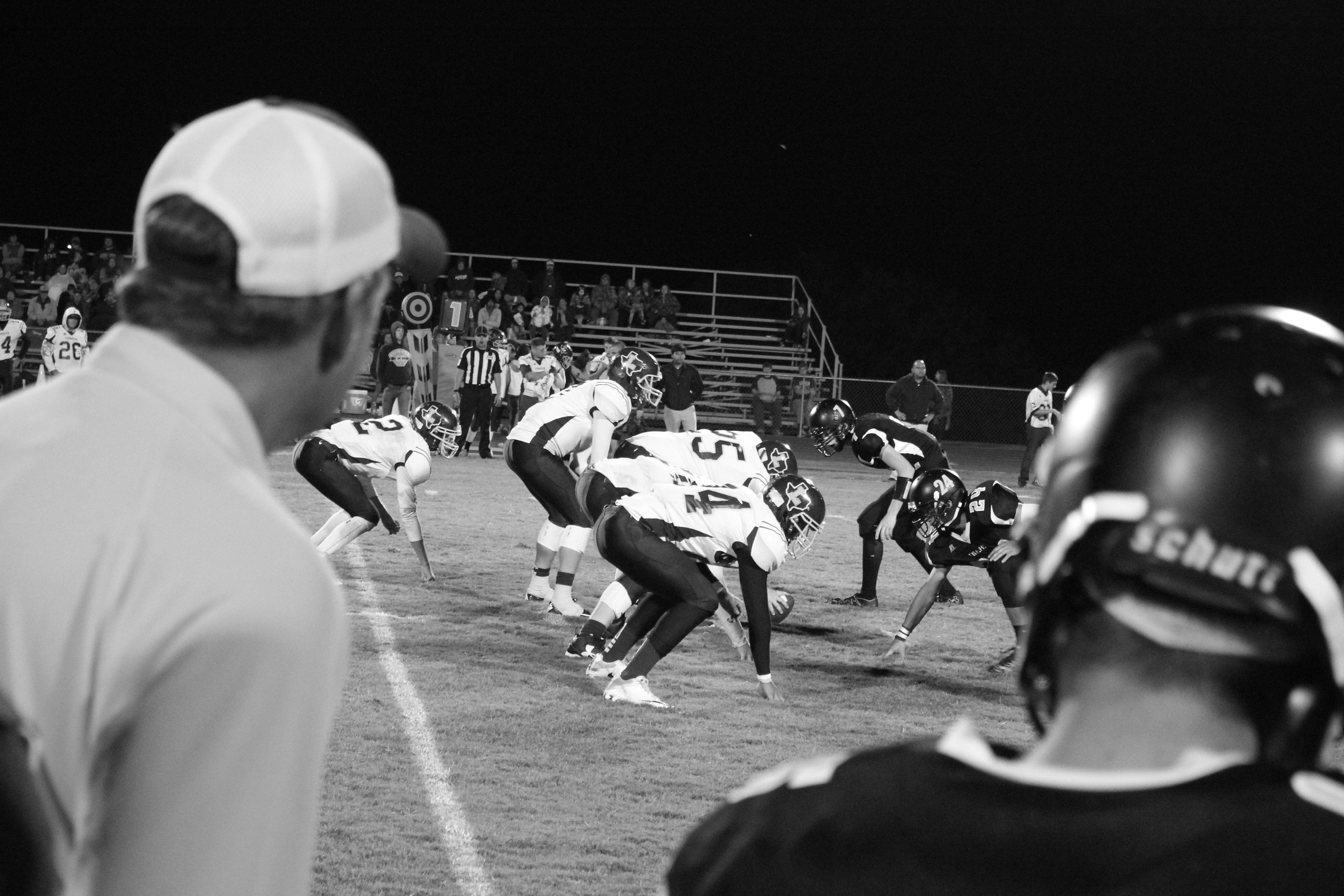
A six-man football game being played in Blanket in October 2016.

== Six-man football ==
Six-man football is played in Blanket by Blanket High School and Blanket Junior High School. Six-man football is a variation of American football played with six players on a team, rather than 11. Blanket High's six-man football team broke the 100 points in a game mark when in 2014 they defeated Loraine High 101–99 during a Class 1A Division 2 bidistrict playoff game. Also over the years, Blanket High School has won numerous awards from Six-man Heaven Arts Contest in areas of film, poetry, web design, photography, and music, all focused on six-man football. Six-man football follows rules and organization laid out by the UIL, governing body of high school sports in Texas.

== Photo gallery ==
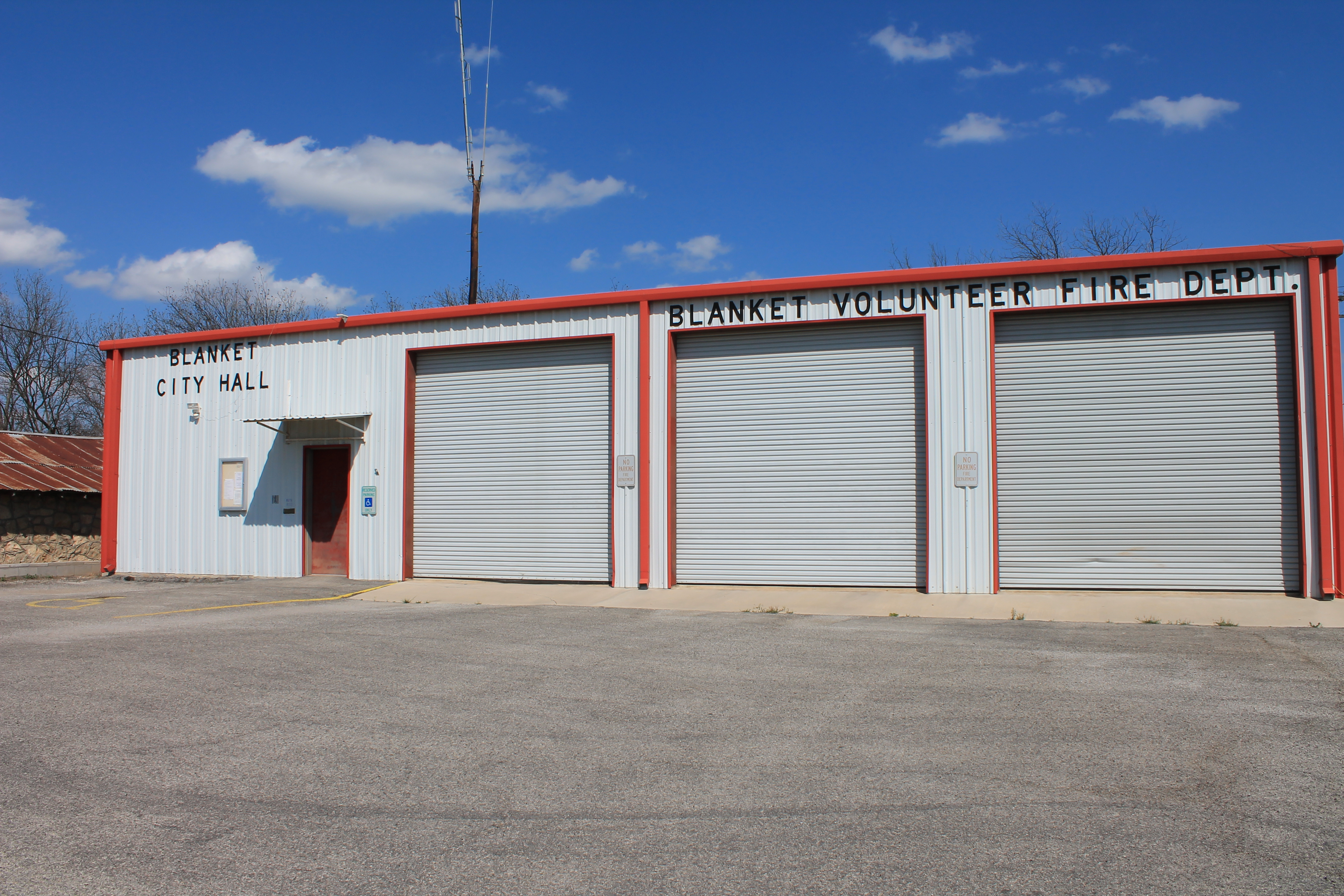
Blanket, Texas City Hall

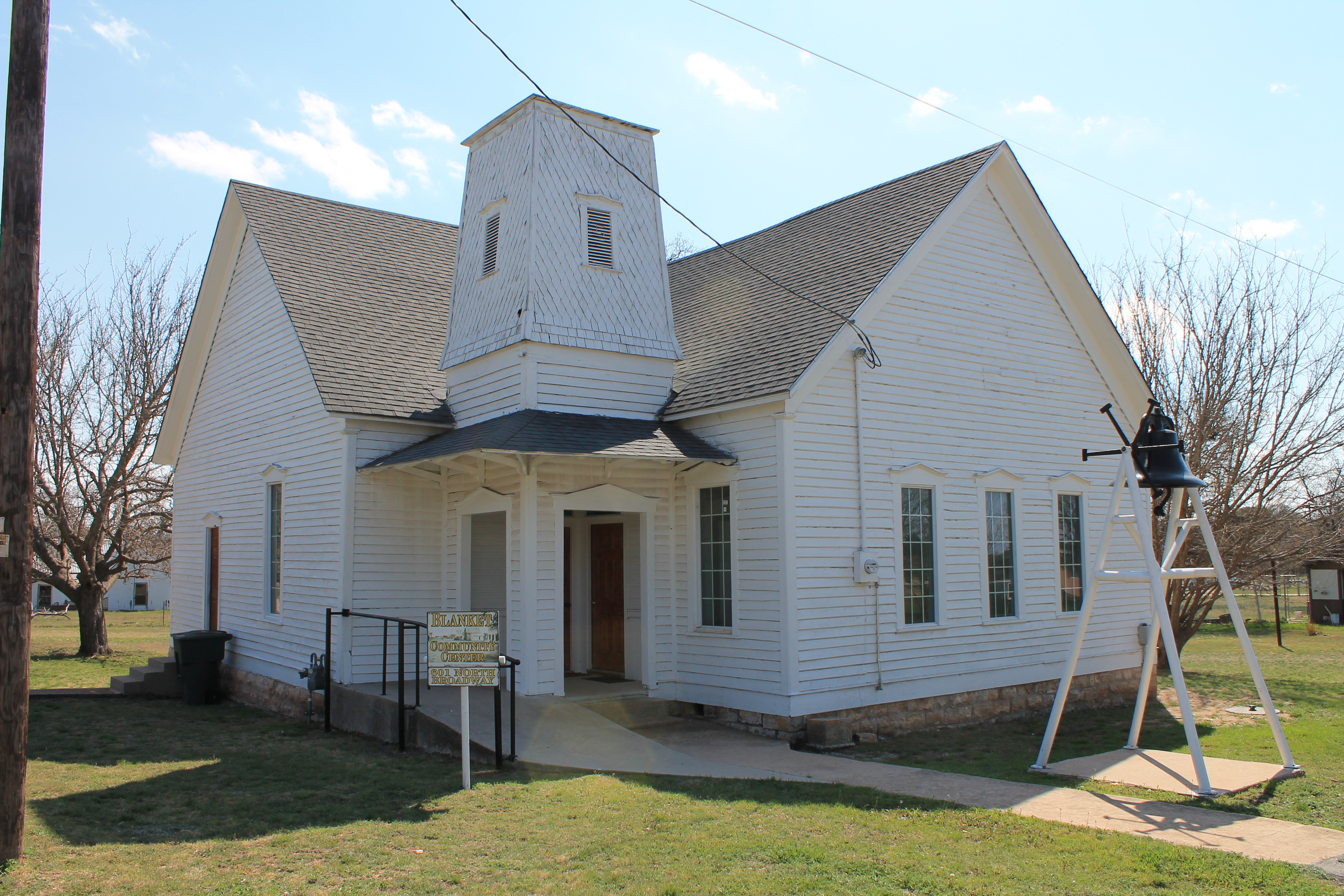
Blanket, Texas Community Center
