= Blanket Independent School District =

Public school district in Texas, United States

Coordinates: 31°49′17″N 98°47′33″W

Location
- Blanket, Texas ESC Region 15 USA

District information
- Type: Independent school district
- Grades: Pre-K through 12
- Superintendent: David Whisenhunt
- Schools: 5 (2009-10)
- NCES District ID: 4810380

Students and staff
- Students: 210 (2010-11)
- Teachers: 21.62 (2009-10) (on full-time equivalent (FTE) basis)
- Student–teacher ratio: 10.50 (2009-10)
- Athletic conference: UIL Class 1A 6-man Football Division II
- District mascot: Tigers
- Colors: Black, Gold

Other information
- TEA District Accountability Rating for 2011-12: Academically Acceptable
- Website: Blanket ISD

Blanket Independent School District is a public school district based in Blanket, Texas (USA) located in Brown County. A portion of the district extends into Comanche County.

== Finances ==
As of the 2010-2011 school year, the appraised valuation of property in the district was $37,947,000. The maintenance tax rate was $0.104 and the bond tax rate was $0.007 per $100 of appraised valuation.

== Academic achievement ==
In 2011, the school district was rated "academically acceptable" by the Texas Education Agency. Forty-nine percent of districts in Texas in 2011 received the same rating. No state accountability ratings will be given to districts in 2012. A school district in Texas can receive one of four possible rankings from the Texas Education Agency: Exemplary (the highest possible ranking), Recognized, Academically Acceptable, and Academically Unacceptable (the lowest possible ranking).

Historical district TEA accountability ratings

- 2011: Academically Acceptable
- 2010: Recognized
- 2009: Recognized
- 2008: Academically Acceptable
- 2007: Academically Acceptable
- 2006: Academically Acceptable
- 2005: Academically Acceptable
- 2004: Academically Acceptable

== Schools ==
In the 2011-2012 school year Blanket ISD operated three schools.

- Blanket School (Grades PK-12)
- Early Special Program (Grades PK-8)
- Early Special Program (Grades 9-12)

Up until 2010, the district operated Blanket Elementary School (Grades PK-8).

== Special programs ==
=== Athletics ===
Blanket High School participates in the boys sports of tennis, basketball, golf, track, cross country, and football. The school participates in the girls sports of basketball, tennis, golf, tennis, track, and cross country. For the 2012 through 2014 school years, Blanket High School will play six-man football in UIL Class 1A 6-man Football Division II. Junior High boys participate in football, track, cross country, tennis, and basketball. Junior High girls participate in cheer, track, cross country, tennis, and basketball.

== See also ==
- List of school districts in Texas
- List of high schools in Texas
