= Blanket mortgage =

A blanket mortgage, or blanket loan, is a type of mortgage used to fund the purchase of more than one piece of real property. Blanket loans are popular with builders and developers who buy large tracts of land, then subdivide them to create many individual parcels to be gradually sold one at a time. Rather than securing a new mortgage each time a portion of the development is sold, the borrower uses the blanket loan to buy them all. Once a parcel is sold, a portion of the mortgage is released, with the rest of the mortgage remaining intact.

In the United States, traditional mortgages typically have a "due-on-sale clause", which stipulates that if property secured by the mortgage is sold, the entire outstanding mortgage debt must be paid in full immediately. With a blanket mortgage, a “release clause” allows the sale of portions of the secured property and corresponding partial repayment of the loan. This is done to facilitate purchases and sales of multiple units of property with the convenience of a single mortgage.

A builder, for example, might use a blanket mortgage to pay for construction of several homes in one neighborhood. When a home is sold, the portion of the mortgage that was used to fund that home is paid back to the lender, and then retired. The remaining outstanding balance is adjusted accordingly, and the blanket mortgage continues phase by phase in that manner, until all houses are sold and the entire mortgage is repaid and retired.
