= Horse blanket (disambiguation) =

A horse blanket, also known as a horse rug (UK), is a type of coat or blanket that covers almost the entire body of a horse. The term may also refer to:

- "Horse blanket", a slang term for the very large pre-1929 US dollar bill
- Saddle blanket, the type of blanket used to protect a horse's back from a saddle
