= May Independent School District =

School district in Texas

Coordinates: 31.9794°N 98.9229°W

Address
- 3400 Cr 411 E May, Texas, 76857; United States

District information
- Grades: PK–12
- Schools: 2
- NCES District ID: 4829520
- District ID: TX-025905

Students and staff
- Students: 266 (2023–24)
- Teachers: 24.79 (FTE)
- Student–teacher ratio: 10.3

Other information
- Website: www.mayisd.com

May Independent School District is a public school district based in the community of May, Texas, United States. Located in northeast Brown County, a small portion of the district extends into Comanche County.

May ISD has two campuses:

- May High School (Grades 7–12)
- May Elementary School (Grades PK-6)

== Academic achievement ==
In 2009, the school district was rated "recognized" by the Texas Education Agency.

== Athletics ==
May High School plays six-man football.

== See also ==
- List of school districts in Texas
