= May, Texas =

- Unincorporated community
- Location within Texas Location within the United States
- Coordinates: 31°58′47″N 98°55′12″W
- Country: United States
- State: Texas
- County: Brown

Area
  - Total: 1.49 sq mi (3.85 km^{2})
- Elevation: 1,667 ft (508 m)
- Time zone: UTC-6 (Central (CST))
  - Summer (DST): UTC-5 (CDT)
- ZIP Code: 76857
- Area code: 325
- GNIS feature ID: 1341103

May is an unincorporated community in Brown County, Texas, United States. As of the 2020 census, May had a population of 277. May was designated a Recorded Texas Historic Landmark in 1981, with marker number 5377. In 2001, historical marker 12532 was added for May United Methodist Church, commemorating the church's presence in the community for over 100 years. The May Cemetery was designated a Historic Texas Cemetery in 2016.

== Geography ==
May is situated at the intersection of U.S. Highway 183 and FM 1689 in northeastern Brown County, approximately 20 miles (32 km) north of Brownwood, 28 miles (45 km) south of Cisco, and 36 miles (58 km) south of Eastland.

=== Climate ===
The climate in this area is characterized by hot, humid summers and generally mild to cool winters. According to the Köppen climate classification system, May has a humid subtropical climate, Cfa on climate maps.

== History ==
The area was originally part of a Mexican land grant given to empresario John Cameron in 1827. The community itself was developed in the 1870s and was named for pioneer settler W.D. May. May's brother, Nathan, opened a store at the site in 1879. A post office was established two years later. In 1907, May had a blacksmith shop, general store, newspaper, and bank.

That same year, the community became a stop on the Brownwood North and South Railway. The line was abandoned in 1927. The population had grown to roughly 500 by 1940 and had several churches and 14 businesses. During the following years, May began to slowly decline. The community was home to around 285 residents by 1980. That figure remained steady through 2000. Although May is unincorporated, it has a post office, with the ZIP code of 76857.

May experienced slow growth in population, since the landscape was sandy. The community also had Baptist and Methodist churches.

== Demographics ==
Historical population
Census	Pop.	Note	%±
2020	277		—
U.S. Decennial Census; 1850–1900 1910; 1920 1930 1940; 1950 1960 1970; 1980 1990 2000; 2010 2020

May first appeared as a census designated place in the 2020 U.S. census.

=== 2020 census ===
May CDP, Texas – Racial and ethnic composition Note: the US Census treats Hispanic/Latino as an ethnic category. This table excludes Latinos from the racial categories and assigns them to a separate category. Hispanics/Latinos may be of any race.
Race / Ethnicity (NH = Non-Hispanic)	Pop 2020	% 2020
White alone (NH)	224	80.87%
Black or African American alone (NH)	2	0.72%
Native American or Alaska Native alone (NH)	0	0.00%
Asian alone (NH)	0	0.00%
Native Hawaiian or Pacific Islander alone (NH)	0	0.00%
Other race alone (NH)	1	0.36%
Mixed race or Multiracial (NH)	12	4.33%
Hispanic or Latino (any race)	38	13.72%
Total	277	100.00%

== Education ==
The May Independent School District provides public education in the community of May. Before then, May had a school called Old Swayback school.

== Notable person ==
- J.W. Harris, bull rider, moved to May at age 15 and graduated from May High School.
