= Brookesmith, Texas =

- Unincorporated community
- Location within Texas Location within the United States
- Coordinates: 31°33′02″N 99°07′07″W
- Country: United States
- State: Texas
- County: Brown
- Elevation: 1,348 ft (411 m)
- Time zone: UTC-6 (Central (CST))
  - Summer (DST): UTC-5 (CDT)
- ZIP Code: 76827
- Area code: 325
- GNIS feature ID: 1352935

Brookesmith is an unincorporated community in Brown County, Texas, United States. According to the Handbook of Texas, the community had a population of 61 in 2000. It is located within the Brownwood, Texas micropolitan area.

== History ==
Brookesmith takes its name from a local banker, Brooke Smith. It had a post office from 1903 through at least the 1980s, and a population of 61 in the years 1980, 1990, and 2000. It also has a cemetery, Smith Cemetery.

== Geography ==
Brookesmith is located two miles off U.S. Highway 377 and Farm to Market Road 586, 19 mi (31 km) south of Brownwood and 39 mi (63 km) west of Goldthwaite between Clear Creek and Spring Branch in southwestern Brown County.

=== Climate ===
The climate in this area is characterized by hot, humid summers and generally mild to cool winters. According to the Köppen Climate Classification system, Brookesmith has a humid subtropical climate, abbreviated "Cfa" on climate maps.

== Education ==
In the 1980s, Brookesmith had a school that hosted 12 grade levels. The Brookesmith Independent School District serves area students.
