= Brookesmith Independent School District =

School district in Texas

Coordinates: 31.5483°N 99.11883°W

Brookesmith Independent School District is a public school district based in the community of Brookesmith, Texas (USA). Located in Brown County, a small portion of the district extends into Mills County.

== Academic achievement ==
In 2009, the school district was rated "academically acceptable" by the Texas Education Agency.

== Schools ==
Brookesmith ISD has two campuses -

- Brookesmith High School (Grades 9-12)
- Brookesmith Elementary School (Grades PK-8)

== Special programs ==
=== Athletics ===
Brooksmith High School plays six-man football.

== See also ==
- List of school districts in Texas
- List of high schools in Texas
