= Blanket Creek =

Stream in Texas, U.S.

Coordinates: 31.5223°N 98.7456°W

Blanket Creek is a stream in the U.S. state of Texas. It is a tributary to Pecan Bayou.

According to tradition, Blanket Creek was named from an incident when a group of Tonkawa Indians sat under blankets to stay dry during a rainstorm.
