= Bangs, Texas =

City in Texas, United States

- City
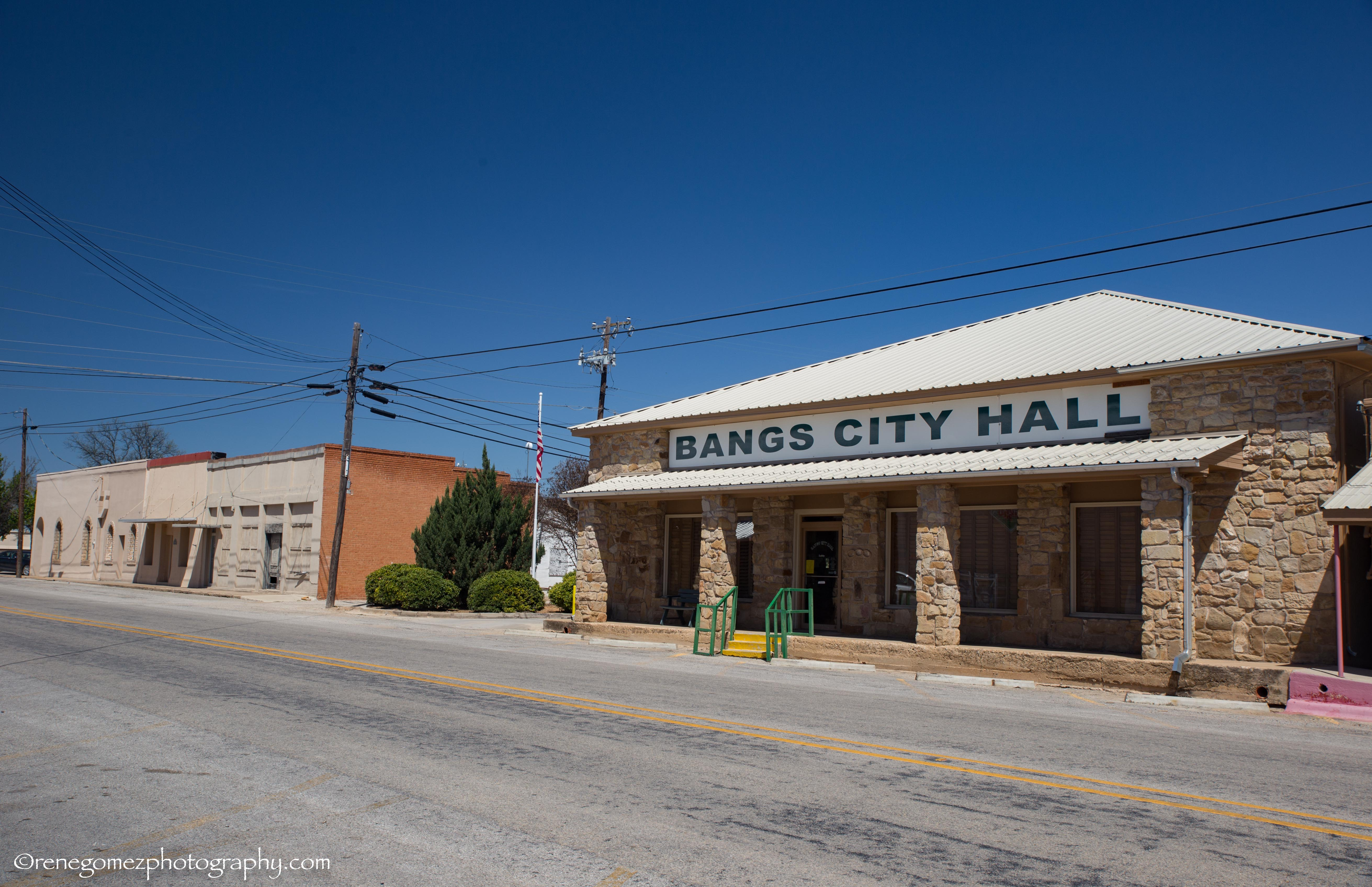
- Interactive map of Bangs, Texas
- Location within Texas Location within the United States Location within North America
- Coordinates: 31°42′58″N 99°7′49″W
- Country: United States
- State: Texas
- County: Brown

Area
  - Total: 1.50 sq mi (3.88 km^{2})
  - Land: 1.50 sq mi (3.88 km^{2})
  - Water: 0 sq mi (0.00 km^{2})
- Elevation: 1,608 ft (490 m)

Population (2020)
  - Total: 1,540
  - Density: 1,030/sq mi (397/km^{2})
- Time zone: UTC-6 (Central (CST))
  - Summer (DST): UTC-5 (CDT)
- ZIP code: 76823
- Area code: 325
- FIPS code: 48-05552
- GNIS feature ID: 2409783
- Website: cityofbangs.org

Bangs is a city located in Brown County in west-central Texas, United States. The population was 1,540 in the 2020 census.

== Geography ==
U.S. Routes 67 and 84 run concurrently through the city, leading east 9 miles (14 km) to Brownwood, the county seat, and west 11 miles (18 km) to Santa Anna in Coleman County.

According to the United States Census Bureau, the city has a total area of 1.5 square miles (3.8 km^{2}), all land.

== Demographics ==
Historical population
Census	Pop.	Note	%±
1910	512		—
1920	709		38.5%
1930	717		1.1%
1940	756		5.4%
1950	935		23.7%
1960	967		3.4%
1970	1,214		25.5%
1980	1,716		41.4%
1990	1,555		−9.4%
2000	1,620		4.2%
2010	1,603		−1.0%
2020	1,540		−3.9%
U.S. Decennial Census

=== 2020 census ===
As of the 2020 census, there were 1,540 people and 365 families residing in the city.

The median age was 41.9 years. 25.1% of residents were under the age of 18 and 19.7% were 65 years of age or older. For every 100 females there were 94.7 males, and for every 100 females age 18 and over there were 87.5 males age 18 and over.

0% of residents lived in urban areas, while 100.0% lived in rural areas.

There were 610 households in Bangs, of which 35.9% had children under the age of 18 living in them. Of all households, 46.2% were married-couple households, 16.7% were households with a male householder and no spouse or partner present, and 32.8% were households with a female householder and no spouse or partner present. About 28.7% of all households were made up of individuals and 12.9% had someone living alone who was 65 years of age or older.

There were 712 housing units, of which 14.3% were vacant. Among occupied housing units, 69.0% were owner-occupied and 31.0% were renter-occupied. The homeowner vacancy rate was 3.0% and the rental vacancy rate was 9.1%.

Racial composition as of the 2020 census
Race	Percent
White	78.1%
Black or African American	3.6%
American Indian and Alaska Native	1.0%
Asian	0.3%
Native Hawaiian and Other Pacific Islander	0%
Some other race	5.8%
Two or more races	11.2%
Hispanic or Latino (of any race)	19.4%

=== 2000 census ===
As of the census of 2000, 1,620 people, 633 households, and 419 families resided in the city. The population density was 1,171.9 inhabitants per square mile (452.5/km^{2}). There were 733 housing units at an average density of 530.3 units per square mile (204.7 units/km^{2}). The racial makeup of the city was 86.91% White, 4.75% African American, 0.37% Native American, 6.42% from other races, and 1.54% from two or more races. Hispanics or Latinos of any race were 12.72% of the population.

Of the 633 households, 33.2% had children under the age of 18 living with them, 51.5% were married couples living together, 12.6% had a female householder with no husband present, and 33.8% were not families. About 32.5% of all households were made up of individuals, and 18.5% had someone living alone who was 65 years of age or older. The average household size was 2.44 and the average family size was 3.10.

In the city, the population was distributed as 26.9% under the age of 18, 6.2% from 18 to 24, 24.6% from 25 to 44, 21.9% from 45 to 64, and 20.4% who were 65 years of age or older. The median age was 39 years. For every 100 females, there were 81.0 males. For every 100 females age 18 and over, there were 73.5 males.

The median income for a household in the city was $23,690, and for a family was $30,208. Males had a median income of $27,212 versus $19,141 for females. The per capita income for the city was $14,216. About 17.4% of families and 20.0% of the population were below the poverty line, including 21.1% of those under age 18 and 27.8% of those age 65 or over.

== History ==
Bangs was named after Samuel Bangs, who was given the land due to his services as a printer in the Texas Revolution, but he reportedly never saw the land. In 1886, tracks were laid from Brownwood to San Angelo with a depot in Bangs. The same year, a man opened a general store and applied to have a post office established there, with the application approved on May 24, 1886. In 1892, the first school was built with a population of 50 and eight established businesses. Bangs incorporated in 1915 with 600 residents and 21 businesses. The following year, a water system was installed followed by natural gas lines. Bangs Independent School District was formed in 1927, which eventually consolidated nine other school districts. In 1937, US Highway 67 was built through the town, and after World War II saw the development of new housing.

In 1948, when the population of Bangs was 756, the arrival of senatorial candidate Lyndon Johnson by helicopter was greeted by a crowd estimated to number 700 by accompanying reporters.

== In popular culture ==
Bangs is the birthplace of Major League Baseball batting champion Debs Garms.

The station is featured in one of Coffey Anderson's music videos titled "15 Minutes" Anderson, a country and Christian music singer, songwriter was born in Bangs, Texas.
