= Pecan Bayou (Colorado River tributary) =

Coordinates: 31.4273°N 98.7246°W

Location
- Country: United States
- State: Texas

Physical characteristics
- Mouth

The Pecan Bayou, said to be the westernmost "bayou" in the United States, is a slow-moving Texas stream that originates in northwestern Callahan and eastern Taylor Counties and flows southeast through Coleman and Brown Counties, before ending in northern Mills County where it joins the Colorado River approximately 8 miles west of Goldthwaite, Texas. The stream is fed by over twenty creeks and is one of five major tributaries of the Texas Colorado River. Between 1930 and 1933 a dam was constructed on the Pecan Bayou seven miles north of Brownwood forming Lake Brownwood. Below Lake Brownwood, the stream flows through Brownwood and Early, Texas.

== See also ==
- List of rivers of Texas
