= Brown County, Texas =

County in Texas, United States

- County
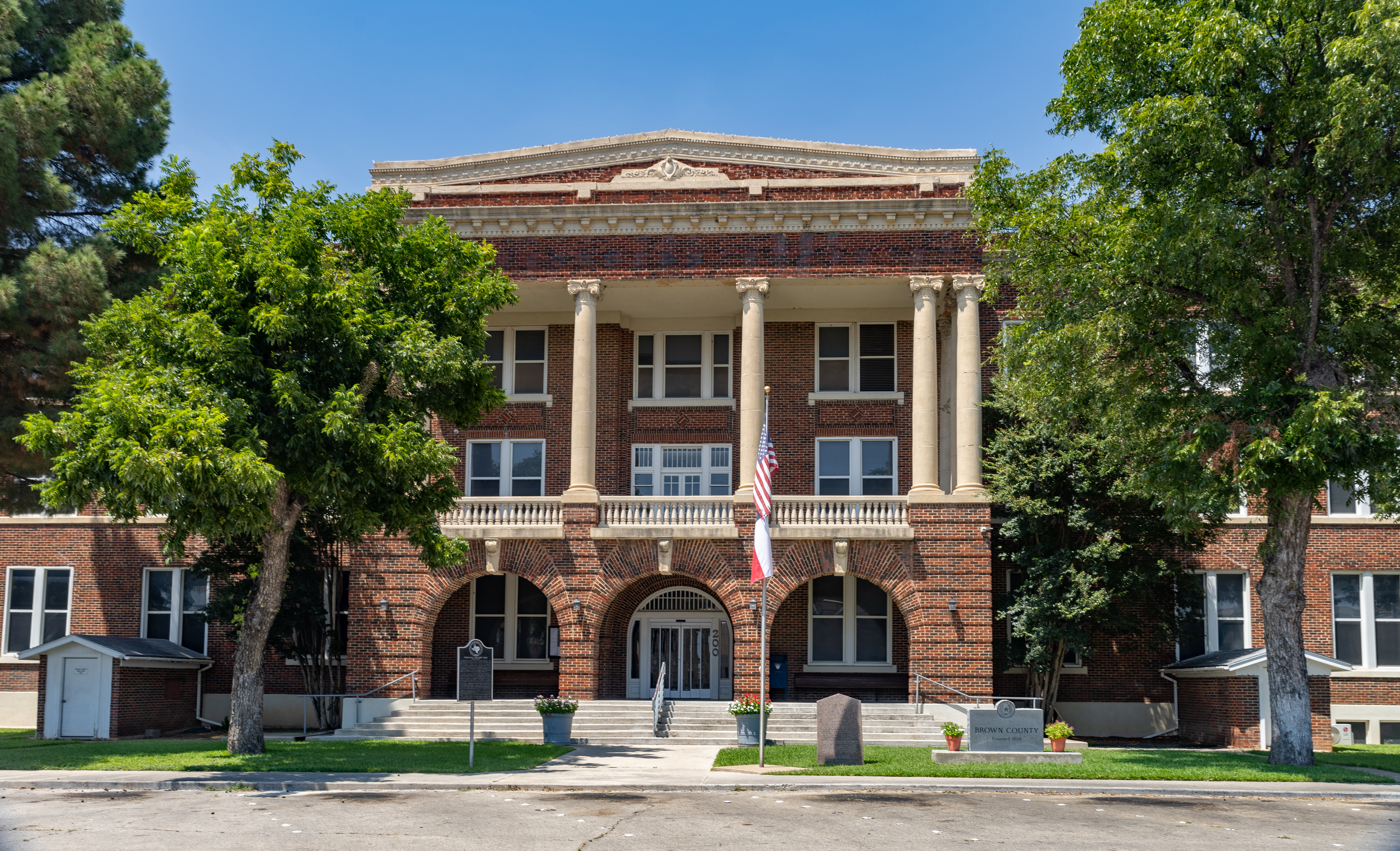
- The Brown County Courthouse in Brownwood

- Location within the U.S. state of Texas
- Coordinates: 31°46′N 99°00′W
- Country: United States
- State: Texas
- Founded: 1858
- Named for: Henry Stevenson Brown
- Seat: Brownwood
- Largest city: Brownwood

Area
  - Total: 957 sq mi (2,480 km^{2})
  - Land: 944 sq mi (2,440 km^{2})
  - Water: 13 sq mi (34 km^{2}) 1.3%

Population (2020)
  - Total: 38,095
  - Estimate (2025): 38,711 ▲
  - Density: 40/sq mi (15/km^{2})
- Time zone: UTC−6 (Central)
  - Summer (DST): UTC−5 (CDT)
- Congressional district: 11th
- Website: Official website

Brown County is a county in central Texas. As of the 2020 census, the population was 38,095. Its county seat is Brownwood. The county was founded in 1856 and organized in 1858. It is named for Henry Stevenson Brown, a commander at the Battle of Velasco, an early conflict between Texans and Mexicans. The Brownwood, TX Micropolitan Statistical Area includes all of Brown County.

== History ==
Native Americans lived here for thousands of years before Europeans entered the area. The historic inhabitants were the Penteka (also known to the Europeans as Comanche), who occupied this area at the time of European colonization. In 1721, the Marqués de San Miguel de Aguayo expedition is said to have passed through the county.

In 1838, land surveys were made of the area. In 1856, Welcome W. Chandler from Mississippi became the first settler, arriving with his family, John H. Fowler, and seven slaves. They built a log cabin on Pecan Bayou. The county was formed from Comanche and Travis Counties. It is named after Henry Stevenson Brown, an American pioneer from Kentucky. In 1858, the county was formally organized. Brownwood was designated as the county seat.

In 1874, John Wesley Hardin and gang celebrated his 21st birthday in Brown and Comanche Counties. Deputy Charles Webb drew his gun, provoking a gunfight that ended Webb's life. A lynch mob was formed, but Hardin and his family were put into protective custody. The mob broke into the jail and hanged his brother Joe and two cousins. Hardin fled. The Fort Worth-Brownwood stage was robbed five times in two months of 1875. Oil was discovered on the H. M. Barnes farm near Grosvenor in 1879. Texas Rangers killed two fence cutters in 1886, in the ongoing battle between farmers and ranchers over fencing open range. By the next year, cotton had become the county's most important crop. Pulitzer-Prize winner Katherine Ann Porter was born in 1890 at Indian Creek. The Fort Worth and Rio Grande Railway was built to the county in 1892. The Gulf, Colorado and Santa Fe Railway was built into Brownwood in 1895. In 1903, the GC&SF extended the line to Menard.

Also in 1903, the county voted itself a dry county. Alcohol did not become legal again until the 1950s.

In 1909, the boll weevil moved into the county, destroying the cotton economy. The first commercial production of oil came from the efforts of Jack Pippen at Brownwood in 1917. The first large field began producing from a depth of 1,100 feet (340 m) in 1919 near Cross Cut. In 1926, an oil boom followed the success of the White well on Jim Ned Creek; some 600 wells were drilled in several fields in the county during this time. By 1991, more than 50,561,000 barrels (8,038,600 m^{3}) of oil had been taken from Brown County lands since 1917.

In 1940, work began on Camp Bowie. The first German prisoners of war arrived in 1943; many had been members of Erwin Rommel's Afrika Korps.

In 1889, Howard Payne College and Daniel Baker College were established in Brownwood. They combined under the name Howard Payne College in 1953.

== Geography ==
According to the U.S. Census Bureau, the county has a total area of 957 sq mi (2,480 km^{2}), of which 13 sq mi (34 km^{2}) (1.3%) are covered by water.

=== Major highways ===
- U.S. Highway 67
- U.S. Highway 84
- U.S. Highway 183
- U.S. Highway 377
- State Highway 206
- State Highway 279
- Farm to Market Road 45

=== Adjacent counties ===
- Eastland County (north)
- Comanche County (northeast)
- Mills County (southeast)
- San Saba County (south)
- McCulloch County (southwest)
- Coleman County (west)
- Callahan County (northwest)

== Demographics ==
Historical population
Census	Pop.	Note	%±
1860	244		—
1870	544		123.0%
1880	8,414		1,446.7%
1890	11,421		35.7%
1900	16,019		40.3%
1910	22,935		43.2%
1920	21,682		−5.5%
1930	26,382		21.7%
1940	25,924		−1.7%
1950	28,607		10.3%
1960	24,728		−13.6%
1970	25,877		4.6%
1980	33,057		27.7%
1990	34,371		4.0%
2000	37,674		9.6%
2010	38,106		1.1%
2020	38,095		0.0%
2025 (est.)	38,711	▲	1.6%
U.S. Decennial Census; 1850–2010 2010 2020

=== Racial and ethnic composition ===
Brown County, Texas – Racial and ethnic composition Note: the US Census treats Hispanic/Latino as an ethnic category. This table excludes Latinos from the racial categories and assigns them to a separate category. Hispanics/Latinos may be of any race.
Race / Ethnicity (NH = Non-Hispanic)	Pop 1980	Pop 1990	Pop 2000	Pop 2010	Pop 2020	% 1980	% 1990	% 2000	% 2010	% 2020
White alone (NH)	28,718	28,814	29,772	28,478	26,672	86.87%	83.83%	79.03%	74.73%	70.01%
Black or African American alone (NH)	1,555	1,530	1,473	1,303	1,353	4.70%	4.45%	3.91%	3.42%	3.55%
Native American or Alaska Native alone (NH)	60	115	141	170	134	0.18%	0.33%	0.37%	0.45%	0.35%
Asian alone (NH)	70	85	129	160	269	0.21%	0.25%	0.34%	0.42%	0.71%
Native Hawaiian or Pacific Islander alone (NH)	x	x	2	14	27	x	x	0.01%	0.04%	0.07%
Other race alone (NH)	46	28	13	36	96	0.14%	0.08%	0.03%	0.09%	0.25%
Mixed race or Multiracial (NH)	x	x	351	492	1,333	x	x	0.93%	1.29%	3.50%
Hispanic or Latino (any race)	2,608	3,799	5,793	7,453	8,211	7.89%	11.05%	15.38%	19.56%	21.55%
Total	33,057	34,371	37,674	38,106	38,095	100.00%	100.00%	100.00%	100.00%	100.00%

=== 2020 census ===
As of the 2020 census, the county had a population of 38,095. The median age was 42.6 years. 21.6% of residents were under the age of 18 and 21.5% of residents were 65 years of age or older. For every 100 females there were 99.1 males, and for every 100 females age 18 and over there were 97.0 males age 18 and over.

The racial makeup of the county was 77.0% White, 3.8% Black or African American, 0.6% American Indian and Alaska Native, 0.7% Asian, 0.1% Native Hawaiian and Pacific Islander, 7.4% from some other race, and 10.4% from two or more races. Hispanic or Latino residents of any race comprised 21.6% of the population.

56.6% of residents lived in urban areas, while 43.4% lived in rural areas.

There were 15,074 households in the county, of which 28.2% had children under the age of 18 living in them. Of all households, 48.3% were married-couple households, 19.5% were households with a male householder and no spouse or partner present, and 26.8% were households with a female householder and no spouse or partner present. About 29.1% of all households were made up of individuals and 13.4% had someone living alone who was 65 years of age or older.

There were 18,897 housing units, of which 20.2% were vacant. Among occupied housing units, 68.7% were owner-occupied and 31.3% were renter-occupied. The homeowner vacancy rate was 2.5% and the rental vacancy rate was 11.5%.

=== 2000 census ===
As of the 2000 census, 37,674 people, 14,306 households, and 10,014 families resided in the county. The population density was 40 people per square mile (15 people/km^{2}). The 17,889 housing units averaged 19 units per square mile (7.3/km^{2}). The racial makeup of the county was 87.35% White, 4.01% Black or African American, 0.53% Native American, 0.37% Asian, 6.08% from other races, and 1.66% from two or more races. About 15.38% of the population was Hispanic or Latino of any race.

Of the 14,306 households in the county, 31.40% had children under the age of 18 living with them, 55.90% were married couples living together, 10.90% had a female householder with no husband present, and 30.00% were not families. About 26.50% of all households were made up of individuals, and 12.40% had someone living alone who was 65 years of age or older. The average household size was 2.48 and the average family size was 2.98.

In the county, the population was distributed as 25.80% under the age of 18, 10.10% from 18 to 24, 24.70% from 25 to 44, 22.90% from 45 to 64, and 16.40% who were 65 years of age or older. The median age was 37 years. For every 100, there were 97.40 males. For every 100 females age 18 and over, there were 93.10 males.

The median income for a household in the county was $30,974, and for a family was $37,725. Males had a median income of $30,169 versus $19,647 for females. The per capita income for the county was $15,624. About 14.00% of families and 17.20% of the population were below the poverty line, including 22.70% of those under age 18 and 12.10% of those age 65 or over.

== Media ==
The Brownwood Bulletin is the local daily newspaper, an American Consolidated Media company that also serves media online through its website. Brown County is part of the Abilene/Sweetwater/Brownwood television media market. Area television stations include KRBC-TV, KTXS-TV, KXVA, KTAB-TV, and KIDU-LD.

== Communities ==
=== Cities ===
- Bangs
- Brownwood (county seat)
- Early

=== Town ===
- Blanket

=== Census-designated places ===
- Lake Brownwood
- May
- Thunderbird Bay
- Zephyr

=== Unincorporated communities ===
- Brookesmith
- Cross Cut
- Grosvenor
- Indian Creek
- Owens
- Winchell

=== Ghost towns ===
- Byrds
- Dulin
- Fry
- Thrifty

== Politics ==
Brown County is a strongly Republican county. The last time it voted Democratic was Jimmy Carter in 1976.

United States presidential election results for Brown County, Texas
Year	Republican		Democratic		Third party(ies)	
Year	No.	%	No.	%	No.	%
1912	115	6.81%	1,433	84.84%	141	8.35%
1916	181	7.95%	1,986	87.22%	110	4.83%
1920	397	16.30%	1,708	70.11%	331	13.59%
1924	396	9.99%	3,467	87.48%	100	2.52%
1928	2,033	50.46%	1,992	49.44%	4	0.10%
1932	330	7.54%	4,024	91.98%	21	0.48%
1936	448	10.05%	3,971	89.08%	39	0.87%
1940	663	12.76%	4,523	87.06%	9	0.17%
1944	430	12.13%	2,426	68.45%	688	19.41%
1948	1,071	16.53%	5,059	78.06%	351	5.42%
1952	4,635	55.02%	3,778	44.85%	11	0.13%
1956	3,664	53.26%	3,195	46.44%	21	0.31%
1960	3,512	48.26%	3,720	51.11%	46	0.63%
1964	2,070	28.38%	5,214	71.49%	9	0.12%
1968	2,997	34.84%	3,999	46.49%	1,606	18.67%
1972	5,990	72.76%	2,171	26.37%	72	0.87%
1976	4,483	44.41%	5,577	55.25%	35	0.35%
1980	6,515	56.41%	4,867	42.14%	167	1.45%
1984	8,468	67.29%	4,070	32.34%	47	0.37%
1988	6,810	58.68%	4,763	41.04%	33	0.28%
1992	5,313	42.07%	4,264	33.76%	3,053	24.17%
1996	6,524	55.35%	4,138	35.11%	1,125	9.54%
2000	9,609	74.37%	3,138	24.29%	173	1.34%
2004	11,640	81.67%	2,523	17.70%	90	0.63%
2008	12,052	79.95%	2,822	18.72%	200	1.33%
2012	11,895	85.29%	1,904	13.65%	148	1.06%
2016	12,017	85.68%	1,621	11.56%	388	2.77%
2020	13,698	85.78%	2,107	13.19%	164	1.03%
2024	14,593	86.59%	2,132	12.65%	128	0.76%

United States Senate election results for Brown County, Texas1
Year	Republican		Democratic		Third party(ies)	
Year	No.	%	No.	%	No.	%
2024	14,108	84.08%	2,359	14.06%	313	1.87%

United States Senate election results for Brown County, Texas2
Year	Republican		Democratic		Third party(ies)	
Year	No.	%	No.	%	No.	%
2020	13,482	85.57%	1,965	12.47%	308	1.95%

Texas Gubernatorial election results for Brown County
Year	Republican		Democratic		Third party(ies)	
Year	No.	%	No.	%	No.	%
2022	10,853	88.34%	1,308	10.65%	124	1.01%

== Education ==
School districts include:

- Bangs Independent School District
- Blanket Independent School District
- Brookesmith Independent School District
- Brownwood Independent School District
- Cross Plains Independent School District
- Early Independent School District
- May Independent School District
- Mullin Independent School District
- Rising Star Independent School District
- Zephyr Independent School District

The community college for the county is Ranger Junior College District, according to the Texas Education Code.

== See also ==
- National Register of Historic Places listings in Brown County, Texas
- Recorded Texas Historic Landmarks in Brown County
