= List of airports in Texas =

This list of airports in Texas (a U.S. state) is grouped by type and sorted by location. It contains all public-use and military airports in the state. Some private-use and former airports may be included where notable, such as airports that were previously public-use, those with commercial enplanements recorded by the FAA or airports assigned an IATA airport code.

== Airports ==
This list contains the following information:

- **City served** – The city generally associated with the airport, as per the airport's master record with the Federal Aviation Administration. This is not always the actual location since some airports are located in smaller towns outside of the city they serve. It is not meant to be a complete list of cities served, which can be found in or added to each airport's Wikipedia article.
- **FAA** – The location identifier assigned by the Federal Aviation Administration (FAA). These are linked to each airport's page at the Texas Department of Transportation.
- **IATA** – The airport code assigned by the International Air Transport Association (IATA). Those that do not match the FAA code are shown in bold.
- **ICAO** – The location indicator assigned by the International Civil Aviation Organization (ICAO).
- **Airport name** – The official airport name. Those shown in **bold** indicate the airport has scheduled passenger service on commercial airlines.
- **Role** – One of four FAA airport categories, as per the 2021–2025 National Plan of Integrated Airport Systems (NPIAS) report released September 2020:
  - P-s: Commercial service – primary are publicly owned airports that receive scheduled passenger service and have more than 10,000 passenger boardings (enplanements) each year. Each primary airport is sub-classified by the FAA as one of the following four "hub" types (s):
    - L: Large hub that accounts for at least 1% of total U.S. passenger enplanements.
    - M: Medium hub that accounts for between 0.25% and 1% of total U.S. passenger enplanements.
    - S: Small hub that accounts for between 0.05% and 0.25% of total U.S. passenger enplanements.
    - N: Nonhub that accounts for less than 0.05% of total U.S. passenger enplanements, but more than 10,000 annual enplanements.
  - CS: Commercial service – nonprimary are publicly owned airports that receive scheduled passenger service and have at least 2,500 passenger boardings each year.
  - R: Reliever airports are designated by the FAA to relieve congestion at a large commercial service airport and to provide more general aviation access to the overall community.
  - GA: General aviation airports are the largest single group of airports in the U.S. airport system. They are public-use airports that do not have scheduled service or have scheduled service with less than 2,500 passenger boardings each year.
- **Enplanements** – The number of enplanements (commercial passenger boardings) that occurred at the airport in calendar year 2024, as per FAA records released September 2025.

| City served | FAA | IATA | ICAO | Airport name | Role | Enplanements (2024) |
|---|---|---|---|---|---|---|
| | | | | **Commercial service – primary airports** | | |
| Abilene | ABI | ABI | KABI | **Abilene Regional Airport** | P-N | 94,579 |
| Amarillo | AMA | AMA | KAMA | **Rick Husband Amarillo International Airport** | P-N | 402,315 |
| Austin | AUS | AUS | KAUS | **Austin–Bergstrom International Airport** | P-L | 10,678,073 |
| Beaumont | BPT | BPT | KBPT | **Jack Brooks Regional Airport** (was Southeast Texas Regional) | P-N | 33,907 |
| Brownsville | BRO | BRO | KBRO | **Brownsville/South Padre Island International Airport** | P-N | 188,157 |
| College Station | CLL | CLL | KCLL | **Easterwood Field** | P-N | 68,316 |
| Corpus Christi | CRP | CRP | KCRP | **Corpus Christi International Airport** | P-N | 369,393 |
| Dallas | DAL | DAL | KDAL | **Dallas Love Field** | P-M | 8,654,991 |
| Dallas–Fort Worth | DFW | DFW | KDFW | **Dallas Fort Worth International Airport** | P-L | 42,351,316 |
| Del Rio | DRT | DRT | KDRT | Del Rio International Airport | P-N | 0 |
| El Paso | ELP | ELP | KELP | **El Paso International Airport** | P-S | 2,071,894 |
| Harlingen | HRL | HRL | KHRL | **Valley International Airport** | P-S | 603,561 |
| Houston | IAH | IAH | KIAH | **George Bush Intercontinental/Houston Airport** | P-L | 23,349,157 |
| Houston | HOU | HOU | KHOU | **William P. Hobby Airport** | P-M | 7,116,967 |
| Killeen | GRK | GRK | KGRK | **Killeen Regional Airport** / Robert Gray Army Airfield | P-N | 117,523 |
| Laredo | LRD | LRD | KLRD | **Laredo International Airport** | P-N | 172,726 |
| Longview | GGG | GGG | KGGG | **East Texas Regional Airport** | P-N | 35,057 |
| Lubbock | LBB | LBB | KLBB | **Lubbock Preston Smith International Airport** | P-S | 563,180 |
| McAllen | MFE | MFE | KMFE | **McAllen Miller International Airport** | P-S | 625,670 |
| Midland / Odessa | MAF | MAF | KMAF | **Midland International Air and Space Port** | P-S | 761,865 |
| San Angelo | SJT | SJT | KSJT | **San Angelo Regional Airport** (Mathis Field) | P-N | 49,493 |
| San Antonio | SAT | SAT | KSAT | **San Antonio International Airport** | P-M | 5,466,684 |
| Tyler | TYR | TYR | KTYR | **Tyler Pounds Regional Airport** | P-N | 51,296 |
| Waco | ACT | ACT | KACT | **Waco Regional Airport** | P-N | 53,849 |
| Wichita Falls | SPS | SPS | KSPS | **Wichita Falls Municipal Airport** / Sheppard Air Force Base | P-N | 29,702 |
| | | | | **Commercial service – nonprimary airports** | | |
| Victoria | VCT | VCT | KVCT | **Victoria Regional Airport** | CS | 14,006 |
| | | | | **Reliever airports** | | |
| Angleton / Lake Jackson | LBX | **LJN** | KLBX | Texas Gulf Coast Regional Airport (was Brazoria County Airport) | R | |
| Arlington | GKY | | KGKY | Arlington Municipal Airport | R | 43 |
| Austin / San Marcos | HYI | | KHYI | San Marcos Regional Airport | R | 1 |
| Dallas | RBD | RBD | KRBD | Dallas Executive Airport | R | 10 |
| Dallas / Addison | ADS | ADS | KADS | Addison Airport | R | 147 |
| Dallas / McKinney | TKI | **DTX** | KTKI | McKinney National Airport | R | 112 |
| Denton | DTO | | KDTO | Denton Enterprise Airport | R | 14 |
| Fort Worth | AFW | AFW | KAFW | Perot Field Fort Worth Alliance Airport | R | 6,550 |
| Fort Worth | FTW | FTW | KFTW | Fort Worth Meacham International Airport | R | 2,926 |
| Fort Worth | FWS | | KFWS | Fort Worth Spinks Airport | R | 11 |
| Galveston | GLS | GLS | KGLS | Scholes International Airport at Galveston | R | |
| Georgetown | GTU | | KGTU | Georgetown Executive Airport | R | 7 |
| Grand Prairie | GPM | | KGPM | Grand Prairie Municipal Airport | R | |
| Houston | EFD | EFD | KEFD | Ellington Airport (Ellington Field) | R | 255 |
| Houston | IWS | IWS | KIWS | West Houston Airport | R | 57 |
| Houston / Arcola | AXH | | KAXH | Houston Southwest Airport (Houston-Southwest) | R | |
| Houston / Conroe | CXO | CXO | KCXO | Conroe/North Houston Regional Airport | R | 10 |
| Houston / Pearland | LVJ | | KLVJ | Pearland Regional Airport (was Clover Field) | R | 12 |
| Houston / Sugar Land | SGR | SGR | KSGR | Sugar Land Regional Airport | R | 197 |
| Houston / Tomball | DWH | DWH | KDWH | David Wayne Hooks Memorial Airport | R | 31 |
| La Porte | T41 | | | La Porte Municipal Airport | R | |
| Lancaster | LNC | | KLNC | Lancaster Regional Airport (was Lancaster Airport) | R | |
| Mesquite | HQZ | | KHQZ | Mesquite Metro Airport | R | 0 |
| San Antonio | SSF | SSF | KSSF | Stinson Municipal Airport | R | 9 |
| | | | | **General aviation airports** | | |
| Alice | ALI | ALI | KALI | Alice International Airport | GA | 8 |
| Alpine | E38 | ALE | | Alpine-Casparis Municipal Airport | GA | 3 |
| Anahuac | T00 | | | Chambers County Airport | GA | 0 |
| Andrews | E11 | | | Andrews County Airport | GA | 0 |
| Aspermont | T60 | | | Stonewall County Airport | GA | 0 |
| Athens | F44 | | | Athens Municipal Airport | GA | 0 |
| Atlanta | ATA | | KATA | Hall-Miller Municipal Airport | GA | 0 |
| Bay City | BYY | BBC | KBYY | Bay City Regional Airport | GA | 0 |
| Beaumont | BMT | BMT | KBMT | Beaumont Municipal Airport | GA | 2 |
| Beeville | BEA | | KBEA | Beeville Municipal Airport | GA | 0 |
| Big Spring | BPG | | KBPG | Big Spring McMahon-Wrinkle Airport | GA | 0 |
| Bonham | F00 | | | Jones Field | GA | 0 |
| Borger | BGD | BGD | KBGD | Hutchinson County Airport | GA | 0 |
| Bowie | 0F2 | | | Bowie Municipal Airport | GA | 0 |
| Brady | BBD | BBD | KBBD | Curtis Field | GA | 0 |
| Breckenridge | BKD | BKD | KBKD | Stephens County Airport | GA | 3 |
| Brenham | 11R | | | Brenham Municipal Airport | GA | 0 |
| Bridgeport | XBP | | KXBP | Bridgeport Municipal Airport | GA | 0 |
| Brownfield | BFE | | KBFE | Terry County Airport | GA | 0 |
| Brownwood | BWD | BWD | KBWD | Brownwood Regional Airport | GA | 0 |
| Bryan | CFD | CFD | KCFD | Coulter Field | GA | 0 |
| Burnet | BMQ | | KBMQ | Burnet Municipal Airport (Kate Craddock Field) | GA | 2 |
| Caddo Mills | 7F3 | | | Caddo Mills Municipal Airport | GA | 0 |
| Cameron | T35 | | | Cameron Municipal Airpark | GA | 0 |
| Canadian | HHF | | KHHF | Hemphill County Airport | GA | 2 |
| Carrizo Springs | CZT | CZT | KCZT | Dimmit County Airport | GA | 4 |
| Carthage | 4F2 | | | Panola County Airport (Sharpe Field) | GA | 0 |
| Castroville | CVB | | KCVB | Castroville Municipal Airport | GA | 0 |
| Center | F17 | | | Center Municipal Airport | GA | 0 |
| Clarksville | LBR | | KLBR | Clarksville/Red River County Airport (J.D. Trissell Field) | GA | 0 |
| Cleburne | CPT | | KCPT | Cleburne Regional Airport (was Cleburne Municipal Airport) | GA | 4 |
| Cleveland | 6R3 | | | Cleveland Municipal Airport | GA | 0 |
| Clifton | 7F7 | | | Clifton Municipal Airport (Isenhower Field) | GA | 0 |
| Coleman | COM | COM | KCOM | Coleman Municipal Airport | GA | 0 |
| Comanche | MKN | | KMKN | Comanche County-City Airport | GA | 0 |
| Commerce | 2F7 | | | Commerce Municipal Airport | GA | 0 |
| Corsicana | CRS | CRS | KCRS | Corsicana Municipal Airport (C. David Campbell Field) | GA | 2 |
| Cotulla | COT | COT | KCOT | Cotulla-La Salle County Airport | GA | 0 |
| Crockett | DKR | | KDKR | Houston County Airport | GA | 0 |
| Cuero | T71 | | | Cuero Municipal Airport | GA | 0 |
| Dalhart | DHT | DHT | KDHT | Dalhart Municipal Airport | GA | 0 |
| Dallas | 49T | JDB | | Dallas CBD Vertiport (heliport) | GA | 0 |
| Decatur | LUD | | KLUD | Decatur Municipal Airport | GA | 1 |
| Devine | 23R | | | Devine Municipal Airport | GA | 0 |
| Dimmitt | T55 | | | Dimmitt Municipal Airport | GA | 0 |
| Dumas | DUX | | KDUX | Moore County Airport | GA | 0 |
| Eagle Lake | ELA | ELA | KELA | Eagle Lake Airport | GA | 0 |
| Eagle Pass | 5T9 | EGP | | Maverick County Memorial International Airport | GA | 0 |
| Eastland | ETN | ETN | KETN | Eastland Municipal Airport | GA | 3 |
| Edinburg | EBG | | KEBG | South Texas International Airport at Edinburg (was Edinburg Int'l) | GA | 0 |
| Edna / Ganado | 26R | | | Jackson County Airport | GA | 0 |
| Ennis | F41 | | | Ennis Municipal Airport | GA | 0 |
| Fabens | E35 | | | Fabens Airport | GA | 0 |
| Falfurrias | BKS | | KBKS | Brooks County Airport | GA | 34 |
| Floydada | 41F | | | Floydada Municipal Airport | GA | 0 |
| Fort Stockton | FST | FST | KFST | Fort Stockton-Pecos County Airport | GA | 11 |
| Fredericksburg | T82 | | | Gillespie County Airport | GA | 7 |
| Gainesville | GLE | GLE | KGLE | Gainesville Municipal Airport | GA | 0 |
| Garland | T57 | | | Garland/DFW Heloplex (heliport) | GA | 0 |
| Gatesville | GOP | | KGOP | Gatesville Municipal Airport (was City-County Airport) | GA | 0 |
| Giddings | GYB | | KGYB | Giddings-Lee County Airport | GA | 0 |
| Gilmer | JXI | | KJXI | Gilmer Municipal Airport (Fox Stephens Field) | GA | 0 |
| Gladewater | 07F | | | Gladewater Municipal Airport | GA | 0 |
| Graham | RPH | | KRPH | Graham Municipal Airport | GA | 0 |
| Granbury | GDJ | | KGDJ | Granbury Regional Airport (was Granbury Municipal Airport) | GA | 0 |
| Greenville | GVT | GVT | KGVT | Majors Airport | GA | 6 |
| Gruver | E19 | | | Gruver Municipal Airport | GA | 0 |
| Hamilton | MNZ | | KMNZ | Hamilton Municipal Airport | GA | 0 |
| Haskell | 15F | | | Haskell Municipal Airport | GA | 0 |
| Hearne | LHB | | KLHB | Hearne Municipal Airport | GA | 0 |
| Hebbronville | HBV | | KHBV | Jim Hogg County Airport | GA | 3 |
| Henderson | RFI | | KRFI | Rusk County Airport | GA | 0 |
| Hereford | HRX | | KHRX | Hereford Municipal Airport | GA | 0 |
| Hillsboro | INJ | | KINJ | Hillsboro Municipal Airport | GA | 0 |
| Hondo | HDO | HDO | KHDO | South Texas Regional Airport at Hondo (was Hondo Municipal Airport) | GA | 1 |
| Huntsville | UTS | HTV | KUTS | Huntsville Municipal Airport | GA | 2 |
| Ingleside | TFP | | KTFP | McCampbell-Porter Airport (was T. P. McCampbell Airport) | GA | 0 |
| Jacksboro | 21F | | | Jacksboro Municipal Airport | GA | 0 |
| Jacksonville | JSO | JKV | KJSO | Cherokee County Airport | GA | 2 |
| Jasper | JAS | JAS | KJAS | Jasper County Airport (Bell Field) | GA | 0 |
| Junction | JCT | JCT | KJCT | Kimble County Airport | GA | 2 |
| Kenedy | 2R9 | | | Kenedy Regional Airport | GA | 0 |
| Kerrville | ERV | ERV | KERV | Kerrville Municipal Airport (Louis Schreiner Field) | GA | 39 |
| Killeen | ILE | ILE | KILE | Skylark Field (was Killeen Municipal Airport) | GA | 0 |
| Kingsville | IKG | | KIKG | Kleberg County Airport | GA | 21 |
| Kountze / Silsbee | 45R | | | Hawthorne Field | GA | 0 |
| La Grange | 3T5 | | | Fayette Regional Air Center | GA | 0 |
| Lago Vista | RYW | | KRYW | Lago Vista TX - Rusty Allen Airport | GA | 0 |
| Lamesa | LUV | | KLUV | Lamesa Municipal Airport | GA | 0 |
| Lampasas | LZZ | | KLZZ | Lampasas Airport | GA | 0 |
| Levelland | LLN | | KLLN | Levelland Municipal Airport | GA | 0 |
| Liberty | T78 | | | Liberty Municipal Airport | GA | 0 |
| Littlefield | LIU | | KLIU | Littlefield Taylor Brown Municipal Airport | GA | 0 |
| Livingston | 00R | | | Livingston Municipal Airport | GA | 0 |
| Llano | AQO | | KAQO | Llano Municipal Airport | GA | 1,249 |
| Lockhart | 50R | | | Lockhart Municipal Airport | GA | 0 |
| Lufkin | LFK | LFK | KLFK | Angelina County Airport | GA | 0 |
| Marfa | MRF | MRF | KMRF | Marfa Municipal Airport | GA | 14 |
| Marshall | ASL | ASL | KASL | Harrison County Airport | GA | 0 |
| Memphis | F21 | | | Memphis Municipal Airport | GA | 0 |
| Mexia | LXY | | KLXY | Mexia-Limestone County Airport | GA | 0 |
| Midland | MDD | MDD | KMDD | Midland Airpark | GA | 18 |
| Midlothian / Waxahachie | JWY | | KJWY | Mid-Way Regional Airport | GA | 1 |
| Mineral Wells | MWL | MWL | KMWL | Mineral Wells Regional Airport | GA | 39 |
| Monahans | E01 | MIF | | Roy Hurd Memorial Airport | GA | 3 |
| Morton | F85 | | | Cochran County Airport | GA | 0 |
| Mount Pleasant | OSA | | KOSA | Mount Pleasant Regional Airport | GA | 0 |
| Mount Vernon | F53 | | | Franklin County Airport | GA | 0 |
| Muleshoe | 2T1 | | | Muleshoe Municipal Airport | GA | 0 |
| Nacogdoches | OCH | OCH | KOCH | Nacogdoches A.L. Mangham Jr. Regional Airport | GA | 3 |
| New Braunfels | BAZ | | KBAZ | New Braunfels National Airport | GA | 82 |
| Odessa | ODO | ODT | KODO | Odessa-Schlemeyer Field | GA | 35 |
| Olney | ONY | ONY | KONY | Olney Municipal Airport | GA | 0 |
| Orange | ORG | | KORG | Orange County Airport | GA | 0 |
| Ozona | OZA | OZA | KOZA | Ozona Municipal Airport | GA | 0 |
| Palacios | PSX | PSX | KPSX | Palacios Municipal Airport | GA | 0 |
| Palestine | PSN | PSN | KPSN | Palestine Municipal Airport | GA | 0 |
| Pampa | PPA | PPA | KPPA | Perry Lefors Field | GA | 0 |
| Paris | PRX | PRX | KPRX | Cox Field | GA | 0 |
| Pecos | PEQ | PEQ | KPEQ | Pecos Municipal Airport | GA | 0 |
| Perryton | PYX | | KPYX | Perryton Ochiltree County Airport | GA | 0 |
| Plainview | PVW | PVW | KPVW | Hale County Airport | GA | 0 |
| Pleasanton | PEZ | | KPEZ | Pleasanton Municipal Airport | GA | 0 |
| Port Isabel | PIL | | KPIL | Port Isabel-Cameron County Airport | GA | 0 |
| Port Lavaca | PKV | | KPKV | Calhoun County Airport | GA | 0 |
| Post | 5F1 | | | Post-Garza County Municipal Airport | GA | 30 |
| Quanah | F01 | | | Quanah Municipal Airport | GA | 0 |
| Refugio | RFG | RFG | KRFG | Rooke Field | GA | 0 |
| Robstown | RBO | | KRBO | Nueces County Airport | GA | 0 |
| Rockport | RKP | RKP | KRKP | Aransas County Airport | GA | 0 |
| Rockwall | F46 | | | Ralph M. Hall/Rockwall Municipal Airport (was Rockwall Municipal) | GA | 0 |
| San Antonio | SKF | SKF | KSKF | Lackland Air Force Base / Kelly Field Annex (was Kelly AFB) | GA | 403 |
| Seminole | GNC | | KGNC | Gaines County Airport | GA | 0 |
| Seymour | 60F | | | Seymour Municipal Airport | GA | 0 |
| Sherman / Denison | GYI | PNX | KGYI | North Texas Regional Airport (Perrin Field) (was Grayson County Airport) | GA | 5 |
| Slaton | F49 | | | City of Slaton/Larry T Neal Memorial Airport (was Slaton Municipal Airport) | GA | 0 |
| Smithville | 84R | | | Smithville Crawford Municipal Airport | GA | 0 |
| Snyder | SNK | SNK | KSNK | Winston Field | GA | 0 |
| Spearman | E42 | | | Major Samuel B. Cornelius Field (was Spearman Municipal Airport) | GA | 0 |
| Stamford | F56 | | | Arledge Field | GA | 0 |
| Stephenville | SEP | SEP | KSEP | Stephenville Clark Regional Airport (was Clark Field Municipal Airport) | GA | 8 |
| Sulphur Springs | SLR | SLR | KSLR | Sulphur Springs Municipal Airport | GA | 0 |
| Sweetwater | SWW | SWW | KSWW | Avenger Field | GA | 0 |
| Taylor | T74 | | | Taylor Municipal Airport | GA | 0 |
| Temple | TPL | TPL | KTPL | Draughon-Miller Central Texas Regional Airport | GA | 2 |
| Terrell | TRL | TRL | KTRL | Terrell Municipal Airport | GA | 0 |
| Tulia | I06 | | | City of Tulia/Swisher County Municipal Airport | GA | 0 |
| Uvalde | UVA | UVA | KUVA | Garner Field | GA | 17 |
| Van Horn | VHN | VHN | KVHN | Culberson County Airport | GA | 0 |
| Vega | E52 | | | Oldham County Airport | GA | 0 |
| Vernon | F05 | | | Wilbarger County Airport | GA | 0 |
| Waco | PWG | | KPWG | McGregor Executive Airport | GA | 0 |
| Waco | CNW | CNW | KCNW | TSTC Waco Airport (Texas State Technical College) | GA | 0 |
| Wellington | F06 | | | Marian Airpark | GA | 0 |
| Weslaco | TXW | | KTXW | Mid Valley Airport | GA | 0 |
| Wharton | ARM | WHT | KARM | Wharton Regional Airport | GA | 0 |
| Wichita Falls | CWC | KIP | KCWC | Kickapoo Downtown Airport | GA | 0 |
| Wink | INK | INK | KINK | Winkler County Airport | GA | 0 |
| Winnie / Stowell | T90 | | | Chambers County-Winnie Stowell Airport | GA | 0 |
| Winnsboro | F51 | | | Winnsboro Municipal Airport | GA | 0 |
| | | | | **Other public-use airports** (not listed in NPIAS) | | |
| Abernathy | F83 | | | Abernathy Municipal Airport | | |
| Agua Dulce | 67T | | | Old Hoppe Place Airport (former private-use, FAA: 67TX) | | |
| Albany | T23 | | | Albany Municipal Airport | | 7 |
| Alpine | 1E2 | | | Terlingua Ranch Airport | | |
| Alvin | 6R5 | | | Alvin Airpark | | |
| Amarillo | 1E7 | | | Buffalo Airport | | |
| Amarillo | 1E4 | | | Palo Duro Airport | | |
| Amarillo | TDW | TDW | KTDW | Tradewind Airport | | |
| Angleton | 7R9 | | | Bailes Airport | | |
| Angleton | 81D | | | Flyin Tiger Airport (was Flyin' Tiger Field) | | |
| Archer City | T39 | | | Archer City Municipal Airport | | |
| Austin | EDC | | KEDC | **Austin Executive Airport** (was Bird's Nest Airport, FAA: 6R4) | | 60 |
| Ballinger | E30 | | | Bruce Field | | |
| Baytown | HPY | HPY | KHPY | Baytown Airport | | |
| Baytown | 54T | | | RWJ Airpark | | |
| Bellville | 06R | | | Grawunder Field | | |
| Big Lake | E41 | | | Reagan County Airport | | 0 |
| Bishop | 07R | | | Bishop-Windham Airport | | |
| Caldwell | RWV | | KRWV | Caldwell Municipal Airport | | |
| Canton | 7F5 | | | Canton-Hackney Airport | | |
| Celina | T80 | | | Bishop's Landing Airport | | |
| Celina | 9S1 | | | Four Winds Airport (former private-use, FAA: 9TS1) | | |
| Childress | CDS | CDS | KCDS | Childress Municipal Airport | | |
| China Spring | 3T8 | | | Wildcat Canyon Airport | | |
| Cisco | 3F2 | | | Cisco Municipal Airport | | |
| Clarendon | E34 | | | Smiley Johnson Municipal Airport (Bass Field) | | |
| Collinsville | T32 | | | Sudden Stop Airport | | |
| Colorado City | T88 | | | Colorado City Airport | | |
| Columbus | 66R | | | Robert R. Wells Jr. Airport | | |
| Conway | 55T | | | Eagles Aerodrome | | |
| Crane | E13 | CCG | | Crane County Airport | | |
| Crosbyton | 8F3 | | | Crosbyton Municipal Airport | | |
| Crystal City | 20R | | | Crystal City Municipal Airport | | |
| Daingerfield | 8F5 | | | Greater Morris County Airport | | |
| Dallas | F69 | | | Air Park-Dallas | | |
| Dallas | 1F7 | | | Airpark East | | |
| Decatur | 76T | | | Bishop Airport | | |
| Decatur | 58T | | | Heritage Creek Airstrip | | |
| Decatur | 09T | | | Lazy G Bar Ranch Airport (was FAA: 09TA, 82T, 82TS) | | |
| Dell City | 2E5 | | | Dell City Municipal Airport | | |
| Denver City | E57 | | | Denver City Airport | | |
| DeSoto | 73T | | | DeSoto Heliport | | |
| Dilley | 24R | | | Dilley Airpark | | |
| Dorchester | X65 | | | TXAerosport Aerodrome | | |
| Dryden | 6R6 | | | Terrell County Airport | | |
| Dublin | 9F0 | | | Dublin Municipal Airport | | |
| Eldorado | 27R | | | Eldorado Airport | | |
| Ferris / Red Oak | 12T | | | Ferris Red Oak Muni Heliport | | |
| Fort Worth | T67 | | | Hicks Airfield | | |
| Fort Worth | 4T2 | | | Kenneth Copeland Airport | | |
| Fort Worth | 50F | | | Bourland Field | | |
| Fort Worth | 9F9 | | | Sycamore Strip | | |
| Frankston | T25 | | | Aero Estates Airport | | |
| Freer | T19 | | | Duval-Freer Airport | | |
| Friona | X54 | | | Benger Air Park | | |
| Fulshear | X09 | | | Covey Trails Airport | | |
| George West | 8T6 | | | Live Oak County Airport | | |
| Goldthwaite | T37 | | | Goldthwaite Municipal Airport (opened 2010) | | |
| Gonzales | T20 | | | Roger M. Dreyer Memorial Airport (was Gonzales Municipal Airport) | | 6 |
| Gordonville | 3T0 | | | Cedar Mills Airport | | |
| Graford | F35 | | | Possum Kingdom Airport | | |
| Groveton | 33R | | | Groveton-Trinity County Airport | | |
| Hallettsville | 34R | | | Hallettsville Municipal Airport | | |
| Higgins | 1X1 | | | Higgins-Lipscomb County Airport | | |
| Horseshoe Bay | DZB | | KDZB | Horseshoe Bay Resort Airport (was Horseshoe Bay Airpark, FAA: 4XS7) | | |
| Houston | TME | | KTME | Houston Executive Airport (was Air Rice Airport, FAA: 78T) | | 24 |
| Houston | T51 | | | Dan Jones International Airport (was May Airport) | | |
| Houston | 2H5 | | | Houston Fort Bend Airport (was Happy Landings Airport) | | |
| Iraan | 2F0 | IRB | | Iraan Municipal Airport | | |
| Jayton | 22F | | | Kent County Airport | | |
| Jefferson | 24F | | | Cypress River Airport | | |
| Jefferson | 6F7 | | | Manning Field | | |
| Justin | 3T6 | | | Clark Airport | | |
| Justin | 16X | | | Propwash Airport | | |
| Justin | XA0 | | | Prose Field (former private-use, FAA: XA00) | | |
| Kirbyville | T12 | | | Kirbyville Airport | | |
| Knox City | F75 | | | Harrison Field of Knox City | | |
| Kress | 29F | | | Joe Vaughn Spraying Airport | | |
| Krum | E58 | | | Bird Dog Airfield | | |
| Lake Dallas | 30F | | | Lakeview Airport | | |
| Lakeway | 3R9 | | | Lakeway Airpark | | |
| Leakey | 49R | | | Real County Airport | | 3 |
| Lindsay | 7T0 | | | Freedom Field | | |
| Louise | T26 | | | Flying V Ranch Airport | | |
| Lubbock | F82 | | | Lubbock Executive Airpark | | |
| Luling | T91 | | | The Carter Memorial Airport | | |
| Madisonville | 51R | | | Madisonville Municipal Airport | | |
| Manvel | 3T2 | | | Wolfe Air Park | | |
| Marlin | T15 | | | Marlin Airport | | |
| Mason | T92 | | | Mason County Airport | | |
| McCamey | E48 | | | Upton County Airport | | 5 |
| McKinney | T31 | | | Aero Country Airport | | |
| McLean | 2E7 | | | McLean/Gray County Airport | | |
| Menard | T50 | | | Menard County Airport | | |
| Miami | 3E0 | | | Miami-Roberts County Airport | | |
| Midland | 7T7 | | | Skywest Airport (Skywest Airport Inc.) | | |
| Mineola | 3F9 | | | Mineola Airport (Wisener Field) | | |
| Mineola / Quitman | JDD | | KJDD | Wood County Airport (Collins Field) | | |
| Mount Selman | 6X0 | | | Tarrant Field | | |
| Munday | 37F | | | Munday Municipal Airport | | |
| Navasota | 60R | | | Navasota Municipal Airport | | 2 |
| Newton | 61R | | | Newton Municipal Airport | | |
| Paducah | 3F6 | | | Dan E. Richards Municipal Airport | | |
| Palmer | T13 | | | Dallas South Port Airport | | |
| Panhandle | T45 | | | Panhandle-Carson County Airport | | |
| Pearland | T79 | | | Skyway Manor Airport | | |
| Pearsall | T30 | | | McKinley Field | | |
| Pineland | T24 | | | Pineland Municipal Airport | | |
| Plains | F98 | | | Yoakum County Airport | | |
| Ponder | 74T | | | Hicks Airport (former private-use, FAA: 7TS4) | | |
| Port Aransas | RAS | | KRAS | Mustang Beach Airport | | |
| Port Mansfield | T05 | | | Charles R. Johnson Airport | | 10 |
| Portland | 9R5 | | | Hunt Airport | | |
| Presidio | PRS | | KPRS | Presidio Lely International Airport | | |
| Quinlan | T14 | | | Rockin M Airport | | |
| Ranger | F23 | RGR | | Ranger Municipal Airport | | |
| Rankin | 49F | | | Rankin Airport | | 0 |
| Rhome | T76 | | | Rhome Meadows Airport | | |
| Rio Grande City | 67R | | | Rio Grande City Municipal Airport | | |
| Roanoke | 52F | | | Northwest Regional Airport | | |
| Rockdale | RCK | RCK | KRCK | H. H. Coffield Regional Airport | | |
| Rocksprings | ECU | | KECU | Edwards County Airport | | |
| Rockwall | T48 | | | Poetry Flying Ranch Airport | | |
| Rosenberg | T54 | | | Lane Airpark | | |
| Rotan / Roby | 56F | | | Fisher County Airport | | |
| San Antonio | 5C1 | | | Boerne Stage Field | | 2 |
| San Antonio | 1T7 | | | Kestrel Airpark | | |
| San Antonio | T94 | | | Twin-Oaks Airport | | |
| San Antonio | 8T8 | | | San Geronimo Airpark | | |
| San Antonio | 1T8 | | | Bulverde Airpark | | |
| San Antonio | 74R | | | Horizon Airport | | |
| San Augustine | 78R | | | San Augustine County Airport | | |
| San Saba | 81R | | | San Saba County Municipal Airport | | |
| Sanger | T87 | | | Flying C Airport | | |
| Sanger | T58 | | | Ironhead Airport | | |
| Sanger | 6X8 | | | Vultures Row Airport (former private-use, FAA: 6XS8) | | |
| Seguin | E70 | | | Huber Airpark (Huber Airpark Civic Club LLC) | | |
| Shamrock | 2F1 | | | Shamrock Municipal Airport | | |
| Sherman | SWI | | KSWI | Sherman Municipal Airport | | |
| Sinton | T69 | | | Alfred C. 'Bubba' Thomas Airport (was San Patricio County Airport) | | |
| Slidell | T28 | | | Cain Airport | | |
| Somerset | 53T | | | Cannon Field (former private-use, FAA: 53TX) | | |
| Sonora | SOA | | KSOA | Sonora Municipal Airport | | |
| Spicewood | 88R | | | Spicewood Airport | | |
| Stanton | 63F | | | Stanton Municipal Airport | | |
| Stratford | H70 | | | Stratford Field | | |
| Sunray | X43 | | | Sunray Airport | | |
| Sunrise Beach Village | 2KL | | | Sunrise Beach Airport | | |
| Tahoka | 2F4 | | | T-Bar Airport | | |
| Teague | 68F | | | Teague Municipal Airport | | |
| Throckmorton | 72F | | | Throckmorton Municipal Airport | | |
| Valley Mills | 9F1 | | | Valley Mills Municipal Airport | | |
| Waco | 73F | | | Wings For Christ International Flight Academy | | |
| Weatherford / Hudson Oaks | WEA | WEA | KWEA | Parker County Airport | | |
| Weatherford | F78 | | | Horseshoe Bend Airport | | |
| Wharton | 94R | | | Gav Air Airport | | |
| Wheeler | T59 | | | Wheeler Municipal Airport | | |
| Whitesboro | T29 | | | Flying H Ranch Airport | | |
| Wichita Falls | F14 | | | Wichita Valley Airport | | |
| Wills Point | 76F | | | Van Zandt County Regional Airport (was Wills Point Municipal Airport) | | |
| Winters | 77F | | | Winters Municipal Airport | | |
| Woodville | 09R | | | Tyler County Airport | | |
| Yoakum | T85 | | | Yoakum Municipal Airport | | |
| Zapata | APY | | KAPY | Zapata County Airport | | |
| | | | | **Other military airports** | | |
| Abilene | DYS | DYS | KDYS | Dyess Air Force Base | | 397 |
| Berclair | NGT | | KNGT | NOLF Goliad | | |
| Corpus Christi | NGP | NGP | KNGP | NAS Corpus Christi (Truax Field) | | |
| Corpus Christi | NGW | NGW | KNGW | NOLF Cabaniss Field | | |
| Corpus Christi | NWL | | KNWL | NOLF Waldron Field | | |
| Del Rio | DLF | DLF | KDLF | Laughlin Air Force Base | | 100 |
| Fort Bliss / El Paso | BIF | BIF | KBIF | Biggs Army Airfield | | 22,110 |
| Fort Cavazos / Killeen | HLR | HLR | KHLR | Yoakum–DeFrenn Army Heliport | | |
| Fort Worth | NFW | FWH | KNFW | NAS JRB Fort Worth (Carswell Field) | | 238 |
| Kingsville | NQI | NQI | KNQI | NAS Kingsville | | |
| Orange Grove | NOG | | KNOG | NALF Orange Grove | | |
| San Antonio | MDA | MDA | KMDA | Martindale Army Heliport | | |
| Seguin | SEQ | | KSEQ | Randolph AFB Auxiliary Field | | |
| Spofford | T70 | | | Laughlin AFB Auxiliary Field | | |
| Universal City | RND | RND | KRND | Randolph Air Force Base | | 0 |
| | | | | **Notable private-use airports** | | |
| Abilene | 82TS | | | Elmdale Airpark (former public-use, FAA: 6F4) | | |
| Brookshire | 1XA4 | | | Mikeska Field (former public-use, FAA: 12R) | | |
| Brownwood | 3TA4 | | | Tin Top Ranch Airport | | |
| Corpus Christi | 07TE | CUX | | Cuddihy Field | | |
| Crowell | 2XA0 | | | Foard County Airport (former public-use, FAA: 8F4) | | |
| Danbury | 07TA | | | Salaika Aviation Airport | | |
| Evadale | 4TE8 | EVA | | Ben Bruce Memorial Airpark | | |
| Graham | 10TT | | | Rosser Ranch Airport | | |
| Hamlin | 16TX | | | Hamlin Airport | | |
| Johnson City | 0TE7 | JCY | | LBJ Ranch Airport | | |
| Katy | 56TE | | | Cardiff Brothers Airport | | |
| Katy | 59TE | | | Hoffpauir Airport | | |
| Matagorda Island | XS10 | MGI | | Aransas National Wildlife Refuge Airport | | |
| McAdoo | 18XS | | | Gardner Farm Airport | | |
| Newgulf (New Gulf) | 1TX4 | | | New Gulf Airport (former public-use, FAA: T17) | | |
| Pampa | TX13 | | | Mesa Vista Ranch Airport (former public-use, FAA: BPC) | | |
| Rio Vista | 3TX6 | | | Lowell Smith Jr. Airport (owned by City of Rio Vista) | | |
| Round Mountain | XS75 | | | West Ranch Airport | | |
| Royse City | 33XA | | | Poetry Landing Airport | | |
| Seagraves | TT97 | | | Seagraves Airport | | |
| Sterling City | TS95 | | | Alvie Cole Ranch Airport | | |
| Waller | 37XA | | | Skydive Houston Airport (former public-use, FAA: 37X) | | |
| Whitney | 37XS | | | Lake Whitney Country Club Airport | | |
| | | | | **Notable former airports** | | |
| Albany | ~~6F5~~ | | | Taylor Airport (closed 2006?) | | |
| Allen | ~~0T7~~ | | | Kittyhawk Airport (closed 2011?) | | |
| Angleton | ~~T34~~ | | | Cameron Airport (closed 2004?) | | |
| Austin | ~~AUS~~ | ~~AUS~~ | ~~KAUS~~ | Robert Mueller Municipal Airport (closed 1999) | | |
| Bay City | ~~T84~~ | | | Fehmel Dusting Service Airport | | |
| Beasley | ~~5T0~~ | | | Ward Airpark | | |
| Berclair | ~~7T3~~ | | | Goliad County Industrial Airpark (now NOLF Goliad, FAA: NGT) | ~~GA~~ | |
| Big Spring | | ~~BGS~~ | | Webb Air Force Base (closed 1977) | | |
| Canyon | ~~1E9~~ | | | Maples Field | | |
| Clear Lake City | ~~CLC~~ | ~~CLC~~ | | Clear Lake Metro Port (closed 1986) | | |
| Collinsville | ~~2T4~~ | | | Hayesport Airport (closed 2003?) | | |
| De Leon | ~~04F~~ | | | De Leon Municipal Airport (closed 1999?) | | |
| DeSoto | ~~F66~~ | | | Carroll Air Park (closed 2004?) | | |
| El Paso | ~~T27~~ | | | Horizon Airport (closed 2014) | | |
| Follett | ~~T93~~ | | | Follett/Lipscomb County Airport (closed 2026) | | |
| Fort Worth | ~~GSW~~ | ~~GSW~~ | ~~KGSW~~ | Greater Southwest International Airport (closed 1972?) | | |
| Fort Worth | ~~F04~~ | | | Saginaw Airport (closed 2003?) | | |
| Gruver | ~~2E3~~ | | | Cluck Ranch Airport (closed 2010?) | | |
| Hallettsville | ~~40X~~ | | | Hound Run Airport (closed 2012?) | | |
| Hallettsville | ~~1T9~~ | | | Lesikar Ranch Airport (closed 2010?) | | |
| Houston | ~~EYQ~~ | | ~~KEYQ~~ | Weiser Airpark (closed 2019) | | |
| Houston | ~~O07~~ | | | Westheimer Air Park (closed 2015) | | |
| Houston | ~~39R~~ | | | Flyin' B Airport | | |
| Houston / Alief | ~~AAP~~ | ~~AAP~~ | ~~KAAP~~ | Andrau Airpark (closed 1998) | | |
| Johnson City | ~~48T~~ | | | Bamberger Ranch Airport (closed 2003?) | | |
| Katy | ~~9X9~~ | | | Sack-O-Grande Acroport (closed 2014) | | |
| Kaufman | ~~K00~~ | | | Hall Airport (closed 2010?) | | |
| League City | ~~SPX~~ | ~~SPX~~ | | Houston Gulf Airport (closed 2002?) | | |
| Leander | ~~77T~~ | | | Kittie Hill Airport (closed 2013-2014) | | |
| Nocona | ~~F48~~ | | | Nocona Airport (closed 2008?) | | |
| Porter Heights | ~~9X1~~ | | | North Houston Airport (was Williams Airport) (closed 2021) | | |
| Robert Lee | ~~54F~~ | | | Robert Lee Airport | | |
| San Angelo | ~~GOF~~ | ~~GOF~~ | ~~KGOF~~ | Goodfellow Air Force Base (base open, runways closed) | | |
| Sanger | ~~58F~~ | | | Lane Field | | |
| Seguin | ~~83R~~ | | | Glen Beicker Ranch Airport (closed 2009?) | | |
| Stratford | ~~3E7~~ | | | Pronger Bros. Ranch Airport (closed 2010?) | | |
| Waco | ~~54X~~ | | | Boyd Field (closed 2010?) | | |

== See also ==
- Essential Air Service
- Wikipedia:WikiProject Aviation/Airline destination lists: North America#Texas
- Texas World War II Army Airfields
- List of airports in the Greater Houston Area
