= List of airports in the Greater Houston Area =

Houston, Texas has many airports due to it being the 4th largest city in the United States. Here are some of the airports:

== List ==
| Airport name | Location | IATA | ICAO | LID | Longest runway length (ft) |
|---|---|---|---|---|---|
| George Bush Intercontinental Airport | Houston | IAH | KIAH | IAH | 12,001 |
| William P. Hobby Airport | Houston | HOU | KHOU | HOU | 7,602 |
| Texas Gulf Coast Regional Airport | Angleton/Lake Jackson, Texas | LJN | KLBX | LBX | 7,000 |
| Scholes International Airport at Galveston | Galveston | GLS | KGLS | GLS | 6,001 |
| Ellington Airport | Houston | EFD | KEFD | EFD | 9,001 |
| West Houston Airport | Unincorporated Western Harris County | IWS | KIWS | IWS | 3,953 |
| Houston Southwest Airport | Arcola | – | KAXH | AXH | 5,002 |
| Conroe-North Houston Regional Airport | Conroe | CXO | KCXO | CXO | 7,501 |
| Pearland Regional Airport | Unincorporated Brazoria County | – | KLVJ | LVJ | 4,313 |
| Sugar Land Regional Airport | Sugar Land | SGR | KSGR | SGR | 8,000 |
| David Wayne Hooks Memorial Airport | Tomball | DWH | KDWH | DWH | 7,009 |
| La Porte Municipal Airport | La Porte | – | – | T41 | 4,165 |
| Chambers County Airport | Unincorporated Chambers County | – | – | T00 | 3,005 |
| Cleveland Municipal Airport | Cleveland, Texas | – | – | 6R3 | 5,001 |
| Liberty Municipal Airport | Liberty, Texas | – | – | T78 | 3,801 |
| Alvin Airpark | Alvin, Texas | – | – | 6R5 | 1,500 |
| Flyin Tiger Airport | Angleton | – | – | 81D | 2,261 |
| Bailes Airport | Angleton | – | – | 7R9 | 2,060 |
| Baytown Airport | Baytown | HPY | KHPY | HPY | 4,334 |
| RWJ Airpark | Beach City, Texas | – | – | 54T | 5,035 |
| Ward Airpark | Beasley | – | – | 5T0 | 3,110 |
| Covey Trails Airport | Fulshear | – | – | X09 | 3,352 |
| Dry Creek Airport | Cypress, Texas | – | – | TS07 | 3,580 |
| Houston Executive Airport | Brookshire, Texas | – | KTME | TME | 6,610 |
| Dan Jones International Airport | Tomball | – | – | T51 | 3,440 |
| Flyin' B Airport | Unincorporated Brazoria County | – | – | 39R | 2,100 |
| Houston Fort Bend Airport | Unincorporated Fort Bend | – | – | 2H5 | 4,400 |
| Sack-O-Grande Acroport | Unincorporated Harris County | – | – | 9X9 | 3,950 |
| Wolfe Airpark | Manvel | – | – | 3T2 | 2,910 |
| Skyway Manor Airport | Pearland | – | – | T79 | 2,550 |
| Lane Airpark | Rosenberg, Texas | – | – | T54 | 3,200 |
| Skydive Houston Airport | Unincorporated Waller County | – | – | 37XA | 4,190 |
| Gloster Aerodrome | Sealy, Texas | – | – | 1XA7 | 3,350 |
