= Horizon Airport =

Horizon Airport may refer to:

- Horizon Airport (El Paso, Texas) in El Paso, Texas, United States (FAA: T27)
- Horizon Airport (San Antonio, Texas) in San Antonio, Texas, United States (FAA: 74R)
