= T74 =

T74 or T-74 may refer to:

== Aviation ==
- English Electric Canberra T.74, a British-built trainer aircraft
- Pratt & Whitney Canada T74, a turboshaft engine
- Taylor Municipal Airport, in Williamson County, Texas, United States

== Military ==
- INS Kondul (T74), a patrol vessel of the Indian Navy
- T74 machine gun
- Type 74, a Japanese main battle tank
- Object 450, an unrealized Soviet tank designed by Alexander Alexandrovich Morozov
