= TDW (disambiguation) =

TDW may refer to one of the following:

- TDW (Gesellschaft für verteidigungstechnische Wirksysteme), a European weapons manufacturer;
- Three-Day Week, one of several measures introduced in the United Kingdom by the Conservative Government of 1970–1974 to help conserve electricity;
- The Dark World, a science fantasy novel by Henry Kuttner;
- Tidewater Inc. (NYSE:TDW), an international petroleum service company;
- The Daily WTF, a humorous blog on software engineering disasters;
- Borland Turbo Debugger for Windows 3
- Tradewind Airport, IATA code TDW
