= Rankin Airport =

Rankin Airport may refer to:

- Rankin Airport (Missouri) in Maryville, Missouri, United States (FAA: 78Y)
- Rankin Airport (Texas) in Rankin, Texas, United States (FAA: 49F)
