= Liberty County Airport =

Liberty County Airport may refer to:

- Liberty County Airport (Georgia) in Liberty County, Georgia, United States (FAA: 2J2)
- Liberty County Airport (Montana) in Liberty County, Montana, United States (FAA: LTY)
- Liberty Municipal Airport in Liberty County, Texas, United States (FAA: T78)
- MidCoast Regional Airport at Wright Army Airfield in Liberty County, Georgia, United States (FAA: LHW)

== See also ==
- Liberty Airport (disambiguation)
