= T30 =

T30 may refer to:

== Aviation ==
- McKinley Field, in Frio County, Texas, United States
- Slingsby T.30 Prefect, a British glider
- Terzi T30 Katana, an Italian aerobatic monoplane

== Other uses ==
- T.30 (ITU-T recommendation), a fax protocol
- Cooper T30, a British racing car
- German torpedo boat T30
- IBM ThinkPad T30, a laptop computer
- Tanabe Station, in Higashisumiyoshi-ku, Osaka, Japan
- T-30 Citycruiser, a Canadian bus
- T30 Heavy Tank, an American tank project
- T30 Howitzer Motor Carriage, an American self-propelled gun
