= Atlanta Municipal Airport =

Atlanta Municipal Airport may refer to:

- Atlanta Municipal Airport (Michigan) in Atlanta, Michigan, United States (FAA: Y93)
- Hall-Miller Municipal Airport in Atlanta, Texas
- The former name of Hartsfield-Jackson Atlanta International Airport in Atlanta, Georgia, United States (FAA/IATA: ATL)
