= T92 =

T92 may refer to:

- INS Tillanchang (T92), a patrol vessel of the Indian Navy
- Mason County Airport (Texas)
- T92 Howitzer Motor Carriage, an American self-propelled howitzer
- T92 Light Tank, an American tank
