= Jones Airport =

Jones Airport refers to the following U.S. airports:

- Dan Jones International Airport - Harris County, Texas (Greater Houston)
- Floyd W. Jones Lebanon Airport - Lebanon, Missouri

== See also ==
- Carl T. Jones Field, officially Huntsville International Airport - Huntsville, Alabama
- Jones Field - Bonham, Texas
- Ken Jones Aerodrome - Port Antonio, Jamaica
- Tulsa Riverside Airport, formerly Richard Lloyd Jones Jr. Airport - Tulsa, Oklahoma
