= INJ =

INJ or inj may refer to:

- INJ, the FAA LID code for Hillsboro Municipal Airport, Hill County, Texas
- INJ, the Indian Railways station code for Innanje railway station, Karnataka, India
- inj, the ISO 639-3 code for Jungle Inga language, Colombia
