= Rusk County Airport =

Rusk County Airport may refer to:

- Rusk County Airport (Texas), in Henderson, Texas, United States (FAA/IATA: RFI)
- Rusk County Airport (Wisconsin), in Ladysmith, Wisconsin, United States (FAA/IATA: RCX)
