= KATA =

KATA may refer to:

- KATA (AM), a radio station (1340 AM) licensed to serve Arcata, California, United States
- KATA-CD, a low-power television station (channel 50) licensed to serve Mesquite, Texas, United States
- Hall-Miller Municipal Airport, an airport which has the ICAO KATA
- Kata, Japanese Martial arts movements
