= Liberty Airport =

Liberty Airport may refer to:

- Newark Liberty International Airport in Newark, New Jersey, United States
- Liberty Municipal Airport in Liberty, Texas, United States
- Liberty Airport (New York) was in Liberty, New York, United States

== See also ==
- Liberty County Airport (disambiguation)
