= KTYL =

KTYL may refer to:

- KTYL-FM, a radio station (93.1 FM) licensed to Tyler, Texas, United States
- Taylor Municipal Airport in Taylor, Texas, United States
