= KSEP =

KSEP may refer to:

- KSEP-LP, a low-power radio station (99.9 FM) licensed to Brookings, Oregon, United States
- Stephenville Clark Regional Airport in Stephenville, Texas (ICAO: KSEP)
