= F53 =

F53 may refer to:

- F53 (classification), a disability sport classification
- English Electric Lightning F.53, a British fighter aircraft
- Franklin County Airport (Texas)
- HMS Ausonia (F53), a Cunard ocean liner requisitioned for the Royal Navy
- HMS Janus (F53), a J-class destroyer of the Royal Navy
- HMS Undaunted (F53), a U-class destroyer of the Royal Navy
