= F41 =

F41 may refer to:

- F41 (classification), a disability sport classification
- F-41 (Michigan county highway)
- Brazilian frigate Defensora (F-41), a Niterói-class frigate of the Brazilian Navy
- Ennis Municipal Airport, in Ellis County, Texas
- Farman F.41, a French reconnaissance aircraft
- HMS Volage (F41), a V-class destroyer of the Royal Navy
- INS Taragiri (F41), a Nilgiri-class frigate of the Indian Navy
- Samsung Galaxy F41, a smartphone
