= DeSoto Heliport =

Municipal heliport in DeSoto, Texas, United States

- IATA: none; ICAO: none; FAA LID: 73T

Summary
- Airport type: Public
- Owner: City of DeSoto
- Operator: SKY Helicopters, Inc.
- Serves: DeSoto, Texas
- Location: 150 E. Danieldale Road, DeSoto, TX 75115
- Elevation AMSL: 648.5 ft (197.7 m)
- Coordinates: 32°37′54″N 096°51′19″W

Map
- Location 73T (the United States)

Helipads
Number	Length		Surface
Number	ft	m	Surface
H1	54	16	Concrete

Statistics (2015)
- Aircraft operations: 0
- Based aircraft: 0
- Source: Federal Aviation Administration

DeSoto Heliport (FAA LID: 73T) is a city-owned public heliport in DeSoto, Dallas County, Texas, United States, located 3 nautical miles (5.6 km) north of the central business district. The heliport has no IATA or ICAO designation.

The facility opened in August 2014 under joint ownership by the City of DeSoto, the Texas Department of Transportation, and the DeSoto Economic Development Corporation. It is operated by SKY Helicopters, which also operates the Garland/DFW Heloplex.

== Facilities ==
DeSoto Heliport covers 19 acres (7.7 ha) at an elevation of 648.5 feet (197.7 m) above mean sea level (AMSL), and has one helipad:

- H1: 54 x 54 ft. (16 x 16 m), Surface: Concrete

In the year ending 31 December 2018, 6 helicopters were based at the heliport, but there were no reported aircraft operations.

== See also ==
- List of airports in Texas
