= Mid Valley Airport =

Coordinates: 26.1779°N 97.9727°W

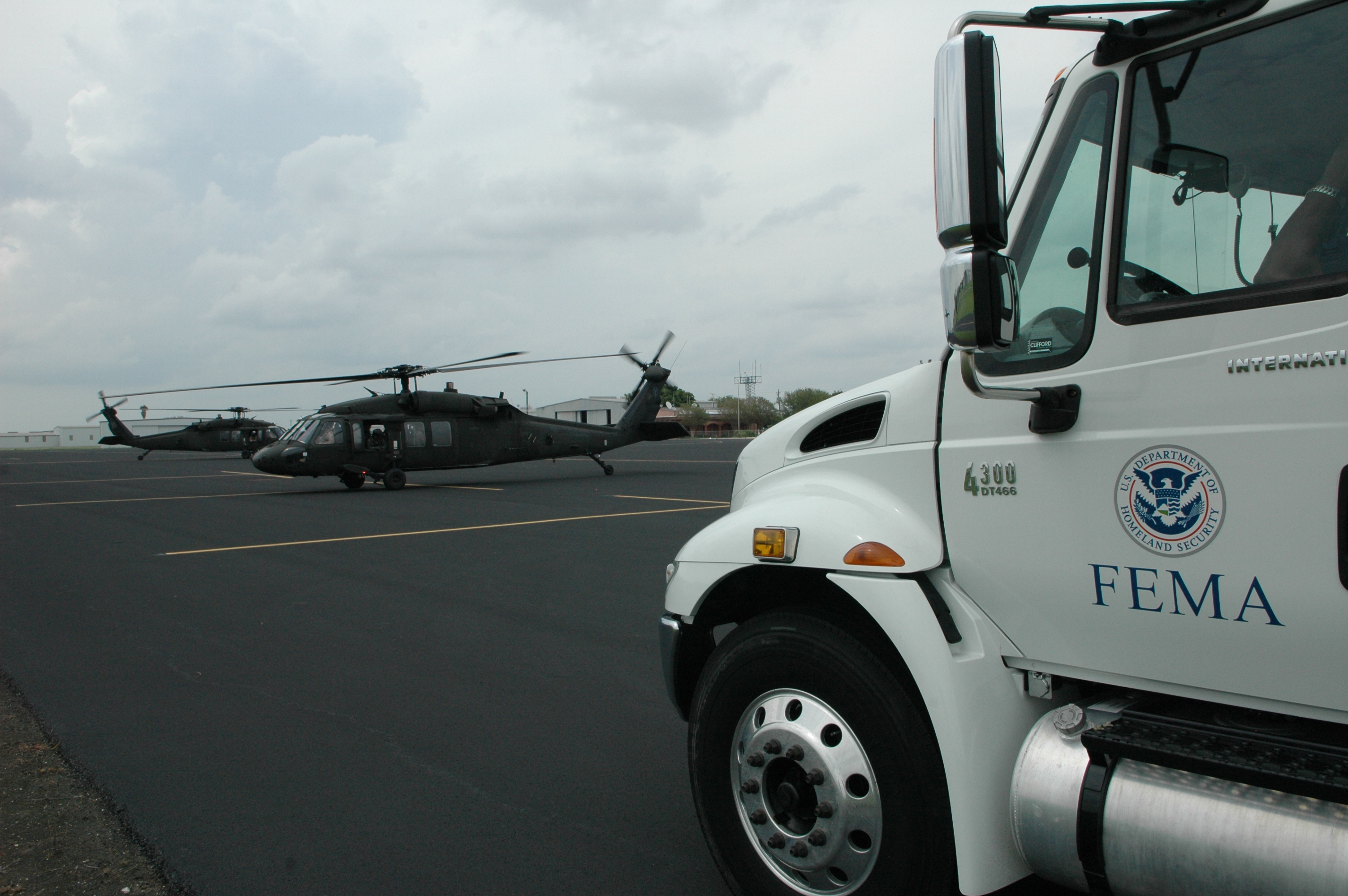
Federal Emergency Management Agency trucks and National Guard helicopters on Mid Valley Airport's runway after 2008's Hurricane Dolly

Mid Valley Airport (ICAO: KTXW, FAA LID: TXW) (formerly FAA LID: T65) is the main airport serving Weslaco, Texas, United States (not to be confused with Mid Valley Airpark (FAA LID: E98) in Los Lunas, New Mexico).

In 2021, the city partnered with the Texas Department of Transportation and other agencies to expand the airport, constructing two new hangars and six spaces for jets. The investment cost $19 million and is expected to bring 100 jobs to the community.

== Airlines and destinations ==
There is no scheduled passenger airline service.

== Cargo airlines ==
Airline	Destination
GTA Air	Dallas-Addison

== See also ==
- List of airports in Texas
