= Odessa-Schlemeyer Field =

American airport in Texas

- IATA: ODT; ICAO: KODO; FAA LID: ODO

Summary
- Airport type: Public
- Operator: City of Odessa
- Serves: Odessa, Texas
- Location: Odessa, Texas, USA
- Elevation AMSL: 3,003.6 ft / 915.5 m
- Coordinates: 31°55′17″N 102°23′13″W

Map

Runways
Direction	Length		Surface
Direction	ft	m	Surface
02/20	5,703	1,738	Asphalt
16/34	5,003	1,525	Asphalt
11/29	6,200	1,890	Asphalt

Statistics
- Annual movements: 78,000
- Based aircraft: 107

Odessa-Schlemeyer Field (IATA: ODT, ICAO: KODO, FAA LID: ODO) is an airport 5 miles northeast of Odessa, Texas, United States. The airport opened in November of 1945 and lies 10 miles west of Midland International Air and Space Port, which is the primary commercial airport for passengers traveling to the oil fields of the Permian Basin. The FAA categorizes KODO as a General Aviation airport with it serving as an alternate to Midland.

== See also ==
- List of airports in Texas
