= Cleburne Regional Airport =

Airport in Texas, United States

- IATA: none; ICAO: KCPT; FAA LID: CPT

Summary
- Airport type: Public
- Owner: City of Cleburne
- Serves: Cleburne, Texas
- Elevation AMSL: 854 ft (260 m)
- Coordinates: 32°21′14″N 097°26′02″W

Map
- Location of airport in Texas

Runways
Direction	Length		Surface
Direction	ft	m	Surface
15/33	5,697	1,736	Asphalt

Statistics (2022)
- Aircraft operations (year ending 9/26/2022): 33,124
- Based aircraft: 118
- Source: Federal Aviation Administration

Cleburne Regional Airport (ICAO: KCPT, FAA LID: CPT, formerly F18) is a city-owned, public-use airport located two nautical miles (4 km) northwest of the central business district of Cleburne, a city in Johnson County, Texas, United States. Formerly known as Cleburne Municipal Airport, it is included in the National Plan of Integrated Airport Systems for 2011–2015, which categorized it as a general aviation facility.

Although most U.S. airports use the same three-letter location identifier for the FAA and IATA, this airport is assigned CPT by the FAA but has no designation from the IATA (which assigned CPT to Cape Town International Airport in South Africa).

== Facilities and aircraft ==
Cleburne Regional Airport covers an area of 520 acres (210 ha) at an elevation of 854 feet (260 m) above mean sea level. It has one runway designated 15/33 with an asphalt surface measuring 5,697 by 100 feet (1,736 x 30 m).

For the 12-month period ending September 26, 2022, the airport had 33,124 aircraft operations, average 91 per day: 99% general aviation, 1% air taxi, and <1% military. At that time there were 118 aircraft based at this airport: 106 single-engine, 10 multi-engine, and 2 jet.

== See also ==
- List of airports in Texas
