= McCampbell–Porter Airport =

- IATA: none; ICAO: KTFP; FAA LID: TFP

Summary
- Airport type: Public
- Owner: San Patricio County
- Serves: Aransas Pass, Texas
- Elevation AMSL: 18 ft / 5 m
- Coordinates: 27°54′47″N 097°12′41″W

Map
- Location of airport in Texas

Runways
Direction	Length		Surface
Direction	ft	m	Surface
13/31	5,000	1,524	Asphalt

Statistics (2011)
- Aircraft operations: 11,100
- Based aircraft: 24
- Source: Federal Aviation Administration

McCampbell–Porter Airport (ICAO: KTFP, FAA LID: TFP, formerly T43) is a county-owned, public-use airport in San Patricio County, Texas, United States. It is located two nautical miles (4 km) north of the central business district of Ingleside, Texas. Formerly known as T. P. McCampbell Airport, it is included in the National Plan of Integrated Airport Systems for 2011–2015, which categorized it as a general aviation facility.

Although most U.S. airports use the same three-letter location identifier for the FAA and IATA, this airport is assigned TFP by the FAA but has no designation from the IATA.

== Facilities and aircraft ==
McCampbell–Porter Airport covers an area of 231 acres (93 ha) at an elevation of 18 feet (5 m) above mean sea level. It has one runway designated 13/31 with an asphalt surface measuring 5,000 by 75 feet (1,524 x 23 m).

For the 12-month period ending March 4, 2011, the airport had 11,100 general aviation aircraft operations, an average of 30 per day. At that time there were 50 aircraft based at this airport: 92% single-engine and 8% multi-engine.

== See also ==
- List of airports in Texas
