= Taylor Airport (Quinlan, Texas) =

- IATA: none; ICAO: none; FAA LID: T14

Summary
- Airport type: Public use
- Owner/Operator: Walt Meziere
- Serves: Quinlan, Texas
- Elevation AMSL: 473 ft / 144 m
- Coordinates: 32°57′09″N 096°05′45″W

Map
- Location of airport in Texas

Runways
Direction	Length		Surface
Direction	ft	m	Surface
18/36	3,120x60	951 × 18	Turf
- Sources: FAA, TxDOT

Taylor Airport (FAA LID: T14) is a privately owned, public use airport located three nautical miles (6 km) northeast of the central business district of Quinlan, a city in Hunt County, Texas, United States.

== Facilities ==
The Taylor Airport resides at an elevation of 473 feet (144 m) above mean sea level. It has one runway designated 18/36 with a turf surface measuring 3,120 by 60 feet (951 m × 18 m).

== See also ==
- List of airports in Texas
