= Abernathy Municipal Airport =

Airport in Hale County, Texas

Abernathy Municipal Airport (former Abernathy Aux. Army Airfield)
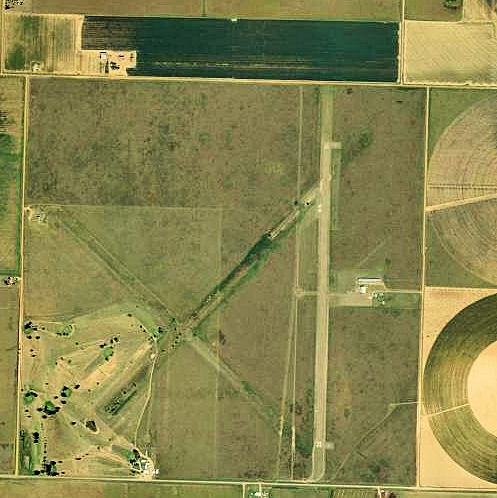
- USGS 2006 orthophoto
- IATA: none; ICAO: none; FAA LID: F83

Summary
- Airport type: Public
- Owner: City of Abernathy
- Serves: Abernathy, Texas
- Elevation AMSL: 3,327 ft (1,014 m)
- Coordinates: 33°50′45″N 101°45′47″W

Map
- Location of airport in Texas

Runways
Direction	Length		Surface
Direction	ft	m	Surface
17/35	4,000	1,219	Asphalt

Statistics (2020)
- Aircraft operations (year ending 5/16/2020): 0
- Source: Federal Aviation Administration

Abernathy Municipal Airport (FAA LID: F83) was a public use airport in Hale County, Texas, United States. It was owned by the City of Abernathy and located four nautical miles (5 mi, 7 km) east of its central business district.

== History ==
The Abernathy Municipal Airport was built during World War II and opened in November 1943 as Abernathy Auxiliary Field by the United States Army Air Forces as an auxiliary field for nearby Lubbock Army Air Field and South Plains Army Air Field. The field was initially built for use by Lubbock Army Air Field, but following the activation of South Plains Army Air Field, was assigned to that base. In 1944 after the conclusion of training operations at South Plains Army Air Field, Abernathy reverted to Lubbock Army Air Field for the duration of the war. At the end of World War II, The United States military maintained over 5,600 bases stateside and around the world. The field was declared surplus and released to the War Assets Administration for disposal. The field was given to the City of Abernathy for use as a civil airport.

== Facilities and aircraft ==
Abernathy Municipal Airport covers an area of 429 acres (174 ha) at an elevation of 3,327 feet (1,014 m) above mean sea level. It has one runway designated 17/35 with an asphalt surface measuring 4,000 by 75 feet (1,219 x 23 m). There have been no aircraft operations, the airport is closed indefinitely.

== See also ==
- Texas World War II Army Airfields
- List of airports in Texas

== Other sources ==
- This article incorporates public domain material from the Air Force Historical Research Agency
- Manning, Thomas A. (2005), History of Air Education and Training Command, 1942–2002. Office of History and Research, Headquarters, AETC, Randolph AFB, Texas OCLC 71006954, 29991467
- Shaw, Frederick J. (2004), Locating Air Force Base Sites, History’s Legacy, Air Force History and Museums Program, United States Air Force, Washington DC. OCLC 57007862, 1050653629
- Thole, Lou (1999), Forgotten Fields of America : World War II Bases and Training, Then and Now - Vol. 2. Publisher: Pictorial Histories Pub, ISBN 1-57510-051-7
