= Cannon Field =

Airport in Texas, United States

- IATA: none; ICAO: none; FAA LID: 53T

Summary
- Airport type: Public use
- Owner/Operator: Alamo Liaison Group (dba Alamo Liaison Squadron)
- Serves: Somerset, Texas
- Elevation AMSL: 610 ft (190 m)
- Coordinates: 29°12′58″N 098°32′58″W

Map
- Location of airport in Texas

Runways
Direction	Length		Surface
Direction	ft	m	Surface
16/34	2,880	878	Turf

Statistics (2011)
- Aircraft operations: 600
- Based aircraft: 13
- Source: Federal Aviation Administration

Cannon Field (FAA LID: 53T, formerly 53TX) is a privately owned, public use airport located six nautical miles (7 mi, 11 km) east of the central business district of Somerset, a city in Bexar County, Texas, United States. It is a small airport on the south side of San Antonio, located at the southwest corner of the intersection of Loop 1604 and Applewhite Road.

== History ==
Cannon Field is the home of the Alamo Liaison Squadron. The squadron primarily restores, maintains, and flies World War II liaison aircraft from their home base on the field. The squadron hosts an annual picnic and welcomes visitors.

== Facilities and aircraft ==
Cannon Field covers an area of 33 acres (13 ha) at an elevation of 610 feet (186 m) above mean sea level. It has one runway designated 16/34 with a turf surface measuring 2,880 by 100 feet (878 x 30 m).

For the 12-month period ending March 26, 2011, the airport had 600 general aviation aircraft operations, an average of 50 per month. At that time there were 13 aircraft based at this airport, all single-engine.

== See also ==
- List of airports in Texas
