= Kleberg County Airport =

- IATA: none; ICAO: KIKG; FAA LID: IKG

Summary
- Airport type: Public
- Owner: Kleberg County
- Serves: Kingsville, Texas
- Elevation AMSL: 130 ft (40 m)
- Coordinates: 27°33′03″N 098°01′51″W
- Website: KlebergCountyAirport.com

Map
- Location within Texas

Runways
Direction	Length		Surface
Direction	ft	m	Surface
13/31	6,000	1,829	Asphalt

Statistics (2011)
- Aircraft operations: 7,400
- Based aircraft: 11
- Source: Federal Aviation Administration

Kleberg County Airport (ICAO: KIKG, FAA LID: IKG) is a county-owned, public-use airport located nine nautical miles (10 miles; 17 km) west of the central business district of Kingsville, a city in Kleberg County, Texas, United States. This airport is included in the FAA's National Plan of Integrated Airport Systems for 2011–2015, which categorized it as a general aviation facility.

Although many U.S. airports use the same three-letter location identifier for the FAA and IATA, this facility is assigned IKG by the FAA but has no designation from the IATA.

== Facilities and aircraft ==
Kleberg County Airport covers an area of 295 acres (119 ha) at an elevation of 130 feet (40 m) above mean sea level. It has one runway designated 13/31 with an asphalt surface measuring 6,000 by 75 feet (1,829 by 23 m).

For the 12-month period ending March 20, 2011, the airport had 7,400 aircraft operations, an average of 20 per day: 81% general aviation, 18% military, and 1% air taxi. At that time there were 11 aircraft based at this airport: 73% single-engine, 9% jet and 18% helicopter.

== See also ==
- List of airports in Texas
