= Houston County Airport (Texas) =

- IATA: none; ICAO: KDKR; FAA LID: DKR

Summary
- Airport type: Public
- Owner: Houston County
- Location: Crockett, Texas
- Elevation AMSL: 348 ft (106 m)
- Coordinates: 31°18′25″N 095°24′14″W

Map
- Location within Texas

Runways
Direction	Length		Surface
Direction	ft	m	Surface
2/20	4,000	1,219	Asphalt

Statistics (2022)
- Aircraft operations (year ending 10/5/2022): 8,800
- Source: Federal Aviation Administration

Houston County Airport (ICAO: KDKR, FAA LID: DKR) is a public airport located three miles (5 km) southeast of the central business district of Crockett, in Houston County, Texas, United States. It is owned by Houston County.

Although most U.S. airports use the same three-letter location identifier for the FAA and IATA, Houston County Airport is assigned DKR by the FAA but has no designation from the IATA (which assigned DKR to Dakar-Yoff-Léopold Sédar Senghor International Airport in Dakar, Senegal).

== Facilities and aircraft ==
Houston County Airport covers an area of 55 acres (22 ha) which contains one Asphalt paved runway, 2/20, measuring 4,000 x 75 ft (1,219 x 23 m).

For the 12-month period ending October 5, 2022, the airport had 8,800 aircraft operations, average 24 per day, 100% of which were general aviation.

== See also ==
- List of airports in Texas
