= Orange County Airport (Texas) =

Airport in Texas, United States

Coordinates: 30°04′09″N 093°48′13″W

- IATA: none; ICAO: KORG; FAA LID: ORG

Summary
- Airport type: Public
- Owner: Orange County
- Serves: Orange, Texas
- Elevation AMSL: 13 ft (4.0 m)

Map
- Location of airport in Texas ORG (the United States)

Runways
Direction	Length		Surface
Direction	ft	m	Surface
4/22	5,500	1,676	Asphalt
13/31	3,000	914	Turf

Statistics
- Aircraft operations (2001): 11,332
- Based aircraft (2017): 29
- Source: Federal Aviation Administration

Orange County Airport (ICAO: KORG, FAA LID: ORG) is a county-owned public-use airport located three miles (5 km) southwest of the central business district of Orange, in Orange County, Texas, United States.

Although most U.S. airports use the same three-letter location identifier for the FAA and IATA, Orange County Airport is assigned ORG by the FAA but has no designation from the IATA (which assigned ORG to Zorg en Hoop Airport in Paramaribo, Suriname).

== Facilities and aircraft ==
Orange County Airport covers an area of 820 acres (330 ha) and contains two runways: 4/22 has an asphalt pavement measuring 5,500 x 75 ft (1,676 x 23 m) and 13/31 has a turf surface measuring 3,000 x 50 ft (914 x 15 m). For the 12-month period ending December 15, 2001, the airport had 11,332 aircraft operations, an average of 51 per day: 93% general aviation and 7% air taxi. In August 2017, there were 29 aircraft based at this airport: 24 single-engine, 2 multi-engine, 1 helicopter and 2 ultra-lights.

== See also ==
- List of airports in Texas
