= Buffalo Airport (Texas) =

- IATA: none; ICAO: none; FAA LID: 1E7

Summary
- Airport type: Public use
- Owner: Greg Dodson
- Serves: Amarillo, Texas
- Location: Randall County, Texas
- Elevation AMSL: 3,640 ft (1,110 m)
- Coordinates: 35°03′50″N 101°52′39″W

Map
- Location within Texas

Runways
Direction	Length		Surface
Direction	ft	m	Surface
2/20	6,200	1,890	Turf
8/26	1,600	488	Turf

Statistics (2021)
- Aircraft operations (year ending 9/11/2021): 2,175
- Based aircraft: 27
- Source: Federal Aviation Administration

Buffalo Airport (FAA LID: 1E7) is a privately owned, public use airport in Randall County, Texas, United States. It is located nine nautical miles (10.4 mi, 16.7 km) south of the central business district of Amarillo.

== Facilities and aircraft ==
Buffalo Airport covers an area of 40 acres (16 ha) at an elevation of 3,640 feet (1,109 m) above mean sea level. It has two runways with turf surfaces: 2/20 is 6,200 by 150 feet (1,890 x 46 m) and 8/26 is 1,600 by 102 feet (488 x 31 m).

For the 12-month period ending September 11, 2021, the airport had 2,175 general aviation aircraft operations, an average of 42 per week. At that time there were 27 aircraft based at this airport: 20 single-engine, 1 multi-engine and 6 ultralight.

== See also ==
- List of airports in Texas
