= Beaumont Municipal Airport =

- IATA: BMT; ICAO: KBMT; FAA LID: BMT

Summary
- Airport type: Public
- Owner: City of Beaumont
- Serves: Beaumont, Texas
- Opened: October 1, 1937
- Elevation AMSL: 32 ft (9.8 m)
- Coordinates: 30°04′13″N 094°12′54″W
- Website: https://beaumontmuni.com

Map
- Location within Texas Location within the United States

Runways
Direction	Length		Surface
Direction	ft	m	Surface
13/31	4,001	1,220	Asphalt

Statistics (2023)
- Aircraft operations (year ending 4/4/2023): 15,320
- Based aircraft: 46
- Source: Federal Aviation Administration

Beaumont Municipal Airport (IATA: BMT, ICAO: KBMT, FAA LID: BMT) is seven miles west of downtown Beaumont, in Jefferson County, Texas. The National Plan of Integrated Airport Systems for 2017–2021 categorized it as a general aviation facility.

Airlines at Beaumont operate from Jack Brooks Regional Airport (BPT) south of the city.

== Facilities ==
The airport covers 276 acres (112 ha) at an elevation of 32 feet (10 m). It has one runway: 13/31 is 4,001 by 75 feet (1,220 x 23 m) asphalt.

In the year ending April 4, 2023, the airport had 15,320 aircraft operations, average 42 per day: 95% general aviation,3% military, and 2% air taxi. At that time, 46 aircraft were based at the airport: 38 single-engine, 5 multi-engine, 1 jet and 2 helicopter.

=== History ===
The airport opened in 1937; construction was a Works Project Administration project. The airport was used during World War II by the Army Air Corps for antisubmarine patrols. In 1940, Eastern Air Lines stopped their one way daily routes between Beaumont and Houston. No regularly scheduled flights have taken place since.

=== Improvements ===
A $230,000 building replaced the original terminal building in the late 1970s. Other improvements included paved runways, taxiway, parking apron and lighting costing $593,000.

Runway and taxiways were improved in 2009; partial financing was from a $2.9 million grant from the Texas Department of Transportation.

In 2014 facilities were completely renovated. Upcoming improvements include a 12,500 sq ft hangar, a 2,500 sq ft office building, removal of a two unit T-Hangar replaced by an eight unit T-Hangar.

== See also ==
- List of airports in Texas
