= Commerce Municipal Airport =

Municipal airport in Commerce, Texas, United States

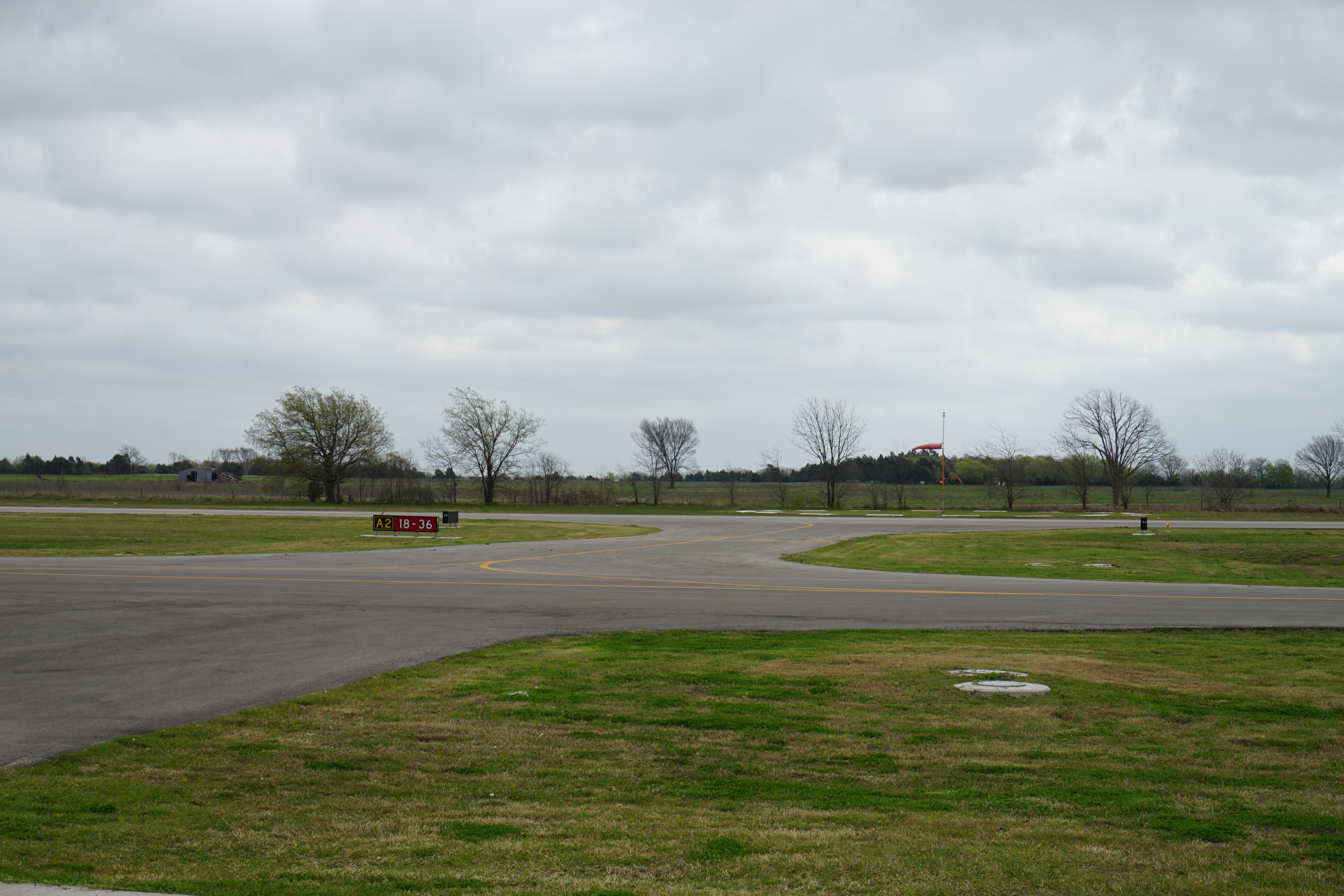
- Commerce Municipal Airport in March 2017
- IATA: none; ICAO: none; FAA LID: 2F7

Summary
- Airport type: Public
- Owner: City of Commerce
- Serves: Commerce, Texas
- Location: 1755 TX-50, Commerce, TX 75428
- Elevation AMSL: 516 ft (157 m)
- Coordinates: 33°17′34″N 095°53′47″W
- Website: https://www.commercetx.org/community-development/page/municipal-airport

Map
- Location within Texas

Runways
Direction	Length		Surface
Direction	ft	m	Surface
18/36	3,907	1,191	Asphalt

Statistics (2022)
- Aircraft operations (year ending 9/15/2022): 5,000
- Based aircraft: 16
- Sources: Federal Aviation Administration

Commerce Municipal Airport (FAA LID: 2F7) is a city-owned public airport 3 nautical miles (5.6 km) north of the central business district of Commerce, Texas, United States. The airport has no IATA nor ICAO designation.

The airport is used solely for general aviation purposes.

== Facilities ==
Commerce Municipal Airport covers 132 acres (53 ha) at an elevation of 516 ft (157 m) above mean sea level and has one runway:

- Runway 18/36: 3,907 x 60 ft. (1,191 x 18 m), Surface: Asphalt

For the year ending September 15, 2022, the airport had 5,000 aircraft operations, averaging 96 per week: 100% general aviation. 16 aircraft were then based at this airport: 14 single-engine, and 2 multi-engine.

== Accidents and incidents ==
- October 24, 1992: A Cessna 150M, registration number N7878U, impacted terrain nose-down after the pilot lost control during an abrupt turn to dodge an unidentified runway obstruction on landing. The aircraft was destroyed; the pilot and sole occupant was seriously injured and could not recall the nature of the obstruction due to head injuries. The accident was attributed to "The pilot's failure to maintain aircraft control and the inadvertent stall. A factor was the pilot's evasive maneuver to avoid an undetermined object."

== See also ==
- List of airports in Texas
