= South Texas International Airport at Edinburg =

- IATA: none; ICAO: KEBG; FAA LID: EBG

Summary
- Airport type: Public
- Owner/Operator: City of Edinburg
- Serves: Edinburg, Texas
- Location: Hidalgo County, Texas
- Elevation AMSL: 75 ft (23 m)
- Coordinates: 26°26′30″N 098°07′20″W

Map
- Location within Texas

Runways
Direction	Length		Surface
Direction	ft	m	Surface
14/32	5,000	1,524	Asphalt

Statistics (2020)
- Aircraft operations (year ending 5/6/2020): 5,340
- Source: Federal Aviation Administration

South Texas International Airport at Edinburg (ICAO: KEBG, FAA LID: EBG) is in Edinburg, Hidalgo County, Texas, 10 miles (16 km) north of the central business district of Edinburg. It received its name in July 2007, prior to which it was Edinburg International Airport.

Most U.S. airports use the same three-letter location identifier for the FAA and IATA, but this airport is EBG to the FAA and has no IATA code.

== Facilities ==
The airport covers 1,080 acres (440 ha); its one runway, 14/32, is 5,000 x 75 ft (1,524 x 23 m) asphalt. In the year ending May 6, 2020, the airport had 5,000 general aviation and 340 military aircraft operations, average 102 per week.

== See also ==
- List of airports in Texas
