= Kerrville Municipal Airport =

Airport in Kerr County, Texas

Kerrville Municipal Airport Louis Schreiner Field
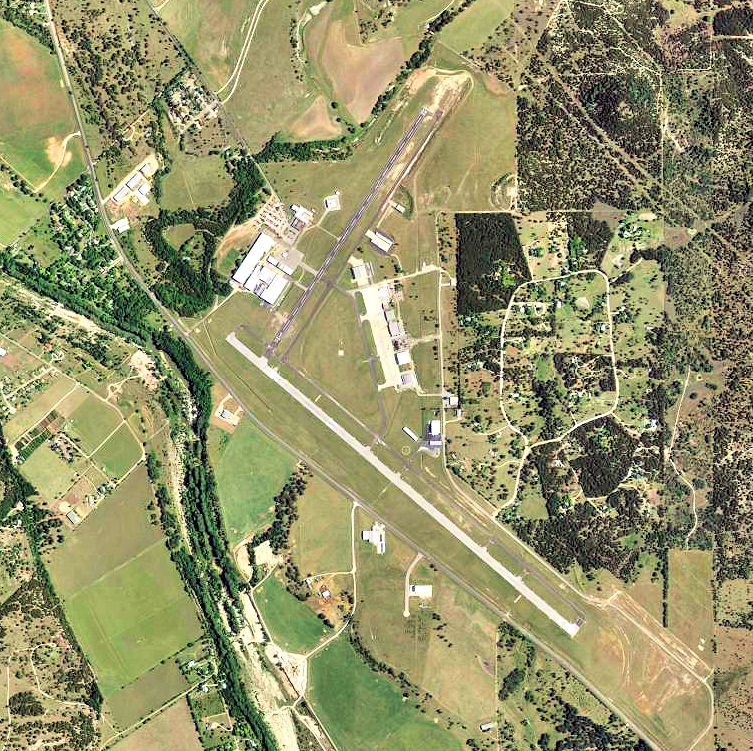
- USGS 2006 orthophoto
- IATA: ERV; ICAO: KERV; FAA LID: ERV

Summary
- Airport type: Public
- Owner: City of Kerrville
- Serves: Kerrville, Texas
- Elevation AMSL: 1,617 ft (493 m)
- Coordinates: 29°58′36″N 99°05′08″W
- Website: www.KerrvilleAirport.com

Map
- Location in Texas

Runways
Direction	Length		Surface
Direction	ft	m	Surface
3/21	3,597	1,096	Asphalt
12/30	6,004	1,830	Asphalt

Statistics (2023)
- Aircraft operations (year ending 6/2/2023): 52,136
- Based aircraft: 80
- Source: Federal Aviation Administration

Kerrville Municipal Airport (IATA: ERV, ICAO: KERV, FAA LID: ERV) (Louis Schreiner Field) is six miles southeast of Kerrville, in Kerr County, Texas. The National Plan of Integrated Airport Systems for 2011–2015 categorized it as a general aviation facility.

== History ==
The airport opened in February 1943 as Louis Schreiner Field and was used by the United States Army Air Forces as a training base. At the end of the war the airfield was determined to be excess by the military and turned over to the local government for civil use.

Trans-Texas DC-3s stopped there until 1959–60.

== Facilities ==
Kerrville Municipal Airport covers 528 acres (214 ha) at an elevation of 1,617 feet (493 m). It has two asphalt runways: 12/30 is 6,004 by 100 feet (1,830 x 30 m) and 3/21 is 3,597 by 58 feet (1,096 x 18 m).

In the year ending June 2, 2023, the airport had 52,136 general aviation operations, average 143 per day. 80 aircraft were then based at the airport: 56 single-engine, 5 multi-engine, 13 jet, 5 helicopter, and 1 glider.

== Accidents near ERV ==
- On February 1, 1959, a General Airways Douglas DC-3 crashed 11km (6.9mi) SE of Kerville Airport because of ice accretion on the aircraft flying into icy conditions. The aircraft impacted trees and caught fire. Two crew and one passenger out of the 28 on board were killed.
- On April 22, 2019 a Beechcraft Baron (Type 58) operating on behalf of Raymond James Financial crashed six miles northwest of the airport due to fuel starvation, killing the pilot and five passengers.

== See also ==
- Texas World War II Army Airfields
- List of airports in Texas
