= Andrews County Airport =

- IATA: none; ICAO: none; FAA LID: E11

Summary
- Airport type: Public
- Owner: Andrews County
- Operator: Richard Dolgener
- Serves: Andrews
- Location: Texas
- Elevation AMSL: 3,174 ft (967 m)
- Coordinates: 32°19′44″N 102°31′46″W

Map
- Location within Texas

Runways
Direction	Length		Surface
Direction	ft	m	Surface
16/34	5,816	1,773	Asphalt
11/29	3,048	929	Asphalt
2/20	3,893	1,187	Asphalt
Helipad	25	8	Asphalt

Statistics (2021)
- Aircraft operations (year ending 5/21/2021): 18,249
- Based aircraft: 18
- Source: Federal Aviation Administration

Andrews County Airport (FAA LID: E11) is located near Andrews, Texas, United States.

== Facilities and aircraft ==
Andrews County Airport is situated on 260 acres just outside Andrews, Texas, 1-mile northeast of the central business district, and contains three runways and one helipad. The longest runway is 16/34, is paved with asphalt measuring 5,816 x 75 ft (1773 x 23 m). A second runway, 11/29, also paved with asphalt, measures 3,048 x 75 ft (929 x 23 m), and 2/20, asphalt, is 3,893 x 75 (1187 x 23m). The airport's helipad measures 25 x 25 ft (8 x 8 m).

For the 12-month period ending May 21, 2021, the airport had 18,249 aircraft operations, an average of 50 per day: 70% transient general aviation, and 30% local general aviation. At that time there were 18 aircraft based at this airport: 15 single-engine and 3 multi-engine.

Andrews County Airport has one certified instrument approach procedure (IAP): An RNAV (GPS).

== See also ==
- List of airports in Texas
