= Giddings–Lee County Airport =

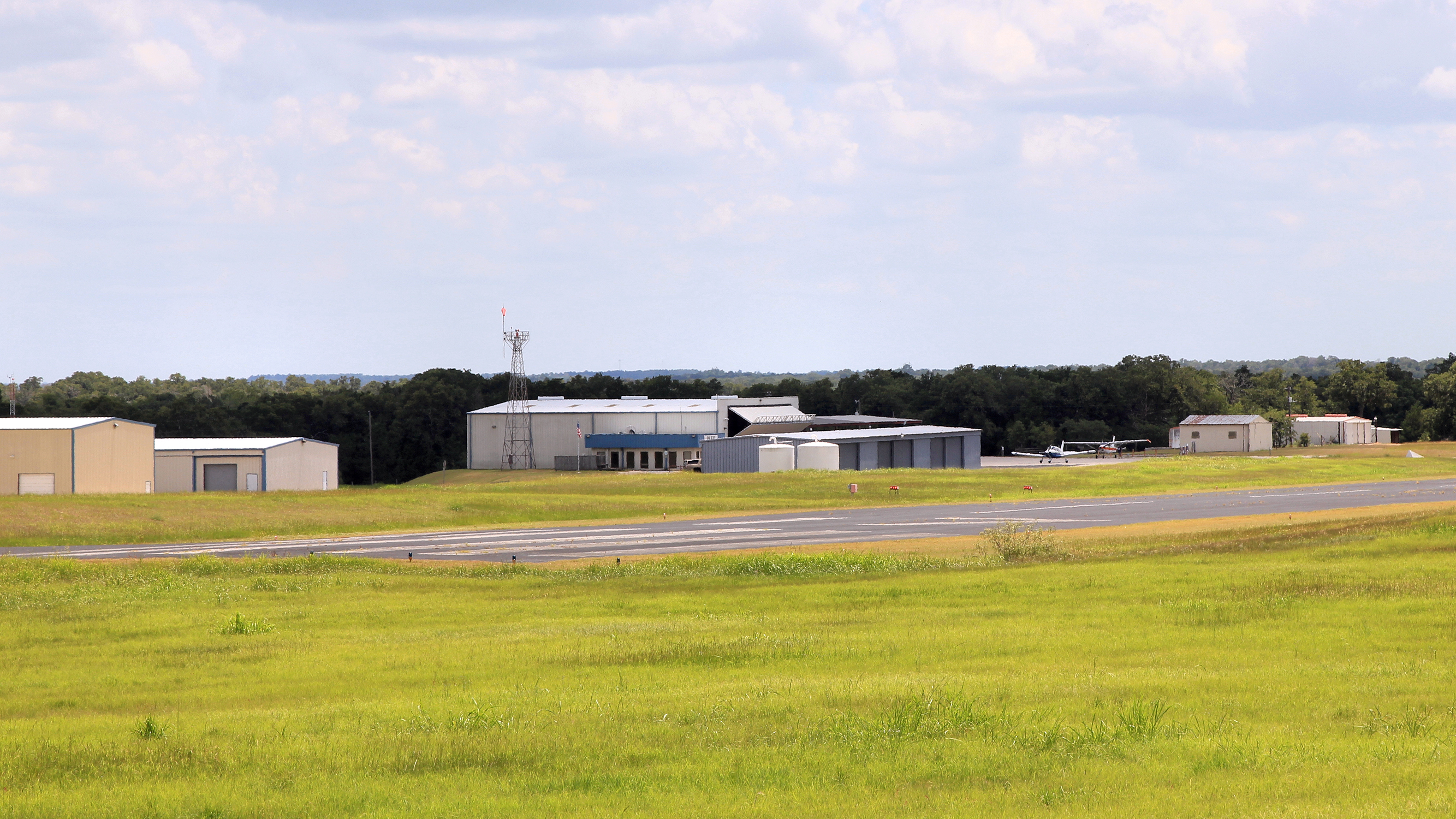
- IATA: none; ICAO: KGYB; FAA LID: GYB

Summary
- Airport type: Public
- Owner: City of Giddings & Lee County
- Serves: Giddings, Texas
- Elevation AMSL: 484 ft (148 m)
- Coordinates: 30°10′09″N 096°58′48″W

Map
- Location within Texas

Runways
Direction	Length		Surface
Direction	ft	m	Surface
17/35	4,000	1,219	Asphalt

Statistics (2023)
- Aircraft operations (year ending 5/23/2023): 13,200
- Based aircraft: 31
- Source: Federal Aviation Administration

Giddings–Lee County Airport (ICAO: KGYB, FAA LID: GYB) is in unincorporated Lee County, Texas, 3 miles (4.8 km)west of Giddings. It is owned by the City of Giddings and Lee County.

== Facilities ==
Giddings–Lee County Airport covers 84 acres (34 ha); its one runway, 17/35, is 4,000 x 75 ft (1,219 x 23 m) asphalt. In the year ending May 23, 2023, the airport had 13,200 aircraft operations, 98% general aviation, and 2% military, average 36 per day. 31 aircraft were then based at this airport: 28 single-engine, 1 multi-engine and 2 ultralight.

== See also ==
- List of airports in Texas
