= Brenham Municipal Airport =

Municipal airport in Brenham, Texas

- IATA: none; ICAO: K11R; FAA LID: 11R

Summary
- Airport type: public
- Owner: City of Brenham
- Location: Brenham, Texas
- Opened: October 1965
- Time zone: Central Time Zone (UTC−06:00)
  - Summer (DST): Central Daylight Time (UTC−05:00)
- Elevation AMSL: 318 ft / 97 m
- Coordinates: 30°13′08″N 96°22′27″W
- Website: www.cityofbrenham.org/city_government/departments/airport/index.php

Map

Runways
Direction	Length		Surface
Direction	ft	m	Surface
16/34	6,003	1,830	Asphalt

Statistics (2023)
- Based aircraft: 59
- Aircraft operations: 76/day

The Brenham Municipal Airport is an airport serving the city of Brenham and the greater Washington County area. The airport is owned and operated by the City of Brenham. There is a diner in the airport's terminal named Dreamliner Diner, though it has historically gone in and out of business and is currently closed.

== History ==
The City of Brenham began construction on the Brenham Municipal Airport in 1964, building a basic runway, apron, and taxiway. Thanks to further funding from the Federal Aviation Administration (FAA) and the city, a terminal and hangar building were added the following year. Over the years, upgrades and maintenance were underwent, mostly funded by the FAA and Texas Department of Transportation (TxDOT) and its predecessor agencies.

Since 1997, seven private hangars have been built at the airport.

In the early 2000s, a new terminal was constructed thanks to a grant from TxDOT. This terminal included facilities for the fixed-base operator (FBO), and under the agreement with the FBO a restaurant was included in the construction. This restaurant became the Southern Flyer Diner, a 1950s-styled diner, and eventually became a tourist destination for aviators and non-aviators alike. Southern Flyer Diner was a popular destination for a $100 hamburger - a restaurant an amateur pilot will use as an excuse to fly, and spend a large amount on fuel in the process.

Due to the COVID-19 pandemic and decreased traffic at the airport, Southern Flyer Diner permanently closed in August 2020. A new restaurant opened in its place in December 2021, called Dreamliner Diner. A year later, Dreamliner Diner closed. The city plans to re-open the restaurant in the future, but has not yet done so as of 2025.

== Services ==
The airport has two fixed-base operators, Brenham Aviation and Aviators Plus. Brenham Aviation is operated by the city and provides fuel, lounge, and transportation services. Aviators Plus is privately owned and provides fuel, lounge, transportation, maintenance, and repair services.

== See also ==
- List of airports in Texas
