= Ennis Municipal Airport =

Municipal airport in Ennis, Texas, United States

- IATA: none; ICAO: none; FAA LID: F41

Summary
- Airport type: Public
- Owner: City of Ennis
- Serves: Ennis, Texas
- Location: 3000 W Ennis Ave, Ennis, TX 75119
- Elevation AMSL: 500 ft (150 m)
- Coordinates: 32°19′47″N 096°39′50″W

Map
- Location within Texas

Runways
Direction	Length		Surface
Direction	ft	m	Surface
15/33	3,999	1,219	Asphalt

Statistics (2016)
- Aircraft operations: 3,720
- Based aircraft: 12
- Sources: Federal Aviation Administration unless noted otherwise

Ennis Municipal Airport (FAA LID: F41) is a city-owned public airport in Ennis, Ellis County, Texas, United States, located 2 nautical miles (3.7 km) west of the central business district. The airport has no IATA or ICAO designation.

== Facilities ==
Ennis Municipal Airport covers 30 acres (12 ha) at an elevation of 500 ft (152 m) above mean sea level and has one runway:

- Runway 15/33: 3,999 x 50 ft. (1,219 x 15 m), Surface: Asphalt

For the 12-month period ending 4 April 2016, the airport had 3,720 aircraft operations, averaging 10 per day: 97% general aviation and 3% military. 12 aircraft were then based at this airport: 83% single-engine and 17% multi-engine.

== Replacement plan ==
Initial consideration for a replacement airport began in 2005 to address maintenance problems and a lack of space; the existing runway cannot be extended economically due to proximity to FM Road 1722 and Lake Clark, and it has chronic paving problems due to poor soil and drainage. An economic feasibility assessment was done for a new 490 ac (198 ha) airport—with a 5,000 ft (1,524 m) runway capable of handling business jets—adjacent to a new 300 ac (121 ha) business park. Moving the airport would allow the redevelopment of 1,200 acres (490 ha) of land for residential purposes, and proceeds from the sale of the existing airport site will be applied to the new airport project. By September 2008, a provisional site was selected near the Texas Motorplex, with grants from the State Airport Fuel Fund (TxDOT) and the FAA to cover 90% of the cost, and the city the other 10%, with only the environmental assessment awaiting completion. However, the plans were shelved by early 2010 due to economic pressure and FAA funding cuts. The proposal has been revived as of late 2017.

== Accidents and incidents ==
- 10 January 1998: An Aero Commander 500B, registration number N556BW, struck power lines and terrain during an attempted single-engine go-around; the pilot and copilot were killed, the aircraft was destroyed, and the single passenger (who was also a commercially rated pilot) was seriously injured. After departing from nearby Lancaster Municipal Airport, the right-hand engine lost power, and the pilots shut it down and initiated a precautionary landing on Runway 15 at Ennis Municipal. The rated passenger remarked that the approach "seemed textbook perfect," but the pilots initiated a go-around for unknown reasons. As the flying pilot raised the flaps and began raising the landing gear, the nose pitched up, and the "left wing started up in what [the passenger believed] to be a V_{MC} roll." The craft clipped power lines and impacted the ground in a right-wing-low attitude, coming to rest inverted. The accident was attributed to the failure of the pilots to maintain minimum control speed (V_{MC}) during go-around, various maintenance problems with the right-hand engine, excessive gross weight, an excessively forward center of gravity, and both pilots' lack of experience in the aircraft make and model.

== See also ==
- List of airports in Texas
