= Bourland Field =

- IATA: none; ICAO: 50F; FAA LID: 50F

Summary
- Airport type: Public
- Owner: Matt Rix
- Location: 17611 Hwy 377 South, Cresson, TX 76035
- Elevation AMSL: 873 ft (266 m)
- Coordinates: 32°34′54″N 097°35′27″W
- Website: www.bourlandfield.com

Map
- Location within Texas

Runways
Direction	Length		Surface
Direction	ft	m	Surface
17/35	4,049	1,234	Asphalt

Statistics (2018)
- Aircraft operations: 46,800
- Based aircraft: 118
- Sources: Federal Aviation Administration except as noted

Bourland Field (FAA LID: 50F) is a public airport located seventeen miles (27 km) southwest of the central business district (CBD) of Fort Worth, in Parker County, Texas, United States. It was developed by Richard Bourland in September 1981 for whom the airport is named. In addition to serving as a public-use airport for southeastern Parker County, the airport also serves as an airpark for the attached housing development known as Bourland Field Estates.

The airport is used solely for general aviation purposes, including aircraft rental and flight training.

== Facilities ==
Bourland Field covers 140 acres (57 hectares) at an elevation of 873 feet (266 m) above mean sea level (AMSL) and has one runway:

- Runway 17/35: 4,049 ft × 60 ft (1,234 m × 18 m), Surface: Asphalt

For the 12-month period ending December 31, 2018, the airport had 46,800 aircraft operations, an average of 128 per day. At that time, there were 100 single-engine planes, 15 multi-engine planes, two jets, and one helicopter based at the airport. Both 100LL avgas and JetA are available, and the airport hosts several tie-downs, a community hangar, and t-hangars.

== See also ==
- List of airports in Texas
