= Kickapoo Downtown Airport =

- IATA: KIP; ICAO: KCWC; FAA LID: CWC

Summary
- Airport type: Public
- Owner: City of Wichita Falls
- Serves: Wichita Falls, Texas
- Elevation AMSL: 1,003 ft (306 m)
- Coordinates: 33°51′38″N 098°29′25″W

Map
- Location within Texas

Runways
Direction	Length		Surface
Direction	ft	m	Surface
17/35	4,450	1,356	Concrete

Statistics (2017)
- Aircraft operations (year ending 12/7/2017): 33,770
- Based aircraft: 75
- Source: Federal Aviation Administration

Kickapoo Downtown Airport (IATA: KIP, ICAO: KCWC, FAA LID: CWC, formerly T47) is a city-owned public use airport located three nautical miles (6 km) south of the central business district of Wichita Falls, a city in Wichita County, Texas, United States.

Although most U.S. airports use the same three-letter location identifier for the FAA and IATA, this airport is assigned CWC by the FAA and KIP by the IATA (which assigned CWC to Chernovtsy Airport in Chernovtsy, Ukraine).

== Facilities and aircraft ==
Kickapoo Downtown Airport covers an area of 149 acres (60 ha) at an elevation of 1,003 feet (306 m) above mean sea level. It has one runway designated 17/35 with a concrete surface measuring 4,450 by 75 feet (1,356 x 23 m).

For the 12-month period ending December 7, 2017, the airport had 33,770 aircraft operations, an average of 92 per day: 100% general aviation, <1% military and <1% air taxi. At that time there were 75 aircraft based at this airport: 57 single-engine, 15 multi-engine, and 3 jet.

== See also ==
- List of airports in Texas
