= Rhome Meadows Airport =

Privately owned airport in Rhome, Texas, United States

- IATA: none; ICAO: none; FAA LID: T76

Summary
- Airport type: Public
- Owner: Rhome Meadows Management Group
- Serves: Rhome, Texas
- Location: 2179 County Road 4421, Rhome, TX 76078
- Elevation AMSL: 900 ft / 274 m
- Coordinates: 33°08′57″N 097°29′46″W

Map

Runways
Direction	Length		Surface
Direction	ft	m	Surface
13/31	3,700	1,128	Turf

Statistics (2015)
- Aircraft operations: 3,300
- Based aircraft: 12
- Sources: Federal Aviation Administration unless noted otherwise

Rhome Meadows Airport (FAA LID: T76) is a privately owned public airport in Rhome, Wise County, Texas, United States, located approximately 6 nautical miles (11 km) north of the central business district. The airport has no IATA or ICAO designation.

The airport is used solely for general aviation purposes.

== Facilities ==
Rhome Meadows Airport covers 238 acres (96 ha) at an elevation of 900 feet (270 m) above mean sea level (AMSL), and has one runway:

- Runway 13/31: 3,700 x 60 ft. (1,128 x 18 m), Surface: Turf

For the 12-month period ending 31 December 2015 the airport had 3,300 aircraft operations, an average of 9 per day: 100% general aviation. At that time there were 12 aircraft based at this airport: 92% single-engine and 8% ultralights, with no multi-engine, jets, helicopters, nor gliders.

== See also ==
- List of airports in Texas
