= Wilbarger County Airport =

Airport in Texas

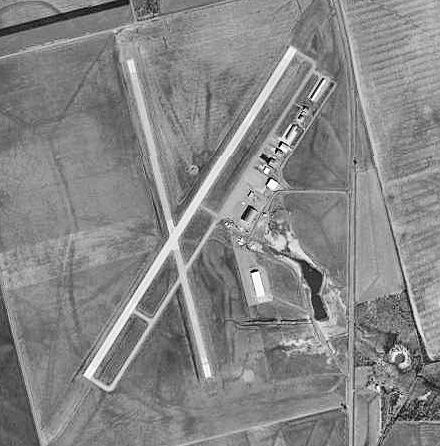
- USGS 1994 orthophoto
- IATA: WIB; ICAO: none; FAA LID: F05

Summary
- Airport type: Public
- Owner: Wilbarger County
- Serves: Vernon, Texas
- Elevation AMSL: 1,265 ft / 386 m
- Coordinates: 34°13′32″N 99°17′02″W

Map
- Location of airport in Texas

Runways
Direction	Length		Surface
Direction	ft	m	Surface
2/20	5,099	1,554	Asphalt
16/34	4,304	1,312	Asphalt

Statistics (2021)
- Aircraft operations (year ending 8/30/2021): 8,950
- Based aircraft: 19
- Source: Federal Aviation Administration

Wilbarger County Airport (IATA: WIB, FAA LID: F05) is a county-owned, public-use airport in Wilbarger County, Texas, United States. It is located four nautical miles (5 mi, 7 km) north of the central business district of Vernon, Texas. This airport is included in the National Plan of Integrated Airport Systems for 2011–2015, which categorized it as a general aviation facility.

== History ==
Activated on September 23, 1942, as Vernon Airport. Conducted basic AAF flying training until inactivated March 31, 1945. Primary use was basic flying training of military flight cadets. Flying training was performed with Fairchild PT-19s as the primary trainer. Also had several PT-17 Stearmans and a few P-40 Warhawks assigned. Also was an auxiliary to Frederick Army Airfield, Oklahoma.

Transferred to Army Corps of Engineers on May 5, 1945. The airfield was turned over to civil control in February 1947 though the War Assets Administration.

At some point a large hangar was relocated from the nearby Victory Field onto the airport. It served the dual purpose of transient hangar and Terminal until 1974 when a new terminal building was constructed. The hangar is still used for transient aircraft storage.

== Facilities and aircraft ==
Wilbarger County Airport covers an area of 600 acres (243 ha) at an elevation of 1,265 feet (386 m) above mean sea level. It has two asphalt paved runways: 2/20 is 5,099 by 100 feet (1,554 x 30 m) and 16/34 is 4,304 by 80 feet (1,312 x 24 m).

For the 12-month period ending August 30, 2021, the airport had 8,950 aircraft operations, an average of 25 per day: 99% general aviation and 1% military. At that time there were 19 aircraft based at this airport: 17 single-engine, 1 multi-engine, and 1 helicopter.

== See also ==
- Texas World War II Army Airfields
- List of airports in Texas
