= Hunt Airport =

Airport in San Patricio County, Texas

- IATA: none; ICAO: none; FAA LID: 9R5

Summary
- Airport type: Public use
- Owner: W. E. Hunt Estate
- Serves: Portland, Texas
- Elevation AMSL: 40 ft (12 m)
- Coordinates: 27°53′13″N 097°20′54″W

Map
- Location of airport in Texas

Runways
Direction	Length		Surface
Direction	ft	m	Surface
14L/32R	2,650	808	Asphalt

Statistics (2011)
- Aircraft operations: 2,100
- Based aircraft: 7
- Source: Federal Aviation Administration

Hunt Airport (FAA LID: 9R5) is a privately owned, public use airport in San Patricio County, Texas, United States. It is located two nautical miles (4 km) northwest of the central business district of Portland, Texas.

== Facilities and aircraft ==
Hunt Airport covers an area of 168 acres (68 ha) at an elevation of 40 feet (12 m) above mean sea level. It has one active runway designated 14L/32R which measures 2,650 by 20 feet (808 x 6 m) with an asphalt surface. A turf and gravel runway designated 14R/32L and measuring 1,400 by 60 feet (427 x 18 m) is closed indefinitely.

For the 12-month period ending March 4, 2011, the airport had 2,100 general aviation aircraft operations, an average of 175 per month. At that time there were seven single-engine aircraft based at this airport.

== See also ==
- List of airports in Texas
