= Jackson County Airport (Texas) =

- IATA: none; ICAO: none; FAA LID: 26R

Summary
- Airport type: Public
- Owner: Jackson County
- Serves: Edna, Texas
- Elevation AMSL: 61 ft (19 m)
- Coordinates: 29°00′04″N 096°34′55″W

Map
- Location within Texas

Runways
Direction	Length		Surface
Direction	ft	m	Surface
15/33	3,393	1,034	Asphalt

Statistics (2008)
- Aircraft operations: 7,620
- Based aircraft: 22
- Source: Federal Aviation Administration

Jackson County Airport (FAA LID: 26R) is a county-owned, public-use airport located three nautical miles (6 km) northeast of the central business district of Edna, in Jackson County, Texas, United States.

== Facilities and aircraft ==
Jackson County Airport covers an area of 108 acres (44 ha) at an elevation of 61 feet (19 m) above mean sea level. It has one runway designated 15/33 with an asphalt surface measuring 3,393 by 70 feet (1,034 x 21 m).

For the 12-month period ending May 26, 2008, the airport had 7,620 aircraft operations, an average of 20 per day: 98% general aviation and 2% military. At that time there were 22 aircraft based at this airport: 95.5% single-engine and 4.5% multi-engine.

== See also ==
- List of airports in Texas
