= Stephenville Clark Regional Airport =

Airport near Stephenville, Texas

- IATA: SEP; ICAO: KSEP; FAA LID: SEP

Summary
- Airport type: Public
- Owner: City of Stephenville
- Serves: Stephenville, Texas
- Location: 1050 Airport Rd, Stephenville, TX 76401
- Elevation AMSL: 1,321 ft / 953 m
- Coordinates: 32°12′55″N 098°10′39″W
- Website: https://www.stephenvilletx.gov/community/page/stephenville-clark-regional-airport

Map

Runways
Direction	Length		Surface
Direction	ft	m	Surface
14/32	4,209	1,283	Asphalt

Stephenville Clark Regional Airport is a general aviation airport in Stephenville, Texas.

== Facilities ==
Stephenville airport has one asphalt runway (14-32) which is 4,209 ft. (1,283 m) long and 75 ft. (23 m) wide. and sits at an elevation of 1,321 ft. (402 m) above mean sea level. The airport had 13,270 aircraft operations in one year. There are twenty-five aircraft based on the airfield and has a development estimate of $3,600,000. There are two FAA approved instrument approaches to the airport. One is an Area Navigation (RNAV) GPS approach to runway 14 and another RNAV approach to runway 32.

== See also ==
List of airports in Texas
