= La Porte Municipal Airport (Texas) =

Coordinates: 29°40′09″N 095°03′51″W

- IATA: none; ICAO: none; FAA LID: T41

Summary
- Airport type: Public
- Owner: City of La Porte
- Serves: La Porte, Texas
- Elevation AMSL: 25 ft (7.6 m)

Map
- Location of airport in Texas T41 (the United States)

Runways
Direction	Length		Surface
Direction	ft	m	Surface
12/30	4,165	1,269	Asphalt
5/23	2,998	914	Asphalt

Statistics (2023)
- Aircraft operations (year ending 4/5/2023): 29,050
- Based aircraft: 40
- Source: Federal Aviation Administration

La Porte Municipal Airport (FAA LID: T41) is a city-owned public-use airport located three miles (5 km) northwest of the central business district of La Porte, a city in Harris County, Texas, United States.

== Facilities and aircraft ==
La Porte Municipal Airport covers an area of 300 acres (120 ha) which contains two asphalt paved runways: 12/30 measuring 4,165 x 75 ft (1,269 x 23 m) and 5/23 measuring 2,998 x 75 ft (914 x 23 m).

For the 12-month period ending April 5, 2023, the airport had 29,050 general aviation aircraft operations, an average of 80 per day. At that time there were 40 aircraft based at the airport: 36 single-engine, and 4 multi-engine.

== Accidents and incidents ==
- On July 15, 2018, two people were killed when a homebuilt Kolb Twinstar III crashed into a pipeline easement 300 yards from the end of the runway.

== See also ==
- List of airports in Texas
