= McKinley Field =

Coordinates: 28°49′20″N 099°06′32″W

- IATA: none; ICAO: none; FAA LID: T30

Summary
- Airport type: Private Open to public
- Owner: Aerial LLC
- Operator: McKinley Aerial Service
- Serves: Pearsall, Texas
- Elevation AMSL: 586 ft / 179 m

Map

Runways
Direction	Length		Surface
Direction	ft	m	Surface
13/31	5,027	1,532	Asphalt

Statistics (2005)
- Aircraft operations: 3,900
- Source: Federal Aviation Administration

McKinley Field (FAA LID: T30) is a privately owned, public-use airport located four miles (6 km) south of the central business district of Pearsall, in Frio County, Texas, United States. It is privately owned by Aerial LLC, and is managed by Ike and Nathan McKinley.

== Facilities and aircraft ==
McKinley Field covers an area of 141 acres (57 ha) which contains one asphalt paved runway (13/31) measuring 5,027 x 60 ft (1,532 x 18 m). For the 12-month period ending March 18, 2005, the airport had 3,900 aircraft operations, 100% of which were general aviation.

== See also ==
- List of airports in Texas
