= Skyway Manor Airport =

- IATA: none; ICAO: none; FAA LID: T79

Summary
- Airport type: Public
- Owner: Skyway Manor
- Serves: Pearland, Texas
- Elevation AMSL: 55 ft / 17 m
- Coordinates: 29°33′21″N 095°19′41″W

Map

Runways
Direction	Length		Surface
Direction	ft	m	Surface
17/35	2,550	777	Turf

Statistics (2006)
- Aircraft operations: 2,400
- Source: Federal Aviation Administration

Skyway Manor Airport (FAA LID: T79) is a public-use airport located three nautical miles (6 km) west of the central business district of Pearland and in Brazoria County, Texas, United States. The airport is privately owned by Skyway Manor.

== Facilities and aircraft ==
Skyway Manor Airport covers an area of 24 acres (9.7 ha) at an elevation of 55 feet (17 m) above mean sea level. It has one runway designated 17/35 with a turf surface measuring 2,550 by 70 feet (777 x 21 m). For the 12-month period ending November 22, 2006, the airport had 2,400 aircraft operations, an average of 200 per month, all of which were general aviation. There are no commercial flights.

== See also ==
- List of airports in Texas
