= Kittyhawk Airport =

Former airport in Allen, Texas, United States

Kittyhawk Airport (closed)
- IATA: none; ICAO: none; FAA LID: 0T7

Summary
- Airport type: Public
- Owner: Kittyhawk Estates Assn.
- Serves: Allen, Texas
- Elevation AMSL: 700 ft / 213 m
- Coordinates: 33°07′34″N 096°41′01″W

Map

Runways
Direction	Length		Surface
Direction	ft	m	Surface
18/36	2,300	701	Turf

Statistics (2008)
- Aircraft operations: 3,300
- Based aircraft: 11
- Source: Federal Aviation Administration

Kittyhawk Airport (FAA LID: 0T7) was a privately owned public-use airport located one nautical mile (2 km) northwest of the central business district of Allen, a city in Collin County, Texas, United States.

== Facilities and aircraft ==
Kittyhawk Airport covered an area of 66 acres (27 ha) at an elevation of 700 feet (213 m) above mean sea level. It had one runway designated 18/36 with a turf surface measuring 2,300 by 195 feet (701 x 59 m).

For the 12-month period ending August 29, 2008, the airport had 3,300 general aviation aircraft operations, an average of 275 per month. At that time there were 11 aircraft based at this airport: 91% single-engine and 9% multi-engine.

== Redevelopment ==
In 2012, it was announced that Kittyhawk Airport would be redeveloped into a single family home community with homes built by Pulte Homes and Grand Homes. The 66-acre tract of land was purchased by JBLG Capital LP of Dallas after 7 of the 10 property owners agreed to sell. In addition, 3.5-acres of land was purchased from Allen Independent School District. The name of the community would be known as the "Landings at Kittyhawk" or simply "The Landings".
