= Baytown Airport =

- IATA: HPY; ICAO: KHPY; FAA LID: HPY

Summary
- Airport type: Public
- Owner: Raceco Inc.
- Serves: Baytown, Texas
- Elevation AMSL: 34 ft (10 m)
- Coordinates: 29°47′10″N 094°57′10″W

Map
- Location within Texas

Runways
Direction	Length		Surface
Direction	ft	m	Surface
14/32	4,334	1,321	Asphalt

Statistics (2004)
- Aircraft operations: 11,700
- Based aircraft: 39
- Source: Federal Aviation Administration

Baytown Airport (IATA: HPY, ICAO: KHPY, FAA LID: HPY) is a public-use airport in unincorporated Harris County, Texas, United States, located 3 nautical miles (5.6 km; 3.5 mi) north of the central business district of Baytown. It is privately owned by Raceco Inc.

== History ==
There was a previous Baytown Airport that closed in 1986; it opened in 1944 as Humphrey Airport. Circa 1977 the City of Baytown was considering buying Humphrey Airport.

== Facilities and aircraft ==
Baytown Airport covers an area of 125 acres (51 ha) which contains one runway designated 14/32 with a 4,334 x 60 ft (1,321 x 18.288 m) asphalt surface. For the 12-month period ending October 2009, the airport had 9,490 general aviation aircraft operations, an average of 27 per day. At that time there were 27 aircraft based at the airport, including one jet and two helicopters.

In 2009 Memorial Hermann Life Flight opened their new East Base on the airport property with one helicopter and crew accommodations.

== See also ==
- List of airports in Texas
