= Hillsboro Municipal Airport (Texas) =

- IATA: none; ICAO: KINJ; FAA LID: INJ

Summary
- Airport type: Public
- Owner/Operator: City of Hillsboro
- Serves: Hillsboro, Texas
- Elevation AMSL: 686 ft (209 m)
- Coordinates: 32°05′01″N 097°05′50″W
- Website: HillsboroTX.org/...

Map
- Location within Texas

Runways
Direction	Length		Surface
Direction	ft	m	Surface
16/34	3,998	1,219	Asphalt

Statistics (2008)
- Aircraft operations: 6,000
- Source: Federal Aviation Administration

Hillsboro Municipal Airport (ICAO: KINJ, FAA LID: INJ) is six miles north of City of Hillsboro, in Hill County, Texas.

Most U.S. airports use the same three-letter location identifier for the FAA and IATA, but this airport is INJ to the FAA and has no IATA code. (IATA says INJ is Injune, Queensland, Australia).

== Facilities ==
Hillsboro Municipal Airport covers 130 acres (53 ha) at an elevation of 686 feet (209 m). It has one asphalt runway, 16/34, 3,998 by 60 feet (1,219 x 18 m). In the year ending August 7, 2008 the airport had 6,000 general aviation aircraft operations, average 16 per day.

== See also ==
- List of airports in Texas
