= Garland/DFW Heloplex =

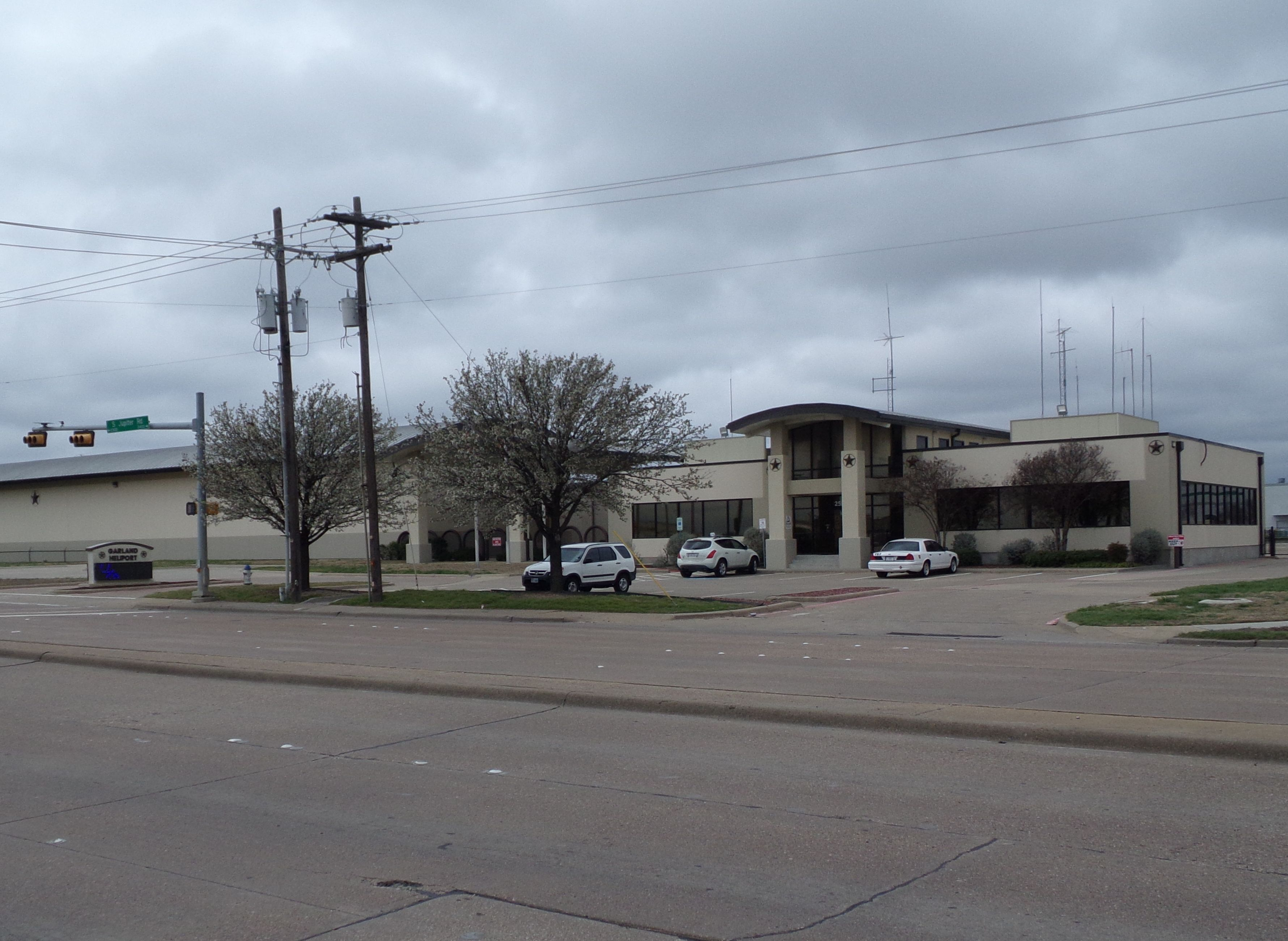
- Garland/DFW Heloplex, otherwise known as Garland Heliport, 2559 S. Jupiter Road, Garland, TX 75041.
- IATA: none; ICAO: none; FAA LID: T57

Summary
- Airport type: Public
- Owner: City of Garland
- Operator: SKY Helicopters Inc.
- Serves: Garland, Texas
- Location: 2559 S. Jupiter Road, Garland, TX 75041
- Elevation AMSL: 601 ft (183 m)
- Coordinates: 32°53′16″N 096°41′1″W
- Website: http://www.skyhelicopters.com

Map
- Location within Texas

Helipads
Number	Length		Surface
Number	ft	m	Surface
H1	105	32	Concrete

Statistics (2012)
- Aircraft operations: 36,500
- Based aircraft: 15
- Source: Federal Aviation Administration

Garland/DFW Heloplex (FAA LID: T57) is a city-owned public heliport in Garland, in Dallas County, Texas, United States, located approximately 2 nautical miles (3.7 km) southwest of the central business district. The facility is used for general aviation and air taxi purposes and is operated by SKY Helicopters. The heliport has no IATA or ICAO designation. The facility is alternately known as the Garland/DFW Heliport, Garland Heliport, or Garland/DFW Heliplex. (Note: The SKY Helicopters website uses both the alternate “Heliplex” spelling and the Garland/DFW Heliport name; the latter name has been used in press articles and is given as an alternate name by the Texas Department of Transportation. As of early 2015, the sign on Jupiter Road read "Garland Heliport".)

== History ==
In development since 1985, the facility opened in November 1989, becoming the first municipal heliport in Texas. The project cost about US$2.5 million, with the majority being provided by two Federal Aviation Administration (FAA) grants totaling nearly US$2 million, and the remainder provided by the city of Garland.

Despite initial optimism, anticipated shuttle service to Dallas/Fort Worth International Airport and Dallas Love Field never materialized, and the Garland City Council voted on 12 August 1991 to shut down the facility, citing US$40,000 in annual operating expenditures, a lack of future expansion space, and the failure of the heliport's original operator, Garland/DFW Heliplex Corp., to follow through on promises to improve the facility. However, despite a second closure vote on 21 January 1992 and negotiations with an industrial property developer to sell the site, the heliport was ultimately kept open to avert the likelihood that the city would have to repay the initial US$1.5 million FAA construction grant. While negotiations with the FAA and the potential buyer were being conducted, the facility was leased to its second operator, Heli-Tex Inc.

On 5 October 1992, a plan was announced to keep the heliport open by leasing it to an independent operator on a long-term self-sustaining basis. On 5 January 1993, the City Council approved a five-year US$6,000 annual lease arrangement with Carrollton-based SKY Helicopters Inc., which promised to build a new hangar, promote the property, and provide helicopter services, while the city would receive a percentage of the proceeds from fuel sales and set the money aside in a special fund for major repairs.

On 14 June 1999, the City Council voted to grant SKY Helicopters a 40-year lease of the facility, and the company agreed to make US$2 million to $3 million in improvements, including an expansion of hangar space from 4,000 to 20,000 sq ft (371.6 to 1,858.1 m^{2}), and the replacement of the existing 3,000 sq ft (278.7 m^{2}) prefabricated metal terminal with a more permanent 13,000 sq ft (1,207.7 m^{2}) structure.

== Facilities and aircraft ==
Garland/DFW Heloplex covers 8 acres (3.2 ha) at an elevation of 601 feet (183 m) above mean sea level. Its one helipad, H1, is 105 by 105 feet (32 × 32 m) concrete.

In the year ending 31 December 2012 the heliport had 36,400 general aviation and 100 air taxi operations, average 100 total per day. 15 helicopters were then based at this heliport.

== Accidents and incidents ==
- 24 February 1996: During a rearward hover demonstration at an altitude less than 5 ft (1.5 m), the tail rotor of a Robinson R22, registration number N8141L, struck the ground; directional control was lost and the aircraft began to rotate right and roll left. The left skid contacted the ground and the helicopter rolled inverted, causing substantial damage. The pilot and passenger suffered minor or no injuries. The accident was attributed to the pilot's failure to maintain adequate altitude during the maneuver.

== See also ==
- List of airports in Texas
