= Boyd Field (Texas) =

- IATA: none; ICAO: none; FAA LID: 54X

Summary
- Airport type: Public
- Owner: William G. Boyd
- Serves: Waco, Texas
- Elevation AMSL: 570 ft (170 m)
- Coordinates: 31°34′31″N 097°18′04″W

Map
- Location of airport in Texas

Runways
Direction	Length		Surface
Direction	ft	m	Surface
3/21	1,950	594	Turf
5/23	1,950	594	Turf
- Source: Federal Aviation Administration

Boyd Field (FAA LID: 54X) is a privately owned, public use airport located eight nautical miles (15 km) west of the central business district of Waco, in McLennan County, Texas, United States.

== Facilities ==
Boyd Field covers an area of 33 acres (13 ha) at an elevation of 570 feet (174 m) above mean sea level. It has two runways, designated 3/21 and 5/23, each with a turf surface measuring 1,950 by 60 feet (594 x 18 m).
