= Naval Outlying Field Goliad =

- IATA: none; ICAO: KNGT; FAA LID: NGT

Summary
- Airport type: Military
- Owner: US Navy
- Location: Berclair, Texas
- Elevation AMSL: 324 ft (99 m)
- Coordinates: 28°36′42″N 097°36′45″W

Map
- Location within Texas

Runways
| Direction | Length | | Surface |
| Direction | ft | m | Surface |
|---|---|---|---|
| 11/29 | 8,000 | 2,438 | Asphalt/Concrete |
| 17/35 | 8,000 | 2,438 | Asphalt |

Naval Outlying Field Goliad (ICAO: KNGT, FAA LID: NGT) is a military airport located five nautical miles (6 mi, 9 km) north of the central business district of Berclair, Texas, in Goliad County. It is owned by the United States Navy. The airfield has two runways, both 8000 feet long by 150 feet wide. Its mission is to support operations of the Naval Air Training Command, specifically Commander, Training Air Wing FOUR located aboard Naval Air Station Corpus Christi. It is under the control of Commander, Navy Region Southeast.

== History ==
Goliad NOLF was originally built by the United States Navy in the 1970s as Chase Naval Air Station Auxiliary Landing Field Berclair and served as an auxiliary airfield for flight training operations at Naval Air Station Chase Field near Beeville, Texas. The airfield was closed as a result of the 1993 Base Realignment and Closure Commission that also resulted in the closing of NAS Chase Field. Goliad County purchased the airfield from the U.S. Navy for $1 in 1999 as surplus property and redeveloped the property as Goliad County Industrial Airpark (FAA LID: 7T3), which was a county-owned, public-use airport. The airport was included in the National Plan of Integrated Airport Systems for 2011–2015, which categorized it as a general aviation facility. The United States Navy repurchased the field from Goliad County in 2011 for $2.3 million (equivalent to $3.3 million in 2025).

== Facilities ==
NOLF Goliad covers an area of 1,136 acres (460 ha) at an elevation of 324 feet (99 m) above mean sea level. It has two runways: 11/29 is 8,000 by 150 feet (2,438 x 46 m) with an asphalt and concrete surface; 17/35 is 8,000 by 150 feet (2,438 x 46 m) with an asphalt surface.
