= Franklin County Airport (Texas) =

- IATA: none; ICAO: none; FAA LID: F53

Summary
- Airport type: Public
- Owner: Franklin County
- Location: Mount Vernon, Texas
- Elevation AMSL: 411 ft (125 m)
- Coordinates: 33°12′56″N 095°14′15″W

Map
- Location within Texas

Runways
Direction	Length		Surface
Direction	ft	m	Surface
13/31	3,900	1,189	Asphalt

Statistics (2003)
- Aircraft operations: 5,700
- Source: Federal Aviation Administration

Franklin County Airport (FAA LID: F53) is two miles northwest of Mount Vernon, in Franklin County, Texas, USA.

== Facilities ==
Franklin County Airport covers 159 acres (64 ha); its asphalt runway, 13/31, is 3,900 x 60 ft (1,189 x 18 m). In the year ending December 17, 2003 the airport had 5,700 aircraft operations, all general aviation.

== See also ==
- List of airports in Texas
