= Houston Fort Bend Airport =

- IATA: none; ICAO: none; FAA LID: 2H5

Summary
- Airport type: Public use
- Owner: John D. Hull, Jr. & Mary Hull
- Serves: Houston, Texas
- Location: Beasley, Texas
- Elevation AMSL: 105 ft (32 m)
- Coordinates: 29°30′18″N 095°54′00″W

Map
- Location within Texas

Runways
Direction	Length		Surface
Direction	ft	m	Surface
17/35	4,400	1,341	Turf
- Source: Federal Aviation Administration

Houston Fort Bend Airport (FAA LID: 2H5) is a privately owned, public use airport located in unincorporated Fort Bend County, Texas, United States. The airport is located east of Beasley and 33 nautical miles (61 km) southwest of the central business district of Houston. It was formerly known as Happy Landings Airport.

== Facilities ==
Houston Fort Bend Airport covers an area of 350 acres (140 ha) at an elevation of 105 feet (32 m) above mean sea level. It has one runway designated 17/35 with a turf surface measuring 4,400 by 100 feet (1,341 by 30 m).

== See also ==
- List of airports in Texas
