= Rankin Airport (Texas) =

- IATA: none; ICAO: none; FAA LID: 49F

Summary
- Airport type: Public
- Owner: Upton County
- Serves: Rankin, Texas
- Elevation AMSL: 2,543 ft / 775 m
- Coordinates: 31°13′39″N 101°57′11″W

Map

Runways
Direction	Length		Surface
Direction	ft	m	Surface
17/35	3,000	914	Gravel

Statistics (2007)
- Aircraft operations: 700
- Source: Federal Aviation Administration

Rankin Airport (FAA LID: 49F) is a county-owned, public-use airport located one mile (2 km) west of the central business district of Rankin, a city in Upton County, Texas, United States.

== Facilities and aircraft ==
Rankin Airport covers an area of 7 acres (2.8 ha) and has one runway designated 17/35 with a 3,000 x 35 ft (914 x 11 m) gravel surface. For the 12-month period ending April 21, 2007, the airport had 700 general aviation aircraft operations, an average of 58 per month.

== See also ==
- List of airports in Texas
