= Rusk County Airport (Texas) =

Airport in Texas, United States

- IATA: none; ICAO: KRFI; FAA LID: RFI

Summary
- Airport type: Public
- Owner: Rusk County
- Serves: Henderson, Texas
- Elevation AMSL: 442 ft / 135 m
- Coordinates: 32°08′30″N 094°51′06″W
- Website: RuskCountyAirport.com

Map

Runways
Direction	Length		Surface
Direction	ft	m	Surface
17/35	4,006	1,221	Asphalt
12/30	3,002	915	Asphalt

Statistics (2019)
- Aircraft operations (year ending 3/27/2019): 12,400
- Based aircraft: 41
- Source: Federal Aviation Administration

Rusk County Airport (ICAO: KRFI, FAA LID: RFI, formerly F12) is a county-owned, public-use airport in Rusk County, Texas, United States. It is located three nautical miles (6 km) west of the central business district of Henderson, Texas. The current airport manager is Alexa McAnally, since 2020.

Although many U.S. airports use the same three-letter location identifier for the FAA and IATA, this facility is assigned RFI by the FAA but has no designation from the IATA.

== Facilities and aircraft ==
Rusk County Airport covers an area of 521 acres (211 ha) at an elevation of 442 feet (135 m) above mean sea level. It has two asphalt paved runways: 17/35 is 4,006 by 75 feet (1,221 x 23 m) and 12/30 is 3,002 by 75 feet (915 x 23 m).

For the 12-month period ending March 27, 2019, the airport had 12,400 aircraft operations, an average of 34 per day: 97% general aviation and 3% military. At that time there were 41 aircraft based at this airport: all single-engine.

== See also ==
- List of airports in Texas
