= Horizon Airport (San Antonio) =

- IATA: none; ICAO: none; FAA LID: 74R

Summary
- Airport type: Public
- Owner: Toudouze Investments, Inc.
- Location: San Antonio, Texas
- Opened: April 1945
- Elevation AMSL: 550 ft (170 m)
- Coordinates: 29°17′01″N 098°30′01″W

Map
- Location within Texas

Runways
Direction	Length		Surface
Direction	ft	m	Surface
11/29	2,360	719	Turf
16/34	2,250	686	Turf

Statistics (2004)
- Aircraft operations: 0
- Source: Federal Aviation Administration

Horizon Airport (FAA LID: 74R) is a public-use airport located nine miles (14 km) south of the central business district of San Antonio, in Bexar County, Texas, United States. It is privately owned by Toudouze Investments, Inc.

== History ==
The facility opened as Lake Airport in 1945 as a commercial/municipal airport. It was renamed Lakefield Airport by 1953 and had two runways. It was given its current name Horizon Airport by 1967. The airport went for sale in 2020.

== Facilities and aircraft ==
Horizon Airport covers an area of 60 acres (24 ha) adjacent to Mitchell Lake and contains two runways:

- Runway 11/29: 2,360 x 80 ft (719 x 24 m), Surface: Turf
- Runway 16/34: 2,250 x 100 ft (686 x 30 m), Surface: Turf

For the 12-month period ending January 28, 2004, the airport had 2,800 aircraft operations, 100% of which were general aviation. As of the 12-month period ending May 9, 2020, there have been zero operations at the airport.

== See also ==
- List of airports in Texas
