= Lancaster Regional Airport =

Airport in Texas, United States of America

- IATA: none; ICAO: KLNC; FAA LID: LNC

Summary
- Airport type: Public
- Owner: City of Lancaster
- Serves: Lancaster, Texas
- Elevation AMSL: 501 ft / 153 m
- Coordinates: 32°34′39″N 096°43′03″W
- Website: LancasterRegionalAirport.com

Map

Runways
Direction	Length		Surface
Direction	ft	m	Surface
13/31	6,500	1,981	Asphalt

Statistics (2023)
- Aircraft operations (year ending 11/3/2023): 67,100
- Based aircraft: 68
- Source: Federal Aviation Administration

Lancaster Regional Airport (ICAO: KLNC, FAA LID: LNC) is two miles south of Lancaster, in Dallas County, Texas. Formerly Lancaster Airport, the National Plan of Integrated Airport Systems for 2011–2015 categorized it as a general aviation reliever airport.

Most U.S. airports use the same three-letter location identifier for the FAA and IATA, but this airport is LNC to the FAA and has no IATA code. (IATA assigned LNC to Lengbati Airport in Lengbati, Papua New Guinea).

== Facilities ==
The airport covers 548 acres (222 ha) at an elevation of 501 feet (153 m). Its single runway, 13/31, is 6,500 by 100 feet (1,981 x 30 m) asphalt.

In the year ending November 3, 2023, the airport had 67,100 aircraft operations, average 184 per day: 100% general aviation and <1% military. 68 aircraft were then based at this airport: 52 single-engine, 10 multi-engine, 1 jet, 4 helicopter, and 1 glider.

== See also ==
- List of airports in Texas
