= Tradewind Airport =

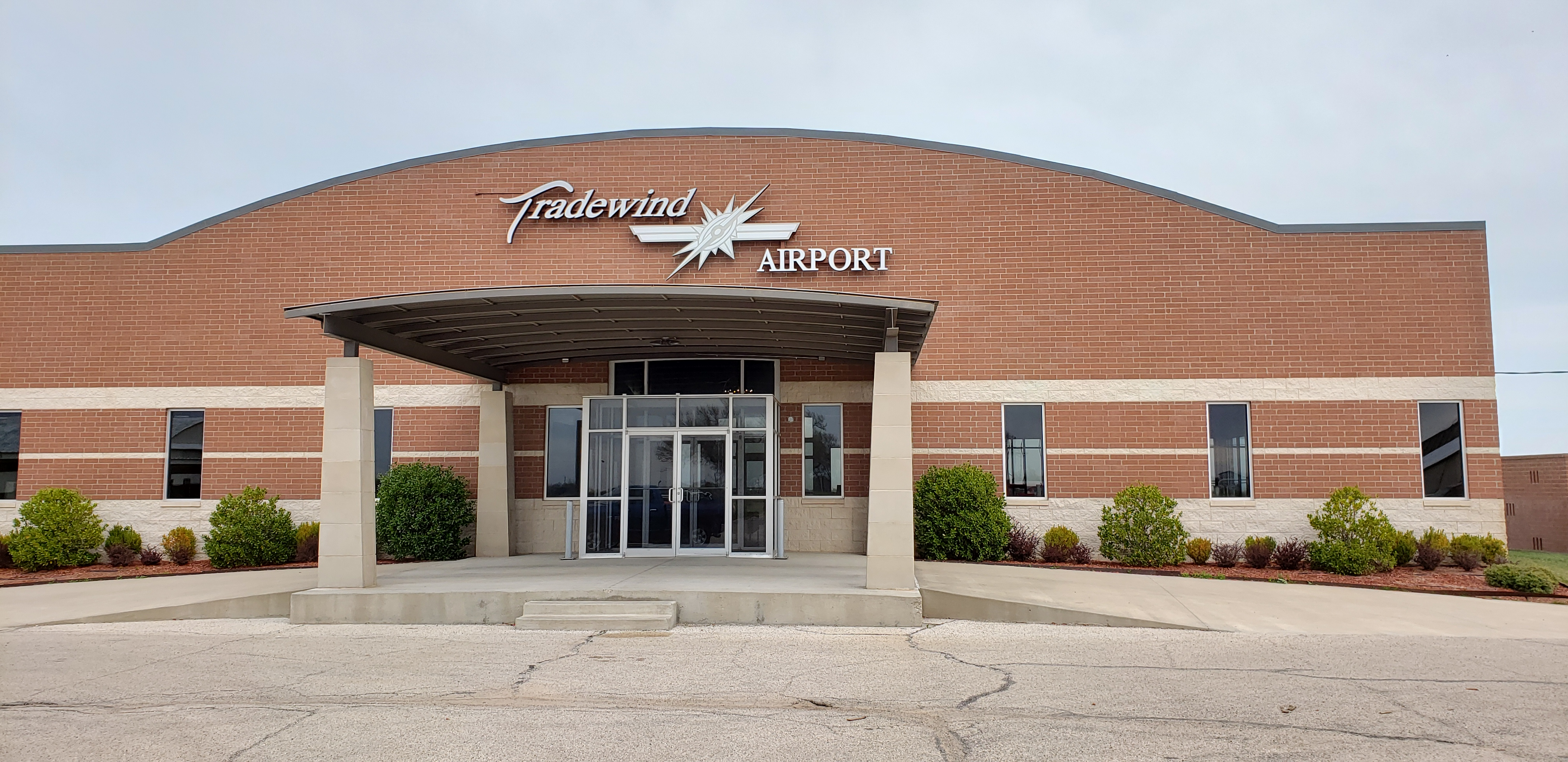
- IATA: TDW; ICAO: KTDW; FAA LID: TDW

Summary
- Airport type: Public
- Owner: Tradewind LLC
- Serves: Amarillo, Texas
- Elevation AMSL: 3,649 ft / 1,112 m
- Coordinates: 35°10′12″N 101°49′33″W

Map

Runways
Direction	Length		Surface
Direction	ft	m	Surface
17/35	5,098	1,554	Asphalt
5/23	3,000	914	Asphalt

Helipads
Number	Length		Surface
Number	ft	m	Surface
H1	50	15	Asphalt

Statistics (2009)
- Aircraft operations: 32,790
- Based aircraft: 95
- Source: Federal Aviation Administration

Tradewind Airport (IATA: TDW, ICAO: KTDW, FAA LID: TDW) is a privately owned public use airport in Randall County, Texas, United States. It is located three nautical miles (3.5 mi, 5.6 km) southeast of the central business district of Amarillo, Texas. Established in 1946 by Shelby Kritser, Tradewind airport has been a hub for general aviation in Amarillo. Shelby Kritser died in 1966 in an aircraft accident. After his death the airport was sold to Jimmy Whittenburg who owned and operated the airport until 2001, who then sold the airport to Perry Williams who owns and operates the airport today. The FBo building was built in 2014, many maintenance facilities and private air carriers. The Shelby's Restaurant on the field was opened in 2022 in tribute to Shelby Kritser.

== Facilities and aircraft ==
Tradewind Airport covers an area of 595 acres (241 ha) at an elevation of 3,649 feet (1,112 m) above mean sea level. It has two asphalt paved runways: 17/35 is 5,098 by 60 feet (1,554 x 18 m) and 5/23 is 3,000 by 60 feet (914 x 18 m). It also has one helipad with a 50 by 50 feet (15 x 15 m) asphalt surface.

For the 12-month period ending June 22, 2009, the airport had 32,790 aircraft operations, an average of 89 per day: 99.9% general aviation and 0.1% military. At that time there were 95 aircraft based at this airport: 84% single-engine, 13% multi-engine, 2% jet and 1% helicopter.

== See also ==
- List of airports in Texas
- Rick Husband Amarillo International Airport
