= Mason County Airport (Texas) =

- IATA: none; ICAO: none; FAA LID: T92

Summary
- Airport type: Public
- Owner: Mason County
- Serves: Mason, Texas
- Elevation AMSL: 1,502 ft / 458 m
- Coordinates: 30°43′56″N 099°11′02″W

Map
- Location of airport in Texas

Runways
Direction	Length		Surface
Direction	ft	m	Surface
17/35	3,716	1,133	Asphalt
13/31	3,000	914	Turf

Statistics (2012)
- Aircraft operations: 1,800
- Based aircraft: 6
- Source: Federal Aviation Administration

Mason County Airport (FAA LID: T92) is a county-owned, public-use airport in Mason County, Texas, United States. It is located three nautical miles (6 km) southeast of the central business district of Mason, Texas.

== Facilities and aircraft ==
Mason County Airport covers an area of 232 acres (94 ha) at an elevation of 1,502 feet (458 m) above mean sea level. It has two runways: 17/35 is 3,716 by 50 feet (1,133 x 15 m) with an asphalt surface and 13/31 is 3,000 by 60 feet (914 x 18 m) with a turf surface.

For the 12-month period ending January 21, 2012, the airport had 1,800 general aviation aircraft operations, an average of 150 per month. At that time there were six single-engine aircraft based at this airport.

== See also ==
- List of airports in Texas
