= Horizon Airport (El Paso, Texas) =

- IATA: none; ICAO: none; FAA LID: T27

Summary
- Airport type: Public
- Owner: Family of Phil Barrett
- Location: El Paso, Texas
- Elevation AMSL: 4,007 ft (1,221 m)
- Coordinates: 31°43′11″N 106°14′13″W

Map
- Location within Texas

Runways
Direction	Length		Surface
Direction	ft	m	Surface
8/26	6,885	2,099	Asphalt/Dirt

Statistics (2007)
- Aircraft operations: 31,200
- Based aircraft: 90
- Source: Federal Aviation Administration

Horizon Airport (FAA LID: T27), formerly West Texas Airport, was a public-use airport in El Paso, Texas, located 11 miles (18 km) southeast of the central business district on Pellicano Drive about 1.5 miles east of Joe Battle Boulevard (Texas Loop 375). It was privately owned by the family of the late Phil Barrett.

== Facilities and aircraft ==
Horizon Airport covered an area of 200 acres (81 ha) which contained one runway:

- Runway 8/26: 6,885 x 50 ft (2,099 x 15 m), Surface: 6,885 ft Asphalt / 2,500 ft Dirt

For the 12-month period ending April 28, 2007, the airport had 31,200 aircraft operations, an average of 85 per day, 100% of which were general aviation. There were 90 aircraft based at this airport: 76% single engine, 2% multi-engine, 11% gliders and 11% ultralights.

Horizon Airport was home to the local soaring society for gliders. It previously hosted 1/4 mile drag racing events and featured a cement launch pad and paved staging area. The film Lone Wolf McQuade starring Chuck Norris was filmed at the airport in 1982.
