= Dan Jones International Airport =

- IATA: none; ICAO: none; FAA LID: T51

Summary
- Airport type: Public
- Owner: Daniel Jones
- Serves: Houston, Texas
- Location: Harris County, Texas
- Elevation AMSL: 166 ft (51 m)
- Coordinates: 30°02′34″N 095°40′02″W

Map
- Location within Texas

Runways
Direction	Length		Surface
Direction	ft	m	Surface
17/35	3,440	1,049	Asphalt/Turf

Statistics (2008)
- Aircraft operations: 7,800
- Based aircraft: 18
- Source: Federal Aviation Administration

Dan Jones International Airport (FAA LID: T51) is a public-use airport in unincorporated Harris County, Texas, United States that is privately owned by Daniel Jones of Cypress. The airport is located 5 nautical miles (9 km) southwest of the city of Tomball and 22 nautical miles (41 km) northwest of Downtown Houston.

== Facilities and aircraft ==
Dan Jones International Airport covers an area of 24 acres (9.7 ha) at an elevation of 166 feet (51 m) above mean sea level. It has one runway designated 17/35 with a 3,440 by 50 ft (1,049 x 15 m) asphalt and turf surface. For the 12-month period ending May 20, 2008, the airport had 7,800 aircraft operations, an average of 21 per day, all of which were general aviation. At that time there were 18 aircraft based at this airport: 94% single-engine and 6% multi-engine.

== See also ==
- List of airports in Texas
