= Hall-Miller Municipal Airport =

Municipal airport in Atlanta, Texas, United States

- IATA: none; ICAO: KATA; FAA LID: ATA

Summary
- Airport type: Public
- Owner: City of Atlanta
- Serves: Atlanta, Texas
- Location: 202 Airport Dr, Atlanta, TX 75551
- Elevation AMSL: 280.3 ft (85.4 m)
- Coordinates: 33°06′09″N 094°11′42″W

Map
- Location within Texas

Runways
Direction	Length		Surface
Direction	ft	m	Surface
05/23	3,800	1,158	Asphalt
15/33	2,264	690	Turf

Statistics (2016)
- Aircraft operations: 20,000
- Based aircraft: 39
- Sources: Federal Aviation Administration unless noted otherwise

Hall-Miller Municipal Airport (ICAO: KATA, FAA LID: ATA) is a city-owned public airport 2 nautical miles (3.7 km) southwest of the central business district of Atlanta, Cass County, Texas, United States. Most U.S. airports use the same three-letter location identifier for the FAA and IATA, but Hall-Miller Municipal Airport is assigned ATA by the FAA and has no IATA designation. IATA assigned ATA to Comandante FAP Germán Arias Graziani Airport in Anta, Ancash Region, Peru.

The airport is used solely for general aviation purposes.

== Facilities ==
Hall-Miller Municipal Airport covers 162 acres (66 ha) at an elevation of 280.3 feet (85.4 m) above mean sea level (AMSL), and has two runways:

- Runway 05/23: 3,800 x 60 ft. (1,158 x 18 m), Surface: Asphalt
- Runway 15/33: 2,264 x 75 ft. (690 x 23 m), Surface: Turf

The Texas Department of Transportation lists the length of Runway 15/33 as 2,463 ft (751 m).

For the year ending 9 June 2016, the airport had 20,000 aircraft operations, averaging 55 per day: 100% general aviation. 39 aircraft were then based at this airport: 95% single-engine, 3% multi-engine, and 3% ultralight.

== Accidents and incidents ==
- 19 January 1997: A Mahan Starduster II, (Note: Homebuilt aircraft with the builder's last name listed as the manufacturer; possibly a Stolp Starduster Too.) registration number N45227, was on approach when it lost engine power and the pilot performed a forced landing on a highway; the aircraft collided with a tree and came to rest in a pasture, suffering substantial damage, with the single passenger suffered serious injuries and the pilot suffered minor injuries. The pilot reported that he believed that the throttle fell back to the idle position due to a loose clamp; an FAA inspector "concluded that the power loss was due to failure of the engine throttle control cable." The accident was attributed to "improper maintenance by unknown person(s), which resulted in the failure of the throttle cable and a substantial loss of engine power. A factor relating to the accident was: the lack of suitable terrain for the forced landing."

== See also ==
- List of airports in Texas
