= Taylor Municipal Airport =

- IATA: none; ICAO: none; FAA LID: T74

Summary
- Airport type: Public
- Owner: City of Taylor
- Serves: Taylor, Texas
- Elevation AMSL: 600 ft (180 m)
- Coordinates: 30°34′22″N 097°26′36″W
- Website: www.TaylorMunicipalAirport.com

Map
- Location within Texas

Runways
Direction	Length		Surface
Direction	ft	m	Surface
17/35	4,000	1,219	Asphalt

Statistics (2016)
- Aircraft operations (year ending 12/29/2016): 12,000
- Based aircraft: 74
- Source: Federal Aviation Administration

Taylor Municipal Airport (FAA LID: T74) is a city-owned public-use airport located two nautical miles (4 km) west of the central business district of Taylor, a city in Williamson County, Texas, United States.

The airport is located on Highway 79 and it is an important component of economic development for the City of Taylor and the region. The Texas Department of Transportation Aviation Division has classified the airport as a general utility business service airport.

Airport fly-in events are scheduled several times a year and include aircraft from all over the region.

Lodging, food, and ground transportation at or near the airport include: Best Western Hotel, Mas Fajitas Restaurant and Bar, and Enterprise Car Rental.

== History ==
Originally a grass airstrip built in the 1930s, the runway was paved in the 1970s. The airport was acquired by the City of Taylor in 1998. In 2000, the runway was expanded from 3,000 to 4,000 feet.

== Facilities and aircraft ==
Taylor Municipal Airport covers an area of 106 acres (43 ha) at an elevation of 600 feet (183 m) above mean sea level. It has one runway designated 17/35 with a 4,000 by 75 ft (1,219 x 23 m) asphalt surface.

For the 12-month period ending December 29, 2016, the airport had 12,000 aircraft operations, an average of 33 per day, all of which were general aviation. At that time there were 74 aircraft based at this airport: 70 single-engine and 4 helicopter.

== See also ==
- List of airports in Texas
