= Liberty Municipal Airport =

- IATA: none; ICAO: none; FAA LID: T78

Summary
- Airport type: Public
- Owner: City of Liberty
- Serves: Liberty, Texas
- Elevation AMSL: 70 ft / 21 m
- Coordinates: 30°04′40″N 094°41′55″W
- Interactive map of Liberty Municipal Airport

Runways
Direction	Length		Surface
Direction	ft	m	Surface
16/34	3,801	1,159	Asphalt

Statistics (2007)
- Aircraft operations: 5,725
- Based aircraft: 12
- Source: Federal Aviation Administration

Liberty Municipal Airport (FAA LID: T78) is a public use airport in Liberty County, Texas, United States. It is owned by the City of Liberty and is located six nautical miles (11 km) northeast of its central business district.

== Facilities and aircraft ==
Liberty Municipal Airport covers an area of 127 acres (51 ha) at an elevation of 70 feet (21 m) above mean sea level. It has one runway designated 16/34 with an asphalt surface measuring 3,801 by 75 feet (1,159 x 23 m).

For the 12-month period ending September 20, 2007, the airport had 5,725 aircraft operations, an average of 15 per day: 99.6% general aviation and 0.4% military. At that time there were 14 aircraft based at this airport: 86% single-engine and 14% ultralight.

== See also ==
- List of airports in Texas
