= Prem =

Prem may refer to:

== People ==
=== Given name ===
- Prem Bhatia (disambiguation), several people
- Prem Singh Brahma (1952–2007), Indian Bodo separatist and politician
- Prem Singh Chandumajra (born 1950), Indian politician
- Prem Chopra (born 1935), actor in Hindi and Punjabi films
- Prem Chowdhry (born 1944), Indian social scientist, historian, and feminist
- Prem Singh Dhami, Nepalese politician and minister
- Prem Dhillon, Indian singer and songwriter
- Prem Dhawan, lyricist
- Prem Kumar Dhumal (born 1944), Indian politician
- Prem Nath Dogra (died 1972), Indian leader
- Prem Ram Dubey (1933–2012), Indian Kosal State separatist
- Prem Chand Gupta (born 1950), Indian politician
- Prem Jayanth (1931–1997), Sri Lankan actor, producer, and artist
- Prem Shankar Jha (born 1938), Indian newspaper editor
- Prem Joshua, German musician, active since 1991
- Prem Bahadur Kansakar (1918–1991), Nepalese politician and activist
- Prem Kaur (fl. 1822–1843), wife of Sikh ruler Sher Singh
- Prem Krishen, Indian actor and producer, son of Prem Nath, active since 1981
- Prem Krishna Khanna (1894–1993), Indian revolutionary
- Prem Kumar (disambiguation)
- Prem Mathur (fl. 1947–1949), first female Indian commercial pilot
- Prem Menon (actor), actor and director in Tamil films
- Prem Nath (1916–1992), actor in Hindi films
- Prem Nawas (fl. 1952–1980), actor and producer of Malayalam films
- Prem Nazir (1926–1989), actor in Malayalam films
- Prem Kishore Patakha (born 1943), Hindi language poet
- Prem Dhoj Pradhan (1938–2021), Nepalese musician
- Prem Chand Pandey (born 1945), Indian scientist and academic
- Prem Panicker, Indian cricket journalist
- Prem Parkash (1932–2025), Indian author
- Prem Prakash, actor and producer in Malayalam films, active since 1968
- Prem Purachatra (1915–1981), prince of Thailand
- Prem Radhakishun (born 1962), Dutch-Surinamese lawyer, columnist, actor, and producer
- Prem Das Rai (born 1954), Indian politician
- Prem Raj, Indian film director
- Prem Rakshith, choreographer
- Prem Rawat (born 1957), Indian religious leader
- Prem Reddy (born 1948), Indian-American cardiologist and major owner of Prime Healthcare Services
- Prem Sahgal (1917–1992), British Indian Army and Indian National Army officer
- Prem Kumar Sharma (fl. 1993), Indian politician
- Prem Lata Sharma, Indian musicologist, scholar, and educator
- Prem Sikka, British professor of accounting
- Prem Singh (Fijian politician) (fl. 2001–2002), member of the Fijian parliament
- Prem Lal Singh, Nepalese politician
- Prem Bahadur Singh, Nepalese politician
- Prem Maya Sonir (born 1961), Indian hockey player and coach
- Prem Suri, Jain religious teacher
- Prem Nath Thapar (1903–1969), Indian civil servant
- Prem Khandu Thungan (born 1946), Indian politician
- Prem Tinsulanonda (1920–2019), Thai military officer, Prime Minister of Thailand from 1980 to 1988
- Prem Watsa (born 1950), founder, chairman, and chief executive of Fairfax Financial Holdings

=== Mononym ===
- Prem (film director), Indian film director and actor Kiran Kumar (born 1978)
- Prem (Kannada actor), Indian film actor Prem Kumar (born 1976)

=== Surname ===
- Aneeta Prem, British author, human rights campaigner, and magistrate
- Heimrad Prem (1934–1978), German painter
- Krishna Prem (1898–1965), British-Indian spiritual teacher
- Rohan Prem (born 1986), Indian cricketer

=== Other ===
- Ngarmchit Purachatra (1915–1983), princess of Thailand, also known as Princess Prem Purachatra after her husband

== Fictional characters ==
- Prem Chopra, self-titled villain in the 1973 Indian film Bobby, played by Prem Chopra
- Prem Choudhary, in the 1989 Indian film Maine Pyar Kiya, portrayed by Salman Khan
- Prem Bhopali, in the 1994 Indian film Andaz Apna Apna, portrayed by Khan
- Prem Nath, in the 1994 Indian film Hum Aapke Hain Koun..!, portrayed by Khan
- Prem Kumar, in the 1997 Indian film Deewana Mastana, portrayed by Khan
- Prem Malhotra, in the 1997 Indian film Judwaa, portrayed by Khan
- Prem, in the 1999 Indian film Biwi No.1, portrayed by Khan
- Prem, in the 1999 Indian film Hum Saath-Saath Hain, portrayed by Khan
- Prem, in the 1999 Indian film Sirf Tum, portrayed by Khan
- Prem Oberoi, in the 2000 Indian film Chal Mere Bhai, portrayed by Khan
- Prem Kapoor, in the 2000 Indian film Kahin Pyaar Na Ho Jaaye, portrayed by Khan
- Prem, in the 2005 Indian film No Entry, portrayed by Khan
- Prem, in the 2007 Indian film Marigold, portrayed by Khan
- Prem, in the 2007 Indian film Partner, portrayed by Khan
- Prem Kapoor, in the 2011 Indian film Ready, portrayed by Khan
- Prem, in the 2015 Indian film Prem Ratan Dhan Payo, portrayed by Khan

== Places ==
- Prem, Bavaria, Germany
- Prem, Ilirska Bistrica, Slovenia

== Other uses ==
- Prem (film), a 1995 Hindi film
- Prem (food), a brand of canned meat
- Prem (Hinduism), a concept of elevated love
- Preliminary Reference Earth Model, a commonly used 1 D reference model for the structure of the Earth
- Colloquial name for the English Premier League
- PREM Rugby, the English professional rugby union league

== See also ==
- Prema (disambiguation)
- Premie (disambiguation)
- Priya (disambiguation)
