= Oak Island, Texas =

Census-designated place in the United States

- Census-designated place
- Location within Texas
- Coordinates: 29°39′46″N 94°41′17″W
- Country: United States
- State: Texas
- County: Chambers

Area
  - Total: 1.20 sq mi (3.11 km^{2})
  - Land: 1.20 sq mi (3.11 km^{2})
  - Water: 0 sq mi (0.0 km^{2})
- Elevation: 7 ft (2.1 m)

Population (2020)
  - Total: 371
  - Density: 302/sq mi (116.7/km^{2})
- Time zone: UTC-6 (Central (CST))
  - Summer (DST): UTC-5 (CDT)
- Area code: 409
- FIPS code: 48-53004
- GNIS feature ID: 2586965

Oak Island is an unincorporated community and census-designated place (CDP) in Chambers County, Texas, United States. The population was 371 at the 2020 census.

== Geography ==
Oak Island is located on the eastern shore of Trinity Bay, near the geographic center of Chambers County. It is 8 miles (13 km) south of Anahuac, the Chambers County seat.

According to the United States Census Bureau, the Oak Island CDP has a total area of 1.20 square miles (3.11 km^{2}), all land.

== Demographics ==
Historical population
Census	Pop.	Note	%±
2010	363		—
2020	371		2.2%
U.S. Decennial Census; 1850–1900 1910; 1920 1930 1940; 1950 1960 1970; 1980 1990 2000; 2010 2020

Oak Island first appeared as a census designated place in the 2010 U.S. census.

Oak Island CDP, Texas – Racial and ethnic composition Note: the US Census treats Hispanic/Latino as an ethnic category. This table excludes Latinos from the racial categories and assigns them to a separate category. Hispanics/Latinos may be of any race.
Race / Ethnicity (NH = Non-Hispanic)	Pop 2010	Pop 2020	% 2010	% 2020
White alone (NH)	211	201	58.13%	54.18%
Black or African American alone (NH)	5	9	1.38%	2.43%
Native American or Alaska Native alone (NH)	0	0	0.00%	0.00%
Asian alone (NH)	64	73	17.63%	19.68%
Native Hawaiian or Pacific Islander alone (NH)	0	0	0.00%	0.00%
Other race alone (NH)	0	1	0.00%	0.27%
Mixed race or Multiracial (NH)	3	16	0.83%	4.31%
Hispanic or Latino (any race)	80	71	22.04%	19.14%
Total	363	371	100.00%	100.00%

As of the 2020 United States census, there were 371 people, 135 households, and 126 families residing in the CDP.

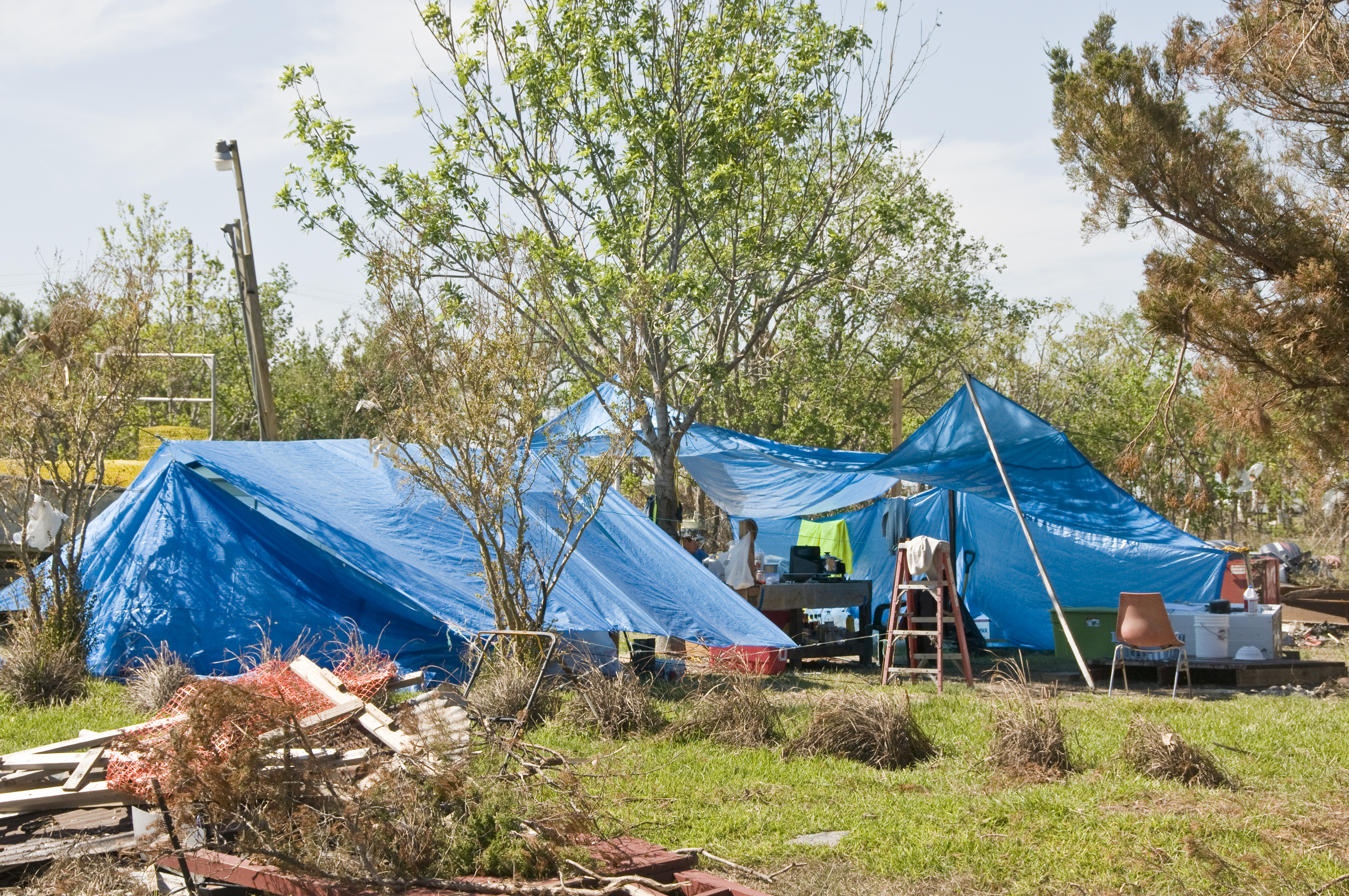
Oak Island residents temporarily living in tents after Hurricane Ike

== Hurricane Ike ==
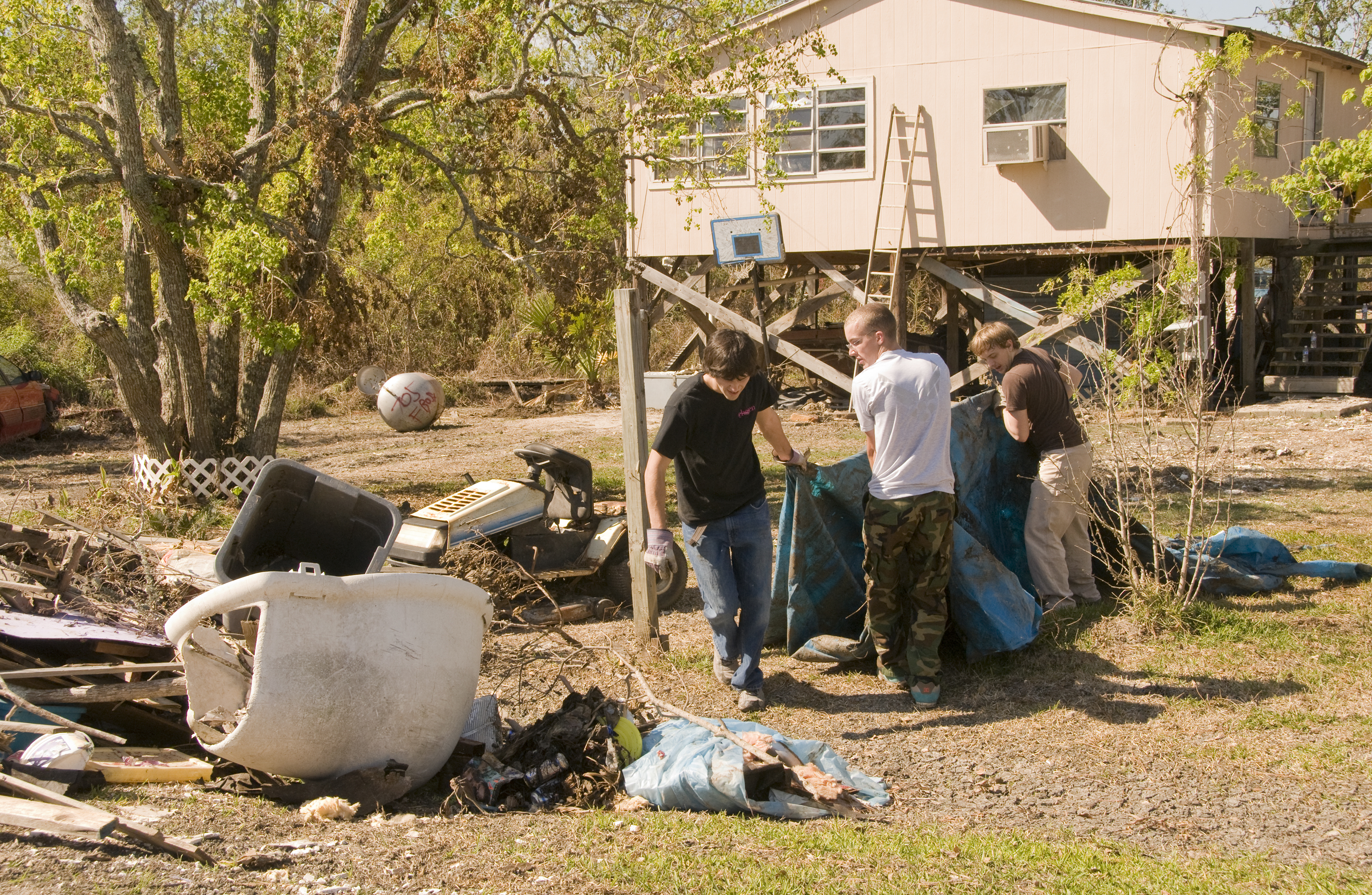
Texas teens assisting in clean up efforts after hurricane Ike

On September 13, 2008, Hurricane Ike rendered about 90% of the community's homes uninhabitable.

== Education ==
Anahuac Independent School District operates schools in the area. Anahuac High School is the district's comprehensive high school.

Residents of Anahuac ISD are zoned to Lee College.
