= Prema =

Prema may refer to:

== Film ==
- Prema (1952 film), an Indian Telugu-language film
- Prema (1989 film), an Indian Telugu-language film, starring Venkatesh and Revathi
- Prema (2002 film), an Indian Kannada-language film

== Music ==
- Prema (album), 2025 studio album by Fujii Kaze

== People ==
- Prema (Kannada actress), Indian actress in the Kannada film industry
- Prema (Malayalam actress) (fl. 1954–1981), Indian film actress in Malayalam cinema, mother of Shobha
- Prema (musician), British recording artist
- Prema Kiran (1961–2022), Indian film actress in Marathi cinema

== Other uses ==
- Premavision and its subsidiary Prema Toy Company, founded by Gumby and Pokey cartoonist Art Clokey
- Prema Arts Centre, Uley, Gloucestershire, England
- Prem (Hinduism), a concept of elevated love in Hinduism
- Prema Racing, a motorsport team from Italy

== See also ==
- List of tropical cyclones named Prema, a name used for two tropical cyclones in the South Pacific Ocean
- Premam, a 2015 Indian film Alphonse Puthren
  - Premam (soundtrack)
- Premam (2016 film), a 2016 Indian film Chandoo Mondeti
- Premalu, a 2024 Indian film
  - Premalu (soundtrack)
- Premamayi, a 1966 Indian film
- Prem (disambiguation)
- Premabhishekam (disambiguation)
- Priya (disambiguation)
