= Mikhael Ricks =

American football player (born 1974)

No. 10, 86, 85
- Positions: Tight end, wide receiver

Personal information
- Born: November 14, 1974 (age 51); Galveston, Texas, U.S.
- Listed height: 6 ft 5 in (1.96 m)
- Listed weight: 260 lb (118 kg)

Career information
- High school: Anahuac (Anahuac, Texas)
- College: Stephen F. Austin
- NFL draft: 1998: 2nd round, 59th overall pick

Career history
- San Diego Chargers (1998–2000); Kansas City Chiefs (2000–2001); Detroit Lions (2002–2003); New York Jets (2004)*; Dallas Cowboys (2004)
- * Offseason or practice squad member only

Career NFL statistics
- Receptions: 155
- Receiving yards: 1,939
- Receiving touchdowns: 8
- Stats at Pro Football Reference

Mikhael Roy Ricks (born November 14, 1974) is an American former professional football player who was a tight end in the National Football League (NFL). He played college football for the Stephen F. Austin Lumberjacks

Ricks attended Anahuac High School in Anahuac, Texas. He went to college at Stephen F. Austin State University, where he played football and basketball. He was selected by the San Diego Chargers in the second round of the 1998 NFL draft with the 59th overall pick. He played in 16 games in his first season with the Chargers. He has also played for the Kansas City Chiefs, Detroit Lions, and Dallas Cowboys.
