= Atlas Air Flight 3591 =

2019 aviation accident in Texas

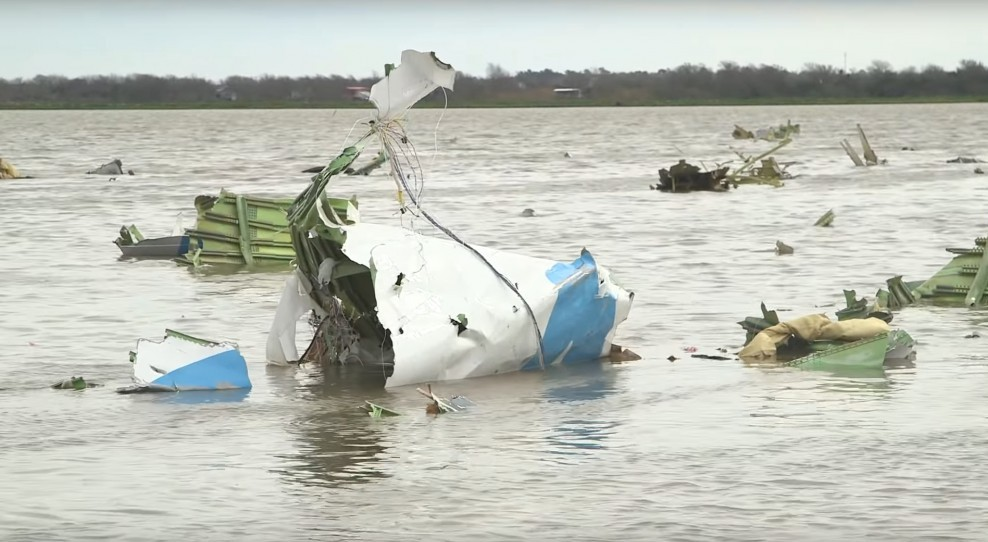
- Wreckage of the aircraft in Trinity Bay

Accident
- Date: February 23, 2019
- Summary: Crashed following spatial disorientation on approach due to pilot error
- Site: Trinity Bay; near Anahuac, Texas; 29°45′50″N 94°42′53″W

Aircraft
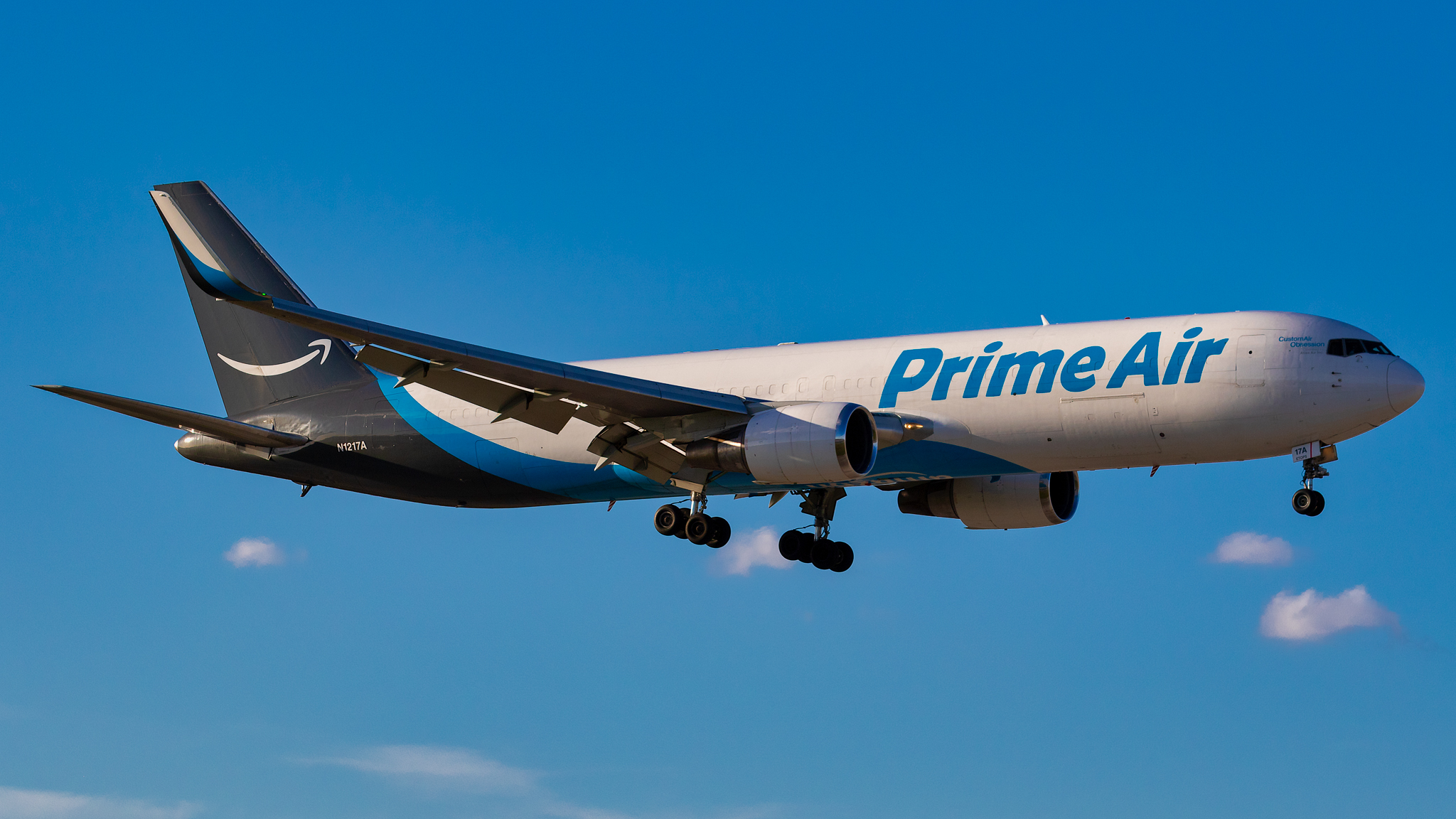
- N1217A, the aircraft involved, seen 9 days before the accident
- Aircraft type: Boeing 767-375ER (BCF)
- Aircraft name: CustomAir Obsession
- Operator: Atlas Air on behalf of Amazon Air
- IATA flight No.: 5Y3591
- ICAO flight No.: GTI3591
- Call sign: GIANT 3591
- Registration: N1217A
- Flight origin: Miami International Airport, Miami, Florida, United States
- Destination: George Bush Intercontinental Airport, Houston, Texas, United States
- Occupants: 3
- Passengers: 1
- Crew: 2
- Fatalities: 3
- Survivors: 0

Atlas Air Flight 3591 was a scheduled domestic cargo flight between Miami International Airport and George Bush Intercontinental Airport in Houston, operated by Atlas Air on behalf of Amazon Air. On February 23, 2019, the Boeing 767 operating this flight crashed into Trinity Bay during approach into Houston, killing the two crew members and single passenger on board. The accident occurred near Anahuac, Texas, east of Houston, shortly before 12:45 CST (18:45 UTC). This was the first fatal crash of a Boeing 767 freighter, and the first fatal crash involving Amazon Air.

Investigators attributed the accident to pilot error, finding that the first officer – who had years of flight performance issues at four previous airlines – experienced spatial disorientation and inadvertently placed the aircraft in an unrecoverable dive, while the captain failed to adequately monitor the first officer's actions and the flight path of the aircraft. Flight crew training issues at Atlas Air and across the U.S. commercial aviation industry were also implicated.

== Background ==
=== Aircraft ===
The Boeing 767-375ER(BCF) (MSN 25865/430) aircraft was registered N1217A and was nearly 27 years old at the time of the accident, having been built in 1992. It was originally ordered by Canadian Airlines, but it was first placed into service by China Southern Airlines through GPA, an aircraft leasing company. In 1997, the aircraft was transferred to LAN Airlines and flew until 2014 before being returned to lessor CIT, which then stored it in January 2016. In April 2017, the 767 was converted into a freighter and placed into service for Amazon Air by Atlas Air. In August 2018, Amazon named two aircraft in its fleet, including N1217A as CustomAir Obsession. The name, painted on the aircraft just aft of the cockpit windows, was a near homonym of "customer obsession," an Amazon leadership principle. The aircraft had accumulated more than 91,000 hours across 23,300 flights and was powered by two GE CF6-80 turbofan engines.

=== Crew and passenger ===
There were three people on board the aircraft: Captain Ricky Blakely of Indiana (60), First Officer Conrad Jules Aska of Cedar Grove, Antigua (44), and Mesa Airlines captain Sean Archuleta of Houston (36; a jumpseater aboard the flight), who was in his final week of employment at Mesa Airlines and was traveling to work before beginning new-hire pilot training with United Airlines scheduled for the following week.

Blakely joined Atlas Air in 2015 and became a Boeing 767 captain in 2018. Before being hired by Atlas Air, Blakely had previously been an Embraer ERJ-145 captain for ExpressJet. He had also been a Beechcraft 1900 first officer for CommuteAir, and a flight instructor for FlightSafety International. Blakely logged a total of 11,172 flight hours, including 1,252 hours on the Boeing 767.

Aska joined Atlas Air on July 3, 2017, and received his type rating on the Boeing 767 two months later. He had logged 5,073 flight hours, with 520 of them on the 767. Aska had previously been an Embraer E175 first officer with Mesa Airlines (and served with five other airlines prior to that) and also had experience on Embraer's EMB 120 Brasilia and ERJ aircraft families.

Both pilots had previous experience in landing at George Bush Intercontinental Airport and they flew together on the previous day, operating a night-time flight from California to Miami.

== Accident ==
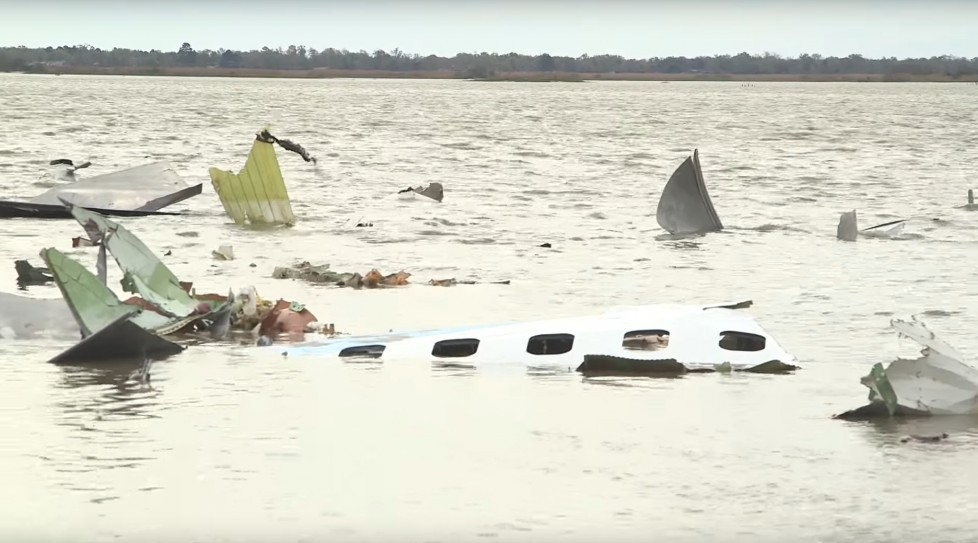
Another view of the crash site. The window plugs, which had been installed during the aircraft’s cargo conversion, had blown out on impact with the water.

Atlas Air 3591 departed Miami at 10:33 CST (11:33 EST), with First Officer Aska as pilot flying and Captain Blakely pilot monitoring. At 12:36, Aska transferred control of the aircraft to Blakely, telling him that the electronic flight instrument (EFI) switch on his side had malfunctioned. This issue was resolved a minute later, with the following being recorded on the cockpit voice recorder (CVR):

Aska: "I press the E-fy button, it fixes everything."

Blakely: "Oh ya ya."

Flight 3591 was on approach towards Houston when it flew through the forward edge of a cold front, which produced an area of instrument meteorological conditions (IMC) with clouds and turbulence, with cloud tops varying from approximately 19,500 feet (5,900 m) to 27,300 feet (8,300 m) of altitude and cloud bases varying from 2,000 feet (610 m) to 3,000 feet (910 m) above ground level. The pilot of another nearby airliner reported IMC, and a video taken by a ground witness showed a shelf cloud passing over the area at the time.

Aska then requested radar vectors to the west side of the airport to avoid the inclement weather. The controller accepted but also advised the crew to expedite their descent to 3,000 feet (910 m) and said, "I'm gunna get ya west of this weather and northbound for a base leg." Blakely then transferred control of the aircraft back to Aska:

Aska: "Ok. Two seven zero."
Blakely: "Your controls."
Aska: "My controls."

The flight crew then started to configure the aircraft for landing and set up the flight management system (FMS). At 12:38:02.2 CST, Aska called out "flaps one”, and the slats were extended. 29 seconds later, the aircraft's go-around mode was inadvertently activated. At 12:38:40.3, the following was heard on the CVR:

Cockpit area microphone (CAM): [Sound of master caution aural warning]

Blakely (radio transmission): "Sounds good uh Giant thirty-five ninety-one."

Approach controller: "It is severe clear on the other side of this stuff so you'll have no problem gettin' the airport [unintelligible word] (either)."

Aska: "Oh. Woah! (Where's) my speed my speed? [Spoken in elevated voice]

CAM: [Sound similar to a mechanical click]

Blakely (radio transmission): "Okay."

Aska: "We're stalling! Stall!" [Exclaimed]

Voice unidentified: "[Expletive]"

Aska: "Lord…you have my soul."

Reconstruction of the final 20 seconds of the accident sequence

The aircraft sharply turned south before going into a rapid descent. Witnesses to the crash described the plane as entering a nosedive; some also recalled hearing "what sounded like lightning" before the Boeing 767 collided with the ground.

At 12:36 CST (18:36 UTC), radar and radio contact was lost. There was no distress call. At 12:39:03.9 CST (18:39:03.9 UTC), the time the CVR recording ended, Flight 3591 crashed into the north end of Trinity Bay at Jack's Pocket. The area of water is within Chambers County, Texas, in proximity to Anahuac.

The Federal Aviation Administration (FAA) issued an alert after radar and radio contact was lost around 30 miles (50 km) southeast of its destination. Air traffic controllers tried at least twice to contact the flight, with no response. Controllers asked pilots of two nearby flights whether or not they saw a crash site, both of whom said they did not; the crash site was located after ground witnesses called local police to report having seen the aircraft dive into the bay. The United States Coast Guard dispatched a helicopter and several boats to search for survivors, and other agencies responded. The crash site was mostly mud marsh, with water varying in depth from zero to five feet (1.5 m) deep, thus airboats were needed to access the area. Searchers found human remains and many small fragments of the aircraft and its cargo. The largest recovered piece of the aircraft was 50 ft (15 m) in length. The local sheriff described the scene as "total devastation" and surmised that the crash had not been survivable.

Map of crash site

== Victims ==
On February 24, Atlas Air confirmed that all three people on board died. The victims were first identified on social media by friends and family. By February 26, the bodies of all three had been recovered, and by March 4, all had been positively identified.

== Investigation ==
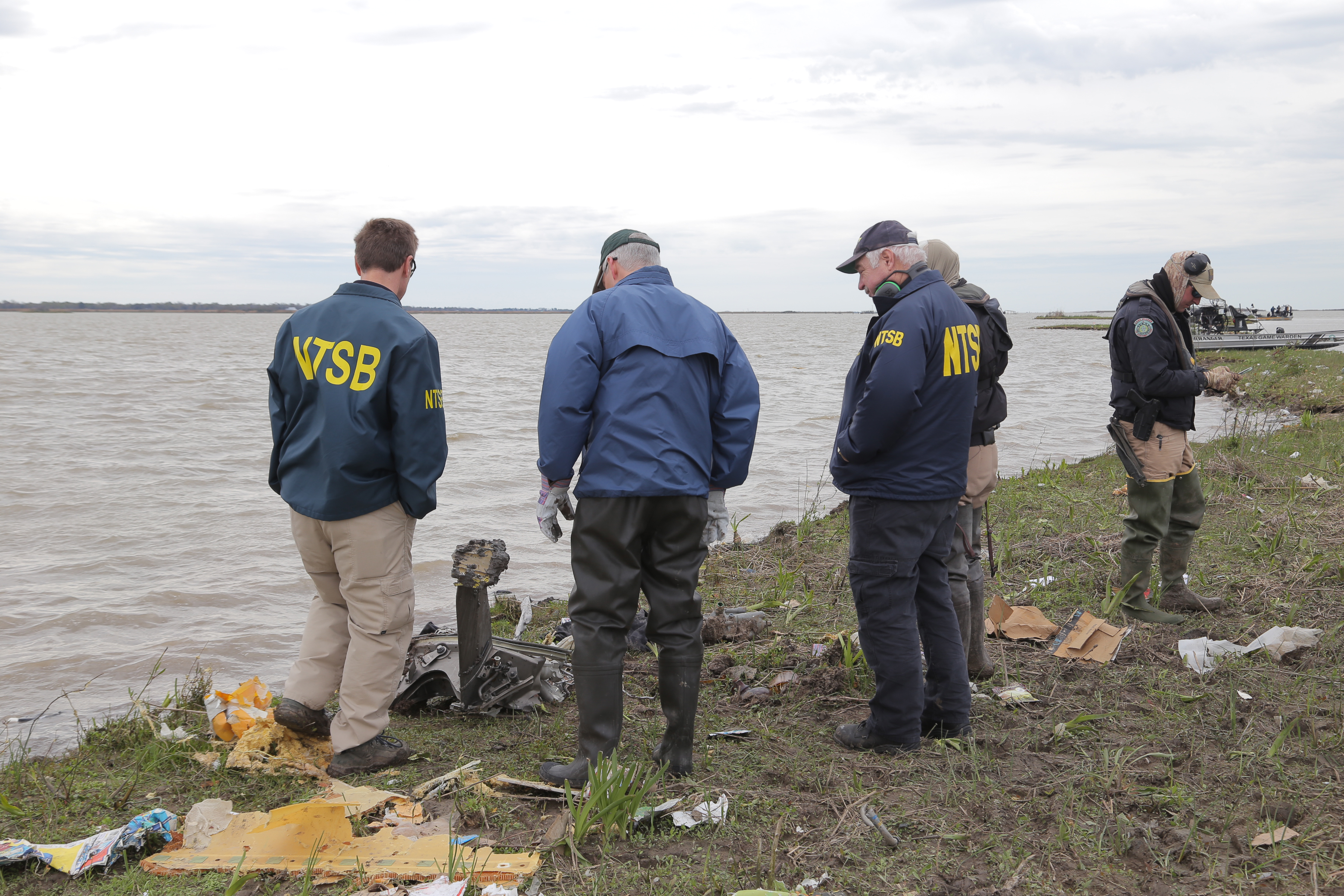
NTSB investigators examine debris at the edge of Trinity Bay

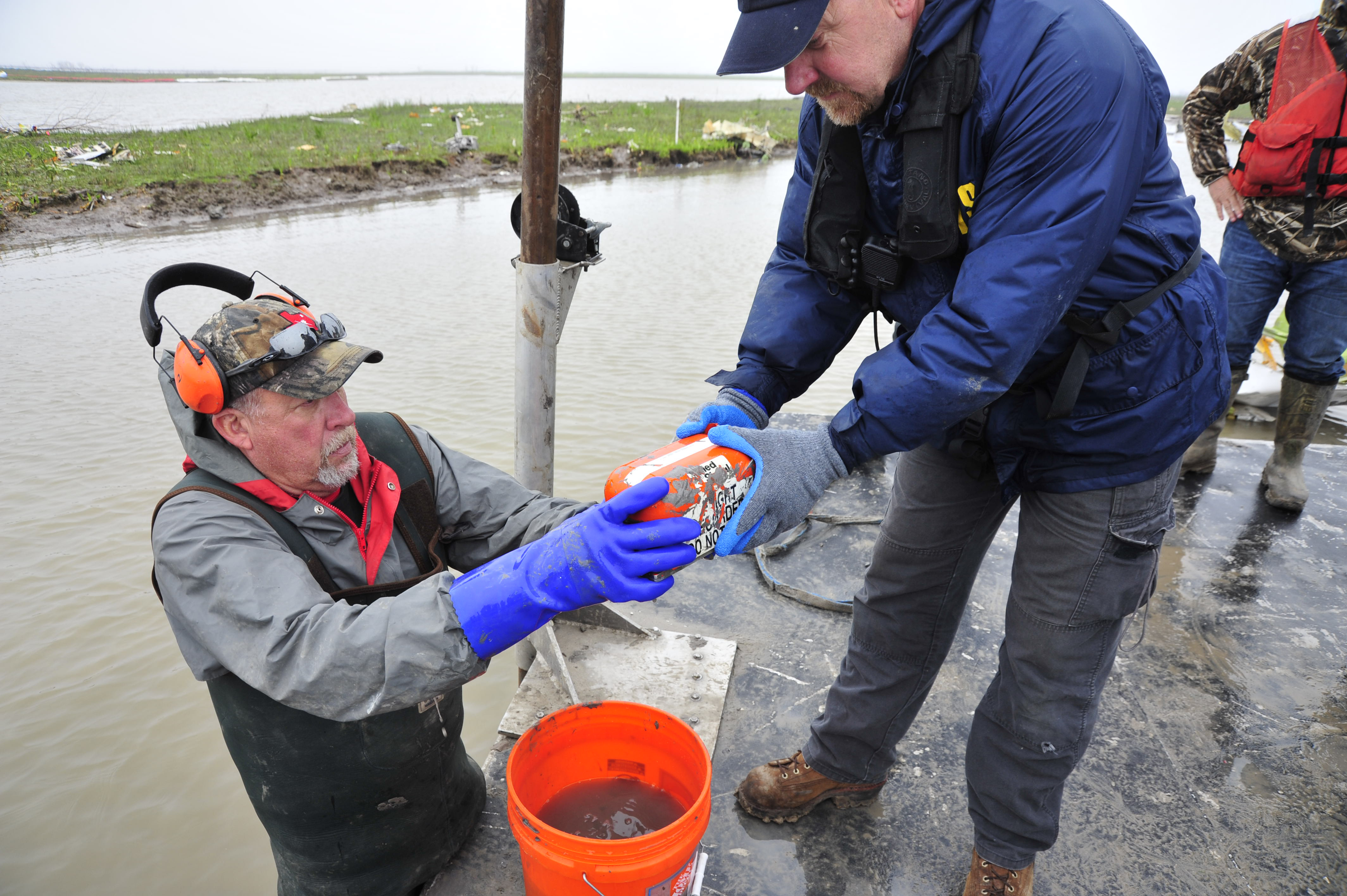
NTSB investigators recover the flight data recorder from Trinity Bay

Investigators from the FAA, Federal Bureau of Investigation (FBI), and National Transportation Safety Board (NTSB) were dispatched to the accident site with the NTSB leading the accident investigation. A dive team from the Texas Department of Public Safety (DPS) was tasked with locating the aircraft's flight recorders and dive teams from the Houston and Baytown police departments were also on-scene assisting in the search. The CVR and flight data recorder (FDR) were located and transported to an NTSB lab for analysis. It was thought that investigators would likely remain at the accident site for weeks for recovery.

It was noted that storm cells were nearby at the time of the accident, but this is not unusual for Bush Intercontinental. CCTV cameras at the Chambers County jail show the airplane in a steep, nose-low descent just prior to impact.

The FAA, Boeing, Atlas Air, National Air Traffic Controllers Association (NATCA), International Brotherhood of Teamsters, Air Line Pilots Association, and engine maker General Electric assisted or offered their assistance to the NTSB inquiry.

After listening to the cockpit voice recorder, the NTSB stated that "Crew communications consistent with a loss of control of the aircraft began approximately 18 seconds prior to the end of the recording." On March 12, the NTSB stated that the airplane "pitched nose down over the next 18 seconds to about 49° in response to column input." Later that day, amended its statement to "...in response to nose-down elevator deflection."

On December 19, 2019, the NTSB released a public docket containing over 3,000 pages of factual information it had collected during the investigation, with a final report to follow at an unspecified later date. The docket contains information on "operations, survival factors, human performance, air traffic control, aircraft performance, and includes the cockpit voice recorder transcript, sound spectrum study, and the flight data recorder information."

On June 11, 2020, the NTSB announced that the next board meeting would determine the cause of the accident; the NTSB determined during a public board meeting held on July 14, that the flight crashed because of the first officer's inappropriate response to an inadvertent activation of the airplane's go-around mode, resulting in his spatial disorientation that led him to place the airplane in a steep descent from which the crew did not recover. The NTSB released an animation of the mishap sequence of events from the selection of Go-Around thrust to the fatal crash 31 seconds later.

=== Conclusions ===
On August 6, 2020, the NTSB posted the final accident report to their website, which stated:

The NTSB determines that the probable cause of this accident was the inappropriate response by the first officer as the pilot flying to an inadvertent activation of the go-around mode, which led to his spatial disorientation and nose-down control inputs that placed the airplane in a steep descent from which the crew did not recover. Contributing to the accident was the captain's failure to adequately monitor the airplane's flightpath and assume positive control of the airplane to effectively intervene. Also contributing were systemic deficiencies in the aviation industry's selection and performance measurement practices, which failed to address the first officer's aptitude-related deficiencies and maladaptive stress response. Also contributing to the accident was the Federal Aviation Administration's failure to implement the pilot records database in a sufficiently robust and timely manner.

The NTSB found that the descent had proceeded normally until the go-around mode was activated and the aircraft's autopilot and autothrottle increased engine thrust and nose-up pitch as designed. Neither pilot verbally acknowledged that go-around mode had been actuated nor took any apparent action to deactivate it. Moments later, the first officer made nose-down flight control inputs for stall recovery, but the aircraft's stall warning systems had not activated and FDR data was inconsistent with an aircraft in a stalled condition. The NTSB concluded that the first officer most likely struck the go-around switch accidentally with his left wrist or his wristwatch while manipulating the nearby speedbrake lever and that neither pilot realized that the aircraft's automated flight mode had been changed. During a stall, established procedures called for the pilot flying (PF) to "Hold the control column firmly", "Disengage the autopilot and autothrottle", and "Smoothly apply nose-down elevator control to reduce the AOA (angle-of-attack) until stick shaker or buffet stops". The procedures further state that the pilot monitoring (in this case the captain) should monitor and call out changes in altitude / airspeed, call out any trend toward terrain, and verify that all required actions are being completed. While the first officer's flight control inputs were aggressive enough to override the autopilot, investigators concluded that the captain was distracted performing other tasks and had failed to monitor the aircraft's performance.

The NTSB concluded that the aircraft was likely flying in IMC without the ground visible when the go-around mode was activated, and the first officer most likely experienced a pitch-up or head-up somatogravic illusion, the false sensation that one is tilting backwards during unexpected forward acceleration in the absence of visible landmarks. Pilots with limited instrument flight proficiency have a well-documented tendency to disregard flight instruments and act instinctively in reaction to this illusion. Investigators concluded that the pilots were unable to see the ground until the aircraft exited the clouds approximately 3,000 feet (910 m) above the bay, at which point safe recovery from the steep descent would have been impossible.

The NTSB was unable to determine why the first officer cycled the EFI switch prior to the accident; however, cycling the EFI switch in the 767 is generally done to solve intermittent display blanking and does not change the source of the data shown on the display, and the NTSB concluded that "whatever EFIS display anomaly the FO [first officer] experienced was resolved to both crewmembers' satisfaction (by the FO's cycling of the EFI switch) before the events related to the accident sequence occurred."

=== Flight crew training issues ===
The NTSB noted that both pilots had difficulties in their training. Blakely experienced difficulties during training for his type rating on the 767. On October 31, 2015, he was declared unfit for a checkride due to unsatisfactory remarks on his training which included the following:

- Allowing airspeed to exceed flap limits during stall recovery training
- Forgetting to set the missed approach altitude
- Difficulties in performing missed approaches

Blakely underwent remedial training the next day on November 1, this time with satisfactory results. The day after, he had his 767 checkride, and received his type rating on the aircraft two days later. Despite Blakely's improvements, Atlas Air placed him in the pilot proficiency watch program (PWP) due to his training issues.

First officer Aska had also experienced training difficulties with Atlas Air, more so than Blakely. According to the NTSB, Aska had been unable to complete pilot training at two other airlines, which he did not disclose on his job applications to Atlas. The NTSB found that Aska had a "long history of training performance deficiencies", with a "tendency to respond impulsively and inappropriately when faced with an unexpected event during training scenarios". Aska's first issues at Atlas emerged in July 2017, the same month he joined the airline, when he was declined an oral exam for his type rating on the 767 as he needed remediation training. Following the training, he passed the oral exam. Aska then went through five fixed-base (non-moving) flight simulator sessions, experiencing difficulties with normal procedures, and underwent more remediation training. In August, following two full-flight simulator training sessions, Aska's simulator partner complained that he was being "held back". Atlas Air ultimately had to restart full-flight simulator training for Aska because no other pilots remained in his training class to partner with him.

Aska's first checkride on the aircraft ended in failure due to poor crew resource management (CRM) and improper aircraft control. His examiner described him as stressed and lacking situational awareness. Aska underwent remedial training on September 25 and the next day, he reattempted his checkride successfully, receiving his type rating on the aircraft.

The NTSB concluded that Aska had been able to conceal his spotty training record because of shortcomings in the FAA pilot records database, and criticized the FAA for failing to upgrade the database earlier. A 2010 amendment to the Pilot Record Improvement Act (PRIA) passed after the 2009 crash of Colgan Air Flight 3407 required the FAA to record training failures in the database; however, this provision had not been fully implemented due to privacy concerns and industry opposition, particularly from business aviation operators who objected to the program's stringent record-keeping requirements. Atlas Air was also criticized for its reliance on agents rather than flight operations specialists to check the training backgrounds of pilots it hired. Atlas Air's director of training said they would not have hired Aska if they had known his full training record.

The NTSB recommended that pilots of the 767 and the similar Boeing 757 be trained to recognize and recover from inadvertent go-around mode actuation, but also concluded that available data suggested that such an actuation was a "rare and typically benign event".

== In popular culture ==
The crash of Atlas Air Flight 3591 was featured in the 2023 episode "Delivery to Disaster", of the Canadian-made, internationally distributed documentary series Mayday. This was season 23, episode 9 in Canada, while in the U.S. it was broadcast on the Smithsonian Channel series Air Disasters, season 19, episode 9, in List of Mayday Episodes.

== See also ==
- China Airlines Flight 140 – 1994 Airbus accident involving the inadvertent actuation of go-around mode
- Delta Air Lines Flight 723
- Gulf Air Flight 072 – 2000 Airbus accident involving a sensory illusion after actuation of go-around mode
- 21 Air Flight 7598 – 2026 accident involving another Boeing 767 operated on behalf of Amazon Air that crashed at Miami International Airport
