= PRIA =

PRIA may refer to:

- International Conference on Pattern Recognition and Image Analysis, a biennial scientific international conference
- Pre-Roman Iron Age, a Northern European archaeological period
- Proceedings of the Royal Irish Academy, an Irish journal
- Public Relations Institute of Australia, an Australian association of communication professionals
- Pilot Record Improvement Act, a United States law enhancing recordkeeping of pilots by the Federal Aviation Administration

== See also ==
- Pria (disambiguation)
- Passenger Rail Investment and Improvement Act of 2008 (PRIIA)
