= Monroe, Texas =

Monroe, Texas may refer to the following:

- Monroe, Rusk County, Texas
- Monroe City, Texas, in Chambers County
- New Deal, Texas, a town in Lubbock County formerly known as Monroe

== See also ==
- Conroe, Texas
