= Hall Whitley =

American football player (born 1935)

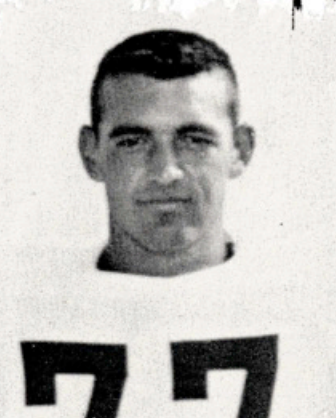
- Whitley at Texas A&M–Kingsville, c. 1956

No. 45, 41, 50
- Position: Linebacker

Personal information
- Born: July 18, 1935 (age 91)
- Listed height: 6 ft 2 in (1.88 m)
- Listed weight: 225 lb (102 kg)

Career information
- High school: Anahuac (Anahuac, Texas)
- College: Texas A&M–Kingsville
- NFL draft: 1957: 15th round, 173rd overall pick

Career history
- Winnipeg Blue Bombers (1957-1958); BC Lions (1958-1959); New York Titans (1960–1962)

Career AFL statistics
- Games played: 4
- Stats at Pro Football Reference

Hall Wood Whitley III (born July 18, 1935) is an American former professional football player who was a linebacker with the New York Titans of the American Football League (AFL), and in the Canadian Football League (CFL) for the Winnipeg Blue Bombers and BC Lions. He played college football for the Texas A&M–Kingsville Javelinas and is a member of their athletic hall of fame.
