= Delta Air Lines Flight 723 =

1973 aviation accident in Massachusetts

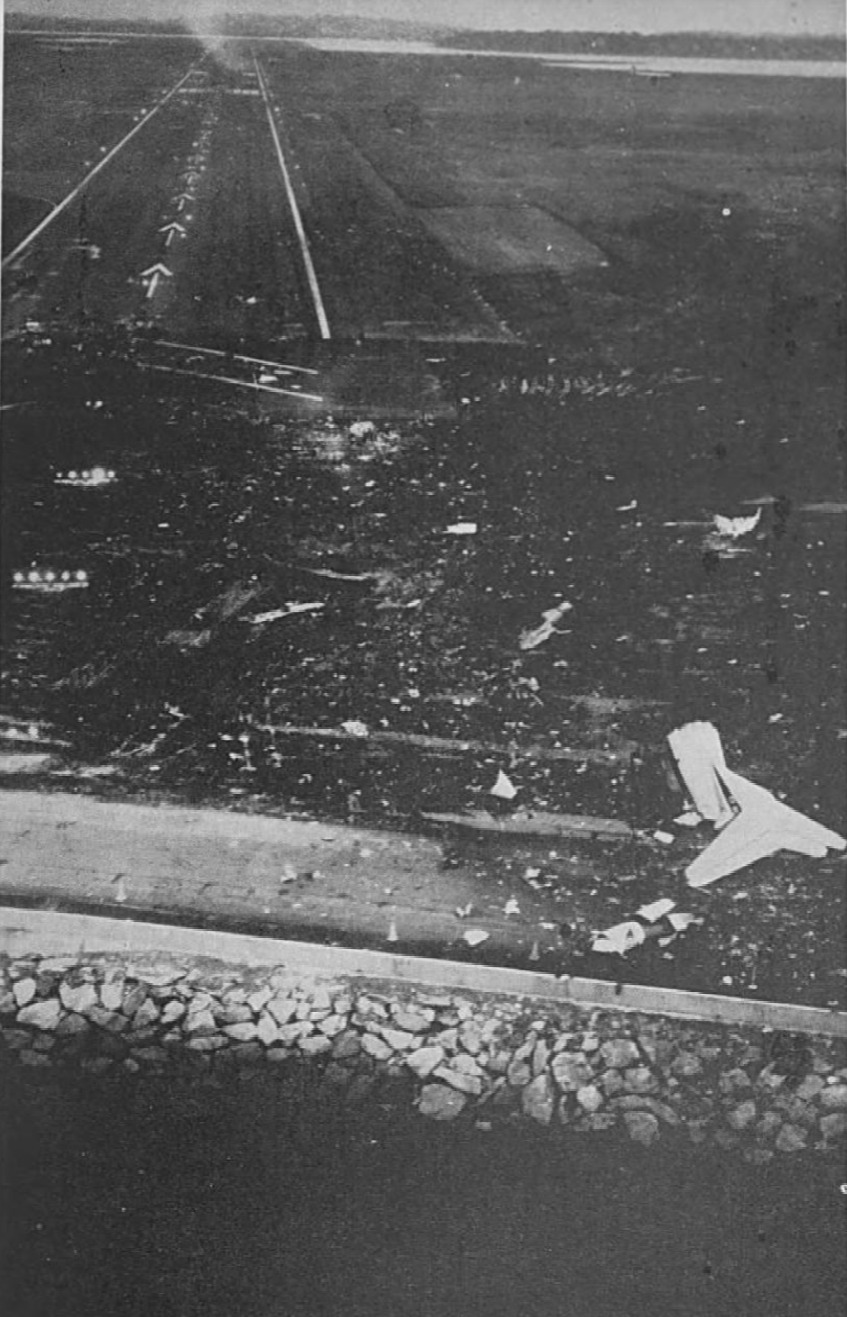
- Aerial view of the crash site

Accident
- Date: July 31, 1973
- Summary: Controlled flight into terrain due to pilot error and "nonstandard air traffic control services"
- Site: Logan International Airport Boston, Massachusetts, U.S.; 42°20′59″N 071°00′45″W

Aircraft
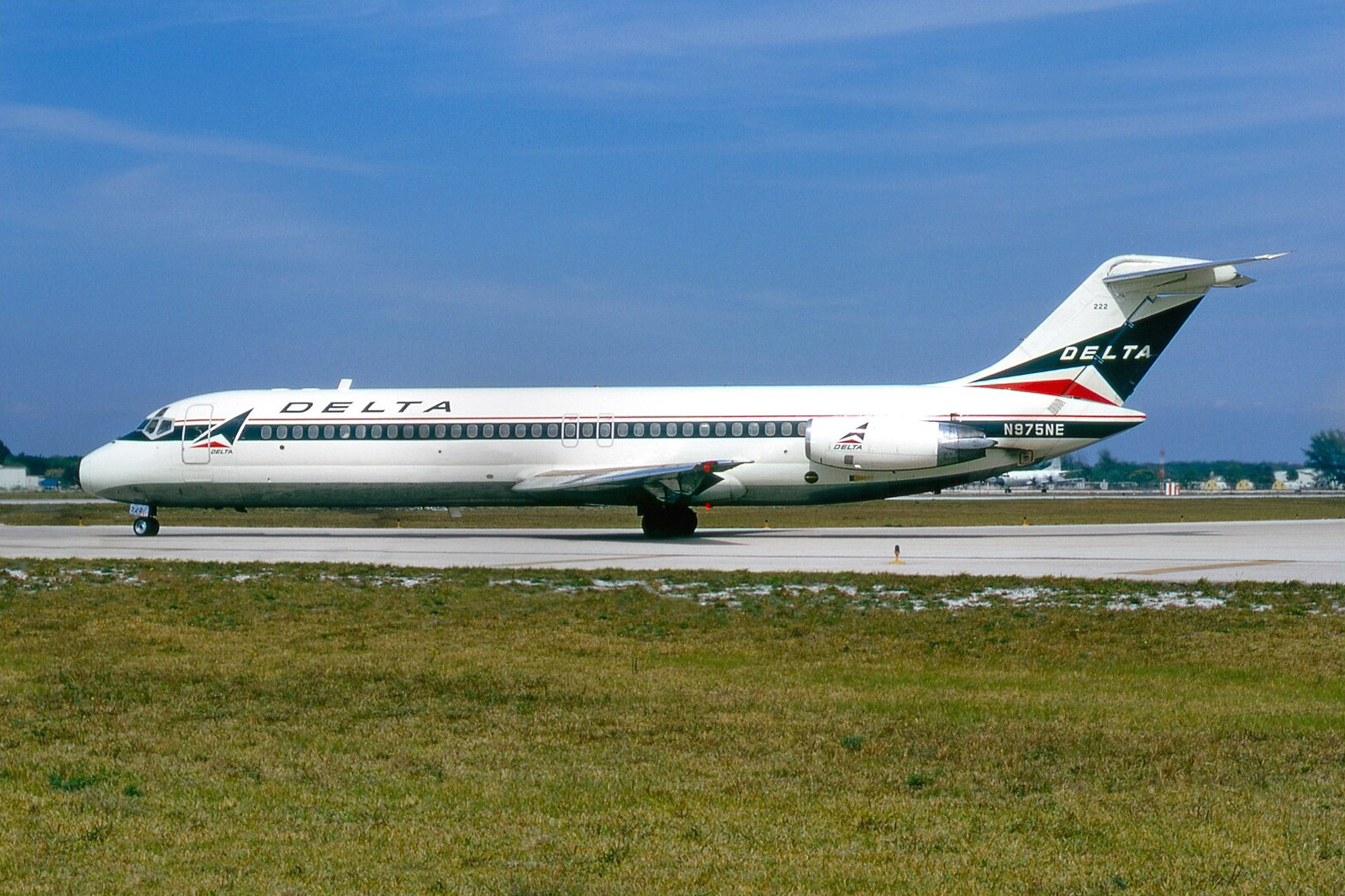
- N975NE, the aircraft involved in the accident, pictured in April 1973
- Aircraft type: McDonnell Douglas DC-9-31
- Operator: Delta Air Lines
- IATA flight No.: DL723
- ICAO flight No.: DAL723
- Call sign: DELTA 723
- Registration: N975NE
- Flight origin: Burlington International Airport, Burlington, Vermont, U.S.
- Stopover: Manchester-Boston Regional Airport, Manchester, New Hampshire, U.S.
- Destination: Logan International Airport, Boston, Massachusetts, U.S.
- Occupants: 89
- Passengers: 83
- Crew: 6
- Fatalities: 89
- Survivors: 0

Delta Air Lines Flight 723 was a scheduled domestic passenger flight operated by a McDonnell Douglas DC-9 twin-engine jetliner, from Burlington, Vermont, to Logan International Airport in Boston, Massachusetts, with an intermediate stop in Manchester, New Hampshire. On July 31, 1973, at 11:08 a.m., while on an instrument landing system (ILS) instrument approach into Logan in low clouds and fog, the aircraft descended below the glidepath, struck a seawall, and crashed. Out of the 89 people on board, 87 were killed on impact and one of the survivors died while being transported to hospital. The remaining survivor, who was Leopold Chouinard, would later die months after the crash, on December 11.—in the official report, he is listed as a survivor with critical injuries, due to length of time between the accident and when he died.

== Background ==
=== Aircraft ===
The aircraft involved was a McDonnell Douglas DC-9-31, registration N975NE, with serial number 47075. It had a manufactured date of September 25, 1967, and was originally delivered to Northeast Airlines; it was later transferred to Delta Air Lines after the two companies merged. In total, it had logged 14,639.7 flight hours at the time of the accident.

=== Crew ===
In command was 49-year-old Captain John N. Streil. He had logged around 14,840 hours of flying time, 1,457 of which were logged on the DC-9. He had 14 years of experience as pilot-in-command and had been flying DC-9s since 1970.

His co-pilot was 31-year-old First Officer Sidney W. Burrill. He had logged 6,994 hours of flying time, 217 hours of which were logged on the DC-9. Occupying the jump seat was a third pilot, 52-year-old Joseph E. Burrell, who was in training and was not yet qualified on the DC-9.

== Accident sequence ==
Delta Air Lines Flight 723 final approach from NTSB report

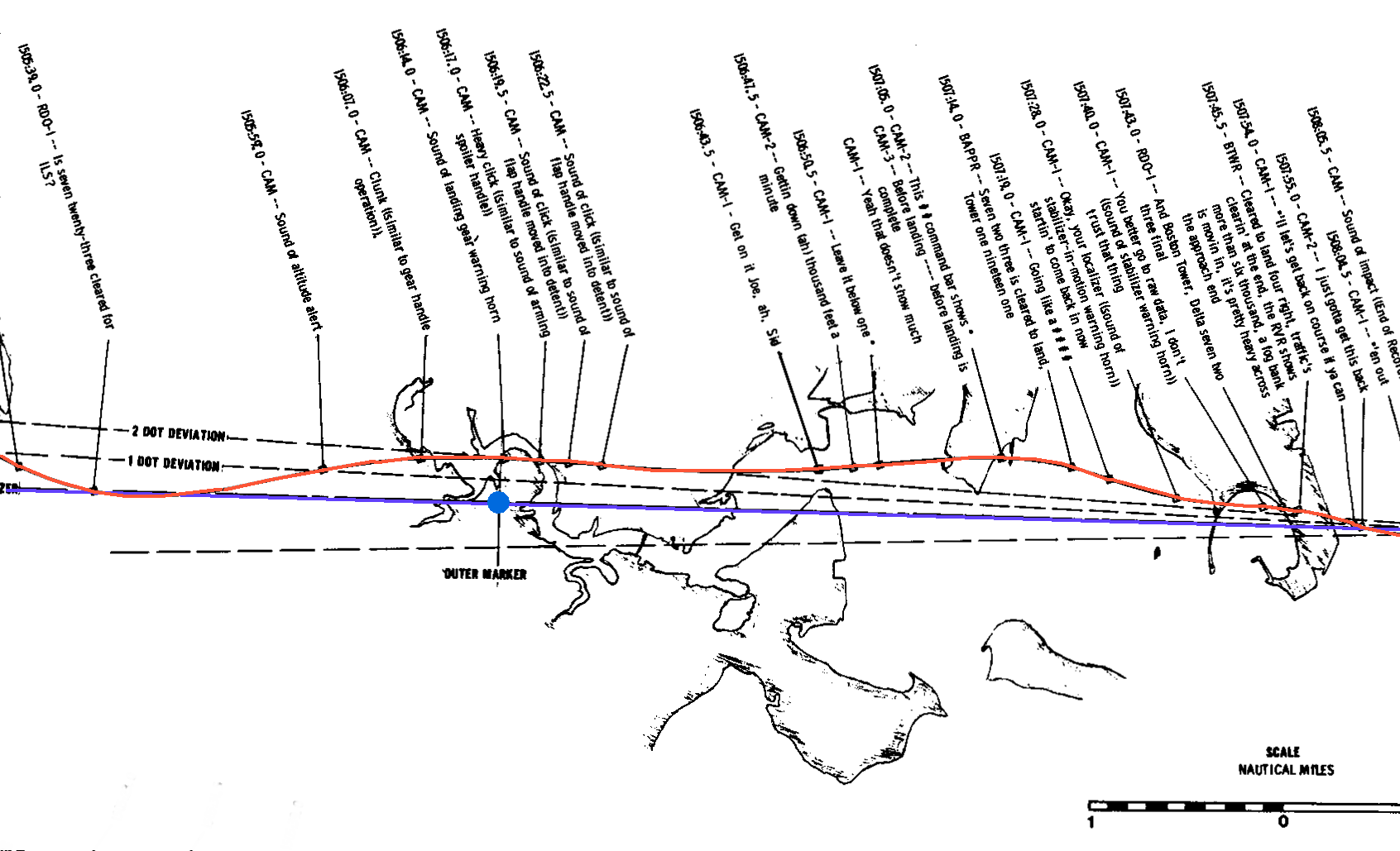
Plan view: actual path flown (red) is shown in relation to nominal localizer path (blue); outer marker is shown as blue dot; flight direction is from left to right.

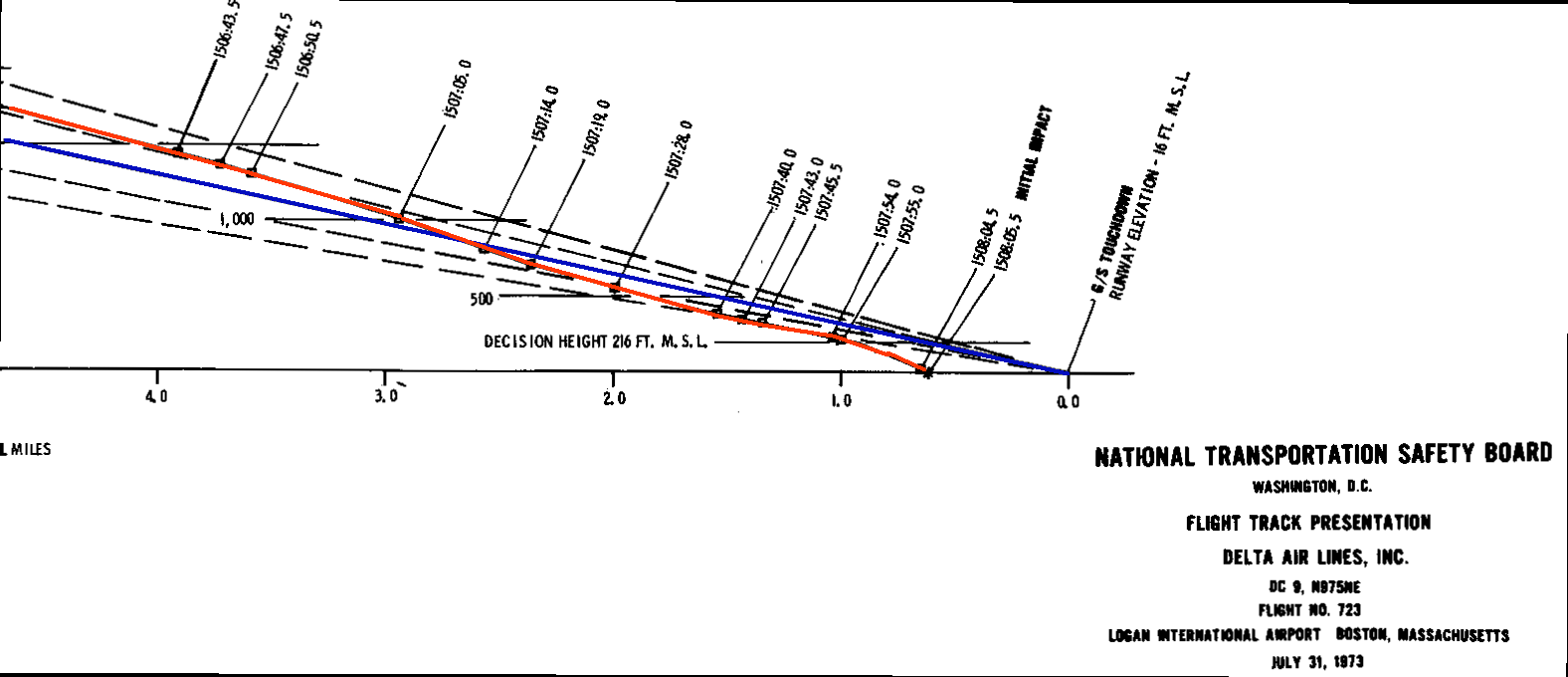
Descent profile: showing actual glide path flown (red), vs. nominal glideslope (blue), leading to crash point.

The aircraft, flying at 3,000 feet (910 m), had been vectored by Boston's approach control to intercept the final approach course to the ILS runway 4R approach at a 45-degree angle, (Note: According to the NTSB report, 30 degree is the normal recommended maximum ILS intercept angle near the outer marker.) about 2 nautical miles (3.7 km; 2.3 mi) outside the outer marker. The weather conditions at the time of the crash were partial obscuration and fog, with a ceiling of 400 feet (120 m), one-half mile (0.80 km) visibility, and light winds. Runway visual range (RVR) was 1,400 to 6,000 feet (430 to 1,830 m).

It was later revealed that the controller was busy handling a potential collision conflict between two other aircraft, and therefore neglected to clear Flight 723 for the approach. The flight crew had to ask the controller for approach clearance, which was immediately given, but by that time—more than a minute after the intercept vector had been issued—they were high and fast and almost over the outer marker. The flight crew subsequently failed to stabilize the aircraft's descent rate and airspeed, descended below the glideslope and drifted left of the localizer course, hitting a seawall about 165 feet (50 m) to the right of the extended runway centerline, about 3,000 feet (910 m) short of the runway's displaced threshold.

The aircraft was destroyed and 87 of its 89 occupants were dead when rescuers arrived. One of the two initial survivors died after two hours, and the other was Leopold Chouinard, a 20-year-old sergeant in the U.S. Air Force, who died of burn injuries on December 11, 1973. Chouinard is not listed by the National Transportation Safety Board (NTSB) as an official Delta 723 fatality due to requirements in the Code of Federal Regulations which, in 1973, defined a crash fatality as taking place within seven days of an accident. The rule was subsequently changed in 2018, such that death must occur within 30 days of a crash. Even under the revised rule, Chouinard would not be listed, as he died more than four months after the accident.

== Investigation ==
The NTSB investigated the accident and was able to retrieve both the cockpit voice recorder (CVR) and flight data recorder (FDR). The investigators concluded that, based on the retrieved flight data and simulations, the flight crew very likely operated the flight director improperly, inadvertently switching it into a "go around" mode during the final approach, instead of the appropriate approach mode. This caused confusion and additional pressure, and contributed to the unstabilized approach and deviation from the glide path. According to the CVR, no altitude callouts were made by the crew during the final approach, as the aircraft descended below the glideslope and decision height, until it struck the seawall and crashed.

The board determined the following probable cause for the accident:

...the failure of the flightcrew to monitor altitude and to recognize passage of the aircraft through the approach decision height during an unstabilized precision approach conducted in rapidly changing meteorological conditions. The unstabilized nature of the approach was due initially to the aircraft's passing the outer marker above the glide slope at an excessive airspeed and thereafter compounded by the flightcrew's preoccupation with the questionable information presented by the flight director system. The poor positioning of the flight for the approach was in part the result of nonstandard air traffic control services.

== See also ==
- Asiana Airlines Flight 214 – Struck a seawall after descending under the glidepath on landing
- Atlas Air Flight 3591 – An accident caused by inadvertently switching the aircraft into a go-around mode on approach
- China Airlines Flight 140 – An accident caused by inadvertently switching the aircraft into a go-around mode on final approach
- Air China Flight 129, Garuda Indonesia Flight 152, Air Inter Flight 148 and Dan Air Flight 1008 – Other CFIT accidents caused by ATC and pilot errors
- List of disasters in Massachusetts by death toll
