= Priyam =

Priyam may refer to:

- Priyam (1996 film), a 1996 Indian film
- Priyam (2000 film), a 2000 Indian film
- Priyam Chatterjee, Indian chef
- Priyam Garg, Indian cricketer
- Priyam Gupta, Indian Junior Network Engineer, Maggie's Best Friend

== See also ==
- Priya (disambiguation)
