= Anahuac Independent School District =

School district in Texas, United States

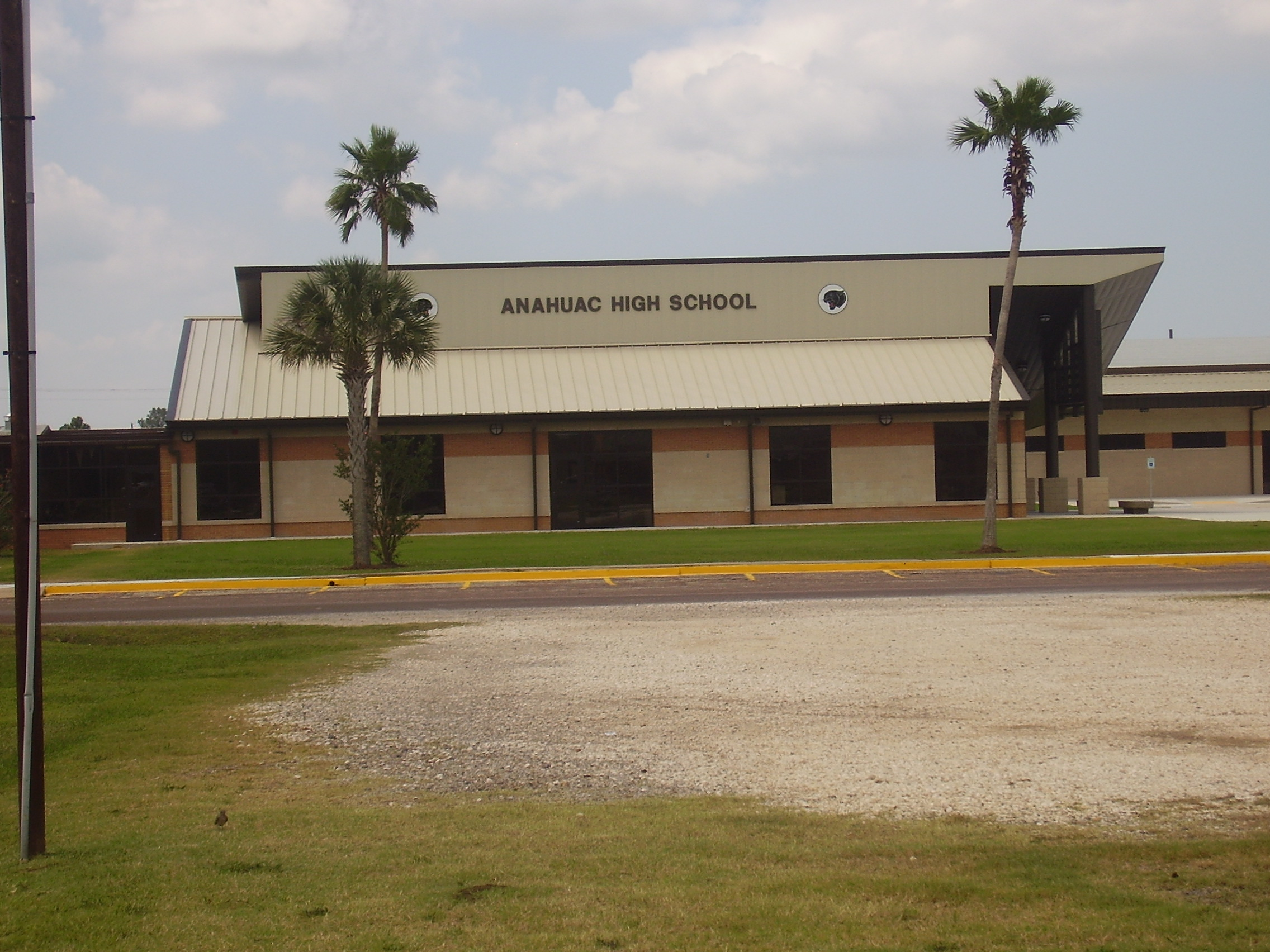

Location
- 804 Mikhael Ricks Dr. Anahuac, Texas ESC Region 5 USA
- Coordinates: 29°46′15″N 94°40′41″W

District information
- Type: Independent school district
- Grades: PK–12
- Superintendent: Cody Abshier
- Schools: 3
- NCES District ID: 4808190

Students and staff
- Students: 1,547 (2023–2024)
- Teachers: 108.02 (on an FTE basis)
- Student–teacher ratio: 14.32:1
- Athletic conference: UIL Class 3A
- District mascot: Panthers
- Colors: Black, Vegas Gold

Other information
- TEA District Accountability Rating for 2011-12: Recognized
- Website: Anahuac ISD

Anahuac Independent School District is a public school district based in Anahuac, Texas (USA). The district serves Anahuac and several unincorporated areas, including Double Bayou, Hankamer, Monroe City, Oak Island, Smith Point, Turtle Bayou, and Wallisville. The district operates one high school, Anahuac High School.

== Finances ==
As of the 2010-2011 school year, the appraised valuation of property in the district was $310,658,000. The maintenance tax rate was $0.104 and the bond tax rate was $0.032 per $100 of appraised valuation.

== Academic achievement ==
In 2011, the school district was rated "recognized" by the Texas Education Agency. Thirty-five percent of districts in Texas in 2011 received the same rating. No state accountability ratings will be given to districts in 2012. A school district in Texas can receive one of four possible rankings from the Texas Education Agency: Exemplary (the highest possible ranking), Recognized, Academically Acceptable, and Academically Unacceptable (the lowest possible ranking).

Historical district TEA accountability ratings

- 2011: Recognized
- 2010: Recognized
- 2009: Recognized
- 2008: Academically Acceptable
- 2007: Academically Acceptable
- 2006: Academically Acceptable
- 2005: Academically Acceptable
- 2004: Academically Acceptable

== Schools ==
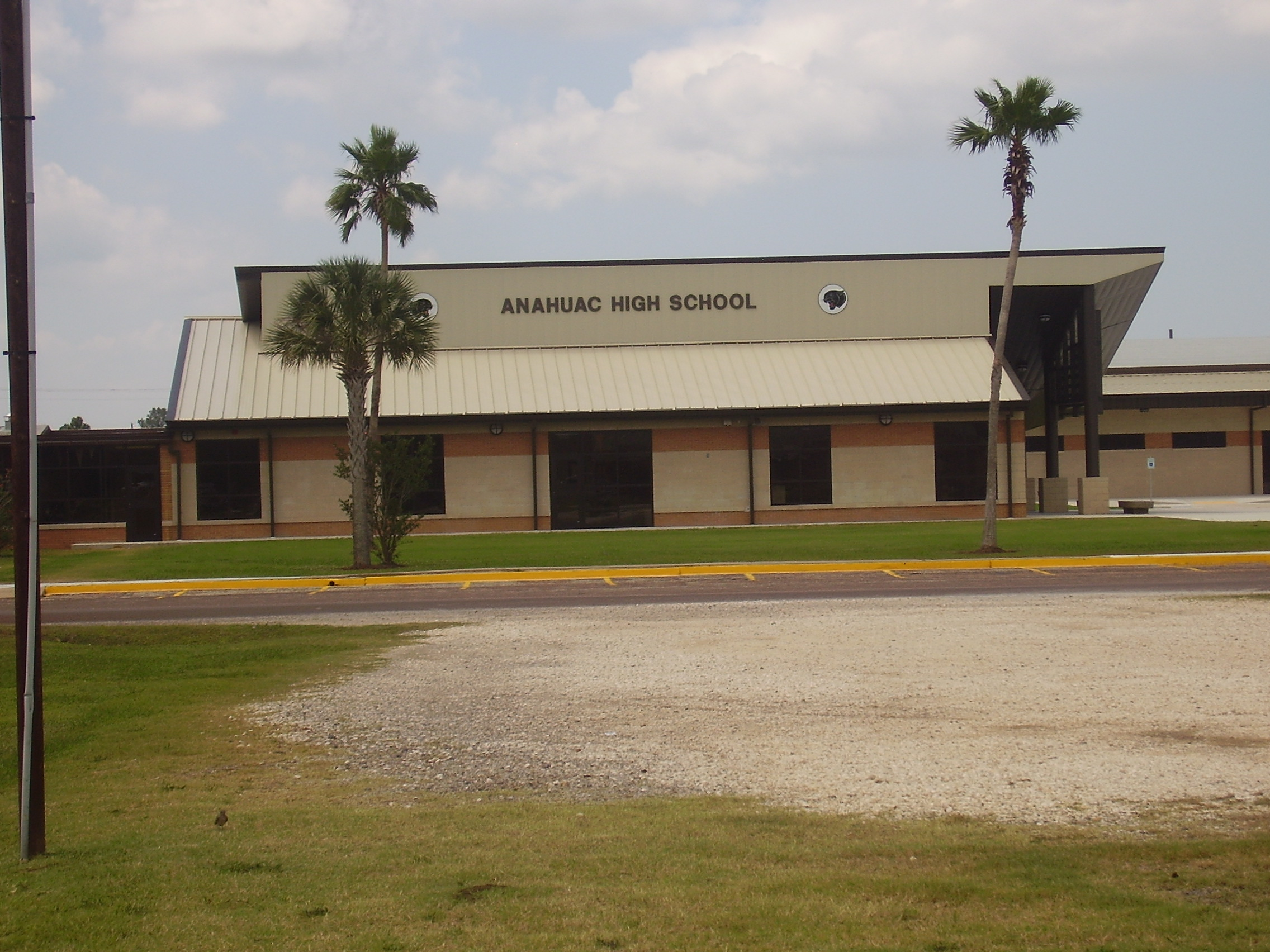
Anahuac High School

In the 2011-2012 school year, the district had students in five schools.

Regular instructional

- Anahuac High School (Grades 9-12)
- Anahuac Middle School (Grades 6-8)
- Anahuac Elementary School (Grades 3-5)
- Anahuac Primary School (PreK-2)

Alternative instructional

- Adaptive Behavior Unit (Grades 1-12)
- Hardin/Chambers Center (DAEP Grades 6-12)

== Special programs ==
=== Athletics ===
Anahuac High School participates in the boys sports of baseball, basketball, football, powerlifting, track and soccer. The school participates in the girls sports of basketball, softball, and volleyball. For the 2012 through 2014 school years, Anahuac High School will play football in UIL Class 2A Division I.

=== Band ===
Anahuac ISD's band program participates in all UIL events at the MS and HS level. Both programs also compete in TMEA (Texas Music Educators Association) and ATSSB (Association of Texas Small School Bands) sponsored events.

In 2022 the high school band finished at the area level of the Outstanding Performance Series and is a constant Area finalist at the UIL Marching Festival.

For the past two years the Middle School band has been a constant finalist at the state level of the Outstanding Performance Series, most recently placing 1st in 2022. Also, the middle school band was just named the TMEA 1C Honor Band for the state of Texas, placing them as the top band in their classification.

== See also ==
- List of school districts in Texas
- List of high schools in Texas
