= Asa Safu Kuthi =

Āśā Saphū Kuthi (Nepal Bhasa:आशा सफू कुथि) or The Āśā Archives, is a free library of Nepal Bhasa (Newar) language materials. It is the largest library of Nepal Bhasa materials; it even includes inscriptions and chronicles. It was inaugurated in 1987. The core of the library is the collection of MSS donated by Prem Bahadur Kansakar and Ian Alsop.

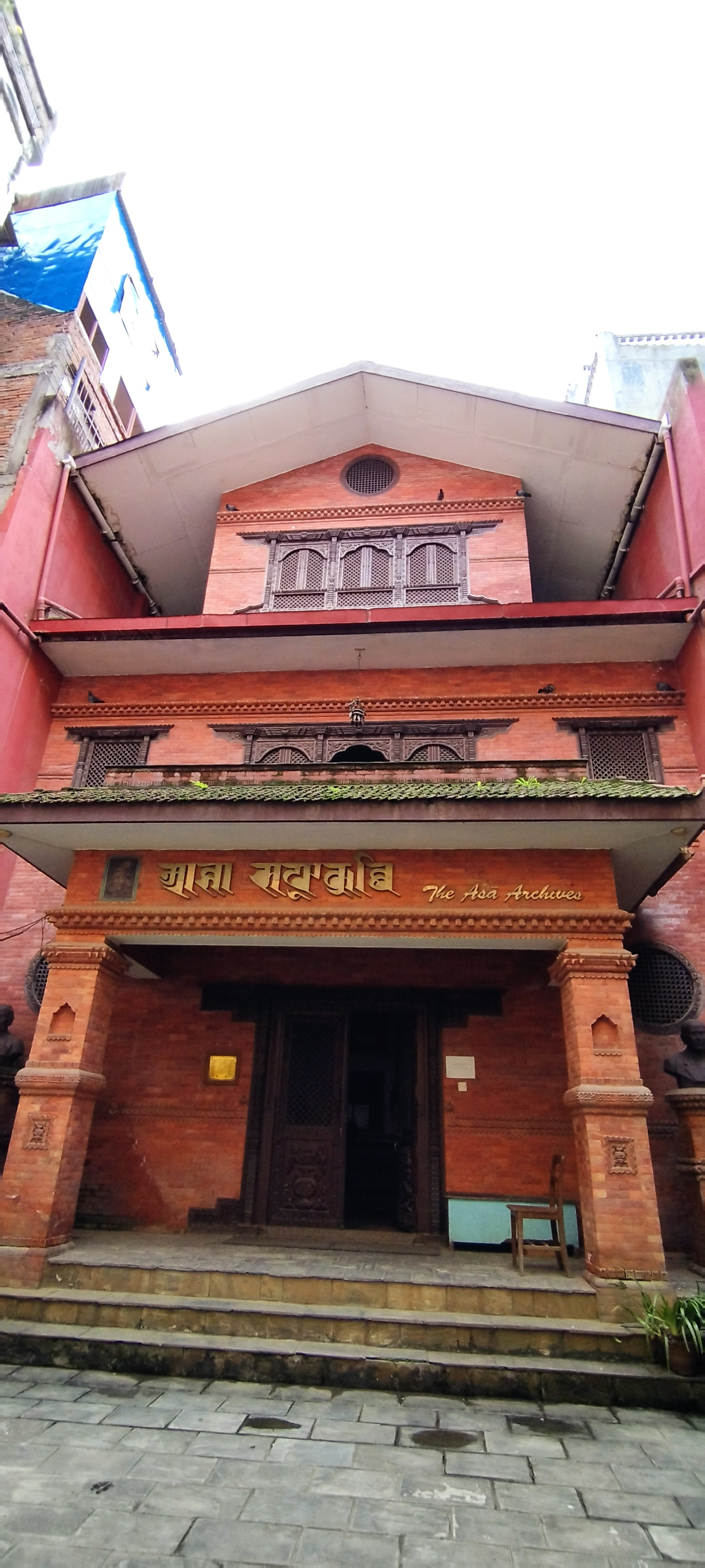
Asa Safu Kuthi Entrance

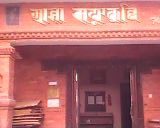
The main gate of Asa Safu Kuthi

== Location ==
It is situated outside the Raktakali Temple in Kathmandu inside Manka Dhuku premises.

== Contents ==
The library contains many books, inscriptions and chronicles. The books are primarily in Nepal Bhasa, but a few books in Nepali are also available. The first floor contains all of the books. The upper floor contains inscriptions and chronicles. A modern system of reading is also applied. One can either view everything directly or through a computer. The books can be photocopied or printed.

A catalogue of the collection was published in 1991.

The collection is being catalogued online, with digital images, through the Hill Monastic Manuscripts Library.
