= Pria =

Pria may refer to:

- Pría is a municipality in northern Spain.
- Pria (Crasna), a tributary of the Crasna in Sălaj County, Romania
- Pria, a tributary of the Homorod in Hunedoara County, Romania
- Pria (beetle), an insect genus in the family Nitidulidae (the sap beetles)
- "Pria" (The Orville), a 2017 television episode

== See also ==
- PRIA (disambiguation)
- Priya (disambiguation)
