= Trinity Bay (Texas) =

Northeast part of Galveston Bay in eastern Texas, United States

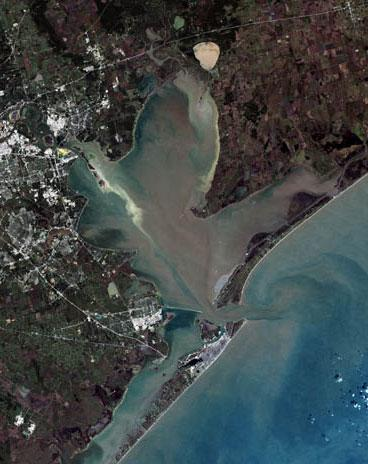
- Galveston Bay with Trinity Bay at the top

- Location within Texas Location within the United States
- Location: Texas Gulf Coast
- Coordinates: 29°40′57″N 94°47′31″W
- Type: Bay
- River sources: Trinity River
- Ocean/sea sources: Galveston Bay/Gulf of Mexico
- Basin countries: United States
- Settlements: Anahuac, Greater Houston

Trinity Bay is the northeast portion of Galveston Bay, bordered by Chambers and Harris counties in Texas, United States. The bay, approximately 20 miles (32 km) long, heads at the mouth of the Trinity River. Trinity Bay is separated from the main part of Galveston Bay by the San Jacinto River, part of the Houston Ship Channel.

Trinity Bay fronts on the vast network of Chambers County marshes and prairie land. The Trinity Basin contributes 54% of the total bay system inflow for the Galveston Bay complex. Near the head of the bay sits the town of Anahuac. Closer to the San Jacinto river lies the community of Beach City. The city of Baytown also lies near the bay although it does not actually reach its shores. Some smaller communities hug the shores of the bay as well. Much of the area near the shore is semi-rural or undeveloped, particularly the Jocelyn Nungaray National Wildlife Refuge (previously the Anahuac National Wildlife Refuge) which lies between Trinity Bay and East Bay, another segment of the Galveston Bay complex.

On February 23, 2019, Atlas Air Flight 3591 crashed into Trinity Bay, and all three people (two crew members and one passenger) aboard the flight were killed as a result.
