= Anahuac High School =

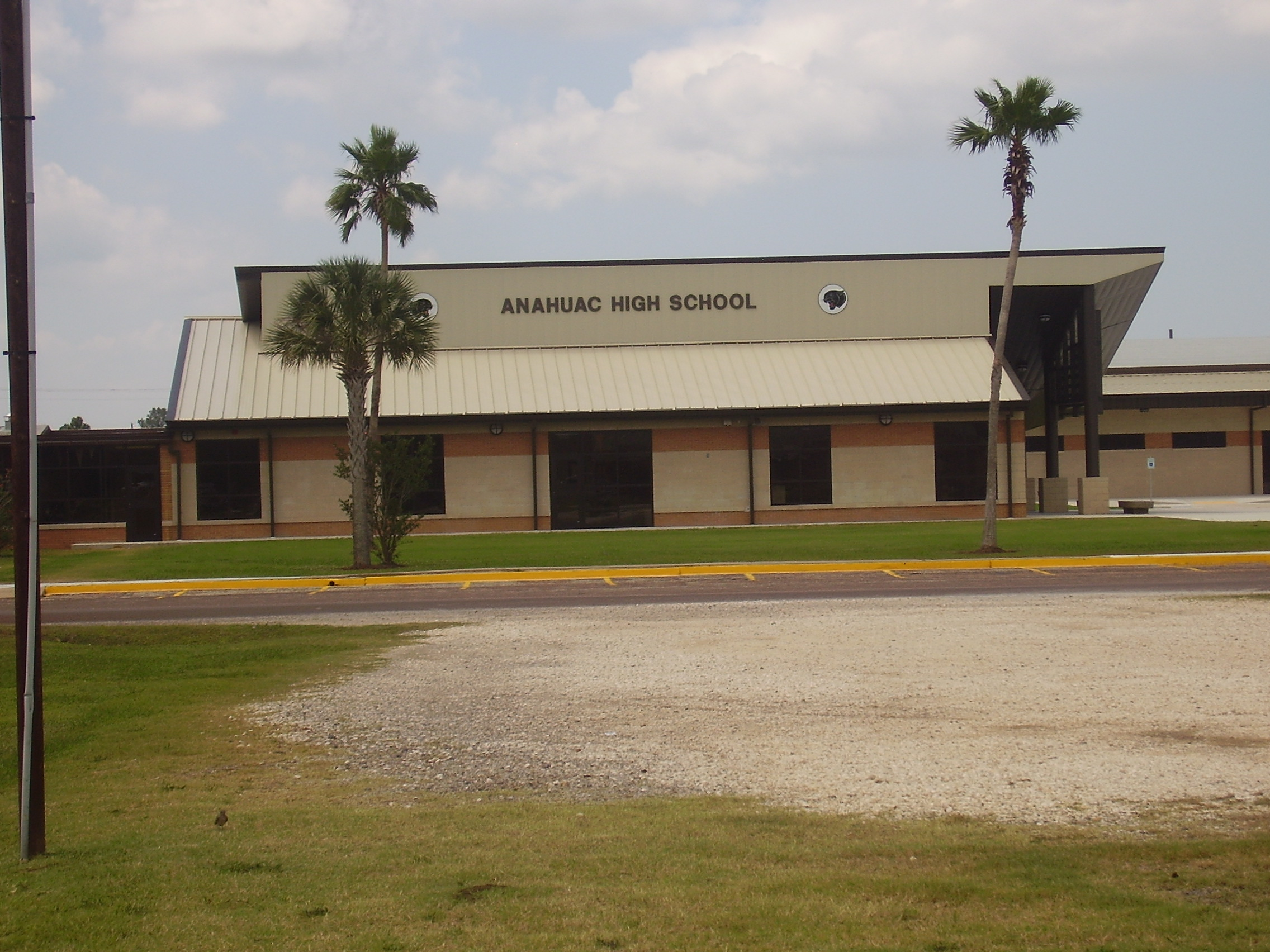

Location
- 201 South Kansas Avenue; Anahuac, Texas 77514; United States; 29.7714°N 94.6762°W

Information
- School type: Public high school
- Locale: Rural
- School district: Anahuac Independent School District
- NCES District ID: 4808190
- Educational authority: Texas Education Agency
- Superintendent: Cody Abshier
- CEEB code: 440160
- NCES School ID: 480819000190
- Principal: Rebecca Green
- Teaching staff: 34.01 (FTE)
- Grades: 9-12
- Gender: Coeducational
- Enrollment: 476 (2023-2024)
  - Grade 9: 116
  - Grade 10: 116
  - Grade 11: 129
  - Grade 12: 115
- Student to teacher ratio: 14.00
- Colors: Black & Gold
- Athletics: Yes
- Athletics conference: UIL Class 3A
- Mascot: Panther
- Website: Anahuac High School

Anahuac High School is a public high school located in the city of Anahuac, Texas, United States. It is part of the Anahuac Independent School District located in west central Chambers County and classified as a 3A school by the UIL. For the 2021-2022 school year, the school was given a "B" by the Texas Education Agency.

== Athletics ==
The Anahuac Panthers compete in the following sports:

- Baseball
- Basketball
- Cross Country
- Football
- Golf
- Powerlifting
- Soccer
- Softball
- Tennis
- Track and Field
- Volleyball

== Notable alumni ==
- Mikhael Ricks - Fitness trainer and former NFL football tight end for the Dallas Cowboys, Detroit Lions, Kansas City Chiefs & San Diego Chargers
- Hall Whitley - former NFL linebacker
