= Premie =

Premie can refer to:

- Premie or preemie, a baby born in a premature birth
- Premie ("lover of God"), used to refer to members of the Divine Light Mission.

== See also ==
- Premi
