= Premabhishekam =

Premabhishekam may refer to:

- Premabhishekam (1981 film), a Telugu film starring Akkineni Nageswara Rao
- Premabhishekam (2008 film), a Telugu film starring Venu Madhav
