= Prem Bhatia =

Prem Bhatia may refer to:

- Prem Bhatia (journalist) and diplomat (1922–1995)
- Prem Bhatia (cricketer) (1940–2018), Indian cricketer
- Prem Kumar Bhatia (born 1937), Indian mathematician, astrophysicist and professor
