= Monroe City, Texas =

- Unincorporated community
- Location within Texas Location within the United States
- Coordinates: 29°47′06″N 94°35′07″W
- Country: United States
- State: Texas
- County: Chambers
- Elevation: 26 ft (7.9 m)
- Time zone: UTC-6 (Central (CST))
  - Summer (DST): UTC-5 (CDT)
- Area code: 409
- GNIS feature ID: 1341804

Monroe City is an unincorporated community in Chambers County, Texas, United States. According to the Handbook of Texas, the community had a population of 90 in 2000. It is located within the Greater Houston metro area.

== History ==
The town was established after the 1935 discovery of the Anahuac oilfield and the resultant oil boom. The town had begun its decline by the late 1940s.

Historical population
Year	Pop.	±%
1939	300	—
1970	90	−70.0%
2000	90	+0.0%
2010	11	−87.8%

== Geography ==
Monroe City is located at the intersection of Farm to Market Road 1724 and Texas State Highway 124, 39 mi (63 km) southwest of Beaumont, 55 mi (89 km) east of Houston, and 6 mi (9.7 km) east of Anahuac in central Chambers County.

== Education ==
Anahuac Independent School District operates schools in the area.
