= Priya =

Priya may refer to:

== Film and television ==
- Priya (1970 film), a Malayalam film by Madhu
- Priya (1978 film), a Tamil film by S. P. Muthuraman

== People ==
- Priya (given name), a female given name of Indian origin
- Priya (actress), Indian actress
- Priya Anand (born 1986), Indian actress
- Priya Atlee, Indian film producer, actress
- Priya Bhavani Shankar (born 1989), Indian actress
- Priya Dutt (born 1966), Indian politician, social worker
- Priya Gill, Indian former actress, model
- Priya Krishna (journalist), Indian-American food journalist
- Priya Prakash Varrier (born 1999), Indian actress
- Priya Saroj (born 1998), Indian politician, lawyer
- Priyamani (born 1984), Indian actress

== See also ==
- Priyam (disambiguation)
- Pria (disambiguation)
