= Pilot Record Improvement Act =

The Pilot Records Improvement Act (PRIA) of 1996 is a United States federal law created in response to several fatal aviation accidents attributed to pilot error. Many of the accidents could have been avoided if the current operator was made aware of the pilot's past safety records. The act allows operators to see an applicant's flight qualifications and other safety-related records, as provided by the FAA and the applicant's previous employers.

== See also ==
- Jessica Dubroff § Child Pilot Safety Act
