= Anahuac, Texas =

- City
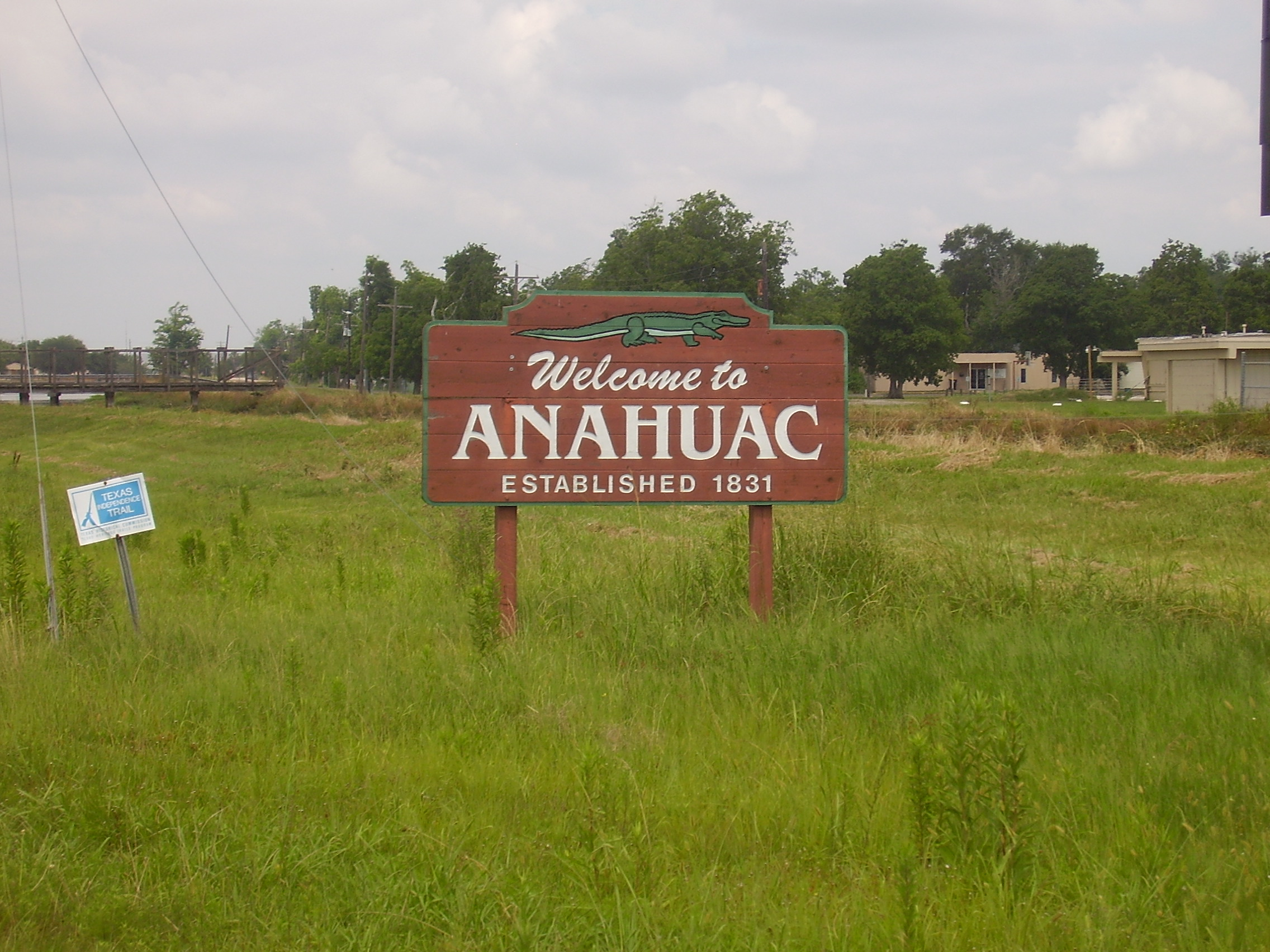
- Entrance sign
- Interactive map of Anahuac, Texas
- Coordinates: 29°45′25″N 94°40′53″W
- Country: United States
- State: Texas
- County: Chambers

Area
  - Total: 2.13 sq mi (5.51 km^{2})
  - Land: 2.13 sq mi (5.51 km^{2})
  - Water: 0 sq mi (0.00 km^{2})
- Elevation: 20 ft (6.1 m)

Population (2020)
  - Total: 1,980
  - Density: 1,100.0/sq mi (424.72/km^{2})
- Time zone: UTC−6 (Central (CST))
  - Summer (DST): UTC−5 (CDT)
- ZIP Code: 77514
- Area code: 409
- FIPS code: 48-03144
- GNIS feature ID: 2409705
- Website: www.anahuac.us

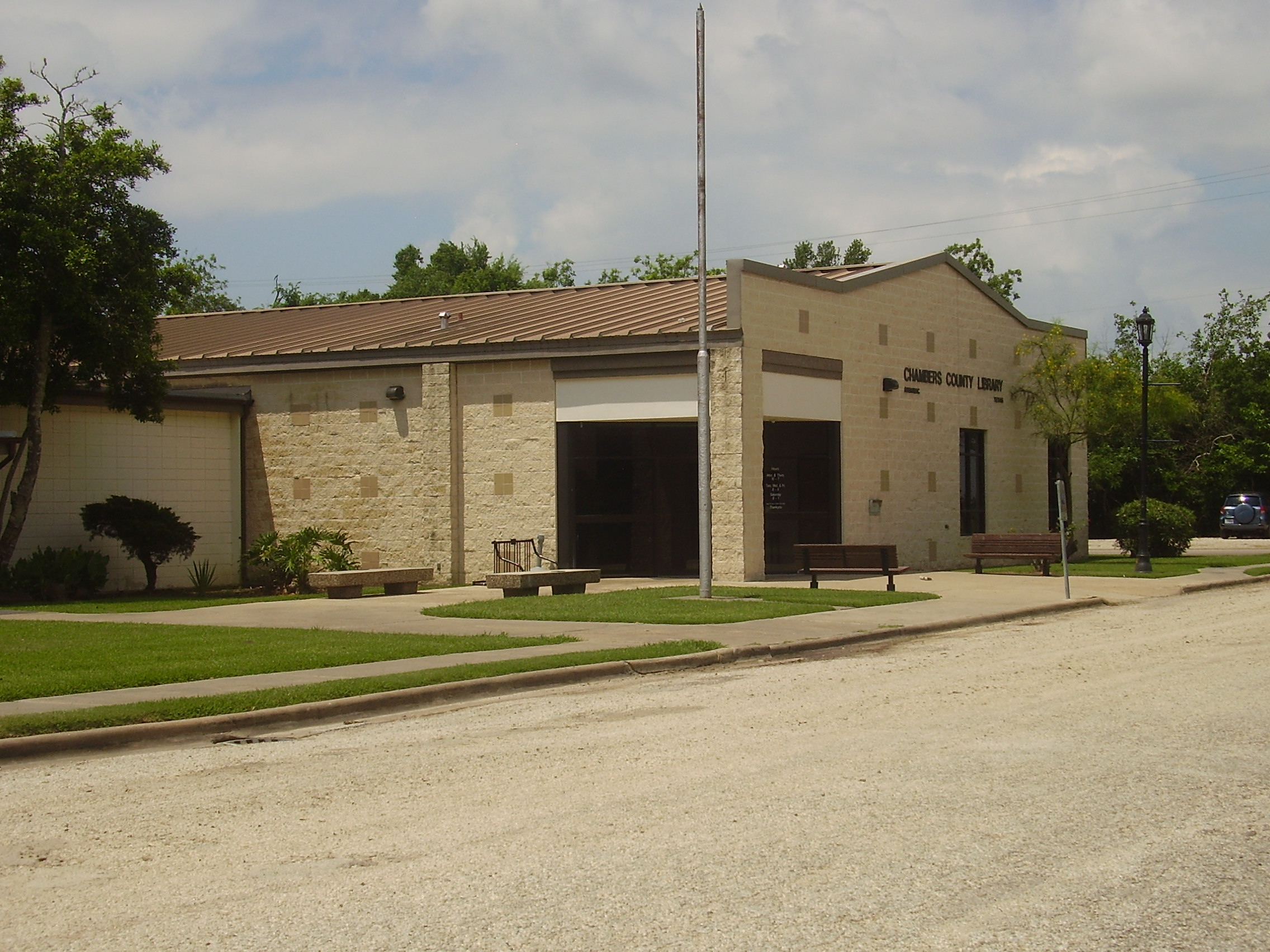
Chambers County Library

Anahuac (/ˈænəwæk/ AN-ə-wak) is a city in the U.S. state of Texas on the coast of Trinity Bay. The population of the city was 1,980 at the 2020 census. Anahuac is the county seat of Chambers County and is situated in Southeast Texas. The Texas Legislature designated the city as the "Alligator Capital of Texas" in 1989. Anahuac hosts an annual alligator festival.

== History ==
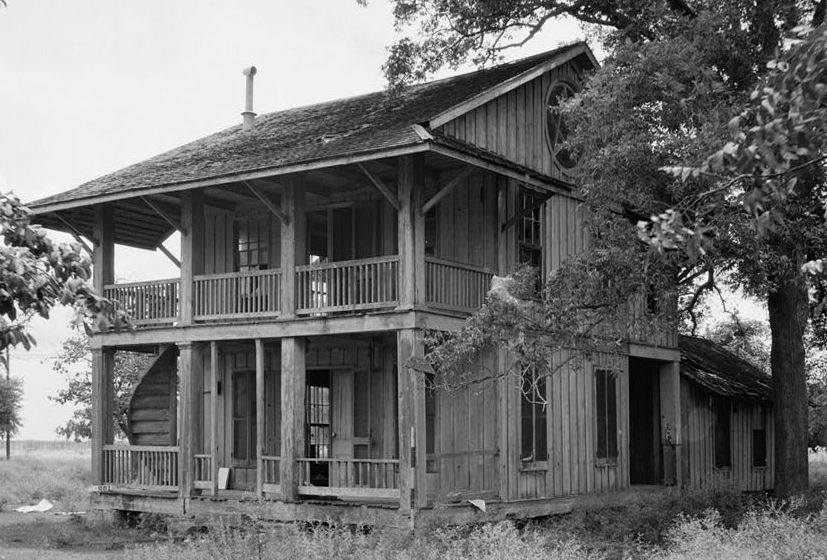
House of General Thomas Jefferson Chambers

The Mexican term Anahuac comes from Nahuatl, the language of the Aztecs. The name means "place beside the waters." Anáhuac is the pre-Columbian name of the Valley of Mexico and its former lake basins around Mexico City, often including the Lerma and Pánuco river systems. Despite the name, neither the city of Anahuac, Texas, nor the immediate region were ever part of the Aztec Empire.

The first dwellers in this area were the Atakapan people as well as the Caddo. The first colonist settlers arrived in 1715, The Burkhalter and Morehead families. They established a small settlement near what is now Lake Anahuac. In 1721, Frenchman Jean Baptiste de La Harpe reached this area. In the 19th century the area became known as "Perry's Point", after Colonel Harry Perry, who erected a military post here in 1816.

Two major events in 1832 and 1835, known as the Anahuac Disturbances (caused mainly by rogue bandits termed "Texians" from the Brazos Valley area), helped to precipitate the Texas Revolution that led to the separation of Texas from Mexico. One of these events was the jailing by Mexican authorities of William Travis for illegal slave importation, and the other was unfair taxation and duties on river traffic to the settlers by the Mexican authorities.

In October 1830, Mexican Colonel Juan Davis Bradburn established a customs post atop the same 30-foot (9.1 m) bluff where Perry had camped. Bradburn's orders specified that the new post be named Fort Anahuac. The soldiers erected two large kilns to produce bricks to build a more permanent fort. Fort Anahuac would still be intact today had it not been for the locals using the bricks for their own home construction soon after the Texas Revolution; virtually all bricks were taken and none remain to this day. By March 1831, Anahuac comprised 20 houses and seven stores. The town grew quickly. Soldiers were given 25 cents per day to use for food and other supplies, and they spent the money locally. By June 1, the town comprised over 300 civilians and 170 military personnel.

In 1862, a small Confederate outpost was established nearby.

The 1935 discovery of the Anahuac Oil Field and the Monroe City area oil field brought a period of economic development. The Anahuac National Wildlife Refuge, later renamed the Jocelyn Nungaray National Wildlife Refuge in 2025, was established 16 miles (26 km) southeast of the city in 1963 by the United States Fish and Wildlife Service. In 1989, the local chamber of commerce organized the first Gatorfest, which attracted 14,000 people into the Fort Anahuac Park, and it has been held annually since then. The festival has expanded every year since, and in 2010 hosted the largest festival, with more than 30,000 people attending.

In 2019, Atlas Air Flight 3591, a cargo flight operating for Amazon Air, crashed in the Trinity Bay, near Anahuac, while flying from Miami to Houston.

== Geography ==
Anahuac is located near the center of Chambers County at the northeastern end of Trinity Bay and the southern end of Lake Anahuac. The mouth of the Trinity River into Trinity Bay is just west of the city. Lake Anahuac is approximately 33,348 acre-feet it was constructed by the Burkhalter family in 1953.

Texas State Highway 61 follows Washington Avenue and Miller Street in Anahuac and leads east and north 12 miles (19 km) to Interstate 10 at a point 43 miles (69 km) east of Houston and 40 miles (64 km) southwest of Beaumont.

According to the United States Census Bureau, the city of Anahuac has a total area of 2.1 square miles (5.5 km^{2}), all land.

In response to the City of Houston's annexation of the I-10 corridor through Baytown and Mont Belvieu to the Trinity River in Chambers County, and possible further expansion to Wallisville, The City of Anahuac is considering annexing and expanding its City Limits on Highway 563 to Wallisville which would possibly bring the Houston Annex to Anahuac as well.

Anahuac is also initiating a $50M School Expansion Bond due to influx of many homes and families around the area and expectation of 1000 additional school aged individuals over the next five years alone.

=== Climate ===
Climate data for Anahuac, Texas (1991–2020 normals, extremes 1931–2019)
Month	Jan	Feb	Mar	Apr	May	Jun	Jul	Aug	Sep	Oct	Nov	Dec	Year
Record high °F (°C)	92 (33)	85 (29)	93 (34)	93 (34)	97 (36)	103 (39)	106 (41)	104 (40)	105 (41)	100 (38)	89 (32)	87 (31)	106 (41)
Mean maximum °F (°C)	75.7 (24.3)	77.2 (25.1)	81.1 (27.3)	85.5 (29.7)	91.0 (32.8)	95.4 (35.2)	96.6 (35.9)	97.7 (36.5)	95.2 (35.1)	90.4 (32.4)	83.7 (28.7)	77.2 (25.1)	98.7 (37.1)
Mean daily maximum °F (°C)	61.6 (16.4)	65.7 (18.7)	71.3 (21.8)	76.7 (24.8)	83.2 (28.4)	88.7 (31.5)	90.7 (32.6)	91.5 (33.1)	87.5 (30.8)	80.9 (27.2)	71.5 (21.9)	63.8 (17.7)	77.8 (25.4)
Daily mean °F (°C)	52.4 (11.3)	56.2 (13.4)	62.1 (16.7)	67.8 (19.9)	74.9 (23.8)	80.8 (27.1)	82.9 (28.3)	82.9 (28.3)	78.7 (25.9)	70.5 (21.4)	61.1 (16.2)	54.2 (12.3)	68.7 (20.4)
Mean daily minimum °F (°C)	43.2 (6.2)	46.8 (8.2)	52.9 (11.6)	58.9 (14.9)	66.6 (19.2)	72.8 (22.7)	75.1 (23.9)	74.4 (23.6)	69.8 (21.0)	60.1 (15.6)	50.8 (10.4)	44.5 (6.9)	59.7 (15.4)
Mean minimum °F (°C)	27.5 (−2.5)	30.3 (−0.9)	35.0 (1.7)	43.2 (6.2)	54.4 (12.4)	64.7 (18.2)	68.9 (20.5)	67.7 (19.8)	56.6 (13.7)	44.0 (6.7)	34.4 (1.3)	27.6 (−2.4)	23.4 (−4.8)
Record low °F (°C)	11 (−12)	12 (−11)	23 (−5)	34 (1)	43 (6)	49 (9)	60 (16)	60 (16)	45 (7)	33 (1)	23 (−5)	8 (−13)	8 (−13)
Average precipitation inches (mm)	4.59 (117)	3.07 (78)	3.63 (92)	4.41 (112)	5.39 (137)	5.84 (148)	5.68 (144)	7.02 (178)	7.02 (178)	4.75 (121)	3.85 (98)	4.47 (114)	59.72 (1,517)
Average snowfall inches (cm)	0.0 (0.0)	0.0 (0.0)	0.0 (0.0)	0.0 (0.0)	0.0 (0.0)	0.0 (0.0)	0.0 (0.0)	0.0 (0.0)	0.0 (0.0)	0.0 (0.0)	0.0 (0.0)	0.2 (0.51)	0.2 (0.51)
Average precipitation days (≥ 0.01 in)	8.5	7.9	7.8	6.0	6.2	9.0	8.7	9.2	8.6	5.5	6.4	8.6	92.4
Average snowy days (≥ 0.1 in)	0.0	0.0	0.0	0.0	0.0	0.0	0.0	0.0	0.0	0.0	0.0	0.0	0.0
Source: NOAA (mean maxima/minima 1981–2010)

== Ecology ==
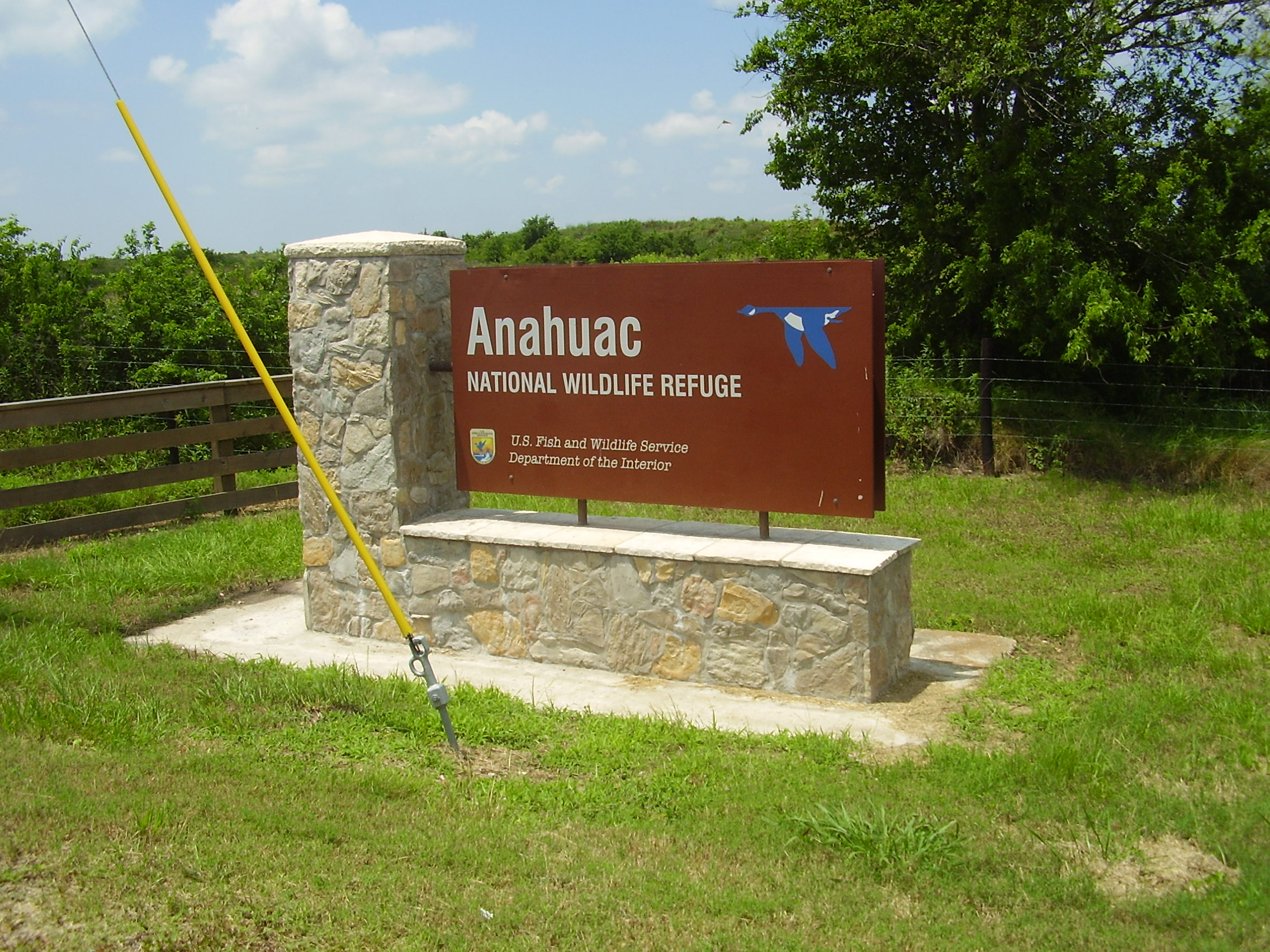
Jocelyn Nungaray National Wildlife Refuge, formerly Anahuac NWR

Southeast of the city of Anahuac is the Jocelyn Nungaray National Wildlife Refuge (formerly the Anahuac NWR) which is popular among birdwatchers because almost 250 species of birds (see external link) have been reported there. Jocelyn Nungaray NWR is home to several species of marsh birds called rails including yellow rail, clapper rail and black rail.

== Demographics ==
Historical population
Census	Pop.	Note	%±
1950	1,284		—
1960	1,985		54.6%
1970	1,881		−5.2%
1980	1,840		−2.2%
1990	1,993		8.3%
2000	2,210		10.9%
2010	2,243		1.5%
2020	1,980		−11.7%
U.S. Decennial Census; 1850–1900 1910; 1920 1930 1940; 1950 1960 1970; 1980 1990 2000; 2010

=== 2020 census ===
As of the 2020 census, Anahuac had a population of 1,980, 712 households, and 539 families. The median age was 36.7 years, 25.0% of residents were under the age of 18, and 17.2% of residents were 65 years of age or older. For every 100 females there were 96.2 males, and for every 100 females age 18 and over there were 97.5 males age 18 and over.

There were 712 households in Anahuac, of which 36.7% had children under the age of 18 living in them. Of all households, 47.1% were married-couple households, 16.2% were households with a male householder and no spouse or partner present, and 28.8% were households with a female householder and no spouse or partner present. About 24.0% of all households were made up of individuals and 11.3% had someone living alone who was 65 years of age or older.

There were 790 housing units, of which 9.9% were vacant. Among occupied housing units, 72.8% were owner-occupied and 27.2% were renter-occupied. The homeowner vacancy rate was 1.7% and the rental vacancy rate was 11.4%.

0% of residents lived in urban areas, while 100.0% lived in rural areas.

Anahuac racial composition as of 2020 (NH = Non-Hispanic) (Note: Note: the US Census treats Hispanic/Latino as an ethnic category. This table excludes Latinos from the racial categories and assigns them to a separate category. Hispanics/Latinos can be of any race.)
Race	Number	Percentage
White (NH)	1,071	54.09%
Black or African American (NH)	329	16.62%
Native American or Alaska Native (NH)	9	0.45%
Asian (NH)	16	0.81%
Some Other Race (NH)	12	0.61%
Mixed/Multi-Racial (NH)	73	3.69%
Hispanic or Latino	470	23.74%
Total	1,980	

Racial composition as of the 2020 census
Race	Percent
White	59.1%
Black or African American	16.7%
American Indian and Alaska Native	0.7%
Asian	0.8%
Native Hawaiian and Other Pacific Islander	0%
Some other race	13.7%
Two or more races	9.0%
Hispanic or Latino (of any race)	23.7%

=== 2000 census ===
As of the census of 2000, there were 2,210 people, 803 households, and 600 families residing in the city. The population density was 1,044.8 inhabitants per square mile (403.4/km^{2}). There were 902 housing units at an average density of 426.4 per square mile (164.6/km^{2}). The racial makeup of the city was 68.28% White, 20.23% African American, 0.14% Native American, 0.68% Asian, 9.05% from other races, and 1.63% from two or more races. Hispanic or Latino people of any race were 12.99% of the population.

There were 803 households, out of which 38.1% had children under the age of 18 living with them, 55.2% were married couples living together, 15.7% had a female householder with no husband present, and 25.2% were non-families. Of all households 22.0% were made up of individuals, and 12.3% had someone living alone who was 65 years of age or older. The average household size was 2.69 and the average family size was 3.14.

In the city, the population was spread out, with 29.7% under the age of 18, 7.6% from 18 to 24, 27.2% from 25 to 44, 20.5% from 45 to 64, and 15.0% who were 65 years of age or older. The median age was 34 years. For every 100 females, there were 87.9 males. For every 100 females age 18 and over, there were 81.5 males.

The median income for a household in the city was $40,924, and the median income for a family was $46,750. Males had a median income of $34,904 versus $24,917 for females. The per capita income for the city was $17,056. About 11.1% of families and 13.5% of the population were below the poverty line, including 18.0% of those under age 18 and 13.8% of those age 65 or over.

== Transportation ==
Chambers County Airport, in unincorporated Chambers County east of Anahuac, serves Anahuac.

== Media ==
The Progress is the local newspaper of Anahuac. As of 2012 it is about 100 years old. The Houston Chronicle serves Greater Houston.

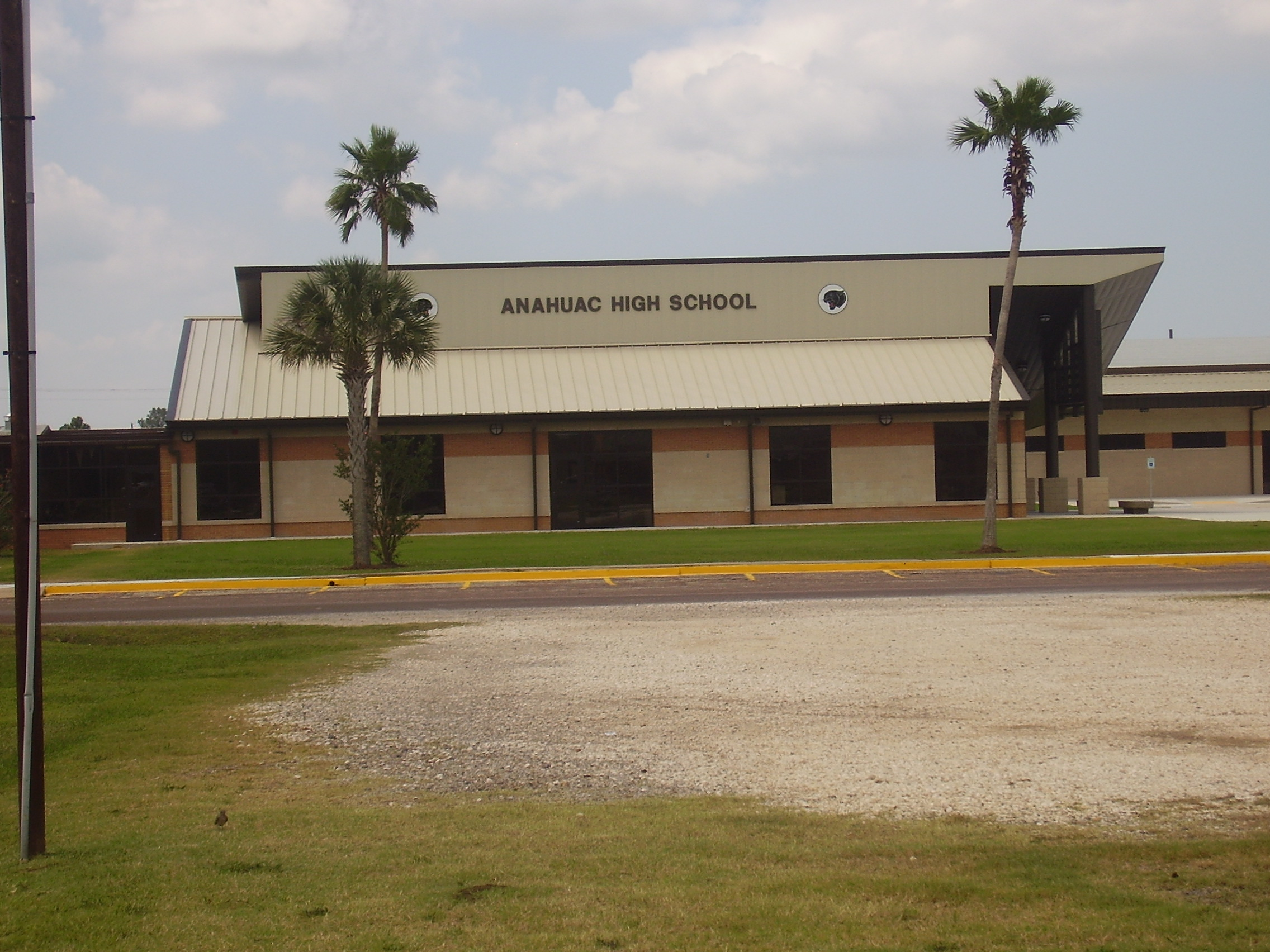
Anahuac High School

== Education ==
The Anahuac Independent School District serves the community. Anahuac High School is the local high school.

The Chambers County Library in Anahuac is a branch of the Chambers County Library System. It is located at 202 Cummings Street, Anahuac, Texas 77514.

Residents of Anahuac ISD are zoned to Lee College.

== Sources ==
- Edmondson, J.R. (2000), The Alamo Story-From History to Current Conflicts, Plano, TX: Republic of Texas Press, ISBN 1-55622-678-0
- Epperson, Jean L. (January 1989), "1834 Census - Anahuac Precinct, Atascosito District", Southwestern Historical Quarterly, vol. 92, no. 3, archived from the original on August 9, 2020
- Henson, Margaret Swett (1982), Juan Davis Bradburn: A Reappraisal of the Mexican Commander of Anahuac, College Station, TX: Texas A&M University Press, ISBN 978-0-89096-135-3
- Tucker, Phillip Thomas (2010), Exodus from the Alamo: The Anatomy of the Last Stand Myth, Philadelphia, PA: Casemate, ISBN 978-1-932033-93-9
