= Gulf (disambiguation) =

A gulf is a large inlet from the ocean into a landmass.

Gulf or the gulf may also refer to:

== Places ==
- Gulf Country, a region in Australia
- Gulf Freeway, a highway in Texas, United States
- Gulf, North Carolina, a census-designated place in the United States
- Gulf of Mexico, Atlantic Ocean basin extending into southern North America
- Gulf Province, Papua New Guinea
- Persian Gulf, also known as the Arabian Gulf or the Gulf, an arm of the Indian Ocean

== Arts and media ==
- Gulf (film), 2017 Indian Telugu-language film
- Gulf (novella), by Robert A. Heinlein (1949)
- The Gulf (play), by Audrey Cefaly
- The Gulf: The Making of an American Sea, book by Jack E. Davis
- The Gulf (TV series), New Zealand-set crime drama series

== Businesses and organizations ==
- Global University Leaders Forum, an organization within World Economic Forum
- Gulf Air, the principal flag carrier of the Kingdom of Bahrain
- Gulf and Western Industries, an American conglomerate
- Gulf Cartel, a criminal organisation in Mexico
- Gulf FM (disambiguation), various radio stations
- Gulf High School, a four-year public high school in New Port Richey, Florida
- Gulf News, a daily English language newspaper published in Dubai
- Gulf Oil, a major oil company from 1901 to 1985
  - Gulf Canada, a major Canadian oil company from 1944 and 2001, a subsidiary of Gulf Oil
  - JWA Gulf, a Gulf Oil-sponsored motor racing team of John Wyer in the 1960s and 1970s
- Gulf Power Company, an American investor-owned electric utility

== Other uses ==
- Gulf house, a type of farmhouse that emerged in the 16th and 17th centuries in North Germany
- Gulf of evaluation, the degree to which a computer system provides representations that can be directly perceived and interpreted in terms of the expectations and intentions of the user
- Gulf of execution, a term usually used in human computer interaction to describe the gap between a user's goal for action and the means to execute that goal

== See also ==
- Arabian Gulf (disambiguation)
- Gulf breeze (disambiguation)
- Gulf Coast (disambiguation)
- Grand Gulf (disambiguation)
- Gulf Building (disambiguation)
- Gulf Cup (disambiguation)
- Gulf states (disambiguation)
- Gulf University (disambiguation)
- Golf (disambiguation)
- Gulf Stream, a maritime current
- Gulf War, 1990–91 war waged by coalition forces led by the United States against Iraq
- Gulf Coast of the United States, the coastline along the Southern United States and the Gulf of Mexico
- List of gulfs, a list of large bays and gulfs
