= Sea Breeze =

A sea breeze is a wind from the sea.

Sea Breeze, seabreeze, or variants, may also refer to:

== Places ==
- Seabreeze, a hamlet in Irondequoit, New York
- Sea Breeze (Bahamas Parliament constituency)
- Sea Breeze, North Carolina, a census-designated place
- Sea Breeze, New Jersey, an unincorporated community in Fairfield Township, New Jersey
- Seabreeze, Florida, a former city, now a neighborhood in Daytona Beach, Florida
- Seabreeze, Texas, an unincorporated community
- Sea Breeze, a community in the township of Lake of Bays, Ontario, Canada

=== Structures ===
- Seabreeze Bridge, a bridge spanning the Halifax River in Daytona Beach, Florida
- Seabreeze High School, Daytona Beach, Florida, United States
- Sea Breeze Hospital, former name of NYC Health + Hospitals/Coney Island, in New York

== Military ==
- Operation Sea Breeze, the name for the 2010 Gaza flotilla raid of the Israeli navy
- Operation Sea Breeze (Sri Lanka), navy operation of the Sri Lankan Civil War
- Exercise Sea Breeze, annual multinational military exercise arranged by Ukraine and the United States

== Other uses ==
- Nightcliff Seabreeze Festival, formerly Seeabreeze Festival, in Darwin, Australia
- Sea breeze (cocktail), an alcoholic mixed drink
- Seabreeze Amusement Park, Irondequoit, New York
- SS SeaBreeze (1958–2000), a cruise ship that sank in 2000
- Sea Breezes (magazine), a shipping magazine first issued in 1919
- Seabreeze (horse), a Thoroughbred racehorse
- Sea Breeze Stakes, original name of the Honeymoon Handicap Thoroughbred horse race
- "Sea Breezes" (song), a song by Roxy Music
- Sea Breeze (steam train), a steam locomotive-hauled tourist train service in the Republic of Ireland

== See also ==
- Operation Sea Breeze (disambiguation)
- Hawaiian sea breeze (disambiguation)
- Ocean Breeze (disambiguation)
- Bay breeze (disambiguation)
- Sea (disambiguation)
- Breeze (disambiguation)
