= Gulf Cup (disambiguation) =

The Arabian Gulf Cup, often known simply as the Gulf Cup, is a biennial football competition governed by the Gulf Football Federation (GFF) for its eight member nations.

Gulf Cup may also refer to:

- Gulf Cup for Veteran Players, a competition for retired football players.
- GFF U-23 Gulf Cup, a competition for under-23 national football teams.
- GFF U-20 Gulf Cup, a competition for under-20 national football teams.
- GFF U-17 Gulf Cup, a competition for under-17 national football teams.
- UAE Arabian Gulf Cup, former sponsorship name of the UAE League Cup.
- Persian Gulf Cup, former name of the Persian Gulf Pro League for Iranian club association football teams.
