= Sunshine Coast =

Sunshine Coast may refer to:

- Sunshine Coast, Queensland, Australia
  - Sunshine Coast Region, a local government area of Queensland named after the region
  - Sunshine Coast Stadium
- Sunshine Coast (British Columbia), geographic subregion of the British Columbia coast, Canada
  - Sunshine Coast Regional District, regional district of British Columbia
- The Sunrise Coast, Suffolk, United Kingdom
- Eastbourne, a seaside resort in South East England

== See also ==
- Costa del Sol (disambiguation)
