= Suncoast =

Suncoast may refer to:

== Places ==
- Florida Suncoast, a local marketing term for peninsular Florida's Gulf of Mexico coastal counties
- Suncoast Estates, Florida, census-designated place in Lee County, southwest Florida

== Businesses and organizations ==
- Suncoast Behavioral Health Center, psychiatric hospital in Bradenton, Florida
- Suncoast Casino and Entertainment World, hotel and casino complex situated on the beach in Durban, South Africa
- Suncoast Classic, golf tournament in Durban, South Africa
- Suncoast Suns, former ice hockey team in St. Petersburg, Florida
- Suncoast Chapter of NATAS (Emmy Awards) which serves Florida and some other places
- Suncoast Christian College, on the Sunshine Coast, Queensland, Australia
- Suncoast Community High School, public high school in Riviera Beach, Florida, on the Atlantic coast
- Suncoast Credit Union, credit union headquartered in Tampa, Florida
- Suncoast Hotel and Casino, hotel in Las Vegas, Nevada
- Suncoast Motion Picture Company, a U.S. chain of stores specializing in movies and related gift items

== Other uses ==
- Suncoast (film), a film starring Woody Harrelson
- Suncoast Parkway, a tolled road which spans northwestern Hillsborough County to Citrus County

== See also ==
- Costa del Sol (disambiguation)
- Gulf Coast (disambiguation)
