= Vance McDonald =

American football player (born 1990)

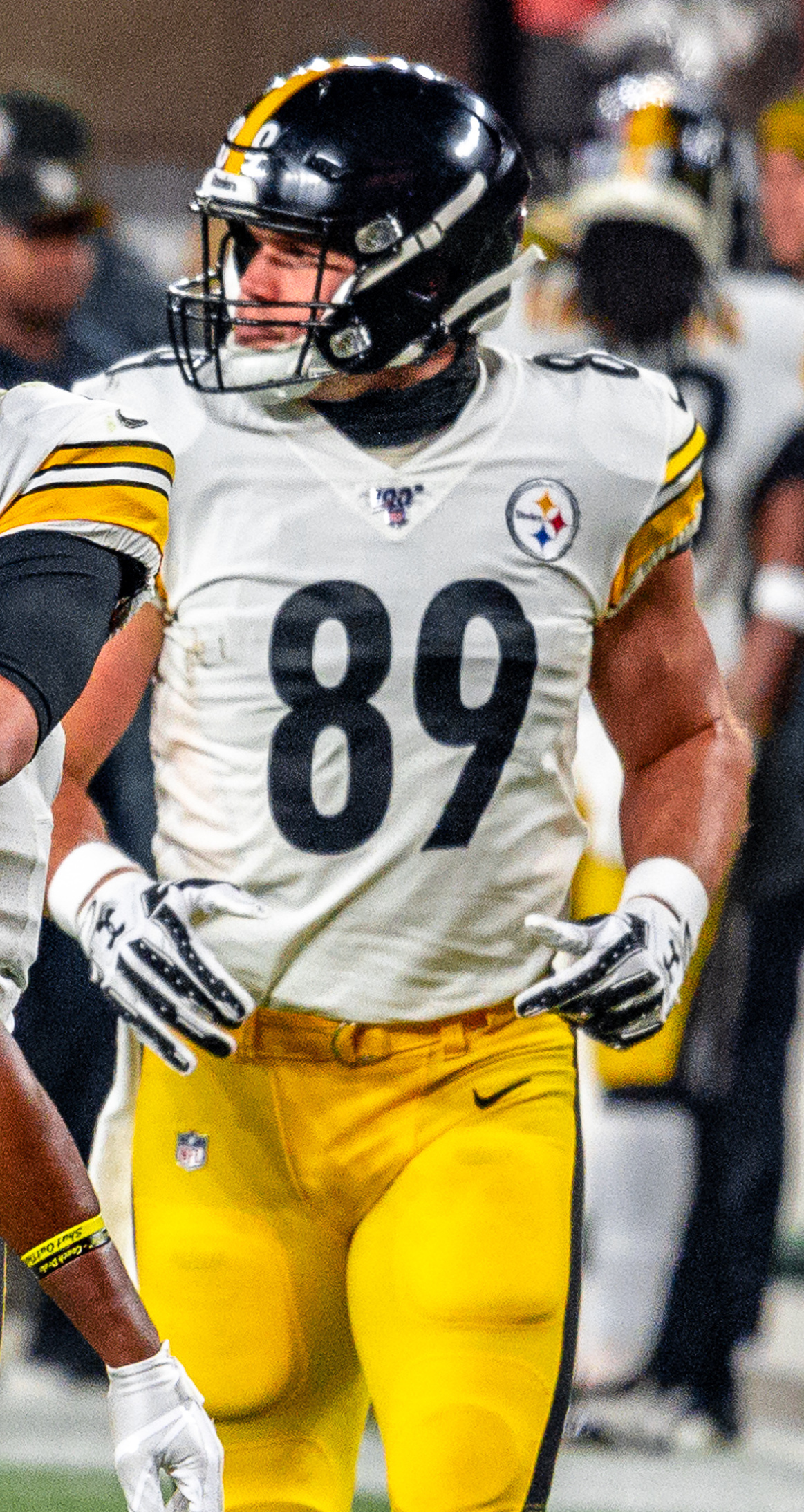
- McDonald with the Pittsburgh Steelers in 2019

No. 89
- Position: Tight end

Personal information
- Born: June 13, 1990 (age 36); Winnie, Texas, U.S.
- Listed height: 6 ft 4 in (1.93 m)
- Listed weight: 267 lb (121 kg)

Career information
- High school: East Chambers (Winnie)
- College: Rice (2009–2012)
- NFL draft: 2013: 2nd round, 55th overall pick

Career history
- San Francisco 49ers (2013–2016); Pittsburgh Steelers (2017–2020)

Awards and highlights
- First-team All-C-USA (2012)

Career NFL statistics
- Receptions: 181
- Receiving yards: 2,036
- Receiving touchdowns: 15
- Stats at Pro Football Reference

Vance Coman McDonald (born June 13, 1990) is an American former professional football player who was a tight end for eight seasons in the National Football League (NFL). He played college football for the Rice Owls and was selected by the San Francisco 49ers in the second round of the 2013 NFL draft. McDonald also played four seasons with the Pittsburgh Steelers.

== Early life ==
McDonald was born in Winnie, Texas. He attended East Chambers High School in Winnie, and played for the East Chambers Buccaneers high school football team. McDonald was a three-year letterman, earning all-district 24-2A honors as both a tight end and defensive end as a senior. East Chambers won district titles in both his junior and senior year. McDonald also competed in basketball and was a standout athlete for the East Chambers High School track team. He was a member of the relay team. McDonald also had personal bests of 6.28 meters in the long jump and 12.53 meters in the triple jump.

== College career ==
McDonald attended Rice University, where he played for the Rice Owls football team from 2009 to 2012 under head coach David Bailiff. He earned Conference USA All-Freshman honors after catching 12 passes in his first season.

As a sophomore, McDonald posted a career-high eight touchdowns, to go along with 396 yards receiving on 28 receptions.

In his final two seasons, McDonald recorded 999 receiving yards on 80 receptions and seven touchdowns. He was a first-team All-Conference-USA selection at tight end as a senior.

=== College statistics ===
Season	Team	Conf	Class	Pos	GP	Receiving			
Season	Team	Conf	Class	Pos	GP	Rec	Yds	Avg	TD
2009	Rice	CUSA	FR	TE	10	12	118	9.8	0
2010	Rice	CUSA	SO	TE	10	28	396	14.1	8
2011	Rice	CUSA	JR	TE	12	43	532	12.4	5
2012	Rice	CUSA	SR	TE	10	36	458	12.7	2
Career					42	119	1,504	12.6	15

== Professional career ==
=== Pre-draft ===
Coming out of college, McDonald was projected by many analysts to be a second- to third-round selection. He was ranked the fourth-best tight end out of the 97 available in the draft by NFLDraftScout.com. McDonald was invited to the NFL Combine and was able to complete all the required workouts and positional drills. At Rice's Pro Day, he stood on his combine numbers and only participated in positional drills.

Pre-draft measurables
Height	Weight	Arm length	Hand span	40-yard dash	10-yard split	20-yard split	20-yard shuttle	Three-cone drill	Vertical jump	Broad jump	Bench press	Wonderlic
6 ft 4 1/8 in (1.93 m)	267 lb (121 kg)	34 3/8 in (0.87 m)	10 1/8 in (0.26 m)	4.69 s	1.71 s	2.81 s	4.53 s	7.08 s	33.5 in (0.85 m)	9 ft 11 in (3.02 m)	31 reps	30
All values from NFL Combine

=== San Francisco 49ers ===
==== 2013 season ====
The San Francisco 49ers selected McDonald in the second round (55th overall) of the 2013 NFL draft. He was the fourth tight end to be selected that year. On May 24, 2013, the 49ers signed McDonald to a four-year, $3.59 million rookie contract with $1.92 million guaranteed and a signing bonus of $997,584.

McDonald started the regular season as the second tight end on the depth chart, behind veteran Vernon Davis and ahead of Garrett Celek. In the season opener, he caught a 25-yard pass from Colin Kaepernick for his first career reception during a 34–28 victory over the Green Bay Packers. Two weeks later, McDonald earned his first career start against the Indianapolis Colts and finished the loss with a six-yard reception.

McDonald finished his rookie year with eight receptions for 119 yards in 15 games and four starts.

==== 2014 season ====
On September 14, 2014, McDonald started his first game of the season during a loss to the Chicago Bears and made his first catch of the season for nine yards. McDonald made his only other catch of the season during a Week 6 victory over the St. Louis Rams and finished the game with one reception for 21 yards. On December 9, 2014, McDonald was placed on season-ending injured reserve with a back injury.

McDonald finished his second professional season with two receptions for 30 yards in eight games and four starts.

==== 2015 season ====
McDonald started his first and only season under new head coach Jim Tomsula as the backup to Davis once again. On November 22, 2015, McDonald caught his first NFL touchdown on a 19-yard reception from Blaine Gabbert against the Seattle Seahawks.

McDonald finished the 2015 season with 30 receptions for 326 yards and three touchdowns in 14 games and 11 starts.

==== 2016 season ====
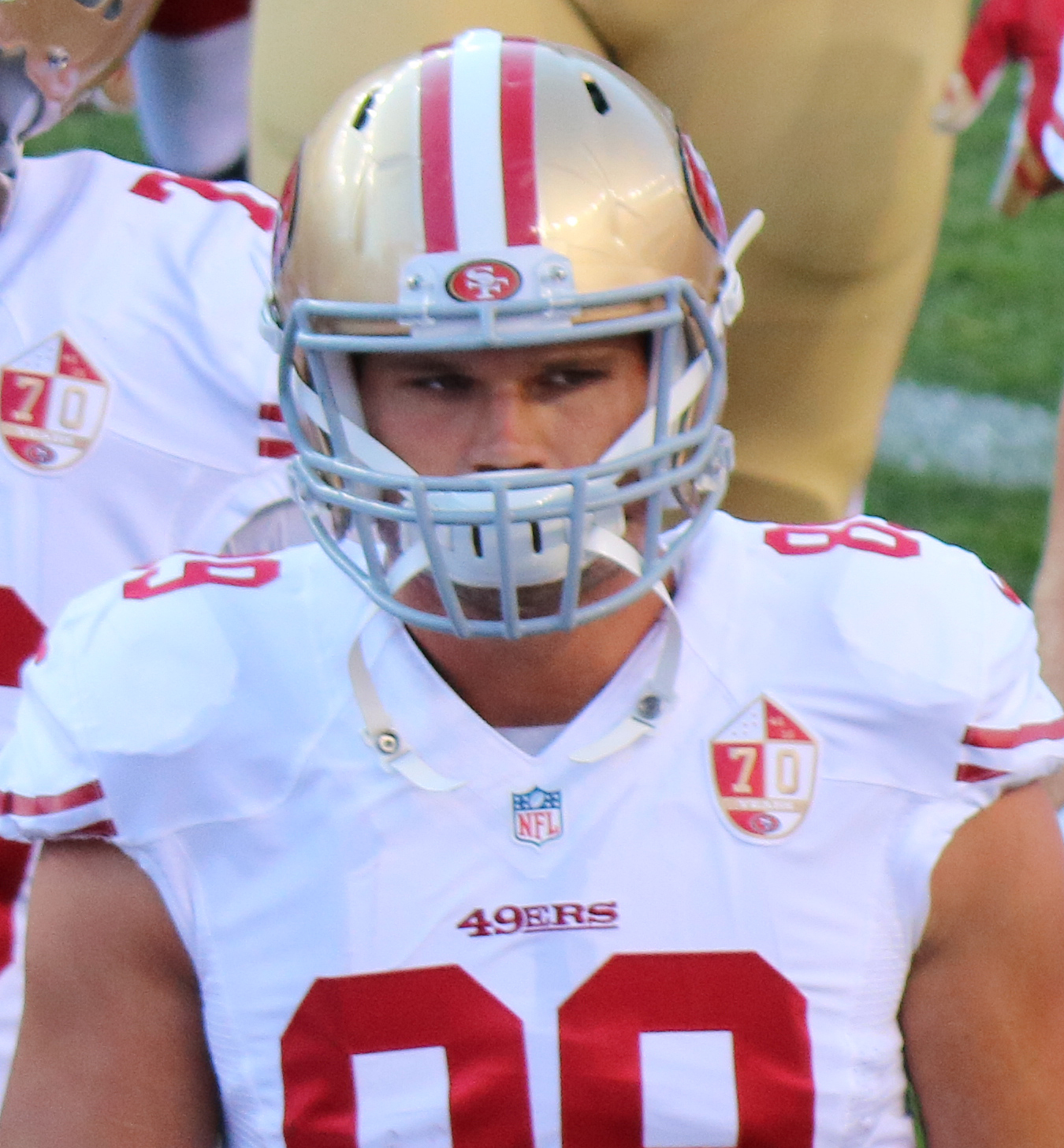
McDonald in 2016

McDonald started his first season under head coach Chip Kelly as the starting tight end for the first time in his career, as Vernon Davis was traded midway through the previous season.

During the 49ers' season-opening victory over the Los Angeles Rams, McDonald caught two passes, one for 14 yards and an eight-yard touchdown from Blaine Gabbert. In the next game, he caught a career-long 75-yard touchdown from Gabbert, during a 46–27 loss to the Carolina Panthers. On November 6, 2016, McDonald scored a 65-yard touchdown during a 41–23 loss to the New Orleans Saints.

On December 9, 2016, the 49ers signed McDonald to a five-year, $35 million extension that included $16 million guaranteed and a signing bonus of $7 million. He was placed on injured reserve three days later, after suffering a shoulder injury in Week 14 against the New York Jets. McDonald finished the 2016 season with 24 receptions for 391 yards and four touchdowns.

=== Pittsburgh Steelers ===
==== 2017 season ====
On August 29, 2017, the 49ers traded McDonald and their 2018 fifth-round pick to the Pittsburgh Steelers in exchange for the Steelers' 2018 fourth-round pick.

McDonald began the regular season as the backup tight end behind Jesse James. On September 10, McDonald made his Steelers debut in a 21–18 victory over the Cleveland Browns.

McDonald finished the 2017 season with 14 receptions for 188 yards and a touchdown in 10 games and seven starts. In the Divisional Round against the Jacksonville Jaguars, he had 10 receptions for 112 yards in the 45–42 loss.

==== 2018 season ====
During Monday Night Football against the Tampa Bay Buccaneers in Week 3, McDonald finished with four receptions for a career-high 112 yards and a 75-yard touchdown as the Steelers won 30–27. In Weeks 10 and 11, he recorded receiving touchdowns against the Carolina Panthers and Jacksonville Jaguars, respectively.

McDonald finished the 2018 season with 50 receptions for 610 yards and four touchdowns in 15 games and 14 starts.

==== 2019 season ====
During Week 2 against the Seattle Seahawks, McDonald caught seven passes for 38 yards and two touchdowns in the narrow 28–26 loss. McDonald finished the 2019 had 38 receptions for 273 yards and three touchdowns in 14 games and starts.

==== 2020 season ====
McDonald was placed on the reserve/COVID-19 list by the team on November 9, 2020, and was activated on November 24. He had 15 receptions for 99 yards in 14 games and 12 starts.

=== Retirement ===
On January 22, 2021, McDonald announced his retirement after eight seasons in the league.

== NFL career statistics ==
Legend
**Bold**	Career high

=== Regular season ===
Year	Team	Games		Receiving				
Year	Team	GP	GS	Rec	Yds	Avg	Lng	TD
2013	SF	**15**	4	8	119	14.9	25	0
2014	SF	8	4	2	30	15.0	21	0
2015	SF	14	11	30	326	10.9	36	3
2016	SF	11	11	24	391	**16.3**	**75T**	**4**
2017	PIT	10	7	14	188	13.4	28	1
2018	PIT	**15**	**14**	**50**	**610**	12.2	**75T**	**4**
2019	PIT	14	**14**	38	273	7.2	22	3
2020	PIT	14	12	15	99	6.6	15	0
Total		101	77	181	2,036	11.3	75	15

=== Postseason ===
Year	Team	Games		Receiving				
Year	Team	GP	GS	Rec	Yds	Avg	Lng	TD
2013	SF	**3**	**1**	1	13	13.0	13	0
2017	PIT	1	**1**	10	112	11.2	22	0
2020	PIT	1	**1**	0	0	0.0	0	0
Total		5	3	11	125	11.4	22	0

== Personal life ==
McDonald and his wife, Kendi, have three children. McDonald is a Christian and the pair are supporters of Convoy of Hope.
