= Operation Sea Breeze =

Operation Sea Breeze may refer to:

- Operation Sea Breeze (Sri Lanka) by the Sri Lankan Military in 1990
- 2010 Gaza flotilla raid by the Israeli Navy

== See also ==
- Sea Breeze (disambiguation)
