= Ocean Breeze =

Ocean Breeze may refer to:

== Places ==
- Ocean Breeze, Florida
- Ocean Breeze, neighborhood in South Beach, Staten Island, New York
  - Ocean Breeze Athletic Complex, an indoor track and field facility in Staten Island, New York
- Ocean Breeze Water Park, a water park in Virginia Beach, Virginia

== Ships ==
- SS Southern Cross (1955), an ocean liner built in 1955, formerly named OceanBreeze.
- Ocean Breeze (yacht), a luxury yacht formerly owned by Saddam Hussein

== See also ==
- Sea breeze
- Sea Breeze (disambiguation)
- Bay breeze (disambiguation)
- Ocean (disambiguation)
- Breeze (disambiguation)
