= 2025 Gulf Cup for Veteran Players =

كأس الخليج الأولى لقدامى اللاعبين

Tournament details
- Host country: Kuwait
- Dates: 22–26 February 2025
- Teams: 8 (from 1 confederation)
- Venue: 1 (in 1 host city)

Final positions
- Champions: Iraq (1st title)
- Runners-up: Oman

Tournament statistics
- Matches played: 15
- Goals scored: 11 (0.73 per match)
- Top scorer: Ismail Al-Ajmi (2 goals)
- Best player: Karrar Jassim
- Best goalkeeper: Noor Sabri

The 2025 Gulf Cup for Veteran Players was the first edition of the Gulf Cup for Veteran Players for the eight members of the Arab Gulf Cup Football Federation. The tournament was held in Kuwait from 22–26 February 2025 for retired players that have participated in previous Arabian Gulf Cup tournaments. The tournament was originally set to start on 20 February, but the start date was postponed by two days. Each match was 40 minutes in length.

The tournament was won by Iraq, who defeated Oman 4–3 on penalties in the final after a 0–0 draw. The success of the inaugural tournament led to calls to continue holding the competition alongside future Arabian Gulf Cups.

== Teams ==
Team	Appearance		
Team	Appearance	Qatar	1st
Iraq	1st		
Saudi Arabia	1st		
United Arab Emirates	1st		
Bahrain	1st		
Oman	1st		
Kuwait (hosts)	1st		
Yemen	1st		

=== Squads ===
Each team had to register a squad of 20 players, all of whom must be retired or over the age of 40, including three goalkeepers. All players must have taken part in at least one previous Arabian Gulf Cup tournament.

== Venues ==
Location of areas hosting the 1st Gulf Cup for Veteran Players
1 Sulaibikhat

(Kuwait)
Sulaibikhat Stadium
Capacity: 15,000
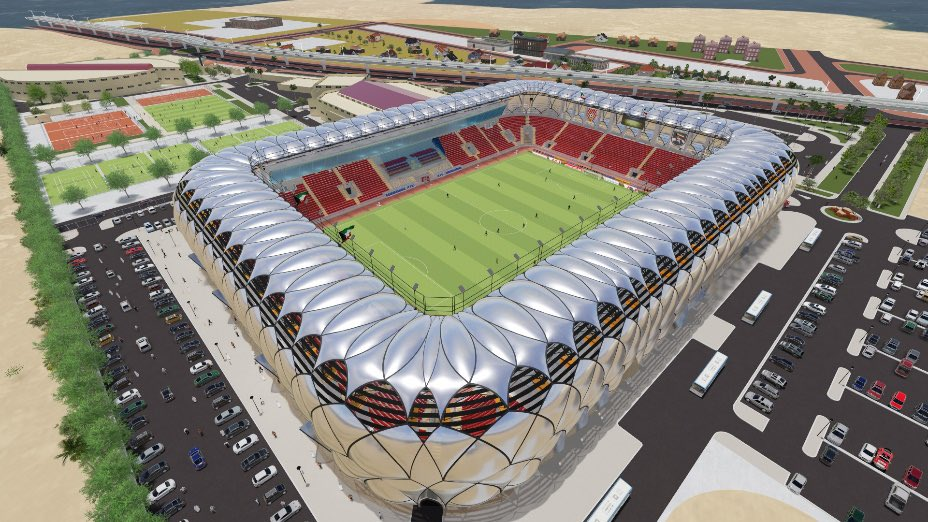

== Officials ==
Referees

All referees in charge of the tournament are retired referees who officiated at least one match in a previous Arabian Gulf Cup tournament.

- (Qatar) Saoud Ali Al Adba
- (Saudi Arabia) Nassir Rashid Hamdan
- (Kuwait) Ali Shaban
- (Yemen) Ahmed Qaid Saif Anaam
- (United Arab Emirates) Mohammed Amr
- (Iraq) Najim Aboud
- (Bahrain) Nawaf Shukralla
- (Oman) Mohammed Jumaa

== Group stage ==
Tiebreakers
Teams were ranked according to points (3 points for a win, 1 point for a draw, 0 points for a loss), and if tied on points, the following tiebreaking criteria were applied, in the order given, to determine the rankings:
1. Points in head-to-head matches among tied teams;
2. Goal difference in head-to-head matches among tied teams;
3. Goals scored in head-to-head matches among tied teams;
4. If more than two teams were tied, and after applying all head-to-head criteria above, a subset of teams were still tied, all head-to-head criteria above were reapplied exclusively to this subset of teams;
5. Goal difference in all group matches;
6. Goals scored in all group matches;
7. Disciplinary points (yellow card = 1 point, red card as a result of two yellow cards = 3 points, direct red card = 3 points, yellow card followed by direct red card = 4 points);
8. Drawing of lots.

Teams were divided into two groups according to the same draw as the 26th Arabian Gulf Cup. All times are local (UTC+03:00).

=== Group A ===
Pos	Team	Pld	W	D	L	GF	GA	GD	Pts	Qualification
1	Oman	3	1	2	0	2	1	+1	5	Knockout stage
2	Qatar	3	0	3	0	1	1	0	3	Knockout stage
3	Kuwait (H)	3	0	3	0	0	0	0	3	
4	United Arab Emirates	3	0	2	1	0	1	−1	2	

Source: AGCFF
Rules for classification: Group stage tiebreakers
(H) Hosts
22 February 2025
19:45

Qatar	0–0	United Arab Emirates
	Report

Sulaibikhat Stadium, Sulaibikhat
22 February 2025
21:15

Kuwait	0–0	Oman
	Report

Sulaibikhat Stadium, Sulaibikhat

23 February 2025
16:45

Oman	1–1	Qatar
Al-Ajmi 9'	Report	Jassem 5' (pen.)

Sulaibikhat Stadium, Sulaibikhat
23 February 2025
19:45

Kuwait	0–0	United Arab Emirates
	Report

Sulaibikhat Stadium, Sulaibikhat

24 February 2025
18:15

United Arab Emirates	0–1	Oman
	Report	Al-Ajmi 19'

Sulaibikhat Stadium, Sulaibikhat
24 February 2025
21:15

Kuwait	0–0	Qatar
	Report

Sulaibikhat Stadium, Sulaibikhat

=== Group B ===
Pos	Team	Pld	W	D	L	GF	GA	GD	Pts	Qualification
1	Iraq	3	2	1	0	2	0	+2	7	Knockout stage
2	Bahrain	3	1	2	0	1	0	+1	5	Knockout stage
3	Saudi Arabia	3	1	1	1	1	1	0	4	
4	Yemen	3	0	0	3	0	3	−3	0	

Source: AGCFF
Rules for classification: Group stage tiebreakers
22 February 2025
16:45

Iraq	1–0	Yemen
Jassim 3'	Report

Sulaibikhat Stadium, Sulaibikhat
22 February 2025
18:15

Saudi Arabia	0–0	Bahrain
	Report

Sulaibikhat Stadium, Sulaibikhat

23 February 2025
18:15

Yemen	0–1	Saudi Arabia
	Report	Al-Shamrani 14'

Sulaibikhat Stadium, Sulaibikhat
23 February 2025
21:15

Iraq	0–0	Bahrain
	Report

Sulaibikhat Stadium, Sulaibikhat

24 February 2025
16:45

Bahrain	1–0	Yemen
Yousef 28' (pen.)	Report

Sulaibikhat Stadium, Sulaibikhat
24 February 2025
19:45

Iraq	1–0	Saudi Arabia
Karim 33' (pen.)	Report

Sulaibikhat Stadium, Sulaibikhat

== Knockout stage ==
In the knockout stage, a penalty shoot-out is used to decide the winner if necessary.

=== Bracket ===
Semi-finals
25 February – Sulaibikhat
Oman	2
Bahrain	1
25 February – Sulaibikhat
Iraq	1
Qatar	0

Final
26 February – Sulaibikhat
Oman	0 (3)
Iraq (p)	0 (4)

=== Semi-finals ===
25 February 2025
16:45

Oman	2–1	Bahrain
Saleh 31'; Rabia 38'	Report	Taleb 4'

Sulaibikhat Stadium, Sulaibikhat
25 February 2025
18:30

Iraq	1–0	Qatar
Ahmed 20'	Report

Sulaibikhat Stadium, Sulaibikhat

=== Final ===
26 February 2025
19:00

Iraq	0–0	Oman
	Report
Penalties
Mnajed (penalty missed); Karim (penalty scored); Jassim (penalty scored); Abdul-Amir (penalty missed); Saeed (penalty scored); Mushir (penalty scored)	4–3	(penalty missed) Al-Gheilani; (penalty scored) Al-Ajmi; (penalty missed) Al-Maimani; (penalty scored) Mubarak; (penalty scored) Bashir; (penalty missed) Saleh

Sulaibikhat Stadium, Sulaibikhat

== Winner ==
1st Gulf Cup for Veteran Players Winner
(Iraq)
Iraq
First title

== Goalscorers ==
There were 11 goals scored in 15 matches, for an average of 0.733 goals per match.

2 goals

- (Oman) Ismail Al-Ajmi

1 goal

- (Bahrain) Ahmed Hassan Taleb
- (Bahrain) Talal Yousef
- (Iraq) Hammadi Ahmed
- (Iraq) Karrar Jassim
- (Iraq) Mustafa Karim
- (Oman) Hassan Rabia
- (Oman) Hashim Saleh
- (Qatar) Waleed Jassem
- (Saudi Arabia) Nasser Al-Shamrani

== Prize money and awards ==
=== Prize money ===
Team

Position	Amount (USD)
Champions	200,000
Runner-up	150,000
Total	350,000

Individual

Position	Amount (QAR)
Top Scorer	50,000
Best Goalkeeper	50,000
Most Valuable Player	50,000
Total	150,000

=== Player awards ===
The following awards were given:

Award	Player
Top Scorer	Ismail Al-Ajmi
Most Valuable Player	Karrar Jassim
Best Goalkeeper	Noor Sabri
