= 2019 Pittsburgh Steelers season =

87th season in franchise history

- Owner: The Rooney Family
- General manager: Kevin Colbert
- Head coach: Mike Tomlin
- Offensive coordinator: Randy Fichtner
- Defensive coordinator: Keith Butler
- Home stadium: Heinz Field

Results
- Record: 8–8
- Division place: 2nd AFC North
- Playoffs: Did not qualify
- All-Pros: 5: FS Minkah Fitzpatrick (1st team); DT Cameron Heyward (1st team); PR Diontae Johnson (2nd team); EDGE T. J. Watt (1st team); LB T. J. Watt (2nd team)
- Pro Bowlers: 6: OG David DeCastro; FS Minkah Fitzpatrick; CB Joe Haden; DT Cameron Heyward; C Maurkice Pouncey; OLB T. J. Watt
- Team MVP: T. J. Watt
- Team ROY: Devin Bush Jr.

Uniform
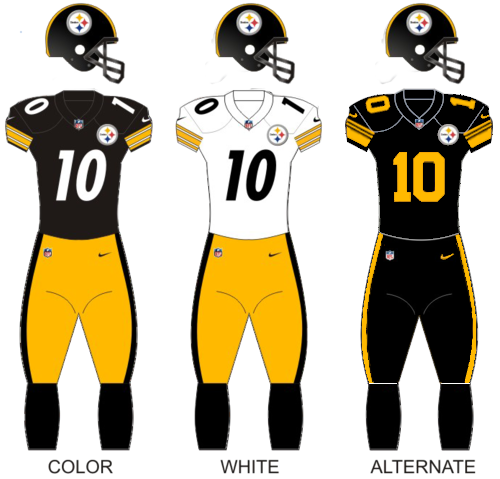

The 2019 season was the Pittsburgh Steelers' 87th season as a professional sports franchise and as a member of the National Football League (NFL). It marked the 20th season under leadership of general manager Kevin Colbert and the 13th under head coach Mike Tomlin. The team failed to improve upon its 9–6–1 record from 2018 following a Week 16 loss to the New York Jets.

For the first time since 2013, they started the season with a 1–4 record through Week 5, which included a 33–3 opening loss to the defending Super Bowl champion New England Patriots, and an injury to Ben Roethlisberger the very next game. However, they went on to win seven out of their next eight games to reach Week 14 of the season with an 8–5 record before losing three consecutive games to end the 2019 season with an 8–8 record and missed the playoffs for the second straight season. They also tied for their worst record (2006, 2012, 2013) since the 2003 season.

For the first time since 2009, wide receiver Antonio Brown was not on the roster, as he was traded to the Oakland Raiders on March 9, 2019.

== Transactions ==
The Steelers were involved in the following transactions during the 2019 season:

=== Trades ===
Player	Acquired from	Traded to	Date	Trade terms
OT Marcus Gilbert		Arizona Cardinals	March 13	2019 6th round pick (207th)
WR Antonio Brown		Oakland Raiders	March 13	2019 3rd round pick (66th); 2019 5th round pick (141st)
OT Jerald Hawkins		Tampa Bay Buccaneers	August 31	2021 7th round pick to Tampa Bay; 2021 6th round pick to Pittsburgh
QB Joshua Dobbs		Jacksonville Jaguars	September 9	2020 5th round pick
FS Minkah Fitzpatrick	Miami Dolphins		September 17	2020 1st round pick 2020 4th round pick 2021 6th round pick to Miami; 2020 4th round pick 2021 7th round pick to Pittsburgh
TE Nick Vannett	Seattle Seahawks		September 25	2020 5th round pick

=== Free agent signings ===
Player	Acquired from	Lost to	Date	Contract terms
RB Le'Veon Bell		New York Jets	March 13	4 years / $52.5 million
TE Jesse James		Detroit Lions	March 14	4 years / $22.6 million
LB L. J. Fort		Philadelphia Eagles	March 14	3 years / $5.5 million
CB Steven Nelson	Kansas City Chiefs		March 14	3 years / $25.5 million
WR Donte Moncrief	Jacksonville Jaguars		March 14	2 years / $9 million
LB Mark Barron	Los Angeles Rams		March 19	2 years / $12 million

=== Cuts ===
Position	Player	Date
SS	Morgan Burnett	April 1
ILB	Jon Bostic	April 27
OLB	Keion Adams	May 13
G	R. J. Prince	May 13
RB	Ralph Webb	August 19
CB	Herb Waters	August 27
OLB	Tegray Scales	August 31
TE	Kevin Rader	August 31
WR	Johnny Holton	August 31
NT	Winston Craig	August 31
FS	Marcus Allen	August 31
DE	Conor Sheehy	August 31
WR	Trey Griffey	August 31
CB	Brian Allen	August 31
NT	Casey Sayles	August 31
CB	Trevon Mathis	August 31
C	J. C. Hassenauer	August 31
OLB	Jayrone Elliott	August 31
FS	Marcelis Branch	August 31
C	Patrick Morris	August 31
OLB	Christian Kuntz	August 31
ILB	Robert Spillane	August 31
WR	Eli Rogers	August 31
RB	Trey Edmunds	August 31
NT	Henry Mondeaux	August 31
WR	Tevin Jones	August 31
RB	Malik Williams	August 31
WR	Brandon Reilly	August 31
DE	Greg Gilmore	August 31
OLB	Tuzar Skipper	September 7

== Roster moves ==
Several players who played significant roles in the Steelers' recent success did not return for 2019. Among the departed were:

- Offensive tackle Marcus Gilbert, traded to the Arizona Cardinals on March 8, 2019 for the Cardinals compensatory 6th round pick, used on Ulysees Gilbert III.
- Wide receiver Antonio Brown, traded to the Oakland Raiders on March 9, 2019 for the Raiders 3rd and 5th round picks in the 2019 NFL draft, used to select Diontae Johnson and Zach Gentry, respectively.
- Running back Le'Veon Bell, who signed with the New York Jets on March 13, 2019.
- Tight end Jesse James, who signed with the Detroit Lions on March 14, 2019.

Several of these moves were made in the name of eliminating "distractions", namely from Brown and Bell. Brown had several clashes with the coaching staff, sports media and teammates (most notably Ben Roethlisberger and JuJu Smith-Schuster) and was subsequently benched in the Steelers season finale against the Cincinnati Bengals, which led to Brown demanding a trade. Bell had been tagged with the franchise tag the previous two seasons and sat out the 2018 season; the Steelers opted not to tag him for a third time due to salary cap constraints as well as the emergence of fan favorite James Conner and Bell subsequently signed with the Jets for less than what the Steelers had offered him. Gilbert was injured for much of 2018 and was made expendable due to the emergence of Matt Feiler in his spot. James, initially groomed to be the heir replacement to Heath Miller, ultimately remained a backup after the Steelers traded for Vance McDonald.

In addition to the players traded away and cut, Ryan Shazier remained out due to his 2017 spinal injury against the Bengals. After struggling to fill his role during the 2018 campaign, the Steelers addressed his long-term absence by going to the other side of the Michigan–Ohio State football rivalry by trading up in the 2019 draft to draft Michigan linebacker Devin Bush Jr. Shazier was subsequently placed on the reserve/PUP list for the 2019 season.

=== Draft ===
2019 Pittsburgh Steelers Draft
Round	Selection	Player	Position	College	Notes
1	10	Devin Bush	ILB	Michigan	from Denver
3	66	Diontae Johnson	WR	Toledo	from Oakland
3	83	Justin Layne	CB	Michigan State	
4	122	Benny Snell	RB	Kentucky	
5	141	Zach Gentry	TE	Michigan	from Oakland
6	175	Sutton Smith	OLB	Northern Illinois	from Oakland
6	192	Isaiah Buggs	DE	Alabama	
6	207	Ulysees Gilbert III	ILB	Akron	from Arizona
7	219	Derwin Gray	OT	Maryland	from Tampa Bay

Notes

- Pittsburgh traded their 2019 fifth-round selection to Oakland in exchange for wide receiver Ryan Switzer and Oakland's sixth-round selection.
- Pittsburgh traded their 2019 seventh-round selection and wide receiver Sammie Coates to Cleveland in exchange for Cleveland's 2018 sixth-round selection that originally belonged to Pittsburgh.
- Pittsburgh traded their 2018 sixth-round selection to Tampa Bay in exchange for their 2019 seventh-round selection and free safety J. J. Wilcox.
- Pittsburgh traded right tackle Marcus Gilbert to Arizona in exchange for a 2019 sixth-round compensatory selection.
- Pittsburgh traded wide receiver Antonio Brown to Oakland in exchange for Oakland's third round selection and their fifth-round selection.

=== Undrafted free agents ===
All undrafted free agents were signed after the 2019 NFL draft concluded on April 26 unless otherwise noted.

= Made Week 1 roster

Position	Player	College	Notes
S	Dravon Askew-Henry	West Virginia	
P	Ian Berryman	Western Carolina	
G	Garrett Brumfield	LSU	
DE	Greg Gilmore	LSU	Signed May 13
DE	Jay Hayes	Georgia	
QB	Devlin Hodges	Samford	Signed May 13
G	Fred Johnson	Florida	
RB	Travon McMillan	Colorado	
CB	Alexander Myres	Houston	
NT	Chris Nelson	Texas	
T	Damian Prince	Maryland	Signed May 13
LB	Tuzar Skipper	Toledo	Signed May 13
TE/LS	Trevor Wood	Texas A&M	
K	Matthew Wright	UCF	

== Staff ==
2019 Pittsburgh Steelers staff
Front office: President – Art Rooney II; Vice president – Art Rooney Jr.; Vice president & general manager – Kevin Colbert; Vice president of football and business administration – Omar Khan; Football administration coordinator – Samir Suleiman; Player personnel coordinator – Dan Rooney Jr.; College scouting coordinator – Phil Kreidler; Pro scouting coordinator – Brandon Hunt; Analytics and football research coordinator – Karim Kassam; Head coaches: Head coach – Mike Tomlin; Assistant head coach – John Mitchell; Offensive coaches: Offensive coordinator/quarterbacks – Randy Fichtner; Running backs – Eddie Faulkner; Interim wide receivers – Ray Sherman; Tight ends – James Daniel; Offensive line – Shaun Sarrett; Assistant offensive line – Adrian Klemm	Defensive coaches: Defensive coordinator/Outside linebackers – Keith Butler; Defensive line – Karl Dunbar; Inside linebackers – Jerry Olsavsky; Defensive backs – Tom Bradley; Senior defensive assistant/secondary – Teryl Austin; Special teams coaches: Special teams coordinator – Danny Smith; Strength and conditioning: Conditioning coordinator – Garrett Giemont; Conditioning assistant – Marcel Pastoor

== Final roster ==
2019 Pittsburgh Steelers roster
Quarterbacks (QB): 6 Devlin Hodges; 5 Paxton Lynch; Running backs (RB): 30 James Conner; 33 Trey Edmunds; 38 Jaylen Samuels; 24 Benny Snell; 40 Kerrith Whyte; Wide receivers (WR): 17 Deon Cain; 82 Amara Darboh; 80 Johnny Holton; 18 Diontae Johnson; 19 JuJu Smith-Schuster; 13 James Washington; Tight ends (TE): 81 Zach Gentry; 89 Vance McDonald; 88 Nick Vannett	Offensive linemen (OL): 72 Zach Banner T; 66 David DeCastro G; 71 Matt Feiler T; 67 B. J. Finney C/G; 73 Ramon Foster G; 60 J. C. Hassenauer C; 76 Chukwuma Okorafor T; 53 Maurkice Pouncey C; 78 Alejandro Villanueva T; Defensive linemen (DL): 94 Tyson Alualu DE; 96 Isaiah Buggs DE; 79 Javon Hargrave NT; 97 Cameron Heyward DE; 93 Daniel McCullers NT	Linebackers (LB): 92 Ola Adeniyi OLB; 26 Mark Barron ILB; 55 Devin Bush Jr. ILB; 56 Anthony Chickillo OLB; 48 Bud Dupree OLB; 44 Tyler Matakevich ILB; 51 Tuzar Skipper OLB; 41 Robert Spillane ILB; 90 T. J. Watt OLB; 98 Vince Williams ILB; Defensive backs (DB): 27 Marcus Allen SS; 25 Artie Burns CB; 37 Jordan Dangerfield FS; 34 Terrell Edmunds SS; 39 Minkah Fitzpatrick FS; 23 Joe Haden CB; 28 Mike Hilton CB; 31 Justin Layne CB; 22 Steven Nelson CB; 20 Cameron Sutton CB; Special teams (ST): 4 Jordan Berry P; 9 Chris Boswell K; 57 Kameron Canaday LS	Practice squad: 16 J. T. Barrett QB; 14 Jamal Custis WR; 74 Christian DiLauro T; 77 Derwin Gray T; 15 Quadree Henderson WR; 46 Tray Matthews SS; 99 Henry Mondeaux DE; 35 Alexander Myres CB; 87 Kevin Rader TE; 49 Christian Scotland-Williamson TE (Int.); 29 Ralph Webb RB; Reserve: 21 Sean Davis FS (IR); 54 Ulysees Gilbert ILB (IR); 95 Lavon Hooks DE (IR); 45 Roosevelt Nix FB (IR/DFR); 7 Ben Roethlisberger QB (IR); 50 Ryan Shazier ILB (PUP); 10 Ryan Switzer WR (IR/DFR); 91 Stephon Tuitt DE (IR); 2 Mason Rudolph QB (IR); 95 L. T. Walton DE (IR); Rookies in italics 53 active, 10 reserve, 11 practice squad

== Preseason ==
Week	Date	Opponent	Result	Record	Venue	Recap
1	August 9	Tampa Bay Buccaneers	W 30–28	1–0	Heinz Field	Recap
2	August 17	Kansas City Chiefs	W 17–7	2–0	Heinz Field	Recap
3	August 25	at Tennessee Titans	W 18–6	3–0	Nissan Stadium	Recap
4	August 29	at Carolina Panthers	L 19–25	3–1	Bank of America Stadium	Recap

== Regular season ==
=== Schedule ===
The Steelers, along with the rest of the NFL, unveiled their schedule on April 17. The team released a video on social media unveiling their schedule by using the Neighborhood of Make-Believe from Mister Rogers' Neighborhood in honor of Pittsburgh native Fred Rogers. Longtime radio play-by-play announcer Bill Hillgrove did the voiceover, referring to the Steelers division rivals as their "neighbors", their Thursday night game as "speedy delivery" (in honor of Mr. McFeely), their three West Coast games as "traveling to a far-away land", and the series' closing theme to reference the team's bye week. The Steelers received critical acclaim by both USA Today and the Pittsburgh Tribune-Review for honoring Rogers.

Week	Date	Opponent	Result	Record	Venue	Recap
1	September 8	at New England Patriots	**L** 3–33	0–1	Gillette Stadium	Recap
2	September 15	Seattle Seahawks	**L** 26–28	0–2	Heinz Field	Recap
3	September 22	at San Francisco 49ers	**L** 20–24	0–3	Levi's Stadium	Recap
4	September 30	**Cincinnati Bengals**	**W** 27–3	1–3	Heinz Field	Recap
5	October 6	**Baltimore Ravens**	**L** 23–26 (OT)	1–4	Heinz Field	Recap
6	October 13	at Los Angeles Chargers	**W** 24–17	2–4	Dignity Health Sports Park	Recap
7	Bye					
8	October 28	Miami Dolphins	**W** 27–14	3–4	Heinz Field	Recap
9	November 3	Indianapolis Colts	**W** 26–24	4–4	Heinz Field	Recap
10	November 10	Los Angeles Rams	**W** 17–12	5–4	Heinz Field	Recap
11	November 14	at **Cleveland Browns**	**L** 7–21	5–5	FirstEnergy Stadium	Recap
12	November 24	at **Cincinnati Bengals**	**W** 16–10	6–5	Paul Brown Stadium	Recap
13	December 1	**Cleveland Browns**	**W** 20–13	7–5	Heinz Field	Recap
14	December 8	at Arizona Cardinals	**W** 23–17	8–5	State Farm Stadium	Recap
15	December 15	Buffalo Bills	**L** 10–17	8–6	Heinz Field	Recap
16	December 22	at New York Jets	**L** 10–16	8–7	MetLife Stadium	Recap
17	December 29	at **Baltimore Ravens**	**L** 10–28	8–8	M&T Bank Stadium	Recap

Note: Divisional opponents are in bold text.

=== Game summaries ===
==== Week 1: at New England Patriots ====
Week One: Pittsburgh Steelers at New England Patriots – Game summary

Quarter	1	2	3	4	Total
Steelers	0	0	3	0	**3**
**Patriots**	7	13	10	3	**33**

at Gillette Stadium, Foxborough, Massachusetts

- Date: September 8
- Game time: 8:20 p.m. EDT
- Game weather: Partly cloudy and mild, 66 °F (19 °C)
- Game attendance: 65,878
- Referee: Clete Blakeman
- TV announcers (NBC): Al Michaels, Cris Collinsworth, Michele Tafoya and Terry McAulay
- Recap, Game Book

Game information

**First quarter**

- NE – Josh Gordon 20-yard pass from Tom Brady (Stephen Gostkowski kick), 4:46. Patriots 7–0. **Drive: 7 plays, 82 yards, 3:08.**

**Second quarter**

- NE – Stephen Gostkowski 25-yard field goal, 11:52. Patriots 10–0. **Drive: 12 plays, 55 yards, 5:24.**
- NE – Phillip Dorsett 25-yard pass from Tom Brady (Stephen Gostkowski kick), 3:49. Patriots 17–0. **Drive: 6 plays, 80 yards, 3:09.**
- NE – Stephen Gostkowski 41-yard field goal, 0:17. Patriots 20–0. **Drive: 8 plays, 30 yards, 1:40.**

**Third quarter**

- PIT – Chris Boswell 19-yard field goal, 10:17. Patriots 20–3. **Drive: 11 plays, 74 yards, 4:43.**
- NE – Phillip Dorsett 58-yard pass from Tom Brady (Stephen Gostkowski kick), 8:05. Patriots 27–3. **Drive: 4 plays, 75 yards, 2:12.**
- NE – Stephen Gostkowski 35-yard field goal, 0:13. Patriots 30–3. **Drive: 9 plays, 73 yards, 5:07.**

**Fourth quarter**

- NE – Stephen Gostkowski 39-yard field goal, 6:38. Patriots 33–3. **Drive: 13 plays, 34 yards, 5:48.**

**Top passers**

- PIT – Ben Roethlisberger – 27/47, 276 yards, INT
- NE – Tom Brady – 24/36, 341 yards, 3 TD

**Top rushers**

- PIT – James Conner – 10 rushes, 21 yards
- NE – Rex Burkhead – 8 rushes, 44 yards

**Top receivers**

- PIT – JuJu Smith-Schuster – 6 receptions, 78 yards
- NE – Phillip Dorsett – 4 receptions, 95 yards, 2 TD

The Steelers started their season on the road against the Patriots. The Patriots scored first, 10 minutes into the opening quarter, when Tom Brady found Josh Gordon on a 20-yard touchdown pass to make it 7–0 for the only score of the period. They made it 10–0 in the second quarter when Stephen Gostkowski kicked a 25-yard field goal. This was followed up by Brady connecting with Philip Dorsett on a 25-yard touchdown pass to make it 17–0, before Gostkowski kicked a 41-yard field goal to make it 20–0 at halftime. In the third quarter, the Steelers managed to get on the board when Chris Boswell kicked a 19-yard field goal to make it 20–3. However, Brady and Dorsett connected again on a 58-yard touchdown pass to make it 27–3. This was followed up by Gostkowski kicking a 35-yard field goal to put the Pats up 30–3. In the fourth quarter, the Pats scored the only three points with Gostkowski's fourth field goal of the game to make the eventual final score 33–3.

With the loss, the Steelers started 0–1.

==== Week 2: vs. Seattle Seahawks ====
Week Two: Seattle Seahawks at Pittsburgh Steelers – Game summary

Quarter	1	2	3	4	Total
**Seahawks**	0	7	14	7	**28**
Steelers	0	10	3	13	**26**

at Heinz Field, Pittsburgh, Pennsylvania

- Date: September 15
- Game time: 1:00 p.m. EDT
- Game weather: Sunny, 81 °F (27 °C)
- Game attendance: 65,063
- Referee: Carl Cheffers
- TV announcers (Fox): Kenny Albert, Ronde Barber and Lindsay Czarniak
- Recap, Game Book

Game information

**First quarter**

- No scoring plays.

**Second quarter**

- PIT – James Conner 1-yard run (Chris Boswell kick), 14:44. Steelers 7–0. **Drive: 3 plays, 22 yards, 0:27.**
- SEA – Will Dissly 14-yard pass from Russell Wilson (Jason Myers kick), 8:40. Tied 7–7. **Drive: 12 plays, 75 yards, 6:04.**
- PIT – Chris Boswell 41-yard field goal, 2:28. Steelers 10–7. **Drive: 7 plays, 49 yards, 3:26.**

**Third quarter**

- SEA – Will Dissly 12-yard pass from Russell Wilson (Jason Myers kick), 9:49. Seahawks 14–10. **Drive: 6 plays, 40 yards, 2:46.**
- PIT – Chris Boswell 33-yard field goal, 6:21. Seahawks 14–13. **Drive: 7 plays, 60 yards, 3:28.**
- SEA – Rashaad Penny 37-yard run (Jason Myers kick), 2:56. Seahawks 21–13. **Drive: 7 plays, 75 yards, 3:25.**

**Fourth quarter**

- PIT – Vance McDonald 8-yard pass from Mason Rudolph (pass failed), 11:16. Seahawks 21–19. **Drive: 12 plays, 75 yards, 6:40.**
- SEA – DK Metcalf 28-yard pass from Russell Wilson (Jason Myers kick), 7:15. Seahawks 28–19. **Drive: 6 plays, 75 yards, 4:01.**
- PIT – Vance McDonald 3-yard pass from Mason Rudolph (Chris Boswell kick), 5:34. Seahawks 28–26. **Drive: 1 play, 3 yards, 0:03.**

**Top passers**

- SEA – Russell Wilson – 29/35, 300 yards, 3 TD
- PIT – Mason Rudolph – 12/19, 112 yards, 2 TD, INT

**Top rushers**

- SEA – Rashaad Penny – 10 rushes, 62 yards, TD
- PIT – James Conner – 11 rushes, 33 yards, TD

**Top receivers**

- SEA – Tyler Lockett – 10 receptions, 79 yards
- PIT – JuJu Smith-Schuster – 5 receptions, 84 yards

The Steelers opened their season at home against the Seahawks. After a scoreless first quarter, the Steelers scored first in the second when James Conner ran for a 1-yard touchdown to make it 7–0. The Seahawks tied it up when QB Russell Wilson found Will Dissly on a 14-yard pass to make it 7–7. Though, the Steelers would retake the lead at halftime when Chris Boswell kicked a 41-yard field goal to make it 10–7. Wilson and Dissley connected again in the third quarter on a 12-yard pass to make it 14–10, though the Steelers later came within a point after Boswell kicked a 33-yard field goal to make it 14–13. The Seahawks pulled away when Rashaad Penny ran for a 37-yard touchdown to make it 21–13. In the fourth quarter, the Steelers came within 2 when backup QB Mason Rudolph found TE Vance McDonald on an 8-yard pass (with a failed two-point conversion) to make it 21–19. The Seahawks responded as Wilson found DK Metcalf on a 28-yard pass to make it 28–19. The Steelers scored the final points of the game with Rudolph again connecting with McDonald from three yards out to make the final score 28–26.

With the loss, the Steelers fell to 0–2, their first such start since 2013. Longtime franchise QB Ben Roethlisberger was also ruled out for the season after suffering a non-contact elbow injury during the game.

==== Week 3: at San Francisco 49ers ====
Week Three: Pittsburgh Steelers at San Francisco 49ers – Game summary

Quarter	1	2	3	4	Total
Steelers	6	0	7	7	**20**
**49ers**	0	3	14	7	**24**

at Levi's Stadium, Santa Clara, California

- Date: September 22
- Game time: 4:25 pm. EDT/1:25 p.m. PDT
- Game weather: Partly cloudy, 79 °F (26 °C)
- Game attendance: 69,439
- Referee: Scott Novak
- TV announcers (CBS): Greg Gumbel, Trent Green and Melanie Collins
- Recap, Game Book

Game information

**First quarter**

- PIT – Chris Boswell 46-yard field goal, 11:47. Steelers 3–0. **Drive: 4 plays, 5 yards, 2:00.**
- PIT – Chris Boswell 26-yard field goal, 2:04. Steelers 6–0. **Drive: 6 plays, 16 yards, 2:40.**

**Second quarter**

- SF – Robbie Gould 24-yard field goal, 6:45. Steelers 6–3. **Drive: 9 plays, 43 yards, 3:52.**

**Third quarter**

- SF – Jeff Wilson 1-yard run (Robbie Gould kick), 9:17. 49ers 10–6. **Drive: 8 plays, 38 yards, 4:02.**
- PIT – JuJu Smith-Schuster 76-yard pass from Mason Rudolph (Chris Boswell kick), 5:42. Steelers 13–10. **Drive: 3 plays, 82 yards, 1:31.**
- SF – Jeff Wilson 4-yard run (Robbie Gould kick), 0:56. 49ers 17–13. **Drive: 10 plays, 75 yards, 4:46.**

**Fourth quarter**

- PIT – Diontae Johnson 39-yard pass from Mason Rudolph (Chris Boswell kick), 10:22. Steelers 20–17. **Drive: 2 plays, 81 yards, 0:56.**
- SF – Dante Pettis 5-yard pass from Jimmy Garoppolo (Robbie Gould kick), 1:15. 49ers 24–20. **Drive: 7 plays, 24 yards, 4:14.**

**Top passers**

- PIT – Mason Rudolph – 14/27, 174 yards, 2 TD, INT
- SF – Jimmy Garoppolo – 23/32, 277 yards, TD, 2 INT

**Top rushers**

- PIT – James Conner – 13 rushes, 43 yards
- SF – Raheem Mostert – 12 rushes, 79 yards

**Top receivers**

- PIT – JuJu Smith-Schuster – 3 receptions, 81 yards, TD
- SF – George Kittle – 6 receptions, 57 yards

After a tough loss at home, the Steelers headed back on the road for a game against the 49ers. In the first quarter, it was all Steelers when Chris Boswell kicked two field goals from 46 and 26 yards out to make it 6–0. The Niners got on the board when Robbie Gould kicked a 24-yard field goal in the second to make it 6–3 at halftime. In the third quarter, the Niners took the lead when Jeff Wilson ran for a 1-yard touchdown to make it 10–6, though the Steelers retook the lead when Mason Rudolph found JuJu Smith-Schuster on a 79-yard pass to make it 13–10. The Niners retook the lead later on in the quarter when Wilson ran for a 4-yard touchdown to make it 17–13. In the fourth quarter, Rudolph found Diontae Johnson on a 39-yard pass to retake the lead 20–17. Though, the Niners ended up winning the game when Jimmy Garoppolo found Dante Pettis on a 5-yard pass for a final score of 24–20.

With the loss, the Steelers fell to 0–3 for the first time since 2013.

==== Week 4: vs. Cincinnati Bengals ====
Week Four: Cincinnati Bengals at Pittsburgh Steelers – Game summary

Quarter	1	2	3	4	Total
Bengals	3	0	0	0	**3**
**Steelers**	0	10	14	3	**27**

at Heinz Field, Pittsburgh, Pennsylvania

- Date: September 30
- Game time: 8:15 pm. EDT
- Game weather: Clear, 76 °F (24 °C)
- Game attendance: 57,959
- Referee: Bill Vinovich
- TV announcers (ESPN): Joe Tessitore, Booger McFarland, Lisa Salters and John Parry
- Recap, Game Book

Game information

**First quarter**

- CIN – Randy Bullock 28-yard field goal, 8:22. Bengals 3–0. **Drive: 4 plays, 5 yards, 0:54.**

**Second quarter**

- PIT – James Conner 21-yard pass from Mason Rudolph (Chris Boswell kick), 10:32. Steelers 7–3. **Drive: 5 plays, 46 yards, 2:40.**
- PIT – Chris Boswell 29-yard field goal, 0:58. Steelers 10–3. **Drive: 11 plays, 60 yards, 4:51.**

**Third quarter**

- PIT – Jaylen Samuels 2-yard run (Chris Boswell kick), 10:36. Steelers 17–3. **Drive: 8 plays, 75 yards, 4:24.**
- PIT – Diontae Johnson 43-yard pass from Mason Rudolph (Chris Boswell kick), 9:24. Steelers 24–3. **Drive: 2 plays, 43 yards, 0:11.**

**Fourth quarter**

- PIT – Chris Boswell 49-yard field goal, 5:51. Steelers 27–3. **Drive: 9 plays, 49 yards, 5:11.**

**Top passers**

- CIN – Andy Dalton – 21/37, 171 yards, INT
- PIT – Mason Rudolph – 24/28, 229 yards, 2 TD

**Top rushers**

- CIN – Joe Mixon – 15 rushes, 62 yards
- PIT – James Conner – 10 rushes, 42 yards

**Top receivers**

- CIN – Auden Tate – 4 receptions, 50 yards
- PIT – James Conner – 8 receptions, 83 yards, TD

After another tough loss, the Steelers returned home for a Monday Night Football duel against the Bengals. In the first quarter, the Bengals scored first, when Randy Bullock kicked a 28-yard field goal to make it 3–0 for the quarter's only score. However, it would be all Steelers from the second quarter onwards when they scored 27 consecutive points to seal the game and get their first win.

With the win—their ninth straight over the Bengals—the Steelers improved to 1–3.

==== Week 5: vs. Baltimore Ravens ====
Week Five: Baltimore Ravens at Pittsburgh Steelers – Game summary

Quarter	1	2	3	4	OT	Total
**Ravens**	10	7	0	6	3	**26**
Steelers	7	6	7	3	0	**23**

at Heinz Field, Pittsburgh, Pennsylvania

- Date: October 6
- Game time: 1:00 pm. EDT
- Game weather: Rain, 70 °F (21 °C)
- Game attendance: 64,037
- Referee: Walt Anderson
- TV announcers (CBS): Ian Eagle, Dan Fouts and Evan Washburn
- Recap, Game Book

Game information

**First quarter**

- BAL – Justin Tucker 27-yard field goal, 7:21. Ravens 3–0. **Drive: 10 plays, 50 yards, 5:16.**
- BAL – Mark Ingram II 4-yard run (Justin Tucker kick), 4:48. Ravens 10–0. **Drive: 4 plays, 15 yards, 2:21.**
- PIT – JuJu Smith-Schuster 35-yard pass from Mason Rudolph (Chris Boswell kick), 2:41. Ravens 10–7. **Drive: 5 plays, 75 yards, 2:07.**

**Second quarter**

- BAL – Marquise Brown 11-yard pass from Lamar Jackson (Justin Tucker kick), 11:21. Ravens 17–7. **Drive: 13 plays, 75 yards, 6:20.**
- PIT – Chris Boswell 41-yard field goal, 4:39. Ravens 17–10. **Drive: 4 plays, −7 yards, 2:03.**
- PIT – Chris Boswell 29-yard field goal, 0:00. Ravens 17–13. **Drive: 3 plays, 14 yards, 0:33.**

**Third quarter**

- PIT – James Conner 1-yard run (Chris Boswell kick), 3:42. Steelers 20–17. **Drive: 10 plays, 87 yards, 4:40.**

**Fourth quarter**

- BAL – Justin Tucker 26-yard field goal, 11:39. Tied 20–20. **Drive: 12 plays, 67 yards, 7:03.**
- PIT – Chris Boswell 33-yard field goal, 2:37. Steelers 23–20. **Drive: 6 plays, 30 yards, 3:28.**
- BAL – Justin Tucker 48-yard field goal, 0:10. Tied 23–23. **Drive: 9 plays, 45 yards, 2:27.**

**Overtime**

- BAL – Justin Tucker 46-yard field goal, 5:26. Ravens 26–23. **Drive: 4 plays, 6 yards, 2:01.**

**Top passers**

- BAL – Lamar Jackson – 19/28, 161 yards, TD, 3 INT
- PIT – Mason Rudolph – 13/20, 131 yards, TD

**Top rushers**

- BAL – Lamar Jackson – 14 rushes, 70 yards
- PIT – James Conner – 14 rushes, 55 yards, TD

**Top receivers**

- BAL – Willie Snead IV – 4 receptions, 51 yards
- PIT – JuJu Smith-Schuster – 7 receptions, 75 yards, TD

After a huge win at home against the Bengals, the Steelers stayed at home for another AFC North duel against the Ravens. In the first quarter, the Ravens went up 3–0 after Justin Tucker kicked a 27-yard field goal. They made it 10–0 after Mark Ingram II ran for a 4-yard touchdown, but the Steelers pulled it back to 10–7 after Mason Rudolph found JuJu Smith-Schuster for a 35-yard touchdown pass. In the second quarter, the Ravens pulled back ahead by double-digits as Marquise Brown caught an 11-yard pass from Lamar Jackson to make it 17–7, but a pair of Chris Boswell field goals from 41 and 29 yards out made it 17–13 going into halftime. The Steelers took the lead in the third quarter when James Conner ran for a 1-yard touchdown to make it 20–17 for the quarter's only score. In the fourth quarter, the Ravens tied it up when Tucker kicked a 26-yard field goal to make it 20–20. The Steelers retook the lead on a 33-yard Boswell field goal to make it 23–20, but the Ravens were able to force overtime when Tucker hit a 48-yard field goal with 10 seconds left in regulation to tie the scores at 23–23. In overtime, the Ravens capitalized on a fumble by Smith-Schuster by nudging into field goal range to allow Tucker to kick the game-winning 46-yarder.

With the loss, the Steelers fell to 1–4. Mason Rudolph suffered a concussion halfway through the third quarter after being hit by Brandon Carr and Earl Thomas, and did not return. Backup quarterback Devlin Hodges took Rudolph's place for the rest of the game.

==== Week 6: at Los Angeles Chargers ====
Week Six: Pittsburgh Steelers at Los Angeles Chargers – Game summary

Quarter	1	2	3	4	Total
**Steelers**	14	7	3	0	**24**
Chargers	0	0	0	17	**17**

at Dignity Health Sports Park, Carson, California

- Date: October 13
- Game time: 5:20 pm. PDT/8:20 pm. EDT
- Game weather: Clear, 71 °F (22 °C)
- Game attendance: 25,425
- Referee: John Hussey
- TV announcers (NBC): Al Michaels, Cris Collinsworth, Michele Tafoya and Terry McAulay
- Recap, Game Book

Game information

**First quarter**

- PIT – Devin Bush Jr. 9-yard fumble return (Chris Boswell kick), 10:51. Steelers 7–0.
- PIT – James Conner 12-yard run (Chris Boswell kick), 4:29. Steelers 14–0. **Drive: 7 plays, 40 yards, 4:23.**

**Second quarter**

- PIT – James Conner 26-yard pass from Devlin Hodges (Chris Boswell kick), 6:34. Steelers 21–0. **Drive: 14 plays, 86 yards, 9:09.**

**Third quarter**

- PIT – Chris Boswell 20-yard field goal, 8:12. Steelers 24–0. **Drive: 13 plays, 73 yards, 6:48.**

**Fourth quarter**

- LAC – Chase McLaughlin 38-yard field goal, 14:00. Steelers 24–3. **Drive: 11 plays, 71 yards, 3:59.**
- LAC – Hunter Henry 5-yard pass from Philip Rivers (Chase McLaughlin kick), 7:13. Steelers 24–10. **Drive: 10 plays, 70 yards, 3:23.**
- LAC – Hunter Henry 11-yard pass from Philip Rivers (Chase McLaughlin kick), 1:29. Steelers 24–17. **Drive: 8 plays, 79 yards, 2:24.**

**Top passers**

- PIT – Devlin Hodges – 15/20, 132 yards, TD, INT
- LAC – Philip Rivers – 26/44, 320 yards, 2 TD, 2 INT

**Top rushers**

- PIT – Benny Snell – 17 rushes, 75 yards
- LAC – Melvin Gordon – 8 rushes, 18 yards

**Top receivers**

- PIT – James Conner – 7 receptions, 78 yards, TD
- LAC – Hunter Henry – 8 receptions, 100 yards, 2 TD

After losing to the Ravens at home, the Steelers traveled west to take on the Chargers in a Sunday Night duel. The Steelers led 24–0 going into the fourth quarter, only for the Chargers to score 17 unanswered points, putting them a touchdown away from tying the game with less than 90 seconds remaining. Although they failed with their onside kick attempt, they forced the Steelers to go three-and-out on their ensuing possession, giving QB Philip Rivers the opportunity to attempt a 99-yard, game-winning drive; however, he was picked off by CB Cameron Sutton, allowing the Steelers to kneel out the clock for a 24–17 win.

With the win, the Steelers went into their bye week at 2–4, and with the Browns' loss to the Seahawks earlier in the day, they moved into a tie for second place in the AFC North.

==== Week 8: vs. Miami Dolphins ====
Week Eight: Miami Dolphins at Pittsburgh Steelers – Game summary

Quarter	1	2	3	4	Total
Dolphins	14	0	0	0	**14**
**Steelers**	0	10	7	10	**27**

at Heinz Field, Pittsburgh, Pennsylvania

- Date: October 28
- Game time: 8:15 pm. EDT
- Game weather: Clear, 59 °F (15 °C)
- Game attendance: 59,244
- Referee: Ronald Torbert
- TV announcers (ESPN): Joe Tessitore, Booger McFarland, Lisa Salters and John Parry
- Recap, Game Book

Game information

**First quarter**

- MIA – Albert Wilson 5-yard pass from Ryan Fitzpatrick (Jason Sanders kick), 10:55. Dolphins 7–0. **Drive: 4 plays, 26 yards, 2:00.**
- MIA – Allen Hurns 12-yard pass from Ryan Fitzpatrick (Jason Sanders kick), 1:34. Dolphins 14–0. **Drive: 11 plays, 63 yards, 6:00.**

**Second quarter**

- PIT – Chris Boswell 42-yard field goal, 2:45. Dolphins 14–3. **Drive: 12 plays, 70 yards, 6:20.**
- PIT – Diontae Johnson 45-yard pass from Mason Rudolph (Chris Boswell kick), 0:17. Dolphins 14–10. **Drive: 6 plays, 50 yards, 0:56.**

**Third quarter**

- PIT – JuJu Smith-Schuster 26-yard pass from Mason Rudolph (Chris Boswell kick), 3:16. Steelers 17–14. **Drive: 12 plays, 97 yards, 7:47.**

**Fourth quarter**

- PIT – James Conner 9-yard run (Chris Boswell kick), 12:01. Steelers 24–14. **Drive: 5 plays, 53 yards, 3:17.**
- PIT – Chris Boswell 41-yard field goal, 5:32. Steelers 27–14. **Drive: 4 plays, −1 yards, 1:41.**

**Top passers**

- MIA – Ryan Fitzpatrick – 21/34, 190 yards, 2 TD, 2 INT
- PIT – Mason Rudolph – 20/36, 251 yards, 2 TD, INT

**Top rushers**

- MIA – Mark Walton – 11 rushes, 35 yards
- PIT – James Conner – 23 rushes, 145 yards, TD

**Top receivers**

- MIA – DeVante Parker – 6 receptions, 59 yards
- PIT – JuJu Smith-Schuster – 5 receptions, 103 yards, TD

Coming off their bye week, the Steelers returned home for a Monday Night Football game against the Dolphins. The Dolphins jumped out to a 14–0 lead in the first quarter, but from the second quarter onwards, it would be all Steelers as they put up 27 unanswered points to seal the victory.

With the win, the Steelers improved to 3–4.

==== Week 9: vs. Indianapolis Colts ====
Week Nine: Indianapolis Colts at Pittsburgh Steelers – Game summary

Quarter	1	2	3	4	Total
Colts	3	13	2	6	**24**
**Steelers**	3	10	7	6	**26**

at Heinz Field, Pittsburgh, Pennsylvania

- Date: November 3
- Game time: 1:00 pm. EST
- Game weather: Partly cloudy, 48 °F (9 °C)
- Game attendance: 61,116
- Referee: Brad Allen
- TV announcers (CBS): Ian Eagle, Dan Fouts and Evan Washburn
- Recap, Game Book

Game information

**First quarter**

- IND – Adam Vinatieri 25-yard field goal, 7:09. Colts 3–0. **Drive: 8 plays, 28 yards, 5:11.**
- PIT – Chris Boswell 21-yard field goal, 0:58. Tied 3–3. **Drive: 11 plays, 72 yards, 6:11.**

**Second quarter**

- IND – Jack Doyle 11-yard pass from Brian Hoyer (Adam Vinatieri kick), 11:57. Colts 10–3. **Drive: 8 plays, 63 yards, 4:01.**
- PIT – Minkah Fitzpatrick 96-yard interception return (Chris Boswell kick), 2:21. Tied 10–10.
- IND – Zach Pascal 14-yard pass from Brian Hoyer (kick blocked), 0:42. Colts 16–10. **Drive: 6 plays, 75 yards, 1:39.**
- PIT – Chris Boswell 51-yard field goal, 0:00. Colts 16–13. **Drive: 6 plays, 47 yards, 0:42.**

**Third quarter**

- PIT – Vance McDonald 7-yard pass from Mason Rudolph (Chris Boswell kick), 5:25. Steelers 20–16. **Drive: 11 plays, 54 yards, 5:15.**
- IND – Alejandro Villanueva tackled in end zone by Justin Houston, 1:05. Steelers 20–18.

**Fourth quarter**

- PIT – Chris Boswell 33-yard field goal, 14:57. Steelers 23–18. **Drive: 4 plays, 2 yards, 1:01.**
- IND – Chester Rogers 4-yard pass from Brian Hoyer (pass failed), 8:43. Colts 24–23. **Drive: 7 plays, 30 yards, 3:12.**
- PIT – Chris Boswell 26-yard field goal, 6:36. Steelers 26–24. **Drive: 6 plays, 67 yards, 2:07.**

**Top passers**

- IND – Brian Hoyer – 17/26, 168 yards, 3 TD, INT
- PIT – Mason Rudolph – 26/35, 191 yards, TD, INT

**Top rushers**

- IND – Marlon Mack – 21 rushes, 89 yards
- PIT – Trey Edmunds – 12 rushes, 73 yards

**Top receivers**

- IND – Zach Pascal – 5 receptions, 76 yards, TD
- PIT – Jaylen Samuels – 13 receptions, 73 yards

The Steelers stayed home for a game against the Colts. In the first quarter, the Colts scored first when Adam Vinatieri kicked a 25-yard field goal to make it 3–0. The Steelers tied it up when Chris Boswell kicked a 21-yard field goal to make it 3–3. In the second quarter, the Colts moved back into the lead when Brian Hoyer found Jack Doyle on an 11-yard pass to make it 10–3. Though, the Steelers tied the game up again when Minkah Fitzpatrick returned an interception 96 yards for a touchdown to make it 10–10. The Colts regained the lead when Hoyer found Zach Pascal on a 14-yard pass (with a failed PAT) to make it 16–10. The Steelers drew closer when Boswell kicked a 51-yard field goal to make it 16–13 at halftime. In the third quarter, the Steelers took the lead when Mason Rudolph found Vance McDonald on a 7-yard pass to make it 20–16. The Colts then came with 2 when Alejandro Villanueva was sacked in the end zone for a safety by Justin Houston, making the score 20–18. The Steelers moved slightly further ahead in the fourth quarter when Boswell kicked a 33-yard field goal to make it 23–18. Though, the Colts regained the lead when Chester Rogers caught a 4-yard pass (with a failed 2-point conversion) from Brian Hoyer to make the score 24–23. Boswell then got the Steelers the lead back when he kicked a 26-yard field goal to make it 26–24. Getting the ball back with just under 90 seconds left, Vinatieri missed the potential game-winning field goal. This allowed the Steelers to kneel out for victory.

With the win, the Steelers improved to 4–4.

==== Week 10: vs. Los Angeles Rams ====
Week Ten: Los Angeles Rams at Pittsburgh Steelers – Game summary

Quarter	1	2	3	4	Total
Rams	7	0	3	2	**12**
**Steelers**	7	7	0	3	**17**

at Heinz Field, Pittsburgh, Pennsylvania

- Date: November 10
- Game time: 4:25 pm. EST
- Game weather: Clear, 55 °F (13 °C)
- Game attendance: 63,627
- Referee: Shawn Smith
- TV announcers (Fox): Chris Myers, Daryl Johnston and Laura Okmin
- Recap, Game Book

Game information

**First quarter**

- LAR – Dante Fowler 26-yard fumble return (Greg Zuerlein kick), 14:46. Rams 7–0.
- PIT – James Washington 3-yard pass from Mason Rudolph (Chris Boswell kick), 0:34. Tied 7–7. **Drive: 9 plays, 82 yards, 4:14.**

**Second quarter**

- PIT – Minkah Fitzpatrick 43-yard fumble return (Chris Boswell kick), 1:44. Steelers 14–7.

**Third quarter**

- LAR – Greg Zuerlein 30-yard field goal, 0:11. Steelers 14–10. **Drive: 11 plays, 76 yards, 5:32.**

**Fourth quarter**

- LAR – Mason Rudolph sacked in end zone by Aaron Donald and Clay Matthews III, 12:40. Steelers 14–12.
- PIT – Chris Boswell 33-yard field goal, 2:46. Steelers 17–12. **Drive: 14 plays, 60 yards, 8:00.**

**Top passers**

- LAR – Jared Goff – 22/41, 243 yards, 2 INT
- PIT – Mason Rudolph – 22/38, 242 yards, TD

**Top rushers**

- LAR – Todd Gurley – 12 rushes, 73 yards
- PIT – Jaylen Samuels – 14 rushes, 29 yards

**Top receivers**

- LAR – Gerald Everett – 8 receptions, 68 yards
- PIT – James Washington – 6 receptions, 90 yards, TD

After a tough home win, the Steelers stayed home for a game against the Rams. The Rams scored first in the first quarter when Dante Fowler returned a fumble 26 yards for a touchdown to make it 7–0. The Steelers, however, tied the game up later on in the quarter when Mason Rudolph found James Washington on a 3-yard pass to make it 7–7. In the second quarter, the Steelers took the lead when Minkah Fitzpatrick returned a fumble 43 yards for a touchdown to make it 14–7 at halftime. In the third quarter, the Rams drew closer when Greg Zuerlein kicked a 30-yard field goal to make it 14–10. In the fourth quarter, they came even closer when Aaron Donald sacked Rudolph in the end zone for a safety to make it 14–12. The Steelers moved slightly further ahead as Chris Boswell kicked a 33-yard field goal. Going back and forth for the remainder of the quarter, later on, the Rams' defense forced the Steelers to go 3 and out. However, they had already used up their time outs. Jared Goff attempted a comeback within the final seconds of the game only to be intercepted by Fitzpatrick sealing the 17–12 win for the Steelers.

With their fourth straight win, the Steelers improved to 5–4.

==== Week 11: at Cleveland Browns ====
Week Eleven: Pittsburgh Steelers at Cleveland Browns – Game summary

Quarter	1	2	3	4	Total
Steelers	0	0	7	0	**7**
**Browns**	7	7	0	7	**21**

at FirstEnergy Stadium, Cleveland, Ohio

- Date: November 14
- Game time: 8:20 pm. EST
- Game weather: Cold, 36 °F (2 °C)
- Game attendance: 67,431
- Referee: Clete Blakeman
- TV announcers (Fox/NFLN/Amazon Prime): Joe Buck, Troy Aikman, Erin Andrews and Kristina Pink
- Recap, Game Book

Game information

**First quarter**

- CLE – Baker Mayfield 1-yard run (Austin Seibert kick), 11:07. Browns 7–0. **Drive: 5 plays, 65 yards, 2:12.**

**Second quarter**

- CLE – Jarvis Landry 1-yard pass from Baker Mayfield (Austin Seibert kick), 9:55. Browns 14–0. **Drive: 7 plays, 77 yards, 4:03.**

**Third quarter**

- PIT – Jaylen Samuels 3-yard pass from Mason Rudolph (Chris Boswell kick), 5:39. Browns 14–7. **Drive: 5 plays, 87 yards, 2:32.**

**Fourth quarter**

- CLE – Stephen Carlson 8-yard pass from Baker Mayfield (Austin Seibert kick), 5:25. Browns 21–7. **Drive: 3 plays, 4 yards, 0:57.**

**Top passers**

- PIT – Mason Rudolph – 23/44, 221 yards, TD, 4 INT
- CLE – Baker Mayfield – 17/32, 193 yards, 2 TD

**Top rushers**

- PIT – Jaylen Samuels – 5 rushes, 26 yards
- CLE – Nick Chubb – 27 carries, 92 yards

**Top receivers**

- PIT – James Washington – 3 receptions, 49 yards
- CLE – Odell Beckham Jr. – 4 receptions, 60 yards

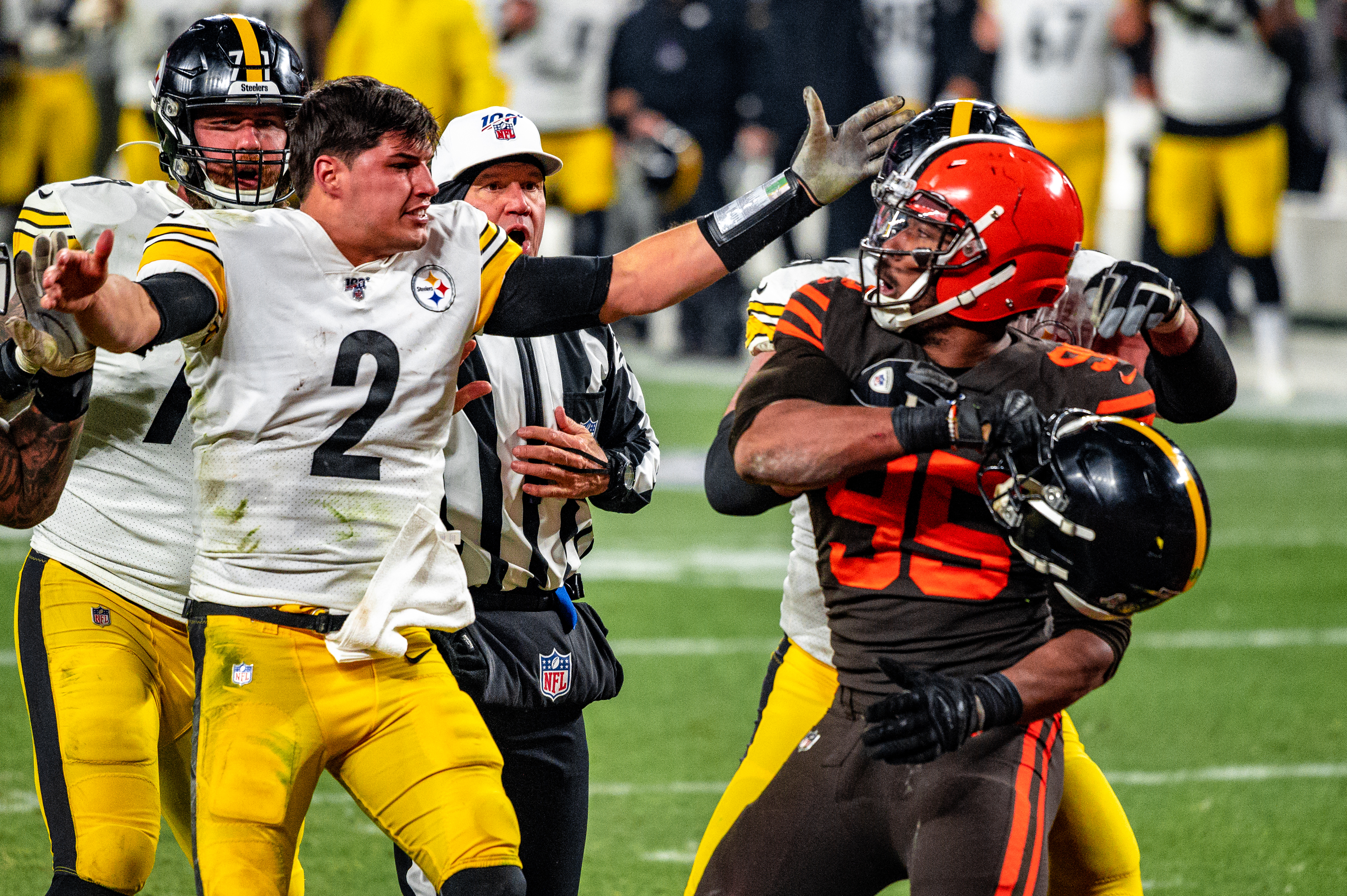
Mason Rudolph reacting to being hit in the head by Myles Garrett with his own helmet.

Coming off the Week 10 win against the Rams, the Steelers traveled to Cleveland to take on the 3–6 Browns. Baker Mayfield scored the first points on a 1-yard touchdown run in the first quarter. The next score came in the second quarter, with a 1-yard touchdown catch by Jarvis Landry. The Steelers struck back in the third quarter with a touchdown completion by Steelers running back Jaylen Samuels, but with an additional touchdown in the fourth quarter by Browns rookie tight end Stephen Carlson, Cleveland held off the Steelers for the win.

Despite completing 23 out of 44 pass attempts for 221 yards and a touchdown, Rudolph was sacked four times for 43 lost yards, and was intercepted four times. Though they had 18 first downs to the Browns' 17, the Steelers failed to convert on three fourth-down opportunities. Chris Boswell also missed a 44-yard field goal attempt in the first quarter.

A skirmish broke out between the two teams in the closing seconds of the game. After passing to Trey Edmunds, Steelers quarterback Mason Rudolph found himself dragged down by Browns defensive end Myles Garrett. Rudolph shoved Garrett while the two were still on the ground, seemingly unhappy with how he was tackled. When the two were back on their feet, Garrett ripped off Rudolph's helmet and took a swing, hitting Rudolph on the head with his own helmet before getting pushed away by Steelers guard David DeCastro. Browns' linebacker Larry Ogunjobi pushed Rudolph from behind, while Steelers center Maurkice Pouncey retaliated with throwing several punches and kicks at Garrett's head. After order was restored, Garrett, Ogunjobi, and Pouncey were ejected for their roles in the fight.

After the game, Garrett, Ogunjobi, and Pouncey were suspended without pay for fighting. Garrett was suspended indefinitely and was also fined $45,623. Garrett filed for an appeal, but was rejected by the NFL. Garrett was later reinstated by the NFL on February 12, 2020. Pouncey was suspended for three games and fined $35,096 for the kicks and punches to Garrett's head. Pouncey filed for an appeal, and the NFL reduced his suspension from three games to two. Ogunjobi was suspended for one game and filed for an appeal, in which his $10,527 fine was rescinded. After the game, a total of 33 players were fined. Rudolph was fined $50,000 for his participation in the fight. Steelers safety Minkah Fitzpatrick and Browns wide receiver Jarvis Landry were each fined $3,507 for entering the fighting area. Both the Steelers and Browns organizations were fined $250,000 as well. Garrett claimed to have felt remorse for his actions, stating that he "lost his cool and I regret it". Rudolph called Garrett's move "cowardly and bush league". Browns head coach Freddie Kitchens stated, "That's not who we want to be at the end of the game. That's not who Myles wants to be. That's not who we're gonna be. You have to be able to maintain your composure in times like that. I'm embarrassed. Myles is embarrassed. It's not good. He understands what he did. He understands it's totally unacceptable and we've got to get through it." NFL on Fox commentator Joe Buck cited the incident as "one of the worst things I've ever seen on a professional sports field." Browns quarterback Baker Mayfield voiced displeasure in Garrett's actions, stating: "It's inexcusable. I don't care, rivalry or not, you can't do that. That's kind of the history of what's been going on here lately, hurting yourself. And that's just endangering the other team. It's inexcusable. (Garrett) knows that. I hope he does now."

Following the game, the Cleveland Browns released a statement apologizing to Mason Rudolph as well as the Pittsburgh Steelers organization, stating:

We are extremely disappointed in what transpired last evening at the end of the game. There is no place for that in football, and is not reflective of the core values we thrive for as an organization. We sincerely apologize to Mason Rudolph and the Pittsburgh Steelers. Myles Garrett has been a good teammate and member of our organization and community for the last three years, but his actions last night were completely unacceptable. We understand the consequences from the league for his actions.

— Statement from the Cleveland Browns following the game

With their 4-game winning streak snapped, the Steelers fell to 5–5. They also lost to the Browns for the first time since 2014. Both teams played another game 17 days later in Pittsburgh, with the Steelers winning 20–13.

==== Week 12: at Cincinnati Bengals ====
Week Twelve: Pittsburgh Steelers at Cincinnati Bengals – Game summary

Quarter	1	2	3	4	Total
**Steelers**	0	3	7	6	**16**
Bengals	0	7	3	0	**10**

at Paul Brown Stadium, Cincinnati, Ohio

- Date: November 24
- Game time: 1:00 pm. EST
- Game weather: Partly sunny, 46 °F (8 °C)
- Game attendance: 47,423
- Referee: Adrian Hill
- TV announcers (CBS): Andrew Catalon, James Lofton and John Schriffen
- Recap, Game Book

Game information

**First quarter**

- No scoring plays.

**Second quarter**

- PIT – Chris Boswell 26-yard field goal, 3:21. Steelers 3–0. **Drive: 9 plays, 40 yards, 5:12.**
- CIN – Tyler Boyd 15-yard pass from Ryan Finley. (Randy Bullock kick), 1:55. Bengals 7–3. **Drive: 3 plays, 69 yards, 1:26.**

**Third quarter**

- PIT – James Washington 79-yard pass from Devlin Hodges (Chris Boswell kick), 11:10. Steelers 10–7. **Drive: 3 plays, 83 yards, 1:26.**
- CIN – Randy Bullock 27-yard field goal, 5:07. Tied 10–10. **Drive: 9 plays, 68 yards, 3:03.**

**Fourth quarter**

- PIT – Chris Boswell 47-yard field goal, 11:59. Steelers 13–10. **Drive: 6 plays, 42 yards, 2:21.**
- PIT – Chris Boswell 26-yard field goal, 3:18. Steelers 16–10. **Drive: 7 plays, 35 yards, 1:53.**

**Top passers**

- PIT – Devlin Hodges – 5/11, 118 yards, TD
- CIN – Ryan Finley – 12/26, 192 yards, TD

**Top rushers**

- PIT – Benny Snell – 21 rushes, 98 yards
- CIN – Joe Mixon – 18 rushes, 79 yards

**Top receivers**

- PIT – James Washington – 3 receptions, 98 yards, TD
- CIN – Tyler Boyd – 5 receptions, 101 yards, TD

After a tough loss, the Steelers traveled southwest for Round 2 against the Bengals. After a scoreless first quarter, the Steelers scored first in the second when Chris Boswell kicked a 26-yard field goal for a 3–0 lead. The Bengals took the lead when Ryan Finley found Tyler Boyd on a 15-yard pass to make it 7–3 at halftime. In the third quarter, the Steelers retook the lead when Devlin Hodges, taking over for an ineffective Mason Rudolph, found James Washington on a 79-yard pass to make it 10–7. The Bengals would tie it up when Randy Bullock kicked a 27-yard field goal to make it 10–10. In the fourth quarter, it was all Steelers as Boswell kicked 2 field goals: from 47 and 26 yards out to make the score 13–10 and then 16–10. Later on, the Bengals defense forced the Steelers to punt. However, Ryan Finley would be sacked and fumbled the ball. The Steelers were able to seal the game on a key run from Benny Snell, Jr. From then on, Hodges would kneel out for the Steelers win.

With the win and tenth straight win over the Bengals, the Steelers improved to 6–5.

==== Week 13: vs. Cleveland Browns ====
Week Thirteen: Cleveland Browns at Pittsburgh Steelers – Game summary

Quarter	1	2	3	4	Total
Browns	3	7	0	3	**13**
**Steelers**	0	10	7	3	**20**

at Heinz Field, Pittsburgh, Pennsylvania

- Date: December 1
- Game time: 1:00 pm. EST
- Game weather: Mostly cloudy, 46 °F (8 °C)
- Game attendance: 62,157
- Referee: Clay Martin
- TV announcers (CBS): Ian Eagle, Dan Fouts and Evan Washburn
- Recap, Game Book

Game information

**First quarter**

- CLE – Austin Seibert 31-yard field goal, 7:31. Browns 3–0. **Drive: 13 plays, 62 yards, 7:29.**

**Second quarter**

- CLE – Kareem Hunt 15-yard pass from Baker Mayfield. (Austin Seibert kick), 7:40. Browns 10–0. **Drive: 10 plays, 70 yards, 5:42.**
- PIT – Chris Boswell 39-yard field goal, 2:56. Browns 10–3. **Drive: 10 plays, 62 yards, 4:44.**
- PIT – James Washington 30-yard pass from Devlin Hodges (Chris Boswell kick), 1:00. Tied 10–10. **Drive: 5 plays, 69 yards, 0:48.**

**Third quarter**

- PIT – Benny Snell 1-yard run (Chris Boswell kick), 10:36. Steelers 17–10. **Drive: 7 plays, 69 yards, 4:24.**

**Fourth quarter**

- PIT – Chris Boswell 29-yard field goal, 13:48. Steelers 20–10. **Drive: 10 plays, 35 yards, 6:01.**
- CLE – Austin Seibert 34-yard field goal, 7:30. Steelers 20–13. **Drive: 7 plays, 61 yards, 2:48.**

**Top passers**

- CLE – Baker Mayfield – 18/32, 196 yards, TD, INT
- PIT – Devlin Hodges – 14/21, 212 yards, TD, INT

**Top rushers**

- CLE – Nick Chubb – 16 rushes, 58 yards
- PIT – Benny Snell – 16 rushes, 63 yards, TD

**Top receivers**

- CLE – Jarvis Landry – 6 receptions, 76 yards
- PIT – James Washington – 4 receptions, 111 yards, TD

After another tough win on the road, the Steelers went home for Round 2 against the Browns. In the first quarter, the Browns scored when Austin Seibert kicked a 31-yard field goal to make it 3–0 for the only score. They made it 10–0 in the second quarter when Baker Mayfield found Kareem Hunt on a 15-yard pass. The Steelers, however managed to tie the game up before halftime starting with Chris Boswell's 39-yard field goal to make it 10–3 followed by Devlin Hodges finding James Washington on a 30-yard pass to make it 10–10. In the third quarter, the Steelers took the lead when Benny Snell Jr. ran for a 1-yard touchdown to make it 17–10. In the fourth quarter, the Steelers moved further ahead when Boswell kicked a 29-yard field goal to make it 20–10. Seibert got the Browns within a touchdown when he kicked a 34-yard field goal to make it 20–13. Getting the ball back later on in the quarter, the Browns had an opportunity to drive down the field and tie the game up. However, Steelers CB and former Brown Joe Haden came up with the game-winning interception sealing the game for the Steelers.

With the win, the Steelers improved to 7–5.

==== Week 14: at Arizona Cardinals ====
Week Fourteen: Pittsburgh Steelers at Arizona Cardinals – Game summary

Quarter	1	2	3	4	Total
**Steelers**	10	3	7	3	**23**
Cardinals	0	10	0	7	**17**

at State Farm Stadium, Glendale, Arizona

- Date: December 8
- Game time: 4:25 pm. EST/2:25 p.m. MST
- Game weather: None (retractable roof closed)
- Game attendance: 63,880
- Referee: Ronald Torbert
- TV announcers (CBS): Andrew Catalon, James Lofton and Amanda Balionis
- Recap, Game Book

Game information

**First quarter**

- PIT – Chris Boswell 30-yard field goal, 4:20. Steelers 3–0. **Drive: 13 plays, 66 yards, 8:00.**
- PIT– Diontae Johnson 85-yard punt return. (Chris Boswell kick), 2:52. Steelers 10–0.

**Second quarter**

- ARI – Zane Gonzalez 30-yard field goal, 11:15. Steelers 10–3. **Drive: 9 plays, 22 yards, 4:23.**
- ARI – Charles Clay 5-yard pass from Kyler Murray. (Zane Gonzalez kick), 1:51. Tied 10–10. **Drive: 12 plays, 85 yards, 5:12.**
- PIT – Chris Boswell 37-yard field goal, 0:00. Steelers 13–10. **Drive: 8 plays, 56 yards, 1:51.**

**Third quarter**

- PIT – Diontae Johnson 2-yard pass from Devlin Hodges (Chris Boswell kick), 2:00. Steelers 20–10. **Drive: 10 plays, 73 yards, 6:06.**

**Fourth quarter**

- ARI – David Johnson 24-yard pass from Kyler Murray. (Zane Gonzalez kick), 6:44. Steelers 20–17. **Drive: 3 plays, 32 yards, 1:20.**
- PIT – Chris Boswell 25-yard field goal, 1:42. Steelers 23–17. **Drive: 11 plays, 77 yards, 5:02.**

**Top passers**

- PIT – Devlin Hodges – 16/19, 152 yards, TD
- ARI – Kyler Murray – 20/30, 194 yards, 2 TD, 3 INT

**Top rushers**

- PIT – Benny Snell – 16 rushes, 41 yards
- ARI – Kenyan Drake – 11 rushes, 37 yards

**Top receivers**

- PIT – Diontae Johnson – 6 receptions, 60 yards, TD
- ARI – Christian Kirk – 9 receptions, 85 yards

After a tough home win, the Steelers travelled to Phoenix, Arizona to take on the Cardinals in a rematch of Super Bowl XLIII. In the first quarter, the Steelers made it 3–0 when Chris Boswell kicked a 30-yard field goal. They made it 10–0 when Diontae Johnson returned a punt 85 yards for a touchdown. In the second quarter, the Cards tied the game up when Zane Gonzalez kicked a 30-yard field goal to make it 10–3, followed up by Kyler Murray connecting with Charles Clay on a 5-yard pass to make it 10–10. The Steelers retook the lead before halftime when Boswell kicked on a 37-yard field goal to make it 13–10. The Steelers increased their lead in the third quarter when Devlin Hodges found Johnson on a 2-yard pass to make it 20–10. After a failed fake punt attempt by the Steelers in the fourth, Murray found David Johnson on a 24-yard pass to make it 20–17. The Steelers moved slightly ahead when Boswell kicked a 25-yard field goal to make it 23–17. The Cards got the ball back. Murray would be sacked before a penalty on the Steelers for going offsides. Failing to convert the 3rd down, on 4th down, Murray took a shot down the field to get intercepted by Joe Haden, sealing the win for the Steelers. For the 6th time in 15 years, the Steelers were also denied of a possible losing season for the first time since 2003.

With the win, the Steelers improved to 8–5.

==== Week 15: vs. Buffalo Bills ====
Week Fifteen: Buffalo Bills at Pittsburgh Steelers – Game summary

Quarter	1	2	3	4	Total
**Bills**	0	7	0	10	**17**
Steelers	0	3	7	0	**10**

at Heinz Field, Pittsburgh, Pennsylvania

- Date: December 15
- Game time: 8:20 pm. EST
- Game weather: Cloudy, 31 °F (−1 °C)
- Game attendance: 64,694
- Referee: Tony Corrente
- TV announcers (NBC): Al Michaels, Cris Collinsworth, Michele Tafoya and Terry McAulay
- Recap, Game Book

Game information

**First quarter**

- No scoring plays.

**Second quarter**

- BUF – Josh Allen 1-yard run (Stephen Hauschka kick), 14:22. Bills 7–0. **Drive: 9 plays, 40 yards, 4:23.**
- PIT – Chris Boswell 49-yard field goal, 11:26. Bills 7–3. **Drive: 6 plays, 41 yards, 2:56.**

**Third quarter**

- PIT – James Conner 11-yard pass from Devlin Hodges (Chris Boswell kick), 11:18. Steelers 10–7. **Drive: 7 plays, 69 yards, 3:42.**

**Fourth quarter**

- BUF – Stephen Hauschka 36-yard field goal, 12:23. Tied 10–10. **Drive: 7 plays, 0 yards, 4:01.**
- BUF – Tyler Kroft 14-yard pass from Josh Allen (Stephen Hauschka kick), 7:55. Bills 17–10. **Drive: 6 plays, 70 yards, 2:08.**

**Top passers**

- BUF – Josh Allen – 13/25, 139 yards, TD, INT
- PIT – Devlin Hodges – 23/38, 202 yards, TD, 4 INT

**Top rushers**

- BUF – Devin Singletary – 21 rushes, 87 yards
- PIT – James Conner – 8 rushes, 42 yards

**Top receivers**

- BUF – John Brown – 7 receptions, 99 yards
- PIT – James Washington – 5 receptions, 83 yards

After another tough win, the Steelers went home for a game against the Bills. After a scoreless first quarter, the Bills scored first in the second when Josh Allen ran for a 1-yard touchdown to make it 7–0. Chris Boswell was able to get the Steelers on the board before halftime when he kicked a 49-yard field goal to make it 7–3. In the third quarter, the Steelers moved into the lead when Devlin Hodges found James Conner on an 11-yard pass to make it 10–7 for the quarter's only score. The Bills would tie the game up and then take the lead in the fourth when Stephen Hauschka kicked a 36-yard field goal to make it 10–10 followed by Josh Allen finding Tyler Kroft on a 14-yard pass to make it 17–10. The Steelers had two straight chances to move down the field and tie the game. But Hodges would be intercepted both times. The second interception sealed the loss for the Steelers.

With the loss, the Steelers fell to 8–6. The team also suffered their first-ever loss while wearing their color rush jerseys.

==== Week 16: at New York Jets ====
Week Sixteen: Pittsburgh Steelers at New York Jets – Game summary

Quarter	1	2	3	4	Total
Steelers	0	10	0	0	**10**
**Jets**	7	3	3	3	**16**

at MetLife Stadium, East Rutherford, New Jersey

- Date: December 22
- Game time: 1:00 pm. EST
- Game weather: Sunny and cool, 45 °F (7 °C)
- Game attendance: 78,523
- Referee: Shawn Hochuli
- TV announcers (CBS): Ian Eagle, Dan Fouts and Evan Washburn
- Recap, Game Book

Game information

**First quarter**

- NYJ – Robby Anderson 23-yard pass from Sam Darnold. (Sam Ficken kick), 10:27. Jets 7–0. **Drive: 11 plays, 75 yards, 4:33.**

**Second quarter**

- NYJ – Sam Ficken 54-yard field goal, 14:15. Jets 10–0. **Drive: 7 plays, 23 yards, 2:37.**
- PIT – Chris Boswell 49-yard field goal, 1:18. Jets 10–3. **Drive: 10 plays, 55 yards, 2:24.**
- PIT – Diontae Johnson 29-yard pass from Mason Rudolph. (Chris Boswell kick), 0:04. Tied 10–10. **Drive: 3 plays, 41 yards, 0:24.**

**Third quarter**

- NYJ – Sam Ficken 37-yard field goal, 6:30. Jets 13–10. **Drive: 10 plays, 62 yards, 5:09.**

**Fourth quarter**

- NYJ – Sam Ficken 42-yard field goal, 3:11. Jets 16–10. **Drive: 9 plays, 54 yards, 5:27.**

**Top passers**

- PIT – Mason Rudolph – 14/20, 129 yards, TD
- NYJ – Sam Darnold – 16/26, 183 yards, TD

**Top rushers**

- PIT – James Conner – 6 rushes, 32 yards
- NYJ – Le'Veon Bell – 25 rushes, 72 yards

**Top receivers**

- PIT – Diontae Johnson – 8 receptions, 81 yards, TD
- NYJ – Jamison Crowder – 4 receptions, 60 yards

After losing their last game of the season at home, the Steelers traveled to take on the Jets. In the first quarter the Jets scored when Sam Darnold found Robby Anderson on a 23-yard pass to make it 7–0. They would make it 10–0 after Sam Ficken kicked a 54-yard field goal. After Chris Boswell kicked a 49-yard field goal to make it 10–3, Mason Rudolph found Diontae Johnson on a 29-yard pass to tie the game at 10–10. In the second half, it was all Jets—in the third quarter, Ficken kicked a 37-yard field goal to make it 13–10. In the fourth, the Jets increased their lead when Ficken kicked a 42-yard field goal to make it 16–10. When the Steelers got the ball back, they were unable to complete the comeback, sealing another loss.

With the loss, the Steelers fell to 8–7. They were also overtaken by the Tennessee Titans for the sixth seed in the AFC due to tiebreakers.

==== Week 17: at Baltimore Ravens ====
Week Seventeen: Pittsburgh Steelers at Baltimore Ravens – Game summary

Quarter	1	2	3	4	Total
Steelers	0	7	3	0	**10**
**Ravens**	6	10	0	12	**28**

at M&T Bank Stadium, Baltimore, Maryland

- Date: December 29
- Game time: 4:25 pm. EST
- Game weather: Rain, 46 °F (8 °C)
- Game attendance: 70,695
- Referee: Bill Vinovich
- TV announcers (CBS): Ian Eagle, Dan Fouts and Evan Washburn
- Recap, Game Book

Game information

**First quarter**

- BAL – Justin Tucker 45-yard field goal, 7:56. Ravens 3–0. **Drive: 11 plays, 40 yards, 7:04.**
- BAL – Justin Tucker 22-yard field goal, 2:40. Ravens 6–0. **Drive: 9 plays, 61 yards, 4:24.**

**Second quarter**

- PIT – Benny Snell – 4-yard run (Chris Boswell kick), 12:50. Steelers 7–6 **Drive: 10 plays, 75 yards, 4:50.**
- BAL – Justin Tucker 22-yard field goal, 1:10. Ravens 9–7. **Drive: 9 plays, 56 yards, 4:06.**
- BAL – Justice Hill – 8-yard run (Justin Tucker kick), 0:21. Ravens 16–7 **Drive: 4 plays, 23 yards, 0:24.**

**Third quarter**

- PIT – Chris Boswell 26-yard field goal, 9:55. Ravens 16–10. **Drive: 7 plays, 26 yards, 3:21.**

**Fourth quarter**

- BAL – Justin Tucker 47-yard field goal, 13:29. Ravens 19–10. **Drive: 8 plays, 34 yards, 4:13.**
- BAL – Jordan Richards fumble recovery in end zone (Justin Tucker kick), 4:36. Ravens 26–10.
- BAL – Penalty on Devlin Hodges enforced in end zone for a safety, 4:21. Ravens 28–10.
- PIT – Devlin Hodges – 9/25, 95 yards
- BAL – Robert Griffin III – 11/21, 96 yards, INT

**Top rushers**

- PIT – Benny Snell – 18 rushes, 91 yards, TD
- BAL – Gus Edwards – 21 rushes, 130 yards

**Top receivers**

- PIT – Diontae Johnson – 4 receptions, 54 yards
- BAL – Hayden Hurst – 2 receptions, 35 yards

The Steelers ended their season on the road for Round 2 against the Ravens. On a rain soaked field, with Robert Griffin III at quarterback, the Ravens kept the ball on the ground for their first drive. The drive covered 40 yards, took 7 minutes off the clock and culminated with a 45-yard Justin Tucker field goal. After the Ravens defense forced a three-and-out, the Ravens offense, highlighted by a Gus Edwards 38-yard run, drove down the field again, this time settling for a Tucker 22-yard field goal. The Steelers took the lead early in the second quarter after a Benny Snell 4-yard touchdown run. The Ravens regained the lead, 9–7, with another Tucker field goal with 1:10 remaining in the half. The Ravens got the ball back with 54 seconds left in the half when Matthew Judon sacked Steeler quarterback Devlin Hodges forcing him to fumble. Justice Hill's 8-yard touchdown run capped a Ravens 23-yard drive and the half ended with the Ravens leading 16–7. After the teams exchanged field goals, the Ravens defense, late in the fourth quarter, stripped the ball from Steeler's punter Jordan Berry and recovered it in the end zone for a touchdown. On the next Steelers possession the Ravens were awarded 2 points after Hodges was called for intentional grounding in the end zone, making the final score 28–10.

With the loss, the Steelers finished their season 8–8 and were eliminated from playoff contention. They were also swept by the Ravens for the first time since 2015. Even if the Steelers had won, they still would have been eliminated from playoff contention due to the Tennessee Titans defeating the Houston Texans 35–14 that afternoon.

=== Standings ===
==== Division ====
AFC North
	W	L	T	PCT	DIV	CONF	PF	PA	STK
^{(1)} Baltimore Ravens	14	2	0	.875	5–1	10–2	531	282	W12
Pittsburgh Steelers	8	8	0	.500	3–3	6–6	289	303	L3
Cleveland Browns	6	10	0	.375	3–3	6–6	335	393	L3
Cincinnati Bengals	2	14	0	.125	1–5	2–10	279	420	W1

==== Conference ====
AFC
#	Team	Division	W	L	T	PCT	DIV	CONF	SOS	SOV	STK
**Division leaders**
1	Baltimore Ravens	North	14	2	0	.875	5–1	10–2	.494	.484	W12
2 (Note: Kansas City claimed the No. 2 seed over New England based on head-to-head victory.)	Kansas City Chiefs	West	12	4	0	.750	6–0	9–3	.510	.477	W6
3	New England Patriots	East	12	4	0	.750	5–1	8–4	.469	.411	L1
4	Houston Texans	South	10	6	0	.625	4–2	8–4	.520	.488	L1
**Wild Cards**
5	Buffalo Bills	East	10	6	0	.625	3–3	7–5	.461	.363	L2
6	Tennessee Titans	South	9	7	0	.563	3–3	7–5	.488	.465	W1
**Did not qualify for the postseason**
7	Pittsburgh Steelers	North	8	8	0	.500	3–3	6–6	.502	.324	L3
8 (Note: Denver finished ahead of Indianapolis and NY Jets based on conference record. Division tiebreak was initially used to eliminate Oakland (see below).) (Note: Denver finished ahead of Oakland based on conference record.)	Denver Broncos	West	7	9	0	.438	3–3	6–6	.510	.406	W2
9 (Note: Oakland and Indianapolis finished ahead of NY Jets based on conference record.) (Note: Oakland finished ahead of Indianapolis based on head-to-head victory.)	Oakland Raiders	West	7	9	0	.438	3–3	5–7	.482	.335	L1
10	Indianapolis Colts	South	7	9	0	.438	3–3	5–7	.492	.500	L1
11	New York Jets	East	7	9	0	.438	2–4	4–8	.473	.402	W2
12 (Note: Jacksonville finished ahead of Cleveland based on record against common opponents. Jacksonville's cumulative record against Cincinnati, Denver, NY Jets, and Tennessee was 4–1, compared to Cleveland's 2–3 cumulative record against the same four teams.)	Jacksonville Jaguars	South	6	10	0	.375	2–4	6–6	.484	.406	W1
13	Cleveland Browns	North	6	10	0	.375	3–3	6–6	.533	.479	L3
14 (Note: LA Chargers finished ahead of Miami based on head-to-head victory.)	Los Angeles Chargers	West	5	11	0	.313	0–6	3–9	.514	.488	L3
15	Miami Dolphins	East	5	11	0	.313	2–4	4–8	.484	.463	W2
16	Cincinnati Bengals	North	2	14	0	.125	1–5	2–10	.553	.406	W1
**Tiebreakers** (Note: When breaking ties for three or more teams under the NFL's rules, they are first broken within divisions, then comparing only the highest ranked remaining team from each division.)
