= Gulf states =

Gulf states may refer to:

- Member states of the Gulf Cooperation Council: Bahrain, Kuwait, Oman, Qatar, Saudi Arabia and the United Arab Emirates
- Arab states of the Persian Gulf: six states above plus Iraq
- Gulf Coast of the United States: Alabama, Florida, Louisiana, Mississippi and Texas

== See also ==
- Gulf (disambiguation)
