= East Chambers Independent School District =

School district in Texas, United States

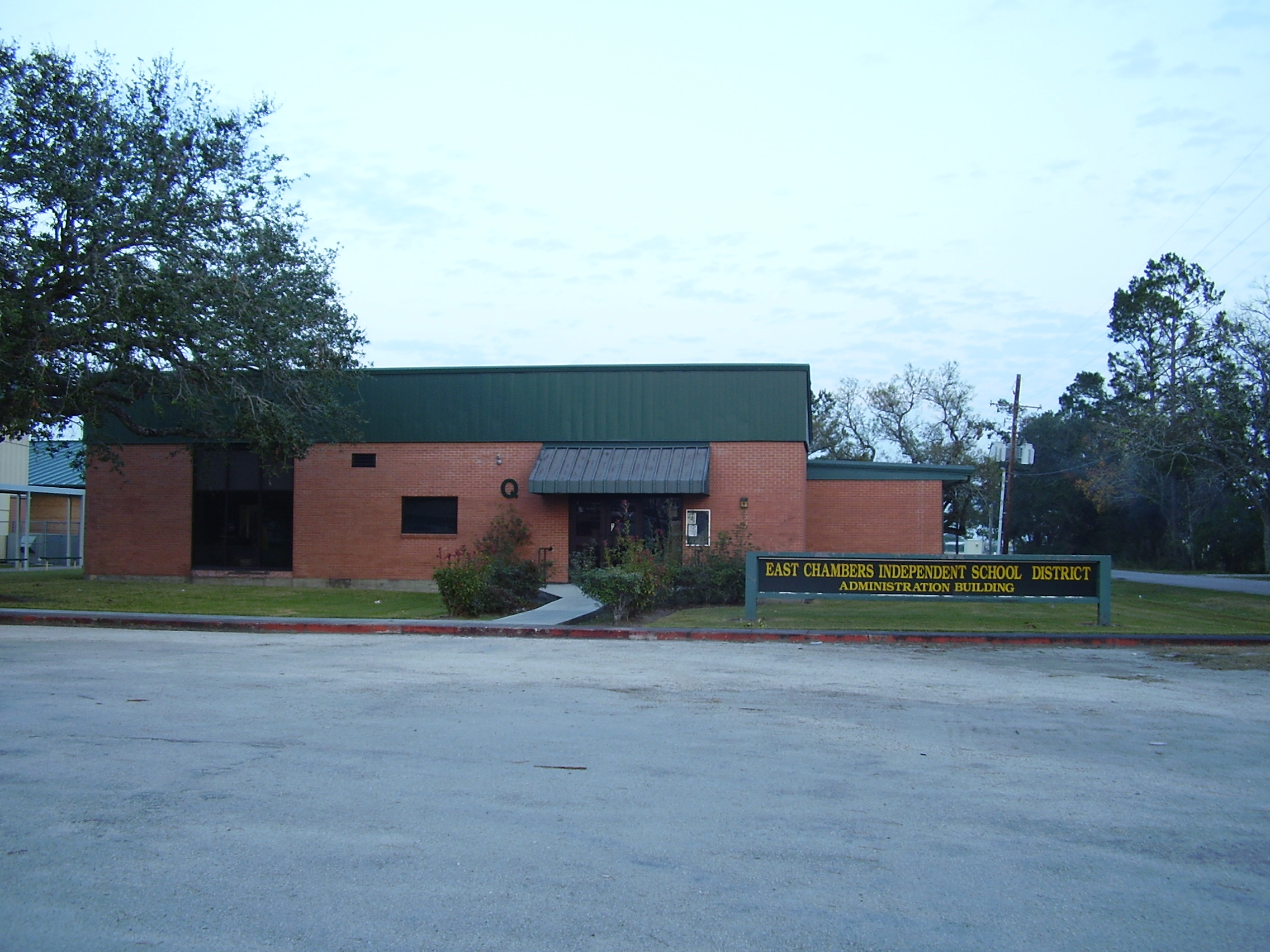
- East Chambers Independent School District administration building

Address
- 216 Champions Loop Winnie, Texas, 77665; United States

District information
- Type: Public
- Grades: PK–12
- Schools: 4
- NCES District ID: 4817880

Students and staff
- Students: 1,563 (2023–2024)
- Teachers: 116.16 (on an FTE basis) (2023–2024)
- Staff: 96.32 (on an FTE basis) (2023–2024)
- Student–teacher ratio: 13.46 (2023–2024)

Other information
- Website: www.eastchambers.net

East Chambers Independent School District is a public school district based in the community of Winnie in unincorporated Chambers County, Texas (USA). The school colors are green and gold, and the mascot is the buccaneer.

The school district has four campuses: a primary, an elementary, junior high, and high school campus. These schools serve the communities of Winnie, Stowell, and Seabreeze.

In 2009, the school district was rated "academically acceptable" by the Texas Education Agency.

== Schools ==
=== Secondary ===
- East Chambers High School (Grades 9-12)
- East Chambers Junior High (Grades 6-8)

=== Primary ===
- East Chambers Elementary (3-5)
- East Chambers Primary (PK-2)

== Gallery ==
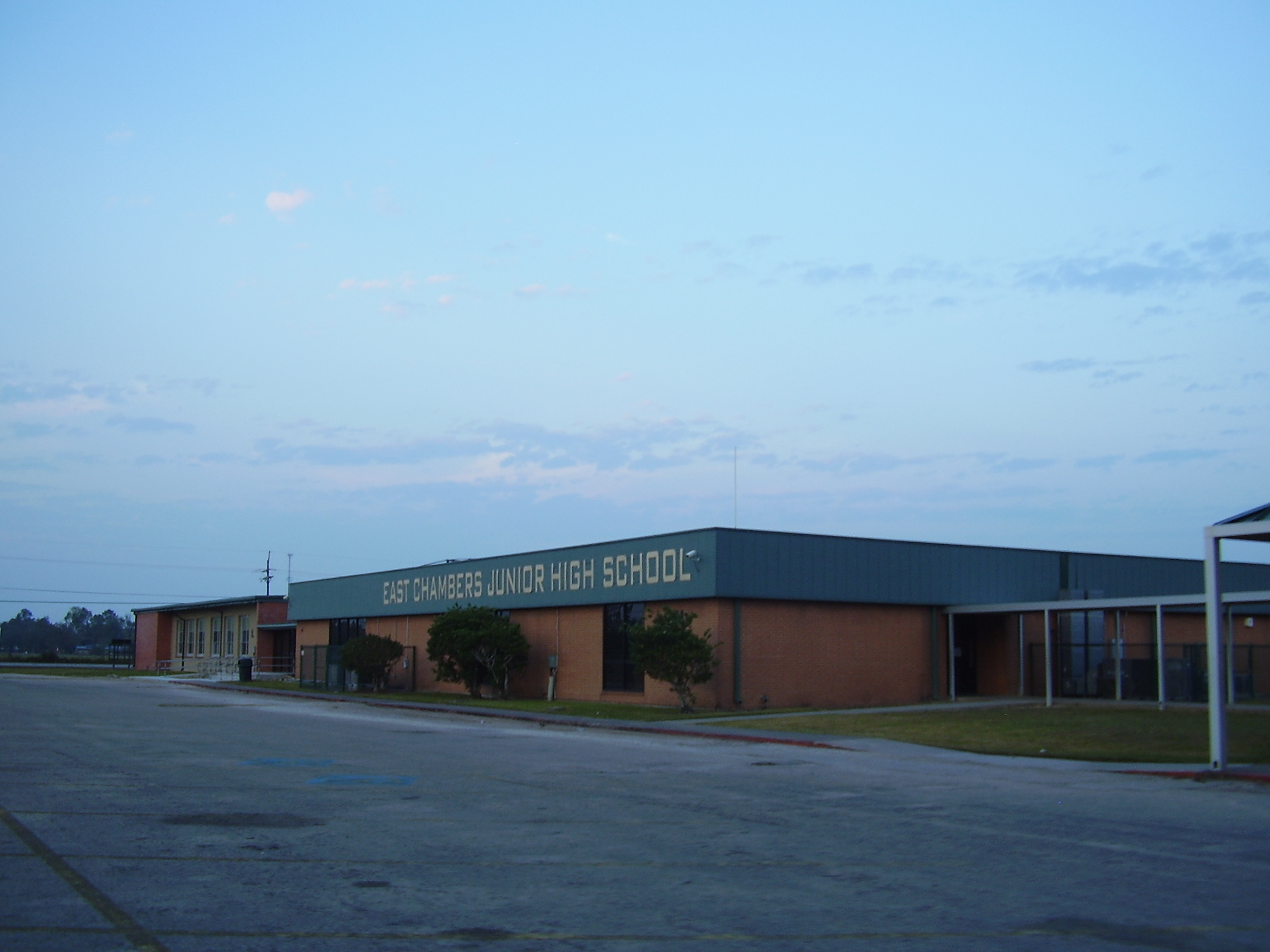
East Chambers Junior High School
