= Gulf breeze =

Gulf breeze may refer to:

- Gulf Breeze (train), (1989–1995) Amtrak train in Alabama between Birmingham and Mobile
- Gulf Breeze, Florida, USA; a city in Santa Rosa County
- Gulf Breeze High School, a public High School in Gulf Breeze, Florida
- Gulf Breeze Library, a library in Gulf Breeze, Florida
- Gulf Breeze Middle School, a public middle school in Gulf Breeze, Florida
- Gulf Breeze Zoo, a zoo in Woodlawn Beach, Florida

== See also ==
- Bay breeze (disambiguation)
- breeze (disambiguation)
- Gulf (disambiguation)
- Third Gulf Breeze, archaeological site in Gulf Breeze, Santa Rosa, Florida, USA
