= Golf (disambiguation) =

Golf is a sport.

Golf or GOLF may also refer to:

== Games ==
- Golf (billiards), a pocket billiards game that allows more than two people to play
- Golf (card game), a card game where players try to earn the lowest number of points
- Golf (patience), a solitaire card game
- Golf (1979 video game), released by Magnavox for the Videopac console
- Golf (1980 video game), released for the Atari 2600
- Golf (1984 video game), released by Nintendo in 1984 for the Nintendo Entertainment System
- Golf (1995 video game), released for Virtual Boy game console, and published by T&E Soft in Japan and published by Nintendo in North America

== Media ==
- Golf (film), a 1922 film starring Oliver Hardy
- Golf Channel, an American cable TV network focused on the sport of golf
- Golf Magazine, a monthly golf magazine
- "Golf" (Don't Wait Up), a 1988 television episode

== Places ==
- Golf, Florida, a village in Palm Beach County
- Golf, Illinois, a village in Cook County, Illinois
  - Golf station, a commuter rail station in Golf, Illinois
- Golf Naselje, a neighborhood of Belgrade, Serbia

== Other uses ==
- Volkswagen Golf, a car model built by the German manufacturer Volkswagen
- Golf-class submarine, used by the Soviet Navy
- Golf Wang, an American clothing company founded by Tyler, the Creator
- Global Oscillations at Low Frequencies, an instrument used by the Solar and Heliospheric Observatory
- Code word for the letter G in the NATO spelling alphabet
- GOLF, the public trading ticker symbol for Acushnet Company
- Golf Hill, a historic homestead in Victoria, Australia

== See also ==
- Perl golf, a game involving the Perl programming language
- Word golf, a word game
- Code golf, a competition by programmers to write the least amount of code necessary to implement a particular algorithm
- Disc golf, or frisbee golf
- Miniature golf, minigolf or crazy golf
- Gulf (disambiguation)
