= Gulf FM =

Gulf FM may refer to:

- Radio 4 News FM, a rolling news service broadcast by the BBC during the Gulf War
- Gulf FM (Australia) (ACMA callsign: 5GFM), a community radio station based on the Yorke Peninsula, South Australia
