= Gulf Building =

There are many buildings called the Gulf Building. Among them:

- Gulf Building (Houston) – formerly the Humble Building
- Gulf Tower – Pittsburgh, Pennsylvania

Formerly named Gulf Building

- 1515 Poydras, New Orleans, Louisiana
