= Hawaiian sea breeze =

Hawaiian Sea Breeze may refer to:

- "Hawaiian Sea Breeze", a song written by Skeets Mcdonald
- Bay Breeze or Hawaiian Sea Breeze, a cocktail made from vodka, cranberry juice, and pineapple juice
