= Costa del Sol (disambiguation) =

Costa del Sol may refer to:

- Costa del Sol, a coastal region in Málaga Province, Andalusia, Spain
- Costa del Sol Occidental, a comarca in western coastal Málaga Province
- Costa del Sol Oriental, the eastern sector of the Costa del Sol, part of the comarca Axarquía-Costa del Sol
- Costa del Sol Trophy, an exhibition international club football tournament played in Costa del Sol
- Costa Del Sol Nairi's, a Belizean football team
- Drug Squad: Costa del Sol, a 2019 Spanish TV series
- Costa del Sol, a fictional location in the 1997 video game Final Fantasy VII and a fictional location in the 2013 video game Final Fantasy XIV: A Realm Reborn

== See also ==
- Suncoast
