= Gulf Cup for Veteran Players =

Regional association football tournament

- Organiser(s): Gulf Football Federation (GFF)
- Founded: 2025; 1 year ago
- Teams: 8
- Current champions: Iraq (2nd title)
- Most championships: Iraq (2 titles)
- Website: the-gff.com

The Gulf Cup for Veteran Players (Arabic: كأس الخليج لقدامى اللاعبين) is an exhibition association football tournament governed by the Gulf Football Federation for its eight member nations. The tournament is contested by retired players that have participated in previous Arabian Gulf Cup tournaments. The reigning champions are Iraq, who won their second consecutive title in 2026.

== History ==
The tournament was first suggested by Omani journalist Salih Albahri. Rumours about the launch of the tournament began circulating in September 2024, three months before Kuwait was set to host the 26th Arabian Gulf Cup. On 30 January 2025, the AGCFF (now known as the GFF) announced the format and dates for the first tournament to be hosted by Kuwait, and also announced that the tournament would be held biennially in conjunction with the Arabian Gulf Cup tournament, in the same host country.

== Format and rules ==
The tournament follows the same format as the Arabian Gulf Cup, where the eight teams are divided into two groups of four, with the top two teams in each group advancing to the semi-final. All players participating in the tournament must be retired or over the age of 40 and must have taken part in at least one previous edition of the Arabian Gulf Cup. Matches consist of two halves of 20 minutes each, with no limits on substitutions. If a match in the knockout stage ends in a draw after 40 minutes, a penalty shoot-out takes place.

== Results ==
Ed.	Year	Host	Final			Losing semi-finalists
Ed.	Year	Host	(gold) Champion	Score	(silver) Runner-up	Losing semi-finalists
1	2025	Kuwait	Iraq	0–0 (4–3 p)	Oman	Bahrain and Qatar
2	2026	Qatar	Iraq	0–0 (4–3 p)	Saudi Arabia	Bahrain and Qatar

== See also ==
- Arabian Gulf Cup
