= Gulf University =

Gulf University may refer to:

- Gulf University, Bahrain, university in Sanad, Bahrain
- Gulf University for Science and Technology, located in Kuwait
- Florida Gulf Coast University, located in the United States
- Persian Gulf University, a public university located in Bushehr, Iran
- Arabian Gulf University, located in Manama, Bahrain
- Gulf Medical University, a university in Ajman, the United Arab Emirates
- Al-Shahba University, a university in Aleppo, Syria, formerly known as the Gulf University
