= Seabreeze, Texas =

Unincorporated community in Texas, US

Coordinates: 29°43′16″N 94°22′26″W

Seabreeze is an unincorporated community in Chambers County, Texas, United States.

== Education ==
East Chambers Independent School District operates schools in the area.
