= East Chambers High School =

Location
- 234 East Buccaneer Drive; Winnie, Texas 77665; United States; 29.804812°N 94.381416°W

Information
- Other name: ECHS
- Type: Public high school
- School district: East Chambers Independent School District
- NCES District ID: 4817880
- Educational authority: Texas Education Agency
- Superintendent: Scott Campbell
- CEEB code: 447605
- NCES School ID: 481788001561
- Principal: Justin Lezak
- Teaching staff: 32.75 (FTE)
- Grades: 9-12
- Gender: Coeducational
- Enrollment: 447 (2024-2025)
  - Grade 9: 106
  - Grade 10: 124
  - Grade 11: 113
  - Grade 12: 104
- Student to teacher ratio: 13.65
- Colors: Green and gold
- Athletics conference: UIL Class 3A
- Team name: Buccaneers
- Website: www.eastchambers.net/o/high

East Chambers High School, also abbreviated as ECHS, is a public high school located in Winnie, Texas (USA). It is the sole high school in the East Chambers Independent School District and is classified as a 3A school by the UIL. For the 2021-2022 school year, the school was given a "B" by the Texas Education Agency.

== Athletics ==
The East Chambers Buccaneers compete in the following sports:

- Baseball
- Basketball
- Cross Country
- Football
- Golf
- Powerlifting
- Soccer
- Softball
- Tennis
- Track and Field
- Volleyball
