= Gulf Coast (disambiguation) =

Gulf Coast commonly refers to:

- Gulf Coast of the United States, the coastline of the US along the Gulf of Mexico
  - Mississippi Gulf Coast, region of southern Mississippi
  - Texas Gulf Coast, region of southeast Texas
- Gulf Coast of Mexico, the coastline of Mexico along the Gulf of Mexico

Gulf Coast may also refer to:

- Gulf Coast (magazine), a literary magazine from Houston, Texas
- Gulf Coast (train), a planned Amtrak train service in Louisiana, Mississippi, and Alabama
- Gulf Coast League, a rookie-level Minor League Baseball league
- Gulf Coast State College, a public college in Panama City, Florida
- "The Gulf Coast", a song by Bug Hunter from the album The Rough Draft

== See also ==
- Gulf (disambiguation)
