= Operation Sea Breeze (Sri Lanka) =

Sri Lankan amphibious operation

- Part of Sri Lankan Civil War
Date	September 1990
Location	Mullaitivu, northern Sri Lanka
Result	Sri Lankan Military victory

Belligerents
Sri Lanka	Liberation Tigers of Tamil Eelam

Commanders and leaders
Major General (later Lieutenant General) Denzil Kobbekaduwa, Brigadier (later Major General) Vijaya Wimalaratne	Velupillai Prabhakaran

Units involved
Sri Lanka Armed Forces; Sri Lanka Army; Armoured Corps; Sri Lanka Navy; SLNS Sooraya; SLNS Weeraya; SLNS Kandula; SLNS Pabbatha	Liberation Tigers of Tamil Eelam

Operation Sea Breeze was a combined military operation launched by the Sri Lanka Armed Forces in Mullaitivu. It was the first amphibious operation launched by the Sri Lankan military in its history. The operation was carried out to break the siege and reinforce the Sri Lanka Army camp in Mullaitivu. It was successfully carried out and the area controlled by the camp was extended.

The isolated army camp of a company strength came under intense attack by the LTTE in June 1990. In an attempt to reinforce the besieged camp Major General Denzil Kobbekaduwa, Overall Operations Commander, Eastern Sector immediately executed Operation Sea Breeze. The fast gun boats of the Sri Lanka Navy, SLNS Sooraya and SLNS Weeraya moved in close and provided naval gun fire to suppress LTTE gun points along the coast, covering SLNS Kandula and SLNS Pabbatha to beach three nautical miles north of Mulaitivu and land troops.
