= Gulf Football Federation =

Regional football body

- الاتحاد الخليجي لكرة القدم
- Formation: 21 May 2016; 10 years ago
- Type: Football Federation
- Headquarters: Doha, Qatar
- Members: 8 member associations
- Official language: Arabic
- Secretary General: Jassim Sultan Al‑Rumaihi
- Presidents: Hamad Bin Khalifa Bin Ahmed Al-Thani
- Website: the-gff.com

The Gulf Football Federation (GFF; Arabic: الاتحاد الخليجي لكرة القدم) is an independent regional football body for eight member countries, those being the member states of the Gulf Cooperation Council (Bahrain, Kuwait, Oman, Qatar, Saudi Arabia and the United Arab Emirates), as well as Iraq and Yemen. It was established in May 2016, and its main competition is the Arabian Gulf Cup.

== History ==
Several preparatory meetings were held in 2015. The federation then was founded in 2016 as Arab Gulf Cup Football Federation to reflect the region's oldest competition: the Arabian Gulf Cup. Sheikh Hamad Bin Khalifa Bin Ahmed Al Thani of Qatar was named as the first president. In 2026, the federation was renamed to Gulf Football Federation.

== Member associations ==
National Association	Year Joined
Bahrain	2016
Iraq	2016
Kuwait	2016
Oman	2016
Qatar	2016
Saudi Arabia	2016
United Arab Emirates	2016
Yemen	2016

== Competitions ==
The GFF organises the Arabian Gulf Cup for national football teams, which is held every two years, and the GFF Gulf Club Champions League for club teams, which is held every season. The possibility of holding a women's competition in the future has also been discussed.

=== Current title holders ===
Competition	Year	Champions	Title	Runners-up	Next edition	Dates
National teams
Arabian Gulf Cup	2026	Saudi Arabia	4th	United Arab Emirates	2028	9–22 December 2028
Gulf Cup for Veteran Players	2026	Iraq	2nd	Saudi Arabia	TBD	TBD
U-23 Gulf Cup	2025	Saudi Arabia	5th	Iraq	TBD	TBD
U-20 Gulf Cup	2025	Saudi Arabia	2nd	Yemen	TBD	TBD
U-17 Gulf Cup	2026	Egypt	1st	United Arab Emirates	TBD	TBD
Club teams
Gulf Club Champions League	2025–26	(Qatar) Al-Rayyan	1st	(Saudi Arabia) Al-Shabab	2026–27	13 October 2026 – 30 April 2027
Gulf Club Super Cup	—				2026	TBD

== Rankings ==
=== Men's national teams ===
Rankings are calculated by FIFA.

FIFA Men's Rankings (as of 19 December 2024)
GFF*	FIFA	+/-	National Team	Points
1	48	Steady	Qatar	1474.60
2	56	Steady	Iraq	1442.86
3	59	Steady	Saudi Arabia	1406.56
4	63	Steady	United Arab Emirates	1385.57
5	80	Steady	Oman	1306.67
6	81	Steady	Bahrain	1305.52
7	134	Steady	Kuwait	1108.72
8	158	Steady	Yemen	1018.27
*Local rankings based on FIFA ranking points

=== Women's national teams ===
Rankings are calculated by FIFA.

FIFA Women's Rankings (as of 13 December 2024)
GFF*	FIFA	+/-	National Team	Points
1	93	▲1	Bahrain	1216.48
2	116	▼1	United Arab Emirates	1158.26
3	166	▲8	Saudi Arabia	877.08
4	173	▼1	Iraq	862.80
Unranked			Kuwait	870.00
Unranked			Qatar	864.00
*Local rankings based on FIFA ranking points

=== Team of the Year ===
==== Men ====
FIFA Men's World Ranking

Teams ranking in the top four – Men's
Year	First	Second	Third	Fourth
2024	Qatar	Iraq	Saudi Arabia	United Arab Emirates
2023	Saudi Arabia	Qatar	Iraq	United Arab Emirates
2022	Saudi Arabia	Qatar	Iraq	United Arab Emirates
2021	Qatar	Saudi Arabia	United Arab Emirates	Iraq
2020	Qatar	Saudi Arabia	Iraq	United Arab Emirates
2019	Qatar	Saudi Arabia	Iraq	United Arab Emirates
2018	Saudi Arabia	United Arab Emirates	Oman	Iraq
2017	Saudi Arabia	United Arab Emirates	Iraq	Oman
2016	Saudi Arabia	United Arab Emirates	Qatar	Iraq

==== Women ====
FIFA Women's World Ranking

Teams ranking in the top four – Women's
Year	First	Second	Third	Fourth
2024	Bahrain	United Arab Emirates	Saudi Arabia	Iraq
2023	Bahrain	United Arab Emirates	Saudi Arabia	—N/a
2022	Bahrain	United Arab Emirates	—N/a	—N/a
2021	Bahrain	United Arab Emirates	—N/a	—N/a
2020	United Arab Emirates	—N/a	—N/a	—N/a
2019	Bahrain	United Arab Emirates	—N/a	—N/a
2018	United Arab Emirates	—N/a	—N/a	—N/a
2017	Bahrain	United Arab Emirates	Iraq	—N/a
2016	Bahrain	United Arab Emirates	—N/a	—N/a

== See also ==
- West Asian Football Federation (WAFF)
- FIFA Arab Cup
