= Bay breeze (disambiguation) =

Bay breeze or Bay Breeze may refer to:

- Sea breeze, wind that develops over land near coasts
- Bay breeze (cocktail), a type of cocktail similar to the sea breeze (cocktail)
- Bay Area Breeze, Hayward, California, women's soccer team

== See also ==
- Bay (disambiguation)
- Breeze (disambiguation)
- Gulf breeze (disambiguation)
