= Texas State Highway 125 =

State highway in Texas

State Highway 125
- SH 125 highlighted in red

Route information
- Maintained by TxDOT
- Length: 27.747 mi (44.654 km) The official length does not include portions concurrent with SH 214 and FM 1780
- Existed: 1990–present

Major junctions
- West end: NM 125 at the New Mexico state line near Bledsoe
- SH 214 at Lehman
- East end: SH 114 / FM 1780 at Whiteface

Location
- Country: United States
- State: Texas
- Counties: Cochran

Highway system
- Highways in Texas; Interstate; US; State; Former; Toll; Loops; Spurs; FM/RM; Park; Rec
← SH 124	→ SH 126

State Highway 125 (SH 125) is a state highway in the U.S. state of Texas maintained by the Texas Department of Transportation (TxDOT). The 28-mile (45 km) highway begins at the New Mexico state line southwest of Bledsoe, and passes through Bledsoe where it turns east intersecting SH 214 before terminating at SH 114. The highway is located entirely within Cochran County, and is numerically continuous with New Mexico State Road 125 which it meets at the state line and connects the highway to Tatum, NM. The highway has brief concurrencies with SH 214 in Lehman and Farm to Market Road 1780 in Whiteface.

The highway's numerical designation was previously assigned to a roadway in southeast Texas during the 1920s and 1930s. The current highway was designated in 1990 over a portion of FM 769, but FM 769 had been unofficially signed as SH 125 since the 1950s. The connection New Mexico Highway was NM 294.

== Route description ==
SH 125 begins where it meets NM 125 at the New Mexico state line. The route proceeds to the northeast almost immediately intersecting from the south FM 769 which runs closely parallel to the state line on the Texas side. SH 125 continues to the northeast to Bledsoe where the route intersects FM 2182 before turning east along Third Street. The route intersects FM 595 before leaving Bledsoe and then intersects FM 1169 and FM 1779 between Bledsoe and Lehman.

In Lehman, the route joins SH 214 to the south for a short distance before turning east again. Beyond Lehman, the road intersects FM 2195 before gradually turning to the southeast toward Whiteface. The route enters Whiteface along East Second Street and turns north along North Taylor Street where SH 125 joins FM 1780. On the northern edge of Whiteface, SH 125 ends at SH 114.

SH 125 passes through mostly agricultural lands and oil and gas fields across the largely flat and featureless terrain of the Llano Estacado.

== History ==
SH 125 was previously designated on September 7, 1927 on a route from Anahuac to Beaumont in Chambers and Jefferson counties. On December 16, 1929, another split was added from Stowell through High Island to Galveston. On March 19, 1930, the route from Stowell to Galveston was renumbered as SH 124, and SH 125 had only the original section left. The former route designation was replaced on September 26, 1939 by SH 73-T between Anahuac and Stowell and by SH 124 between Stowell and Beaumont. SH 73-T was replaced by SH 65 on November 30, 1961.

The current route was originally designated as FM 769 between SH 214 in Lehman and SH 290, now SH 114 in Whiteface on November 18, 1947. That route was extended to the New Mexico state line on April 1, 1948, while also being extended 10 miles (16 km) southward from Whiteface to an intersection with a road that on July 14, 1949 would become FM 301 On December 17, 1952, FM 769 was extended southward 9.7 miles (15.6 km) along the New Mexico state line.

The route was first unofficially signed as SH 125 while officially maintaining its Farm to Market designation on March 30, 1955 allowing the route to be numerically continuous with its New Mexico counterpart, which was renumbered from NM 294 to NM 125 that day. On November 2, 1955, the portion of the route from FM 301 to SH 116 as the current SH 114 was designated between 1955 and 1978 was designated as an extension to FM 1780 with FM 769 ending where it intersected FM 1780. On May 2, 1962, the designation of FM 2010 was canceled and combined with FM 769 extending the route 11.5 miles (18.5 km) south along the state line to FM 1077 in Yoakum County. FM 1077 was renumbered as part of US 82 on December 16, 1963. FM 1077 has since been reassigned as RM 1077 to a route in Bandera County. FM 769 was extended 8.5 miles (13.7 km) farther south along the state line to US 83 west of Denver City on January 26, 1969.

The state highway designation became official on August 29, 1990, and the FM 769 designation was eliminated. On May 7, 1991, SH 125 was reassigned along its current alignment from the state line to SH 114 in Whiteface, and FM 769 was recreated along the state line from SH 83 to SH 125.

== Major intersections ==
The entire route is in Cochran County.

Location	mi	km	Destinations	Notes
	0.00	0.00	NM 125 west / FM 769 south – Bronco, Tatum	Continuation into New Mexico
Bledsoe	3.8	6.1	FM 2182 west	
Bledsoe	3.9	6.3	FM 595 north (Adams Street)	
	10.3	16.6	FM 1169 east	
	15.5	24.9	FM 1779 north	
	16.8	27.0	SH 214 north – Morton	West end of SH 214 overlap
	16.9	27.2	SH 214 south – Plains	East end of SH 214 overlap
	21.2	34.1	FM 2195 north	
Whiteface	27.7	44.6	FM 1780 (Taylor Street) to SH 114 – Levelland, Seagraves	
1.000 mi = 1.609 km; 1.000 km = 0.621 mi: Concurrency terminus
