= Transportation in Houston =

This is a documentation of the routes, highways, parking requirements, or anything related to transportation in Houston.

== Roads and highways ==
Houston has a hub-and-spoke freeway structure with multiple loops. The innermost is Interstate 610, forming approximately a 10-mile-diameter (16 km) loop around downtown. The roughly square "Loop-610" is quartered into "North Loop," "South Loop," "West Loop," and "East Loop." The roads of Beltway 8 and their freeway core, the Sam Houston Tollway, are the next loop, at a diameter of roughly 25 miles. A proposed highway project, State Highway 99 (The Grand Parkway), would form a third loop outside Houston, though some sections of this project have been controversial. As of June 2016, two portions of State Highway 99 have been completed: a 14.5-mile segment completed in April 2008 that runs from Interstate 10 in Mont Belvieu to Business State Highway 146 in Baytown, east of Houston; and a 71-mile segment completed between August 1994 and March 2016 that runs from Interstate 69/U.S. Highway 59 in Sugar Land, southwest of Houston, to Interstate 69/U.S. Highway 59 in New Caney, northeast of Houston. The next portions to be constructed are from the current terminus at Interstate 69/U.S. Highway 59 in Sugar Land to State Highway 288 in Brazoria County, and from the current terminus at Interstate 69/U.S. Highway 59 in New Caney to the current terminus at Interstate 10 in Mont Belvieu.

Houston also lies along the route of the proposed Interstate 69 North American Free Trade Agreement (NAFTA) superhighway that will link Canada, the U.S. industrial mid-west, Texas, and Mexico.

== Mass transit ==
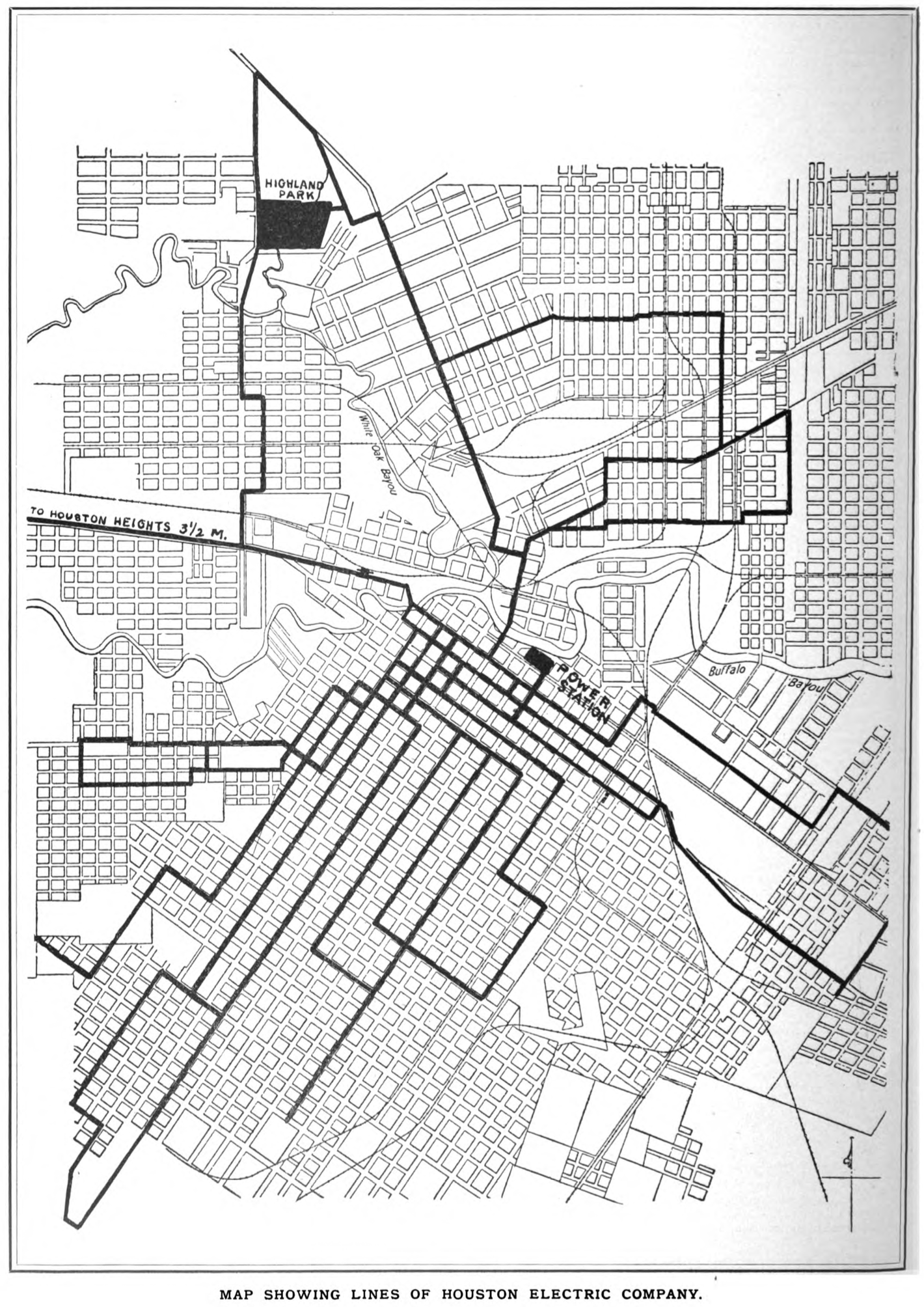
Map Showing Lines of the Houston Electric Company c 1907

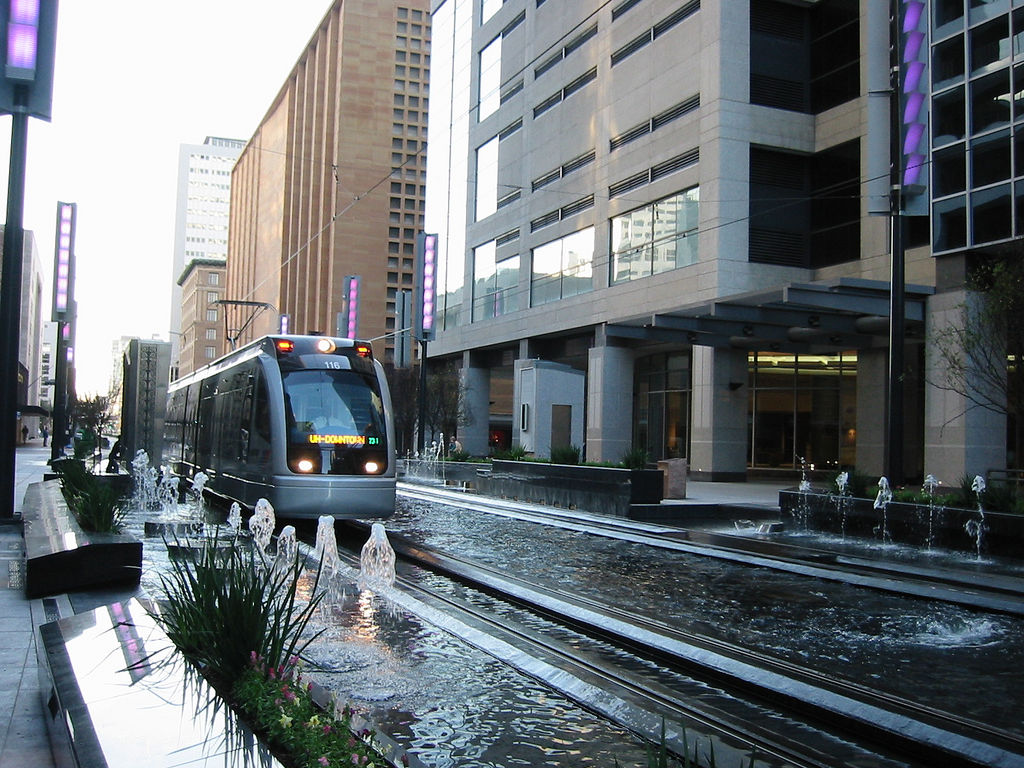
METRORail along the Main Street Corridor in Downtown

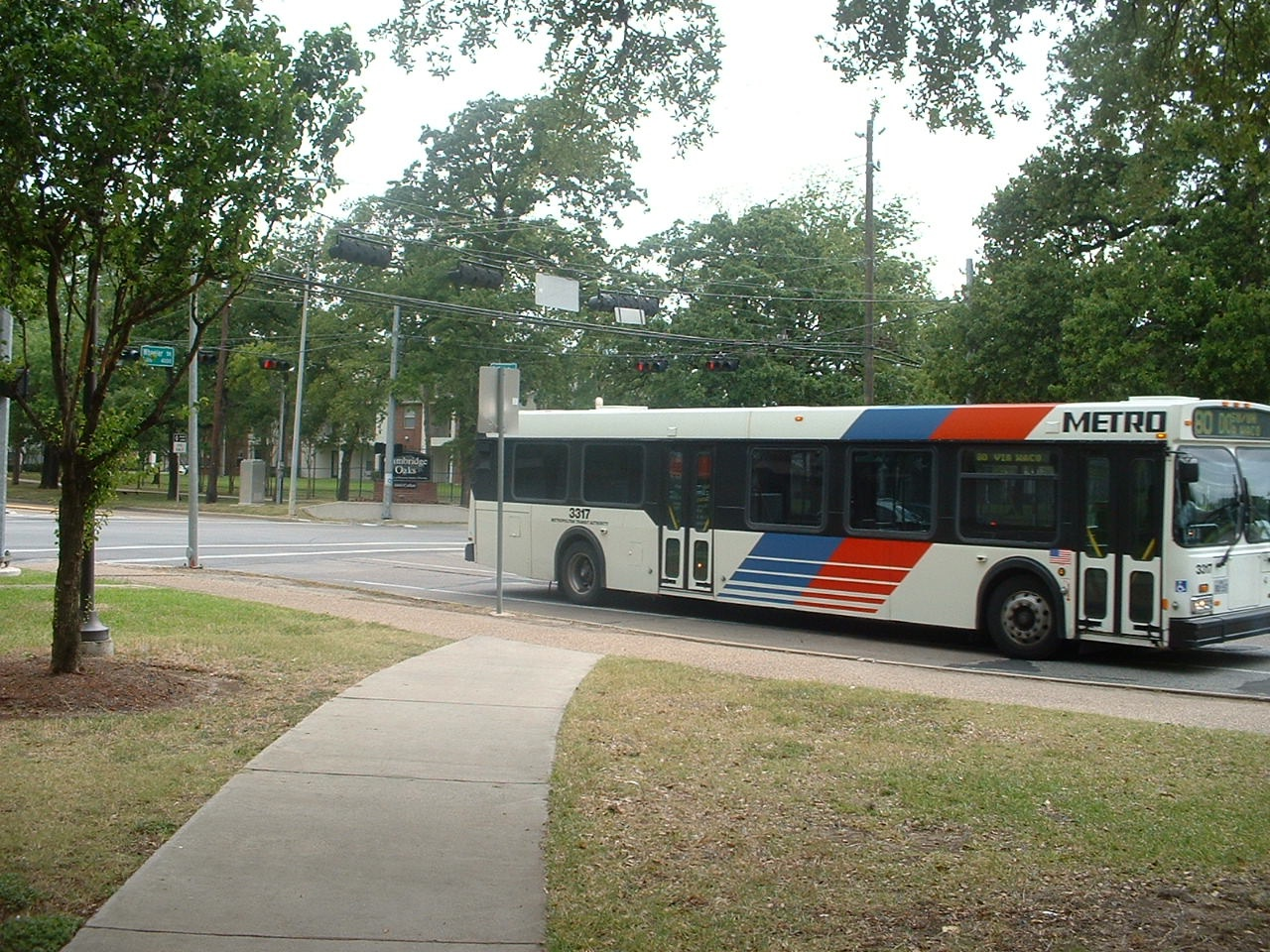
A METRO bus driving through the University of Houston campus on Cullen Boulevard.

The Metropolitan Transit Authority of Harris County, Texas, or METRO, provides public transportation in the form of buses, trolleys, and lift vans.

METRO began running light rail service (METRORail) on January 1, 2004. Currently the track runs approximately 13 miles (20.8 km) from Downtown Houston to the Texas Medical Center and Reliant Park Southbound and to the Northline Mall Northbound. METRO operates an extensive park-and-ride bus system to serve many of Houston's outlying suburban areas. Most of the park-and-ride buses run in barrier-separated high-occupancy-vehicle (HOV) lanes that provide direct service from park-and-ride parking lots to major employment destinations. Prior to the opening of METRORail, Houston was the largest city in the United States without a rail transit system.

Following a successful referendum held locally in 2003, METRO is currently in the beginning design phases of a 10-year expansion plan to add five more sections to connect to the current rail system. An 8.3 mile (13.4 km) expansion has been approved to run the service from the Uptown through Texas Southern University, ending at the University of Houston campus.

In addition, Harris County Transit operates some services in the portion of Clear Lake City in Houston. The Woodlands Express operates buses to Downtown and the Texas Medical Center from various park and ride locations..

== Airports ==
=== Airports within the city limits ===
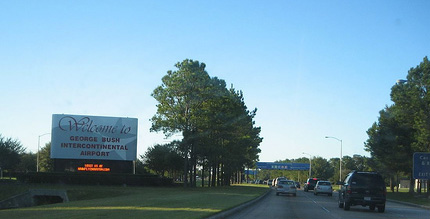
George Bush Intercontinental Airport

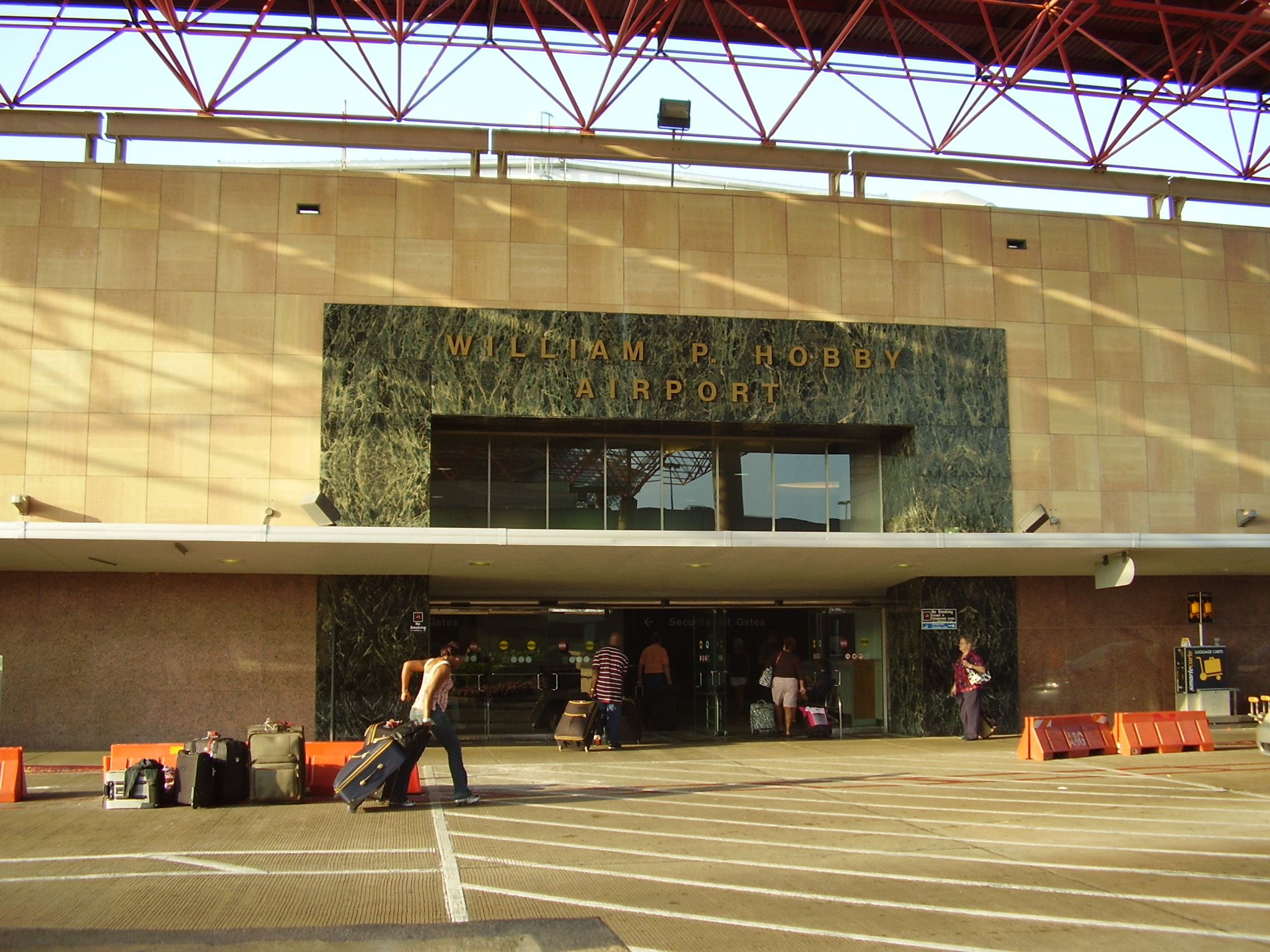
Hobby Airport

Houston is served by two commercial airports—the largest of which is the George Bush Intercontinental Airport (IAH). The airport is the 11th-busiest in the United States for total passengers, and 16th busiest worldwide. Bush Intercontinental is United Airlines second largest hub, with more than 650 daily departures (more than 450 of which are United flights).

Bush Intercontinental currently ranks second in the United States for non-stop domestic and international service (221 destinations), trailing only Atlanta Hartsfield with 250 destinations. In 2006, the United States Department of Transportation named Bush Intercontinental one of the top ten fastest growing airports in the United States.

The second-largest commercial airport in Houston is the William P. Hobby Airport (named Houston International Airport until 1967). The airport operates primarily small to medium-haul flights and is the only airport in Houston served by Southwest Airlines.

The third-largest airport and former U.S. Air Force base, Ellington Airport (formerly Ellington Field), is primarily used for government and private aircraft. At one point, Continental Express operated flights across the city to Bush Intercontinental primarily for residents of southeast Houston and Galveston County. Passenger flights ended on September 7, 2004.

The Federal Aviation Administration and the state of Texas selected the Houston Airport System, which manages Bush, Hobby, and Ellington, as Airport of the Year for 2005, largely because of its multi-year, $3.1 billion airport improvement program for both major airports in Houston.

Andrau Airpark, a privately owned airport, was located in Houston until 1998; it was demolished and as of 2008 contains the Royal Oaks Country Club subdivision.

=== Airports for fixed-wing aircraft outside the city limits ===
==== Publicly owned airports outside the city limits ====
The following publicly owned airports are in the Houston area:

- Harris County:
  - La Porte Municipal Airport in La Porte
  - Baytown Airport in unincorporated east Harris County, north of Baytown
- Fort Bend County:
  - Sugar Land Regional Airport in Sugar Land
- Galveston County:
  - Scholes International Airport at Galveston, a general aviation and military airport, is located in Galveston
- Montgomery County:
  - Lone Star Executive Airport in Conroe
- Brazoria County:
  - Texas Gulf Coast Regional Airport between Lake Jackson and Angleton in an unincorporated area
- Liberty County:
  - Liberty Municipal Airport is in Liberty.
  - Cleveland Municipal Airport is in Cleveland.
- Chambers County:
  - Chambers County Airport in an unincorporated area, east of Anahuac
  - Chambers County-Winnie Stowell Airport in an unincorporated area, near Winnie and Stowell

==== Privately owned airports outside the city limits ====
The following privately owned airports for public use are in the Houston area:

- Harris County
  - West Houston Airport is a general aviation airport located in unincorporated western Harris County, west of the Houston city limits.
  - David Wayne Hooks Memorial Airport, a general aviation airport, is located outside the Tomball city limits in unincorporated northwest Harris County.
  - Weiser Air Park is in unincorporated northwest Harris County.
  - Sack-O-Grande Acroport (also known as Harbican Airport) is located in an unincorporated area in western Harris County
- Fort Bend County
  - Houston Southwest Airport in Arcola
  - Westheimer Air Park in an unincorporated area
  - Happy Landings Airport in an unincorporated area
- Brazoria County
  - Skyway Manor Airport in Pearland
  - Pearland Regional Airport (also known as Clover Field Airport) south of Pearland in an unincorporated area
  - Flyin' B Airport in an unincorporated area
- Chambers County
  - RWJ Airpark in Beach City
- Waller County
  - Houston Executive Airport is located in an unincorporated area
  - Skydive Houston Airport (Skylake Airport) is located in an unincorporated area

=== Air traffic control center ===
The Houston Air Route Traffic Control Center stands on the George Bush Intercontinental Airport grounds.

== Intercity rail ==
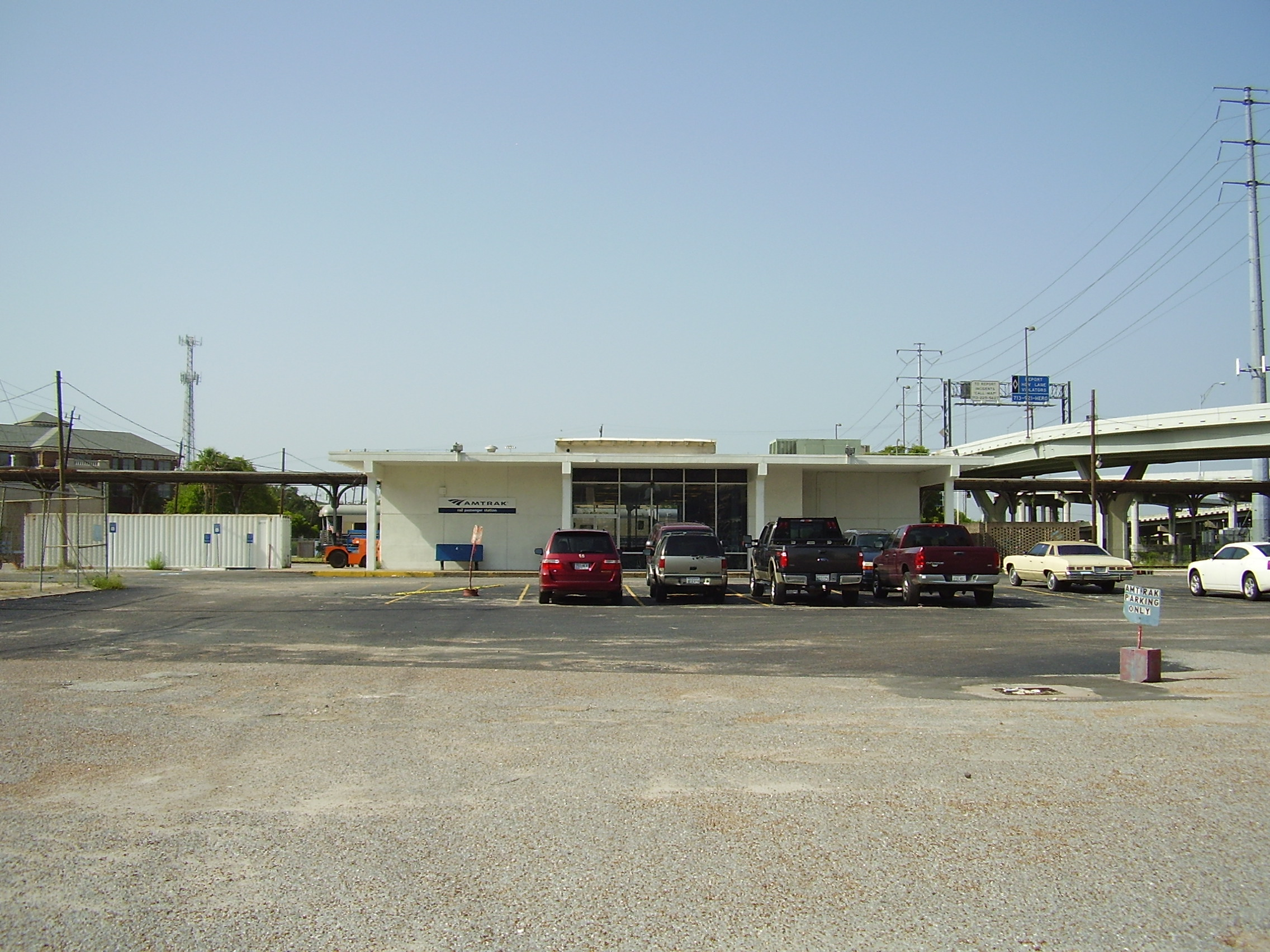
Amtrak Houston Station in 2005

Amtrak's thrice-weekly Los Angeles–New Orleans Sunset Limited stops at the Houston train station, which is on the north side of the downtown area. There were 20,205 boardings and alightings at the station in FY2018.

An Amtrak Thruway connects Houston with Amtrak's Chicago–San Antonio Texas Eagle at Longview. It departs Longview in the morning after the arrival of the southbound (Chicago to San Antonio) train and arrives in Longview in the evening to meet the northbound (San Antonio to Chicago) train.

The Texas Central Railway, a proposed Houston–Dallas high-speed rail line, is scheduled to start service in 2026.

== Intercity bus ==
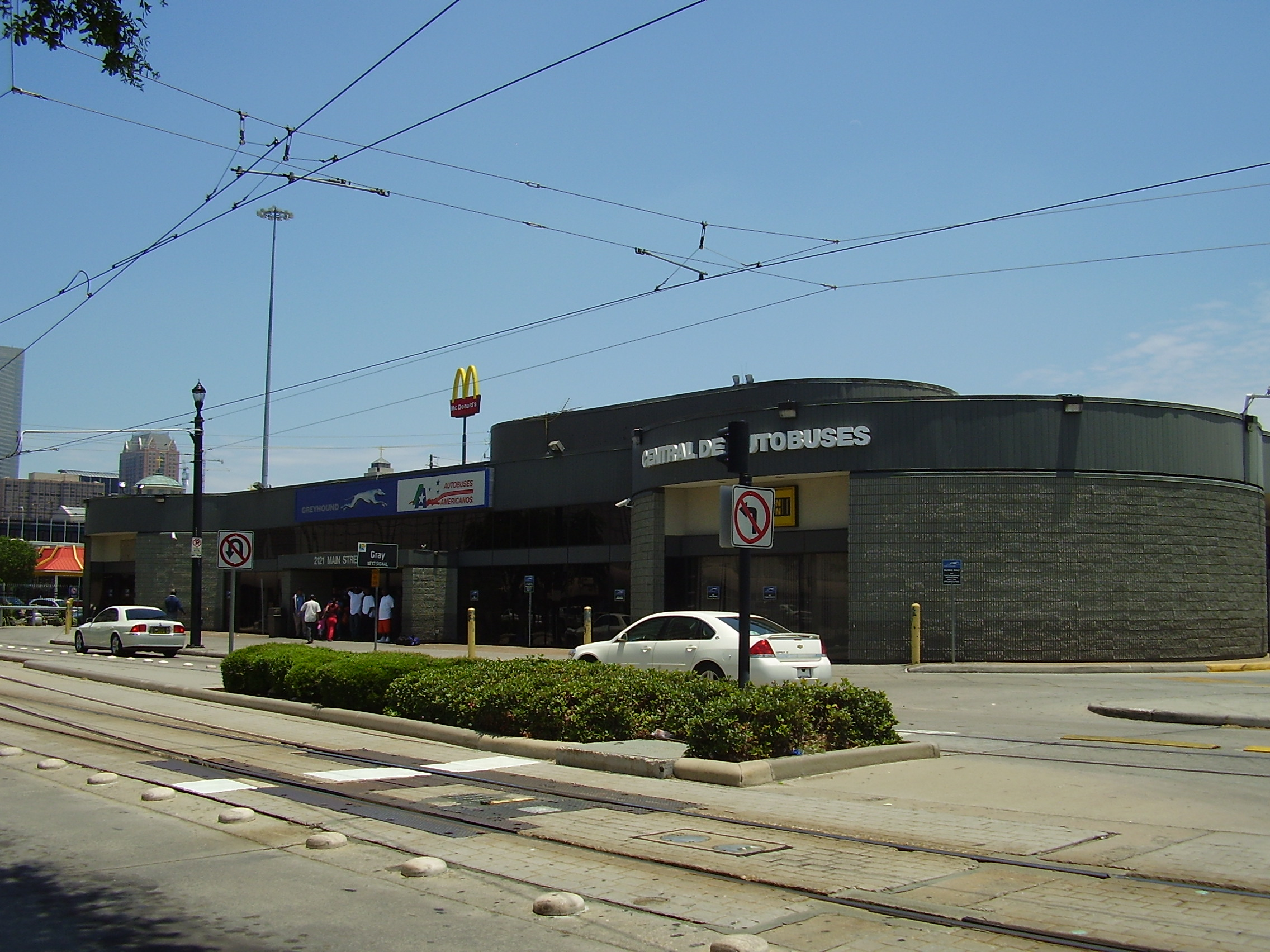
Greyhound Lines Houston Station in Midtown

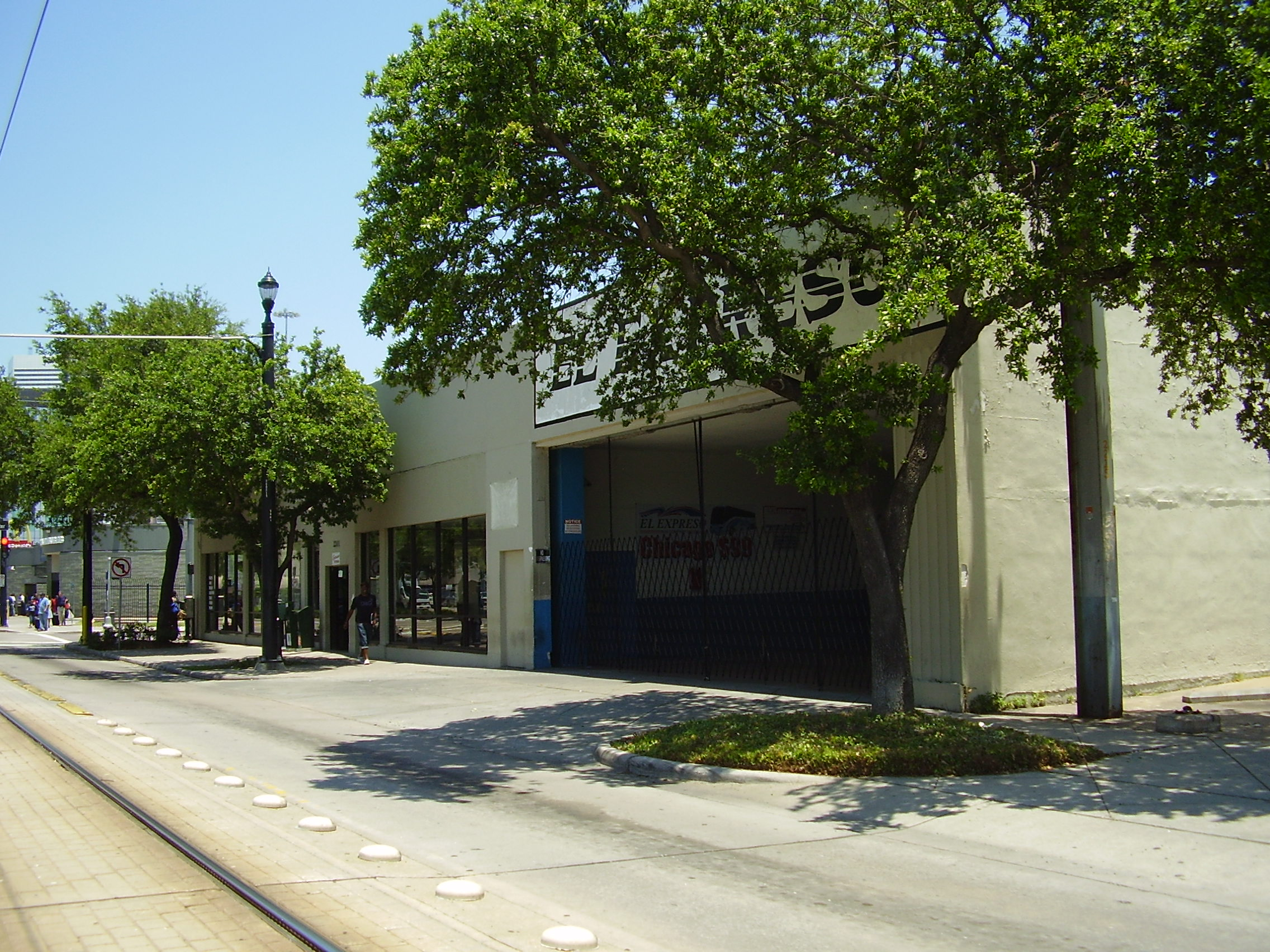
El Expreso Station in Midtown

Greyhound Lines operates services from five stations:

- Houston Greyhound Station at 2121 South Main Street
- Coach USA Inc. Dept. Casin (Houston Crosstimbers) at 4001 North Freeway
- The Box Store (Houston Northwest) at 1500 West Loop North Suite 117
- Americanos U.S. L.L.C. (Houston Southeast) at 7000 Harrisburg Street
- Agencia Autobuses (Houston Southwest) at 6590 Southwest Freeway

In addition, Greyhound operates services from two stops:

- Houston Aau
- Houston (Amtrak station)

Greyhound also provides seamless connecting service to major cities in Mexico via Autobuses Americanos at the main bus station in midtown.

Greyhound also operates services to stops within the Greater Houston area, including:

- Alvin (Yellow Jacket Grocery-Citgo)
- Angleton (Ocampos Mexican Rest)
- Baytown (Baytown Travel Express)
- Conroe (Conroe Greyhound Station)
- Galveston (Galveston Bus Station)
- Katy (at Millers Exxon)
- Prairie View (at Unco Food Store)
- Rosenberg (at Shell-McDonald's)
- Sealy (at Mazac Muffler City-AC)
- Texas City (at McKown Air Conditioning, also serving La Marque)

Kerrville Bus Company operates from the Houston Greyhound Station in conjunction with Greyhound.

Megabus operates low-cost double-decker coaches from Houston to major cities in Texas and Louisiana.

Shofur operates service from Houston to major cities in Texas.

El Expreso Bus Company operates services to a station in Houston adjacent to the Greyhound Station.

Tornado Bus Company operates services to two stations in Houston , with one along Airline Drive and one along Lockwood.

Turimex Internacional operates service to a station in Houston.

Omnibus Express operates service to a station in Houston.

In the 1990s various bus companies began operations in the East End, serving Mexico and other parts of the United States from East End terminals.

=== Intercity bus to airport ===
VivaAerobus, a Mexican airline, operated a bus shuttle between Austin-Bergstrom International Airport South Terminal and the Omnibus Mexicanos Bus Terminal in eastern Houston for VivaAerobus passengers on flights going to and from Cancun and Monterrey. On May 16, 2009, VivaAerobus stated it would cease passenger operations at Austin-Bergstrom International Airport on May 31, 2009. The airline blamed the pullout in part on the outbreak of the swine flu, which caused an unprecedented decrease in demand for service.

== Seaport ==
The Port of Houston is one of the most important ports in the United States, and it is currently second in volume of cargo, right after the Port of South Louisiana. It is also first in the United States in foreign cargo volume. In 2013, more than 229 million total volumes of cargo was handled through the port.

The Port of Galveston is a major hub for cruises and passenger ships. In 2013, 901 thousand passengers were transported through the port, making it the second busiest port in the contiguous United States outside the South Florida metropolitan area.

== Pedestrian travel ==
Texas Department of Transportation statistics said that in an eight county area including Houston, between 2003 and 2008, around 100 pedestrians died and 1,175 were injured in crashes every year. Mark Seegers, a spokesperson for Harris County commissioner Sylvia Garcia, said in 2009 that "The county does not do sidewalks; it’s not what gets cars [the predominant form of transportation in the Houston area] from point A to point B." Robin Holzer, a transportation advocate with the Citizens' Transportation Coalition, criticized the emphasis on automobiles, saying "The people on foot and bike are trying to go to the same schools and restaurants and shops as people in cars are going to."

In 2005 the Houston-Galveston Area Council identified several communities in Harris County considered to be among the most hazardous to pedestrians. Many of them, including Greenspoint and Gulfton, are located outside the 610 Loop. In 2009 the lobby group Transportation for America said that the Houston area was the eighth most dangerous area for pedestrians in 2007-2008.

In 2013, Mayor Annise Parker announced the "Houston Complete Street and Transportation Plan", which was an executive order calling for enhanced pedestrian and bicycling modes of transportation when planning new or reconstructing streets. Combined with the "ReBuild Houston" initiative approved by Houston voters in 2010, many new streets have been redesigned using the complete street guidelines.

Houston currently has over 300 miles of City-constructed bike lanes, bike routes, shared lanes, bayou trails and rails-to-trails across a 500 square mile area of Houston.

== Demographics by mode of travel ==
Dan Felstein and Claudia Kolker of the Houston Chronicle said in 1997 that most Houstonians who take public transportation are poor. A 1995 survey concluded that 76% of people riding on local bus lines of the Metropolitan Transit Authority of Harris County (METRO) took the buses because they had no other means of transportation. A 1993 survey concluded that of the people who had stopped riding local bus routes of METRO, 46% had acquired or repaired automobiles. 37% of the respondents said that METRO could not possibly do anything to convince them to ride the buses again.

As of U.S. Census figures current as of 1997, 9% of residents in Harris County did not own automobiles. This figure does not include people who own cars, but do not have enough money to repair the automobiles. As of that year, while the average income of all residents of the county was $41,000, the average income of households without cars was $13,000.

In Harris County, the average one way commute for a person using an automobile was 25 minutes, while the average commute for a person not using an automobile was 44 minutes, a 76% longer duration than the figure for commuters with cars.

As of 1997 many of the lower socio-economic groups, such as the homeless or new-immigrants, rely on bicycles, family members, and neighbors for transportation. Dan Feldstein and Claudia Kolker of the Houston Chronicle said that "ironically, some of the poorest Houstonians have wider transportation options than their middle-class counterparts."

== Parking requirements ==
An ordinance passed by Houston’s City Council will allow new areas of the city to be exempt from existing parking requirements. The Walkable Places Subcommittee proposed the idea in early 2018 of expanding the “market-based parking” (MBP) that already exists in Houston’s central business district to surrounding areas. This proposal aimed to reduce “excessive parking” produced by parking requirements and to take a step toward a less car-centric city. Many local businesses expressed support for the proposed ordinance, and both the Midtown and East Downtown Management Districts wrote letters in support of the measure.

After a long period of engagement and feedback on the part of community members and the Planning Commission, the City Council voted on July 17, 2019, to amend Chapter 26 of the code of ordinances, expanding Houston’s market-based parking area to include East Downtown and part of Midtown. All City Council members, except District G Council Member Greg Travis, supported the ordinance.

The new MBP area will afford developers more freedom in how they use their land by allowing them to provide parking based on projected market demand, rather than according to a set parking requirement. Proponents of the ordinance claim that parking minimums create too much parking and lead to inefficient use of city space, particularly in Houston which invests a lot in their public transit. Moreover, they argue that allowing market-based parking will make the city more friendly to pedestrians, cyclists, and public transit by reducing the number of cars on the road.

Council Member Greg Travis expressed fear that the measure would produce “unintended consequences". He contended that the market-based parking approach would not be viable in a city that isn’t “high density like New York". Travis said that people want the convenience of being able to park close to their destination and worried that if this convenience is taken away businesses will lose customers.

While many residents of East Downtown and Midtown expressed support for the ordinance’s passage, some argued that getting rid of parking requirements would create a shortage of parking near businesses and force the overflow of cars to park in nearby neighborhoods. Conversely, some advocates of reduced parking requirements were disappointed that the ordinance only expanded the MBP area to what they felt was too small an area and voiced their hope for more exemption areas in the future.

== See also ==
- Plug-in electric vehicles in Texas § Houston
