= East Bay (Texas) =

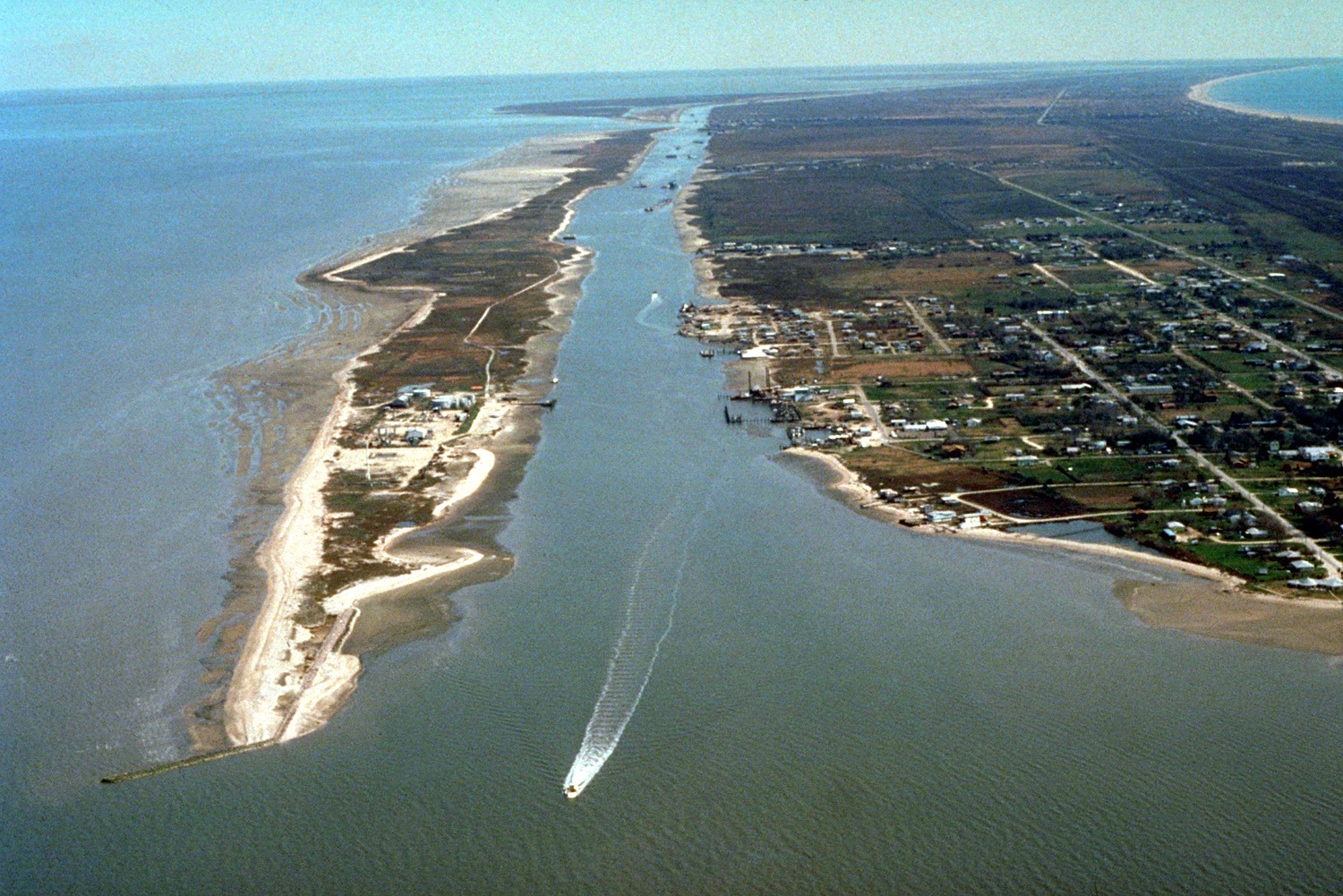
- East Bay (left), off the shore of Bolivar Peninsula cut by the Intracoastal Waterway (center)

- Location within Texas Location within the United States
- Location: Texas Gulf Coast
- Coordinates: 29.508641°N 94.671764°W
- River sources: Oyster Bayou, East Bay Bayou
- Ocean/sea sources: Gulf of Mexico
- Basin countries: United States
- Settlements: Gilchrist, Smith Point, Port Bolivar

East Bay also known as East Galveston Bay, is the eastern extension of Galveston Bay found in Chambers County, Texas. The bay is oriented northeast to southwest, and is approximately five miles wide and twenty miles in length. It covers the area north of the entire Bolivar Peninsula, and south of mainland Texas, including the small community of Smith Point at the western extreme. The bay's one extension is Rollover Bay, which is found to the extreme east near the town of Gilchrist.

== History ==
The Spanish controlled the bay during the course of their conquest of Texas. During their rule, sea captains would customarily land at Bolivar Peninsula and roll imported or exported goods across a small patch of land to or from the aptly named Rollover Bay to avoid the Galveston trade customs. Centuries later, a natural channel in the area was dredged to create Rollover Pass, named for the practice that previously occurred. The pass cut Gilchrist in half and improved flows from the Gulf of Mexico to East Bay. As a result, Gilchrist benefited economically from the pass, which became one of the most productive fishing locations along the Texas coast, and East Bay was supplied with a greater amount of seawater to improve the bay's fish and vegetative habitat.

The Spanish notably landed on the northern shore of the bay at present-day Smith Point in 1805 to defend their Atascosito settlement. Following the establishment of Mexico about twenty years later, the site of the landing was named for John Smith who protested the Mexican government's claims in the area. Soon thereafter, a small community was established. The residents depended on East Bay to provide sustenance and transportation before the introduction of the automobile. A few ranches were also established on the bay. Fishing and ranching were the mainstay of the economy until oil was discovered in 1944. Since then, numerous oil and gas wells have been constructed both onshore and in East Bay. According to the U.S Census, Smith Point had a population of 150 people in 2000.

== Features ==
East Bay exchanges seawater with the Gulf of Mexico at Rollover Pass in Gilchrist and at Galveston Harbor near Port Bolivar. It is fed by Oyster Bayou, an important nursery for oysters and shrimp, which runs 23 miles from its source near Winnie through the Jocelyn Nungaray National Wildlife Refuge (formerly the Anahuac NWR) to its confluence with East Bay, near the bay's easternmost point. At the easternmost point, the combined waters of East Bay Bayou and the Intracoastal Waterway merge with the bay.

== Conservation Efforts ==
The Galveston Bay Foundation has provided comprehensive ecological restoration and protection to the area. The foundation has restored thousands of acres of wetlands, providing a nursery habitat for recreational and commercial fish species. These important wetland ecosystem provide necessary buffers to storm surges and reduce shoreline erosion. The foundation has worked with community members to return 1,000+ tons of oyster shells into the bay, allowing more oysters to filter harmful biochemical heavy metals polluting East Bay. To date, Galveston Bay Foundation has protected over 20 miles of shoreline and restored nearly 50 acres of salt marsh through living shorelines, protecting shorelines from erosion. Such protection from erosion have shown to be critical to wetland/marshland ecosystems. Storm surge models from major hurricanes (i.e. Hurricane Ike) have revealed the erosion potential of major hurricanes.

== See above ==
- West Bay (Texas)
