= Texas State Highway 61 =

State highway in Texas

State Highway 61

Route information
- Maintained by TxDOT
- Length: 21.426 mi (34.482 km)
- Existed: 1923–present

Major junctions
- South end: Washington Ave. in Anahuac
- SH 65 in Four Corners; I-10 near Hankamer
- North end: US 90 in Devers

Location
- Country: United States
- State: Texas
- Counties: Chambers, Liberty

Highway system
- Highways in Texas; Interstate; US; State; Former; Toll; Loops; Spurs; FM/RM; Park; Rec
← SH 60	→ US 62

State Highway 61 (SH 61) is a 21.426-mile (34.482 km) state highway in southeast Texas. It connects Anahuac in Chambers County to Devers in Liberty County.

== Route description ==
The southern terminus of SH 61 is in Anahuac, along Washington Avenue; state maintenance begins just south of Stowell Street. The route travels north into Anahuac before turning to the east. It passes the Chambers County Airport before an intersection with SH 65; SH 61 turns to the north, while SH 65 continues east. SH 61 crosses I-10 near the community of Turtle Bayou, northeast of Lake Anahuac. The route travels north into Liberty County before reaching its northern terminus in Devers at US 90.

== History ==
SH 61 was designated on August 21, 1923, from Devers to Anahuac replacing part of SH 35A (the rest was cancelled). Its official designation has remained unchanged since the 1939 redescription of the Texas highway system.

== Major intersections ==
County	Location	mi	km	Destinations	Notes
Chambers	Anahuac	0.0	0.0	Washington Avenue	Southern terminus; state maintenance ends
Chambers	Anahuac	1.1	1.8	FM 563 – Turtle Bayou	
Chambers	Four Corners	3.1	5.0	SH 65 / FM 562 – Stowell, Double Bayou	
Chambers		5.2	8.4	FM 2041	
Chambers		6.9	11.1	I-10 – Houston, Beaumont	I-10 exit 813
Chambers	Hankamer	9.1	14.6	FM 1663 – Winnie	
Liberty		15.5	24.9	FM 1410	
Liberty	Devers	21.4	34.4	US 90 – Liberty, Beaumont	Northern terminus
1.000 mi = 1.609 km; 1.000 km = 0.621 mi
