= Texas State Highway 73 =

State highway in Texas

State Highway 73
- SH 73 highlighted in red

Route information
- Maintained by TxDOT
- Length: 42.02 mi (Note: The certified mileage given is shorter than the actual mileage as TxDOT considers SH 73 to be discontinuous at rather than concurrent with SH 62.) (67.62 km)
- Existed: 1923–present

Major junctions
- West end: I-10 in Winnie
- US 69 / US 96 / US 287 in Port Arthur
- East end: I-10 near Orange

Location
- Country: United States
- State: Texas
- Counties: Chambers, Jefferson, Orange

Highway system
- Highways in Texas; Interstate; US; State; Former; Toll; Loops; Spurs; FM/RM; Park; Rec
← SH 72	→ SH 74

State Highway 73 (SH 73) is a Texas state highway that runs 42 miles (68 km) from Winnie through Port Arthur to near Orange.

In September 2008, Hurricane Ike forced the closure of SH 73. Among other road debris left by the storm were two 200-ton barges. The storm surge pushed the barges inland before they came to rest on the highway.

== History ==
The original SH 73 was designated on August 21, 1923, from Oldenburg to Houston, absorbing the eastern half of SH 3A. On October 26, 1932, it was rerouted southwest from Katy to Alleyton, with the portion from Oldenburg to Industry being another section (FM 109 would connect the two sections later). On November 30, 1932, the section from Katy to Sealy was taken over for maintenance, and plans to construct the section from Sealy to Alleyton were underway. On December 8, 1932, the section from Industry to Oldenburg was transferred to SH 159. On July 15, 1935, the section from Sealy to Alleyton was cancelled (as it was not built yet). This section was restored on May 19, 1936. On September 26, 1939, SH 73 was extended east to Port Arthur, replacing SH 228, and the stretch from Winnie to Anahuac replaced part of SH 125. On November 24, 1941, the section from Columbus to Houston was canceled and transferred to rerouted US 90. Construction was slow, with only small portions outside Houston, Port Arthur, and the stretch from Winnie to Anahuac (signed as 73-T) completed by 1954. On November 30, 1961, the route was shortened from Port Arthur to Winnie, with the western portions having been replaced by Interstate 10 (I-10). SH 73-T was renumbered as SH 65. On July 29, 1982, the route was extended along its current route to Orange, along a concurrent route with SH 87 and SH 62.

SH 73A was designated on July 18, 1924, from SH 73 in Fayetteville to Hempstead as a restoration of canceled SH 3C. On March 19, 1930, this route was renumbered SH 159.

Beginning in 2021, TxDOT started construction on the interchange with US 69. The project will replace the old cloverleaf interchange with a new turbine interchange, while also widening the lanes on both SH 73 and US 69. Construction is expected to last until late 2027.

== In popular culture ==
SH 73 in Texas is shown as a road sign in the opening 10 seconds of the 1941 movie Moon Over Miami immediately following the opening credits. There is no mention of the city in that film. A similar road sign of SH 73 is also depicted on the set of The Partridge Family.

== Major intersections ==
County	Location	mi	km	Destinations	Notes
Chambers		0.0	0.0	I-10 west / FM 1406 – Houston	Westbound exit and eastbound entrance; I-10 exit 828
Chambers		0.4	0.64	SH 124 south / FM 1663 – Winnie, Galveston	West end of SH 124 concurrency; FM 1663 was former Spur 5
Chambers				Broussard Road	Former eastbound exit only
Chambers		1.8	2.9	FM 1406 – Winnie	Eastbound exit only
Jefferson		2.1	3.4	SH 124 north – Hamshire, Fannett	Interchange; east end of freeway; east end of SH 124 concurrency
Jefferson	Port Arthur	24.4	39.3	Spur 93 north	
Jefferson	Port Arthur	24.8	39.9	SH 82 south – Cameron	interchange; west end of freeway
Jefferson	Port Arthur	27.3	43.9	Spur 215 (Savannah Avenue)	
Jefferson	Port Arthur	28.4	45.7	US 69 / US 96 / US 287 (Memorial Boulevard) – Beaumont, Airport	
Jefferson	Port Arthur	29.1	46.8	9th Avenue	
Jefferson	Port Arthur	30.1	48.4	SH 347 – Nederland	
Jefferson	Groves	30.7	49.4	39th Street – Groves	no direct westbound exit (signed at 32nd Street)
Jefferson	Groves	31.2	50.2	32nd Street / Main Avenue	
Jefferson	Groves	31.8	51.2	25th Street – Groves	
Jefferson	Port Arthur	32.8	52.8	SH 87 south – Port Arthur	West end of SH 87 concurrency; no direct eastbound exit (signed at 25th Street)
Jefferson	Port Arthur	32.9	52.9	Taft Avenue / Procter Street	
Jefferson	Port Arthur	33.6	54.1	FM 366 – Groves, Port Neches	interchange; east end of freeway; no direct eastbound exit (signed at Taft Avenue / Procter Street)
Neches River		35.1– 37.0	56.5– 59.5	Veterans Memorial Bridge (eastbound) / Rainbow Bridge (westbound)	
Orange	Bridge City	40.4	65.0	FM 1442 north	
Orange		41.5– 41.7	66.8– 67.1	Cow Bayou Swing Bridge over Cow Bayou	
Orange		42.1	67.8	SH 87 north / SH 62 begins	East end of SH 87 concurrency; west end of SH 62 concurrency
Orange	Orange	44.2	71.1	FM 105 – Orangefield, Orange	
Orange	Orange	46.7	75.2	I-10 (US 90) / SH 62 north – Beaumont, Lake Charles	I-10 exit 873; east end of SH 62 overlap
1.000 mi = 1.609 km; 1.000 km = 0.621 mi: Closed/former; Concurrency terminus; Incomplete access
