= Moody National Wildlife Refuge =

National Wildlife Refuge in Texas

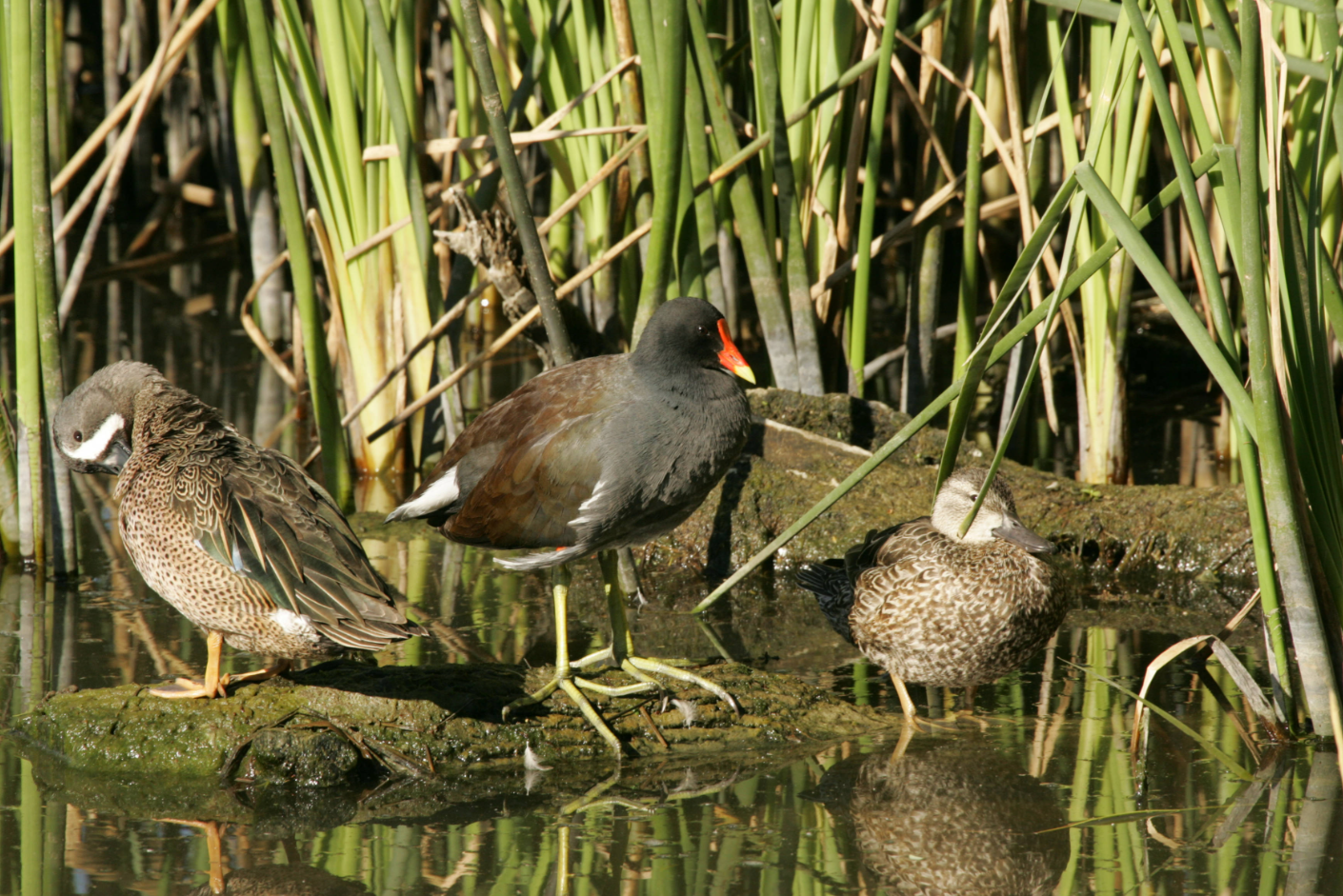
- A common moorhen (Gallinula chloropus), center, and a pair of blue-winged teal (Spatula discors) in the Moody National Wildlife Refuge.

- Location within the United States Location within Texas
- Location: Chambers County, Texas, United States
- Nearest city: Anahuac, Texas
- Coordinates: 29°32′45″N 094°41′10″W
- Area: 3,517 acres (1,423 ha)
- Established: 1961
- Visitors: 0 (closed to public)
- Governing body: United States Fish and Wildlife Service
- Website: Moody National Wildlife Refuge

The Moody National Wildlife Refuge is a National Wildlife Refuge of the United States in Chambers County, Texas.

== Geography ==
The Moody National Wildlife Refuge lies in a coastal wetlands area of Chambers County along the coast of the Gulf of Mexico in southeastern Texas. It covers an area of 3,516 acres (1,422.9 hectares) according to one source or 3,517 acres (1,423.3 hectares) according to others. It is located between Smith Point, Texas, and the Jocelyn Nungaray (formerly Anahuac) National Wildlife Refuge, and is southeast of Houston and northeast of Galveston.

== Flora and fauna ==
The Moody National Wildlife Refuge consists of coastal marshes. Its coastal wetland environment provides habitats for resident, migrating, and wintering birds. Migratory birds that visit the refuge include waterfowl, raptors, shorebirds, colonial waterbirds, and songbirds, including neotropical warblers. Large numbers of waterfowl winter in the refuge. The bald eagle(Haliaeetus leucocephalus), piping plover (Charadrius melodus), and peregrine falcon (Falco peregrinus) are among the threatened and endangered species found in the refuge. The refuge's habitats also shelter an abundance of other wildlife and fish species.

== History ==
The Moody National Wildlife Refuge was created in 1961. It was authorized under the terms of the Migratory Bird Treaty Act of 1918.

== Management ==
The USFWS administers the Moody National Wildlife Refuge as part of the Texas Chenier Plain Refuge Complex, which also includes the Jocelyn Nungaray (formerly Anahuac) National Wildlife Refuge, the McFaddin National Wildlife Refuge, and the Texas Point National Wildlife Refuge. It is the oldest of the four refuges. All of its land is privately owned, and it operates on the land under the terms of a conservation easement, according to which the landowners voluntarily agree not to develop the land and waters of the refuge and allow their protection and management by the USFWS.

== Activities ==
The USFWS works actively to restore and maintain habitats in the Moody National Wildlife Refuge and to counter threats to its habitats posed by land subsidence, erosion, the intrusion of salt water, and the spread of introduced plant species. The USFWS uses land conservation techniques in the refuge that include controlled burns, water management, introduced plant species control, and prairie restoration.

== Access ==
The Moody National Wildlife Refuge lies on privately owned land and is closed to the public.
