= Texas State Highway 124 =

State highway in Texas

State Highway 124
- SH 124, highlighted in red

Route information
- Maintained by TxDOT
- Length: 40.200 mi (64.696 km)
- Existed: 1929–present

Major junctions
- South end: SH 87 in High Island
- SH 65 in Stowell; SH 73 in Winnie
- North end: US 69 / US 96 / US 287 in Beaumont

Location
- Country: United States
- State: Texas
- Counties: Galveston, Chambers, Jefferson

Highway system
- Highways in Texas; Interstate; US; State; Former; Toll; Loops; Spurs; FM/RM; Park; Rec
← SH 123	→ SH 125

State Highway 124 (SH 124) is a state highway in the U.S. state of Texas maintained by the Texas Department of Transportation (TxDOT). The highway begins along the Gulf Coast near the northeast end of the Bolivar Peninsula at SH 87 and extends to the northeast ending at US 69 and US 96. In between, the highway has major intersections with SH 65 and SH 73. The highway is located in Galveston, Chambers, and Jefferson counties and also serves the communities of Hamshire, Fannett, and Cheek. A portion of SH 124 is part of a longer coastal hurricane evacuation route.

The route number was originally assigned over a portion of the current SH 16 between Fredericksburg and Comanche in Central Texas during the late 1920s. By the early 1930s, the route number was assigned along the current route south of Stowell to High Island and along the current SH 87 to Port Bolivar and eventually Galveston. By the end of the decade, the highway received its current High Island to Beaumont configuration.

== Route description ==
SH 124 begins at SH 87 in High Island along the Gulf Coast near the northeastern end of the Bolivar Peninsula in Galveston County. SH 87 from this point toward Sabine Pass has been closed since 1990 due to coastal erosion. The highway proceeds to the north climbing up a salt dome where the central portion of High Island is located. Leaving town, the highway travels back downhill entering marshland where the highway enters Chambers County upon bridging the Gulf Intracoastal Waterway.

The highway leaves the marshland and continues north with FM 1985 branching to the west and then FM 1941. Further north, the highway passes through Stowell where SH 65 branches off to the west. In Stowell and Winnie, the route is known as Gulfway Drive south of SH 73. The highway intersects FM 1406 in Winnie and then turns east along SH 73 meeting the terminus of FM 1406 on the town's eastern edge at the boundary with Jefferson County.

The highway shortly branches off of SH 73 to the northeast passing through Hamshire, intersecting FM 365 at Fannett, and then passing through Cheek. The highway continues to the northeast on a course closely paralleling Interstate 10 into Beaumont. FM 364 branches off to the north as the highway enters Beaumont where it as known as Fannett Road. The highway then terminates at US 69 / US 96 / US 287 in southern Beaumont.

The portion of SH 124 from its south end at SH 87 to FM 1406 in Winnie is part of a longer hurricane evacuation route extending northward to US 90.

== History ==

SH 124 was originally designated along a route from Fredericksburg to Comanche passing through Llano, San Saba, and Goldthwaite on September 9, 1927. On March 19, 1930, that previous route was reassigned as part of SH 81 and is now part of SH 16, while SH 124 was designated over a new route from Port Bolivar along the current SH 87 to High Island, and then over the current SH 124 to Stowell, replacing a split of SH 125 that was designated on December 16, 1929. The route terminated in Stowell at SH 125 which then was made up of the present SH 65 between Stowell and Anahuac and the current SH 124 to Beaumont. The state highway department assumed control of the ferry service between Port Bolivar and Galveston in 1930 and resumed operations in 1934 after making extensive renovations extending SH 124 to US 75 and SH 6 in Galveston.

On March 17, 1936, the portion of SH 124 from Galveston to High Island was renamed as an extension of SH 87. On September 26, 1939, SH 125 between Anahuac and Stowell was renamed as part of SH 73 and SH 124 was extended over the remainder of SH 125 including a concurrent portion of SH 73 between Stowell and Winnie to Beaumont terminating at US 90. SH 124 was shortened within Beaumont on August 25, 1953, to its present terminus at the US 69 and US 96 bypass. On November 30, 1961, SH 73 was designated as terminating at I-10 in Winnie, and SH 65 was designated over the former portion of SH 73 between Anahuac and Stowell.

== Major intersections ==
County	Location	mi	km	Destinations	Notes
Galveston	High Island	0.0	0.0	SH 87 south – Port Bolivar, Galveston	Southern terminus; SH 87 north to Sabine Pass closed
Chambers		9.2	14.8	FM 1985 west – Jocelyn Nungaray National Wildlife Refuge	
Chambers		11.9	19.2	FM 1941 west	
Chambers	Stowell	17.4	28.0	SH 65 west – Anahuac	
Chambers	Winnie	19.3	31.1	FM 1406 – Nome	Access to Riceland Medical Center
Chambers	Winnie	19.7	31.7	SH 73 west / FM 1663 north to I-10 – Houston, Beaumont	Interchange; south end of SH 73 overlap
Chambers	Winnie	21.3	34.3	FM 1406 – Winnie	Interchange; northbound exit only
Jefferson		21.5	34.6	SH 73 east – Port Arthur	Interchange; north end of SH 73 overlap
Jefferson	Fannett	31.0	49.9	FM 365 – Nome, Port Arthur	
Jefferson	Beaumont	37.6	60.5	FM 364 north (South Major Drive)	
Jefferson	Beaumont	41.9	67.4	US 69 / US 96 / US 287 (Cardinal Drive) to I-10 – Port Arthur	Interchange; northern terminus
1.000 mi = 1.609 km; 1.000 km = 0.621 mi: Concurrency terminus; Incomplete access
