= Hankamer, Texas =

- Unincorporated community
- Location within Texas Location within the United States
- Coordinates: 29°51′30″N 94°37′37″W
- Country: United States
- State: Texas
- County: Chambers
- Elevation: 33 ft (10 m)
- Time zone: UTC-6 (Central (CST))
  - Summer (DST): UTC-5 (CDT)
- Area code: 409
- GNIS feature ID: 1337306

Hankamer is an unincorporated populated place in northern Chambers County, Texas, United States. According to the Handbook of Texas, the community had a population of 525 in 2000. It is located within the Greater Houston metro area.

== History ==
I. A. Hankamer, a pioneer settler, inspired the name. The Hankamer-Stowell Canal Company (also known as the Farmers Canal Company) started irrigating a lot of rice in Chambers County in 1900, which drastically changed the lives of the locals. Four years later, the post office in Hankamer was opened. However, the population stayed modest until 1929 when the Hankamer oilfield in nearby Liberty County was discovered. Hankamer had four companies and 200 residents by the middle of the 1930s. More jobs were created by the R. H. Harlow sawmill. New oil and gas resources were discovered in the Hankamer area as a result of later prospecting, but in 1970, the population of this widely dispersed settlement was estimated to be fewer than 200. In 1983, Hankamer inhabitants were served by six enterprises. 189 people were living there in 1990 and 525 in 2000.

I.A. Hankamer served as postmaster. He was a son of settler John William Hankamer (1834 - 1907), who arrived in Texas in 1845 with his brothers Charles and Frederick, mother Johannette, and stepfather John Stengler, who sailed on the Harriet from Prussia to Galveston. They became citizens of the Republic of Texas. The Hankamers and Stenglers had planned to settle in the New Braunfels - Fredericksburg area, but news of Indian trouble prompted them to choose the area north of Anahuac. A grandson of I. A. Hankamer currently resides in his old house at Hankamer.

== Geography ==
Hankamer is located at the intersection of Texas State Highway 61 and Farm to Market Road 1663, 40 mi (64 km) southwest of Beaumont in northern Chambers County.

== Education ==
Anahuac Independent School District operates schools in the area.
