= Winnie Cumulus Broadcasting Tower =

Winnie Broadcasting Tower
- Interactive map of the Winnie Broadcasting Tower area

General information
- Status: Completed
- Location: Winnie, United States
- Coordinates: 29°56′9.8″N 94°30′39.4″W
- Completed: August 18, 2005
- Opening: 2005

Height
- Architectural: 609.6 m (2,000 ft)

The Winnie Broadcasting Tower is a 2,000 feet (609.6 m) tall guyed FM radio mast located northwest of Winnie, Texas, USA. It is the tallest structure in Texas, equaling the Liberman Broadcasting tower. It is currently owned by EMF and only has 103.7, KHJK on it.

== See also ==
- United States tallest structures
- List of masts
