= Rainbow Bridge & Veterans Memorial Bridge (Texas) =

- Port Arthur-Orange Bridge
- U.S. National Register of Historic Places
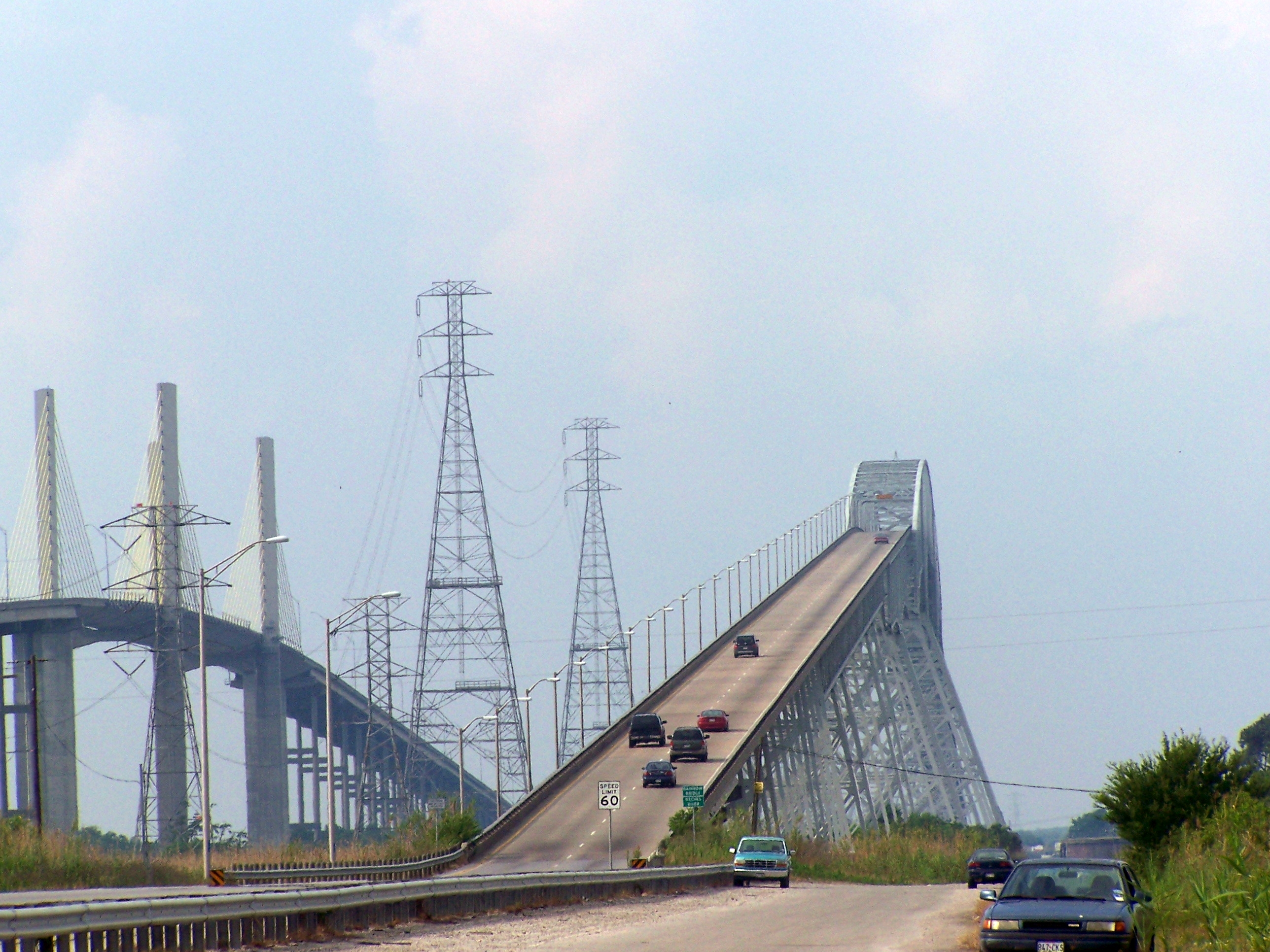
- Westbound approach to the Rainbow Bridge

- Location within Texas Location within the United States
- Location: SH 73 / SH 87 at the Jefferson and Orange county line
- Coordinates: 29°58′47″N 93°52′18″W
- Area: 4.8 acres (1.9 ha)
- Built: 1936
- Built by: Union Bridge and Construction Fort Pitt Bridge Works, et al.
- Architectural style: Cantilever through truss
- MPS: Historic Bridges of Texas MPS
- NRHP reference No.: 96001127
- Added to NRHP: October 10, 1996 (Rainbow Bridge)

The Rainbow Bridge and Veterans Memorial Bridge are two bridges that cross the Neches River in Southeast Texas just upstream from Sabine Lake. It allows State Highway 87 and State Highway 73 to connect Port Arthur in Jefferson County on the southwest bank of the river. Bridge City in Orange County is on the northeast bank.

== History ==
=== Rainbow Bridge ===
Construction on the Rainbow bridge, a cantilever truss bridge, began in 1936. It was contracted under the guidance of the Texas State Highway Department. Due to concerns by the upstream city of Beaumont about the bridge posing a threat to ship navigation, the Rainbow Bridge was built with a 680-foot (210 m) main span. In addition, it has a vertical clearance of 177 ft (54 m), which was intended to allow what was at the time the tallest ship in the U.S. Navy, USS Patoka, passage under the bridge (however, Patoka never did). However, the height of the bridge did allow the construction of jack up offshore drilling rigs at the Bethlehem Beaumont Shipyard. With 72 rigs built, the shipyard was one of the major sources of offshore rigs built in the United States.

The bridge was completed on September 8, 1938. The nearby town of Prairie View took on the name "Bridge City" in response.

Initially named the Port Arthur-Orange Bridge, it received its current name in 1957.

The bridge was listed in the National Register of Historic Places in 1996.

After the completion of the Veterans Memorial Bridge, the Rainbow Bridge was closed for renovations. On its re-opening in 1997, the Rainbow Bridge became one way, handling westbound traffic only.

In January 2014, refurbishment project started. It involved replacing pavement, repainting the ironwork, and repairing the supports. Work was complete in 2017.

=== Veterans Memorial Bridge ===
In 1988, construction began on the Veterans Memorial Bridge, a cable-stayed bridge.

This bridge runs parallel to the Rainbow Bridge, and was dedicated on September 8, 1990. With a vertical clearance of 143 feet (44 m), the bridge is somewhat shorter than its neighbor and has 640-foot-long (200 m) main span .

While it initially served both directions of traffic, the Veterans Memorial Bridge was reconfigured to serve eastbound traffic in 1997.

Throughout the closure of one lane on the Rainbow Bridge, a single lane of the bridge was converted into westbound lane, with temporary delineators installed to prevent head on collisions. This ended when repairs to that bridge were completed, the previous westbound lane returned to its previous configuration.

== See also ==
- List of bridges documented by the Historic American Engineering Record in Texas
- List of bridges on the National Register of Historic Places in Texas
- National Register of Historic Places listings in Jefferson County, Texas
