= Oyster Bayou =

Location
- Country: United States
- State: Texas

Physical characteristics
- Mouth
  - location: 29.5589°N 94.4750°W

Oyster Bayou is a river in Chambers County, Texas, which flows through the Jocelyn Nungaray National Wildlife Refuge.

== See also ==
- List of rivers of Texas
