= Smith Point, Texas =

- unincorporated community
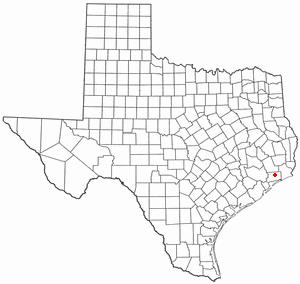
- Location of Smith Point, Texas
- Coordinates: 29°32′13″N 94°45′38″W
- Country: United States
- State: Texas
- County: Chambers
- Elevation: 7 ft (2.1 m)
- Time zone: UTC-6 (Central (CST))
  - Summer (DST): UTC-5 (CDT)
- Area code: 409
- GNIS feature ID: 1347284

Smith Point is an unincorporated community in Chambers County, Texas, United States. According to the Handbook of Texas, the community had a population of 150 in 2000. It is located within the Greater Houston metro area.

== History ==
En route to fortifying the unrest-plagued town at Atascosito in 1805, Spanish troops made landfall there. The area was most likely named in honor of John Smith, who in 1827 signed a petition denouncing Mexico for refusing to award land claimants in the Atascosito district title. In 1876, the Smith Point post office opened for business. Before the invention of the vehicle, Smith Point inhabitants relied mostly on water transportation for their travels. The 1930s saw about fifty people living at Smith Point. Before oil was discovered in 1944, the main sources of income for the local population were ranching and fishing. Since then, a large number of offshore and onshore oil and gas wells have been drilled. The bayfront community was identified in 1986 by several houses, summer cottages, oil and gas wells, and small fishing businesses, despite the post office closing in 1943. The population was 150 in 1990. In 2000, the population did not change. The population went up to 180 in 2010.

The Great Texas Coastal Birding Trail has a 20-foot observation tower in Smith Point that offers views of broad-winged hawks and other bird species. It is also home to the Candy Cain Abshier Wildlife Management Area.

== Geography ==
Smith Point is located on Farm to Market Road 562 and overlooks East Bay and Trinity Bay, 65 mi (105 km) southwest of Beaumont, 72 mi (116 km) southeast of Houston, and 24 mi (39 km) south of Anahuac in southern Chambers County. It is also 20 mi (32 km) from Galveston.

== Education ==
Anahuac Independent School District operates schools in the area.

== See also ==
- USS Granite City
