= Chambers County-Winnie Stowell Airport =

- IATA: none; ICAO: none; FAA LID: T90

Summary
- Airport type: Public
- Owner: Chambers County Commissioners Court
- Serves: Winnie / Stowell, Texas
- Elevation AMSL: 24 ft (7.3 m)
- Coordinates: 29°49′09″N 094°25′51″W

Map
- Location of airport in Texas T90 (the United States)

Runways
| Direction | Length | | Surface |
| Direction | ft | m | Surface |
|---|---|---|---|
| 17/35 | 3,600 | 1,097 | Asphalt |

Statistics (2023)
- Aircraft operations (year ending 4/4/2023): 6,000
- Based aircraft: 14
- Source: Federal Aviation Administration

Chambers County-Winnie Stowell Airport (FAA LID: T90) is a county-owned public-use airport located in Chambers County, Texas, United States. The airport is named after the unincorporated communities of Winnie and Stowell, both located east of the airport. It is also known as Tom Jenkins Memorial Airport.

== Facilities and aircraft ==
Chambers County-Winnie Stowell Airport covers an area of 112 acres (45 ha) at an elevation of 24 feet (7 m) above mean sea level. It has one runway designated 17/35 with a 3,600 by 75 ft (1,097 x 23 m) asphalt pavement.

For the 12-month period ending April 4, 2023, the airport had 6,000 aircraft operations, an average of 115 per week, all of which were general aviation. In April 2023, there were 14 aircraft based at this airport: 12 single-engine, 1 jet, and 1 helicopter.

== See also ==
- List of airports in Texas
