= Houston Airport System =

Department of Houston, Texas

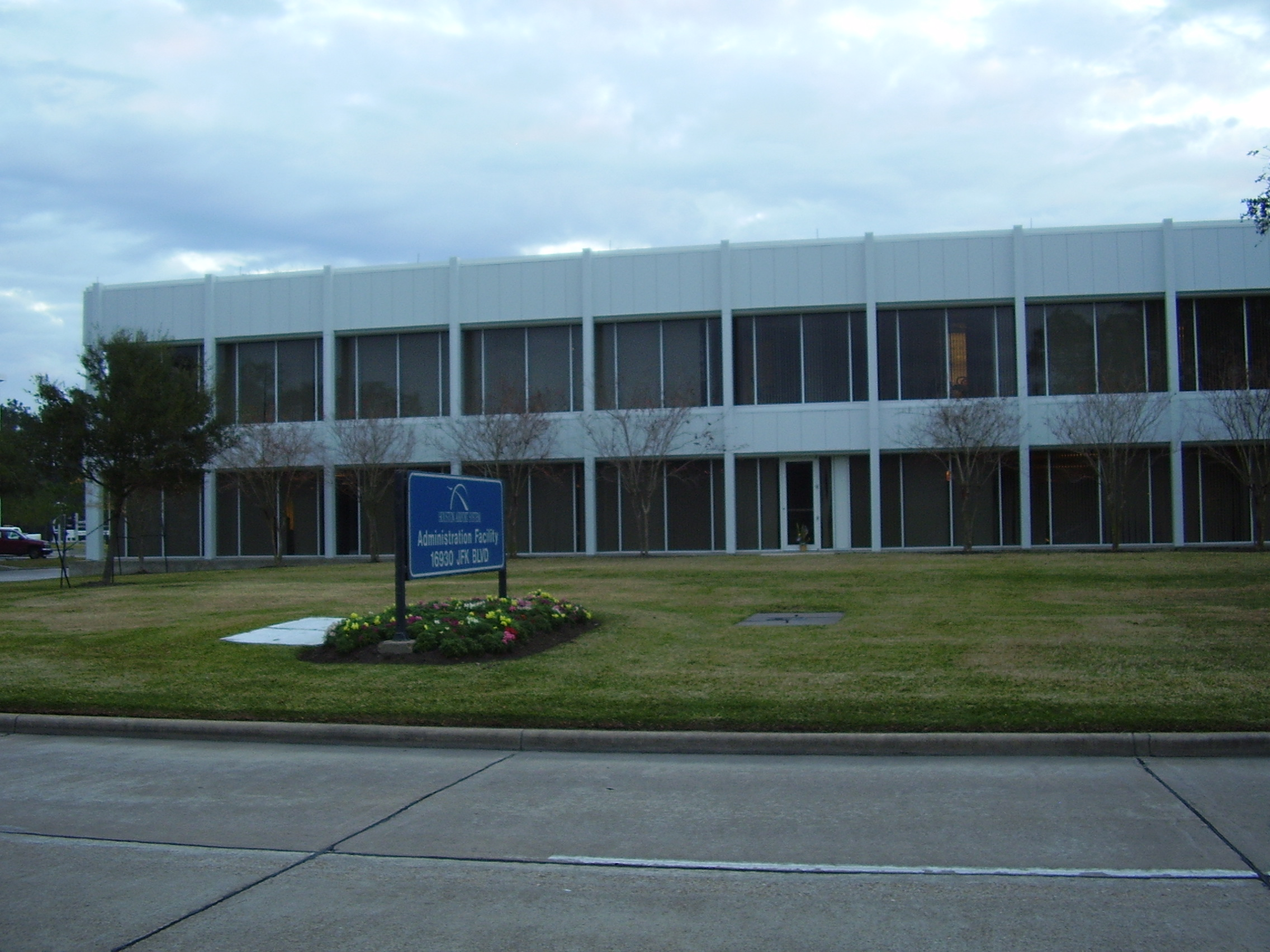
Houston Airport System Administration Building at 16930 JFK Boulevard, at George Bush Intercontinental Airport

Houston Airport System (HAS) is a department of the City of Houston, Texas, United States that manages city airports. Its administrative offices are on the property of George Bush Intercontinental Airport. It operates Bush, William P. Hobby Airport, and Ellington Airport in Houston.

The city of Houston acquired Hobby Airport in 1937. Previously named Houston Municipal Airport, it was renamed to honor William P. Hobby (former Governor of Texas and owner of the Houston Post) in 1967.

In 1969, Houston Intercontinental Airport opened. In 1997, it was renamed to honor George H. W. Bush, the 41st President of the United States.

In 1984, Ellington Airport (formerly Ellington Air Force Base, which was deactivated in 1976) became a part of the HAS system.

In January 2013, the airport system announced that free Wi-Fi would be available at both Bush and Hobby, and that it plans to select a new provider. In 2012 the system had made about $300,000 from the Boingo Wireless services, which are free for the first 45 minutes and available for a fee afterwards. The system said that modern travelers now expect free Wi-Fi, so it will change.

== See also ==
- Politics of Houston
- Transportation in Houston
