= Texas State Highway 65 =

State highway in Texas

State Highway 65

Route information
- Maintained by TxDOT
- Length: 15.495 mi (24.937 km)
- Existed: 1961–present

Major junctions
- West end: SH 61 / FM 562 near Anahuac
- East end: SH 124 at Stowell

Location
- Country: United States
- State: Texas
- Counties: Chambers

Highway system
- Highways in Texas; Interstate; US; State; Former; Toll; Loops; Spurs; FM/RM; Park; Rec
← SH 64	→ US 66

State Highway 65 (SH 65) is a Texas state route that runs for 15.495 miles (24.937 km) within Chambers County, from near Anahuac to Stowell. This route was designated on December 30, 1961, replacing a portion of SH 73 identified as SH 73-T.

== History ==
=== Previous route ===
SH 65 was originally designated on August 21, 1923 along a route from Mt. Pleasant to Gladewater, replacing part of SH 11. On September 26, 1939, this route was cancelled as it was part of U.S. Highway 271, which it was cosigned with since 1935.

== Junction list ==
The entire route is in Chambers County.

Location	mi	km	Destinations	Notes
			SH 61 / FM 562 south	Western terminus
			FM 1724 north	
			FM 1941 east	
			FM 1410 north	
Stowell			SH 124	Eastern terminus
1.000 mi = 1.609 km; 1.000 km = 0.621 mi
