= Chambers County, Texas =

County in Texas, United States

- County
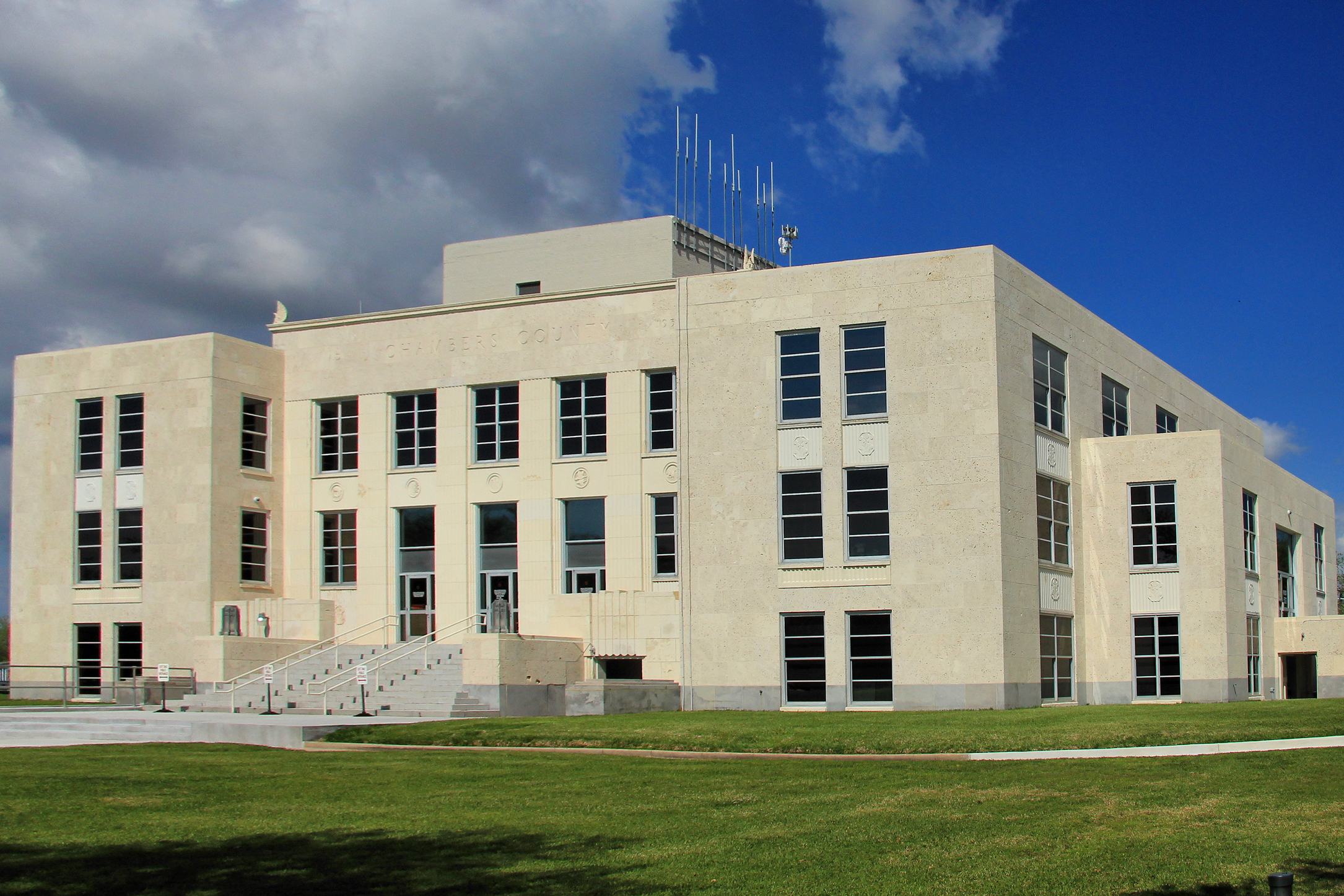
- The Chambers County Courthouse in Anahuac

- Location within the U.S. state of Texas
- Coordinates: 29°42′N 94°41′W
- Country: United States
- State: Texas
- Founded: 1858
- Named for: Thomas Jefferson Chambers
- Seat: Anahuac
- Largest city: Baytown

Area
  - Total: 871 sq mi (2,260 km^{2})
  - Land: 597 sq mi (1,550 km^{2})
  - Water: 274 sq mi (710 km^{2}) 31%

Population (2020)
  - Total: 46,571
  - Estimate (2025): 57,594 ▲
  - Density: 78.0/sq mi (30.1/km^{2})
- Time zone: UTC−6 (Central)
  - Summer (DST): UTC−5 (CDT)
- Congressional districts: 14th, 36th
- Website: www.chamberscountytx.gov

Chambers County is a county in the U.S. state of Texas. As of the 2020 census, its population was 46,571. The county seat is Anahuac. Chambers County is one of the nine counties that comprise Greater Houston, the Houston–Pasadena–The Woodlands metropolitan statistical area.

== History ==
Mission Nuestra Señora de la Luz, a Spanish mission in Texas, was established in 1756 near what is now Wallisville.

Chambers County was founded in 1858. It is named for Thomas Jefferson Chambers, a major general in the Texas Revolution.

In 2019, Atlas Air Flight 3591, a cargo flight operating for Amazon Air, crashed in the Trinity Bay, in Chambers County and near Anahuac, while flying from Miami to Houston. All three people on board were killed.

== Geography ==
According to the U.S. Census Bureau, the county has a total area of 871 square miles (2,260 km^{2}), of which 597 square miles (1,550 km^{2}) are land and 274 square miles (710 km^{2}) (31%) are covered by water.

The south and southwestern parts of the county lie in the Galveston Bay Area on the shores of Trinity Bay and East Bay. A small portion of the southeastern area lies on the coast of the Gulf of Mexico.

=== Adjacent counties ===
Liberty
		north
Harris	west	self	east	Jefferson
Galveston	southwest

=== National protected areas ===
- Jocelyn Nungaray National Wildlife Refuge (formerly Anahuac National Wildlife Refuge)
- Moody National Wildlife Refuge

=== State and local protected areas ===
- Candy Cain Abshier Wildlife Management Area
- Turtle Bayou Nature Preserve

== Communities ==
=== Cities ===
- Anahuac (county seat)
- Baytown (mostly in Harris County)
- Beach City
- Cove
- Mont Belvieu (small part in Liberty County)
- Old River-Winfree (small part in Liberty County)

Seabrook has portions of water surface area in Chambers County.

Shoreacres, which had portions of water surface area in Chambers County, consolidated into La Porte in 2026.

=== Census-designated places ===
- Oak Island
- Stowell
- Winnie

=== Unincorporated communities ===
- Double Bayou
- Hankamer
- Monroe City
- Seabreeze
- Smith Point
- Turtle Bayou
- Wallisville

== Demographics ==
Historical population
Census	Pop.	Note	%±
1860	1,508		—
1870	1,503		−0.3%
1880	2,187		45.5%
1890	2,241		2.5%
1900	3,046		35.9%
1910	4,234		39.0%
1920	4,162		−1.7%
1930	5,710		37.2%
1940	7,511		31.5%
1950	7,871		4.8%
1960	10,379		31.9%
1970	12,187		17.4%
1980	18,538		52.1%
1990	20,088		8.4%
2000	26,031		29.6%
2010	35,096		34.8%
2020	46,571		32.7%
2025 (est.)	57,594	▲	23.7%
U.S. Decennial Census; 1850–2010 2010 2020

=== Racial and ethnic composition ===
Chambers County, Texas – Racial and ethnic composition Note: the US Census treats Hispanic/Latino as an ethnic category. This table excludes Latinos from the racial categories and assigns them to a separate category. Hispanics/Latinos may be of any race.
Race / Ethnicity (NH = Non-Hispanic)	Pop 1980	Pop 1990	Pop 2000	Pop 2010	Pop 2020	% 1980	% 1990	% 2000	% 2010	% 2020
White alone (NH)	15,165	16,170	20,210	24,767	29,858	81.80%	80.50%	77.64%	70.57%	64.11%
Black or African American alone (NH)	2,634	2,540	2,525	2,817	3,148	14.21%	12.64%	9.70%	8.03%	6.76%
Native American or Alaska Native alone (NH)	89	49	84	134	161	0.48%	0.24%	0.32%	0.38%	0.35%
Asian alone (NH)	20	113	172	326	622	0.11%	0.56%	0.66%	0.93%	1.34%
Native Hawaiian or Pacific Islander alone (NH)	x	x	0	13	0	x	x	0.00%	0.04%	0.00%
Other race alone (NH)	3	21	25	25	215	0.02%	0.10%	0.10%	0.07%	0.46%
Mixed race or Multiracial (NH)	x	x	205	379	1,615	x	x	0.79%	1.08%	3.47%
Hispanic or Latino (any race)	627	1,195	2,810	6,635	10,952	3.38%	5.95%	10.79%	18.91%	23.52%
Total	18,538	20,088	26,031	35,096	46,571	100.00%	100.00%	100.00%	100.00%	100.00%

=== 2020 census ===
As of the 2020 census, the county had a population of 46,571. The median age was 35.8 years. 28.1% of residents were under the age of 18 and 12.5% of residents were 65 years of age or older. For every 100 females there were 99.3 males, and for every 100 females age 18 and over there were 98.1 males age 18 and over.

The racial makeup of the county was 70.0% White, 6.9% Black or African American, 0.7% American Indian and Alaska Native, 1.4% Asian, <0.1% Native Hawaiian and Pacific Islander, 9.3% from some other race, and 11.6% from two or more races. Hispanic or Latino residents of any race comprised 23.5% of the population.

45.9% of residents lived in urban areas, while 54.1% lived in rural areas.

There were 15,623 households in the county, of which 43.1% had children under the age of 18 living in them. Of all households, 62.2% were married-couple households, 14.7% were households with a male householder and no spouse or partner present, and 18.1% were households with a female householder and no spouse or partner present. About 17.0% of all households were made up of individuals and 7.3% had someone living alone who was 65 years of age or older.

There were 16,933 housing units, of which 7.7% were vacant. Among occupied housing units, 85.3% were owner-occupied and 14.7% were renter-occupied. The homeowner vacancy rate was 1.2% and the rental vacancy rate was 11.4%.

=== 2000 census ===
As of the 2000 census, 26,031 people, 9,139 households, and 7,219 families were residing in the county. The population density was 43 people/mi^{2} (17 people/km^{2}). The 10,336 housing units averaged 17 units per square mile (6.6/km^{2}). The racial makeup of the county was 81.88% White, 9.77% African American, 0.48% Native American, 0.67% Asian, 6.02% from other races, and 1.18% from two or more races. About 10.79% of the population were Hispanics or Latinos of any race.

Of the 9,139 households, 40.60% had children under the age of 18 living with them, 65.70% were married couples living together, 9.00% had a female householder with no husband present, and 21.00% were not families. About 17.80% of all households were made up of individuals, and 6.70% had someone living alone who was 65 years of age or older. The average household size was 2.82, and the average family size was 3.20.

In the county, the age distribution was 28.90% under 18, 8.20% from 18 to 24, 29.90% from 25 to 44, 24.00% from 45 to 64, and 9.00% who were 65 or older. The median age was 35 years. For every 100 females, there were 100.60 males. For every 100 females age 18 and over, there were 99.80 males.

The median income for a household in the county was $47,964, and for a family was $52,986. Males had a median income of $43,351 versus $25,478 for females. The per capita income for the county was $19,863. About 8.30% of families and 11.00% of the population were below the poverty line, including 13.30% of those under age 18 and 12.60% of those age 65 or over.

== Government ==
Chambers County is governed by a five-member commissioners' court, consisting of the county judge and four county commissioners. The county judge is elected to four-year terms in a countywide election. Commissioners are elected to four-year terms from single-member districts.

=== Chambers County Commissioners' Court ===
Office	Name	Political party	First elected	Area(s) represented
County Judge	Jimmy Sylvia	Republican	1996	Countywide
Commissioner, Precinct 1	Jimmy E. Gore	Republican	2016	Anahuac, Double Bayou, Hankamer, Oak Island, Seabreeze, Smith Point, Stowell, Wallisville, Winnie
Commissioner, Precinct 2	Mark Tice	Republican	2018	Beach City, Cove, Turtle Bayou, Wallisville
Commissioner, Precinct 3	Tommy Hammond	Republican	2006	Mont Belvieu, Old River-Winfree
Commissioner, Precinct 4	Ryan Dagley	Republican	2018	Baytown, Beach City

=== Elected Officials ===
Office	Name	Political party
County Attorney	Ashley Cain Land	Republican
County Clerk	Heather H. Hawthorne	Republican
County Court Judge	Cindy S. Price	Republican
District Attorney	Cheryl Swope Lieck	Republican
District Clerk	Patti Henry	Republican
Sheriff	Brian Hawthorne	Republican
Tax Assessor-Collector	Laurie G. Payton	Republican
Treasurer	Nicole Whittington	Republican
County Surveyor	Michael W. Chandler	

==== Constables ====
Office	Name	Political party	Area(s) represented
Constable, Precinct 1	Dennis Dugat	Republican	Stowell, Winnie
Constable, Precinct 2	John Mulryan	Republican	Anahuac, Turtle Bayou, Wallisville
Constable, Precinct 3	Donnie Standley	Republican	Double Bayou, Oak Island, Smith Point
Constable, Precinct 4	Ben L. "Butch" Bean	Republican	Mont Belvieu, Old River-Winfree
Constable, Precinct 5	Bradley W. Moon	Republican	Hankamer, Wallisville
Constable, Precinct 6	Kirk W. Ritch	Republican	Baytown, Beach City, Cove

=== United States Congress ===
Senators	Name	Political party	First elected	Level
Senate Class 2	John Cornyn	Republican	2002	Senior Senator
Senate Class 1	Ted Cruz	Republican	2012	Junior Senator
Representatives	Name	Political Party	First Elected	Area(s) Represented
Texas's 14th District	Randy Weber	Republican	2012	A small, unpopulated portion of the county that extends to the Gulf of Mexico, across the Intracoastal Waterway.
Texas's 36th District	Brian Babin	Republican	2014	All populated areas of the county

=== Texas Legislature ===
==== Texas Senate ====
District	Senator	Political party	First elected	Area(s) represented
4	Brandon Creighton	Republican	2014	Countywide, district also covers portions of Galveston, Harris, Jefferson, and Montgomery Counties

==== Texas House of Representatives ====
District	Representative	Political party	First elected	Area(s) represented
23	Terri Leo-Wilson	Republican	2022	Chambers County, Galveston County (part)

=== State Board of Education ===
District	Member	Political party	First elected	Area(s) represented
7	Julie Pickren	Republican	2022	Countywide, district also covers all of Brazoria, Galveston, Hardin, Jasper, Jefferson, Liberty, Newton, Orange, and Tyler Counties and most of Fort Bend County

=== Courts ===
==== Justices of the Peace ====
Office	Name	Political party
Justice of the Peace, Precinct 1	Celia Devillier	Republican
Justice of the Peace, Precinct 2	Michael W. Wheat	Republican
Justice of the Peace, Precinct 4	Blake D. Sylvia	Republican
Justice of the Peace, Precinct 5	David Hatfield	Republican
Justice of the Peace, Precinct 6	Larry Ray Cryer	Republican

==== District Courts ====
Office	Name	Political party	Area(s) represented
253rd District Court	Chap B. Cain, III	Republican	Countywide, district also covers Liberty County
344th District Court	Randy McDonald	Republican	Countywide

==== 1st Court of Appeals ====
	Name	Political party	First elected
Chief Justice	Terry Adams	Republican	2022
Place 2	Jennifer Caughey	Republican	2024
Place 3	Veronica Rivas-Molloy	Democrat	2020
Place 4	David Gunn	Republican	2024 (appointed)
Place 5	Amparo Guerra	Democrat	2020
Place 6	Andrew Johnson	Republican	2024
Place 7	Clint Morgan	Republican	2024
Place 8	Kristin Guiney	Republican	2024
Place 9	Susanna Dokupil	Republican	2024

==== 14th Court of Appeals ====
	Name	Political party	First elected
Chief Justice	Tracy E. Christopher	Republican	2020
Place 2	Kevin Jewell	Republican	2016
Place 3	Chad Bridges	Republican	2024
Place 4	Tonya McLaughlin	Republican	2024
Place 5	Maritza Antu	Republican	2024
Place 6	Katy Boatman	Republican	2024
Place 7	Ken Wise	Republican	2014, Appointed in 2013
Place 8	Brad Hart	Republican	2024
Place 9	Randy Wilson	Republican	2020 (appointed)

== Politics ==
As with much of the Southern United States, Democrats won locally up into the 21st century, but the county has now become solidly Republican, with President Donald Trump winning over 80% of the vote in the 2024 United States presidential election.

United States presidential election results for Chambers County, Texas
Year	Republican		Democratic		Third party(ies)	
Year	No.	%	No.	%	No.	%
1912	4	1.59%	217	86.45%	30	11.95%
1916	101	26.17%	239	61.92%	46	11.92%
1920	278	49.38%	240	42.63%	45	7.99%
1924	239	42.30%	315	55.75%	11	1.95%
1928	256	51.41%	242	48.59%	0	0.00%
1932	91	9.69%	843	89.78%	5	0.53%
1936	134	11.95%	984	87.78%	3	0.27%
1940	219	14.60%	1,279	85.27%	2	0.13%
1944	179	13.47%	1,038	78.10%	112	8.43%
1948	302	21.70%	787	56.54%	303	21.77%
1952	1,497	57.20%	1,116	42.64%	4	0.15%
1956	1,520	63.52%	860	35.94%	13	0.54%
1960	1,260	44.74%	1,524	54.12%	32	1.14%
1964	1,023	34.61%	1,921	64.99%	12	0.41%
1968	1,061	29.42%	1,217	33.74%	1,329	36.85%
1972	2,390	66.35%	1,206	33.48%	6	0.17%
1976	1,835	37.82%	2,927	60.33%	90	1.85%
1980	3,140	54.08%	2,517	43.35%	149	2.57%
1984	4,322	61.84%	2,632	37.66%	35	0.50%
1988	3,694	54.48%	3,035	44.76%	52	0.77%
1992	3,398	40.62%	2,832	33.85%	2,136	25.53%
1996	4,101	52.37%	2,876	36.73%	854	10.91%
2000	6,769	69.03%	2,888	29.45%	149	1.52%
2004	8,618	73.98%	2,953	25.35%	78	0.67%
2008	9,988	75.14%	3,188	23.98%	116	0.87%
2012	11,787	79.99%	2,790	18.93%	158	1.07%
2016	13,339	79.23%	2,948	17.51%	549	3.26%
2020	17,353	80.15%	3,997	18.46%	302	1.39%
2024	20,567	82.36%	4,192	16.79%	214	0.86%

United States Senate election results for Chambers County, Texas1
Year	Republican		Democratic		Third party(ies)	
Year	No.	%	No.	%	No.	%
2024	19,746	79.37%	4,617	18.56%	514	2.07%

United States Senate election results for Chambers County, Texas2
Year	Republican		Democratic		Third party(ies)	
Year	No.	%	No.	%	No.	%
2020	17,037	79.79%	3,786	17.73%	530	2.48%

Texas Gubernatorial election results for Chambers County
Year	Republican		Democratic		Third party(ies)	
Year	No.	%	No.	%	No.	%
2022	12,964	82.38%	2,559	16.26%	213	1.35%

== Education ==
Public School Districts

Local Primary and Secondary School Jurisdictions. Each are governed by their own respective school board.

- Goose Creek CISD
- Barbers Hill ISD
- Anahuac ISD
- East Chambers ISD
- La Porte ISD (parts of uninhabited Galveston Bay)

Higher Education

Community Colleges

- Lee College (Anahuac, Barbers Hill, East Chambers, and Goose Creek ISDs: in other words, for all land areas of Chambers County)
- San Jacinto College (La Porte ISD, which here means parts of uninhabited Galveston Bay)

Public libraries

The Chambers County Library System operates three libraries in the county.

- Chambers County Library (main branch) in Anahuac
- Juanita Hargraves Memorial Branch in Winnie
- Sam and Carmena Goss Memorial Branch in Mont Belvieu

== Transportation ==
=== Major highways ===
- Interstate 10
- State Highway 61
- State Highway 65
- State Highway 73
- State Highway 99 (Grand Parkway)
- State Highway 124
- State Highway 146

=== Airports ===
The county operates two airports in unincorporated areas:

- Chambers County Airport is east of Anahuac.
  - It was developed in the 1940s, and the county collaborated with the federal government to have it built. In August 1947, the federal government was to pay $23,322.
- Chambers County-Winnie Stowell Airport serves Stowell and Winnie.

In addition, RWJ Airpark, a privately owned airport for public use, is located in Beach City.

In the 1970s there had been a proposal to establish another airport in the county, but the Baytown city council objected to the proposal, arguing it was too close to another airport under private ownership.

The Houston Airport System stated that Chambers County is within the primary service area of George Bush Intercontinental Airport, an international airport in Houston in Harris County.

== See also ==
- List of museums in the Texas Gulf Coast
- National Register of Historic Places listings in Chambers County, Texas
- Recorded Texas Historic Landmarks in Chambers County
