= Stowell, Texas =

- Census-designated place
- Location of Stowell, Texas
- Coordinates: 29°45′50″N 94°21′46″W
- Country: United States
- State: Texas
- County: Chambers

Area
  - Total: 10.2 sq mi (26.5 km^{2})
  - Land: 10.0 sq mi (26.0 km^{2})
  - Water: 0.19 sq mi (0.5 km^{2})
- Elevation: 20 ft (6.1 m)

Population (2020)
  - Total: 1,743
  - Density: 175/sq mi (67.5/km^{2})
- Time zone: UTC-6 (Central (CST))
  - Summer (DST): UTC-5 (CDT)
- ZIP code: 77661
- Area code: 409
- FIPS code: 48-70520
- GNIS feature ID: 2410007

Stowell is an unincorporated community and census-designated place (CDP) in Chambers County, Texas, United States. The population was 1,743 at the 2020 census.

== Geography ==
Stowell is located on the eastern border of Chambers County and is bordered by Winnie to the north and Jefferson County to the east. Texas State Highway 124 passes through Stowell, leading north 3 miles (5 km) to Interstate 10 on the north side of Winnie and south 16 miles (26 km) to High Island on the Gulf of Mexico. Texas State Highway 65 leads west from Stowell 18 miles (29 km) to Anahuac, the Chambers County seat.

According to the United States Census Bureau, the Stowell CDP has a total area of 10.2 square miles (26.5 km^{2}), of which 10.0 square miles (26.0 km^{2}) is land and 0.2 square miles (0.5 km^{2}), or 1.91%, is water.

== Demographics ==
Historical population
Census	Pop.	Note	%±
1980	1,498		—
1990	1,419		−5.3%
2000	1,572		10.8%
2010	1,756		11.7%
2020	1,743		−0.7%
U.S. Decennial Census; 1850–1900 1910; 1920 1930 1940; 1950 1960 1970; 1980 1990 2000; 2010

Stowell first appeared as a census designated place in the 1980 United States census.

=== 2020 census ===
Stowell CDP, Texas – Racial and ethnic composition Note: the US Census treats Hispanic/Latino as an ethnic category. This table excludes Latinos from the racial categories and assigns them to a separate category. Hispanics/Latinos may be of any race.
Race / Ethnicity (NH = Non-Hispanic)	Pop 2000	Pop 2010	Pop 2020	% 2000	% 2010	% 2020
White alone (NH)	904	825	789	57.51%	46.98%	45.27%
Black or African American alone (NH)	486	371	300	30.92%	21.13%	17.21%
Native American or Alaska Native alone (NH)	4	3	2	0.25%	0.17%	0.11%
Asian alone (NH)	0	1	3	0.00%	0.06%	0.17%
Native Hawaiian or Pacific Islander alone (NH)	0	0	0	0.00%	0.00%	0.00%
Other race alone (NH)	2	3	12	0.13%	0.17%	0.69%
Mixed race or Multiracial (NH)	12	11	54	0.76%	0.63%	3.10%
Hispanic or Latino (any race)	164	542	583	10.43%	30.87%	33.45%
Total	1,572	1,756	1,743	100.00%	100.00%	100.00%

As of the 2020 United States census, there were 1,743 people, 642 households, and 462 families residing in the CDP.

=== 2000 census ===
As of the census of 2000, there were 1,572 people, 564 households, and 433 families residing in the CDP. The population density was 158.7 inhabitants per square mile (61.3/km^{2}). There were 619 housing units at an average density of 62.5 per square mile (24.1/km^{2}). The racial makeup of the CDP was 59.80% White, 30.92% African American, 0.64% Native American, 7.82% from other races, and 0.83% from two or more races. Hispanic or Latino of any race were 10.43% of the population.

There were 564 households, out of which 35.8% had children under the age of 18 living with them, 59.8% were married couples living together, 11.0% had a female householder with no husband present, and 23.2% were non-families. 19.0% of all households were made up of individuals, and 8.0% had someone living alone who was 65 years of age or older. The average household size was 2.79 and the average family size was 3.21.

In the CDP, the population was spread out, with 27.9% under the age of 18, 9.8% from 18 to 24, 30.1% from 25 to 44, 22.4% from 45 to 64, and 9.9% who were 65 years of age or older. The median age was 34 years. For every 100 females, there were 103.9 males. For every 100 females age 18 and over, there were 97.2 males.

The median income for a household in the CDP was $32,981, and the median income for a family was $39,792. Males had a median income of $35,154 versus $17,500 for females. The per capita income for the CDP was $15,371. About 10.9% of families and 18.8% of the population were below the poverty line, including 36.3% of those under age 18 and 12.2% of those age 65 or over.

== Education ==
East Chambers Independent School District serves Stowell.

Residents of East Chambers ISD are zoned to Lee College.

== Transportation ==
Chambers County-Winnie Stowell Airport, a general aviation airport in unincorporated Chambers County, serves Stowell and Winnie.
