= Winnie, Texas =

- CDP
- Location of Winnie, Texas
- Coordinates: 29°49′8″N 94°23′0″W
- Country: United States
- State: Texas
- County: Chambers

Area
  - Total: 4.0 sq mi (10.3 km^{2})
  - Land: 4.0 sq mi (10.3 km^{2})
  - Water: 0 sq mi (0.0 km^{2})
- Elevation: 23 ft (7.0 m)

Population (2020)
  - Total: 3,162
  - Density: 818/sq mi (315.9/km^{2})
- Time zone: UTC-6 (Central (CST))
  - Summer (DST): UTC-5 (CDT)
- ZIP code: 77665
- Area code: 409
- FIPS code: 48-79792
- GNIS feature ID: 2409611

Winnie is a census-designated place (CDP) in Chambers County, Texas, United States. The population was 3,162 at the 2020 census.

== History ==
The town plat was filed in 1895 by the Gulf and Inter-state Railway officials. The town was named after Fox Winnie, a railroad contractor who worked for the line. The Winnie and Loan Improvement Company attempted to market small lots of land, but due to poor sales, the company was dissolved in 1911. In 1941 an oilfield was discovered nearby, leading the way for the oil businessman Glenn H. McCarthy to establish a gas plant just east of the town. This development, along with the construction of Interstate 10, would lead to population growth. The East Chambers County Consolidated School District was established in 1931.

== Geography ==
Winnie is located at 29°49′8″N 94°23′0″W (29.818891, -94.383462). According to the United States Census Bureau, the CDP has a total area of 4.0 square miles (10 km^{2}), all land.

== Demographics ==
Historical population
| Census | Pop. | Note | %± |
|---|---|---|---|
| 1960 | 1,114 | | — |
| 1970 | 1,543 | | 38.5% |
| 1980 | 2,496 | | 61.8% |
| 1990 | 2,238 | | −10.3% |
| 2000 | 2,914 | | 30.2% |
| 2010 | 3,254 | | 11.7% |
| 2020 | 3,162 | | −2.8% |
U.S. Decennial Census; 1850–1900 1910; 1920 1930 1940; 1950 1960 1970; 1980 1990 2000; 2010

Winnie first appeared as an unincorporated community in the 1960 U.S. census; and as a census designated place in the 2000 U.S. census.

=== Racial and ethnic composition ===
Winnie CDP, Texas – Racial and ethnic composition Note: the US Census treats Hispanic/Latino as an ethnic category. This table excludes Latinos from the racial categories and assigns them to a separate category. Hispanics/Latinos may be of any race.
| Race / Ethnicity (NH = Non-Hispanic) | Pop 2000 | Pop 2010 | Pop 2020 | % 2000 | % 2010 | % 2020 |
|---|---|---|---|---|---|---|
| White alone (NH) | 2,429 | 2,345 | 1,912 | 83.36% | 72.07% | 60.47% |
| Black or African American alone (NH) | 152 | 103 | 102 | 5.22% | 3.17% | 3.23% |
| Native American or Alaska Native alone (NH) | 12 | 15 | 6 | 0.41% | 0.46% | 0.19% |
| Asian alone (NH) | 8 | 10 | 14 | 0.27% | 0.31% | 0.44% |
| Native Hawaiian or Pacific Islander alone (NH) | 0 | 0 | 0 | 0.00% | 0.00% | 0.00% |
| Other race alone (NH) | 1 | 1 | 17 | 0.03% | 0.03% | 0.54% |
| Mixed race or Multiracial (NH) | 17 | 31 | 109 | 0.58% | 0.95% | 3.45% |
| Hispanic or Latino (any race) | 295 | 749 | 1,002 | 10.12% | 23.02% | 31.69% |
| Total | 2,914 | 3,254 | 3,162 | 100.00% | 100.00% | 100.00% |

=== 2020 census ===
As of the 2020 census, Winnie had a population of 3,162. The median age was 36.8 years. About 26.1% of residents were under the age of 18 and 16.4% were 65 years of age or older. For every 100 females, there were 97.7 males, and for every 100 females age 18 and over, there were 94.5 males age 18 and over.

According to the 2020 census, 0.0% of residents lived in urban areas, while 100.0% lived in rural areas.

There were 1,096 households in Winnie, of which 35.5% had children under the age of 18 living in them. Of all households, 47.5% were married-couple households, 22.3% were households with a male householder and no spouse or partner present, and 24.3% were households with a female householder and no spouse or partner present. About 26.4% of all households were made up of individuals, and 12.4% had someone living alone who was 65 years of age or older.

There were 1,251 housing units, of which 12.4% were vacant. The homeowner vacancy rate was 1.4% and the rental vacancy rate was 7.3%.

=== 2000 Census data ===
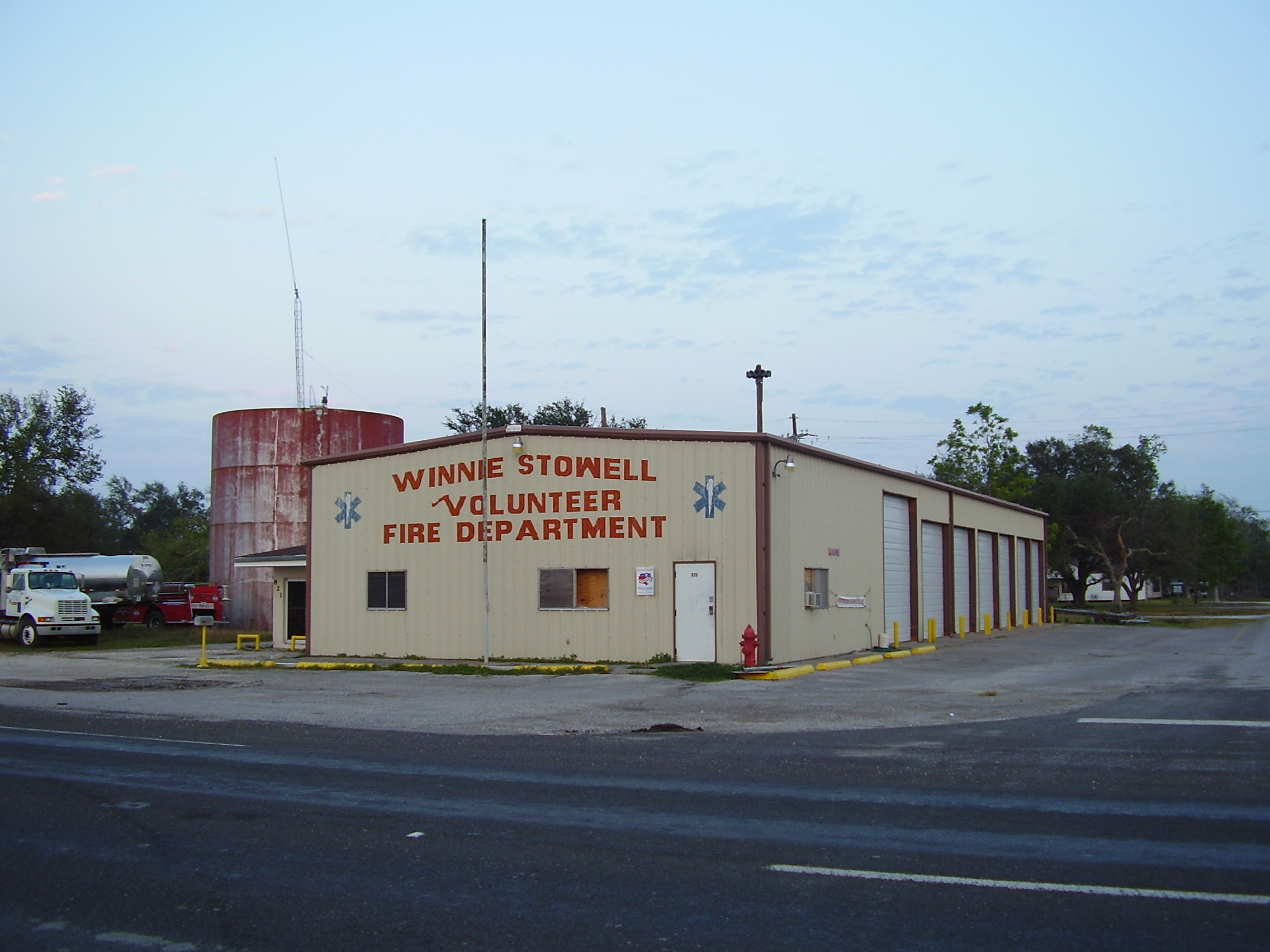
Winnie-Stowell Volunteer Fire Department

As of the census of 2000, there were 2,914 people, 1,039 households, and 735 families residing in the CDP. The population density was 732.9 inhabitants per square mile (283.0/km^{2}). There were 1,160 housing units at an average density of 291.8 per square mile (112.7/km^{2}). The racial makeup of the CDP was 87.27% White, 5.32% African American, 0.72% Native American, 0.27% Asian, 5.56% from other races, and 0.86% from two or more races. Hispanic or Latino of any race were 10.12% of the population.

There were 1,039 households, out of which 36.0% had children under the age of 18 living with them, 55.1% were married couples living together, 10.9% had a female householder with no husband present, and 29.2% were non-families. 24.6% of all households were made up of individuals, and 10.7% had someone living alone who was 65 years of age or older. The average household size was 2.64 and the average family size was 3.16.

In the CDP, the population was 27.4% under the age of 18, 8.8% from 18 to 24, 28.8% from 25 to 44, 20.9% from 45 to 64, and 14.2% who were 65 years of age or older. The median age was 36 years. For every 100 females, there were 101.8 males. For every 100 females age 18 and over, there were 99.2 males. The median income for a household in the CDP was $31,314, and the median income for a family was $33,816. Males had a median income of $31,083 versus $17,708 for females. The per capita income for the CDP was $13,779. About 10.7% of families and 14.3% of the population were below the poverty line, including 21.0% of those under age 18 and 6.8% of those aged 65 or over.

== Arts and culture ==
Winnie is the host of the Texas Rice Festival (TRF), which occurs during the first weekend of October annually. During the TRF, the farmers of Southeast Texas are appreciated, and there are live bands, singers, and a Beauty Pageant that takes place during this time. It starts on the Wednesday before the first weekend of October by a cook-off festival.

During the first weekend of every month, there is a flea market entitled Larry's Old Time Trade Days. This is a cultural attraction for much of Southeast Texas.

== Area attractions ==
Winnie Cumulus Broadcasting Tower, a 2,000 feet (609.6 m) tall guyed TV mast at 29°56′09.8″N 94°30′39.4″W, which is one of the world's tallest structures.

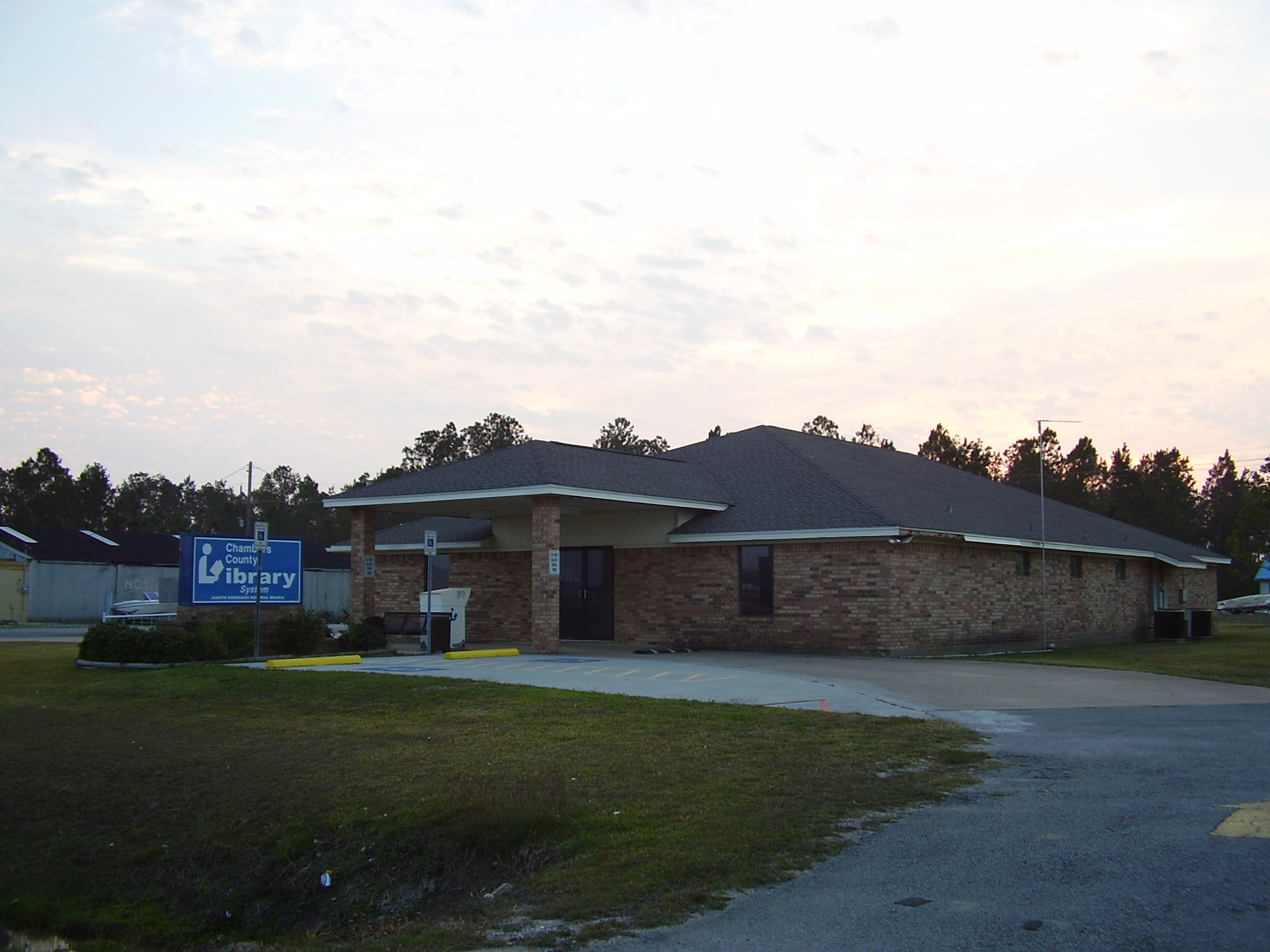
Juanita Hargraves Memorial Branch Library

== Education ==
East Chambers Independent School District serves Winnie.

The Juanita Hargraves Memorial Branch Library in Winnie is a branch of the Chambers County Library System.

Residents of East Chambers ISD are zoned to Lee College.

== Transportation ==
Chambers County-Winnie Stowell Airport, a general aviation airport in unincorporated Chambers County, serves Winnie and Stowell.

== Notable people ==
- Huey P. Meaux (1929–2011), record producer
