= Tornado outbreak of April 25–27, 1994 =

Weather event in the United States

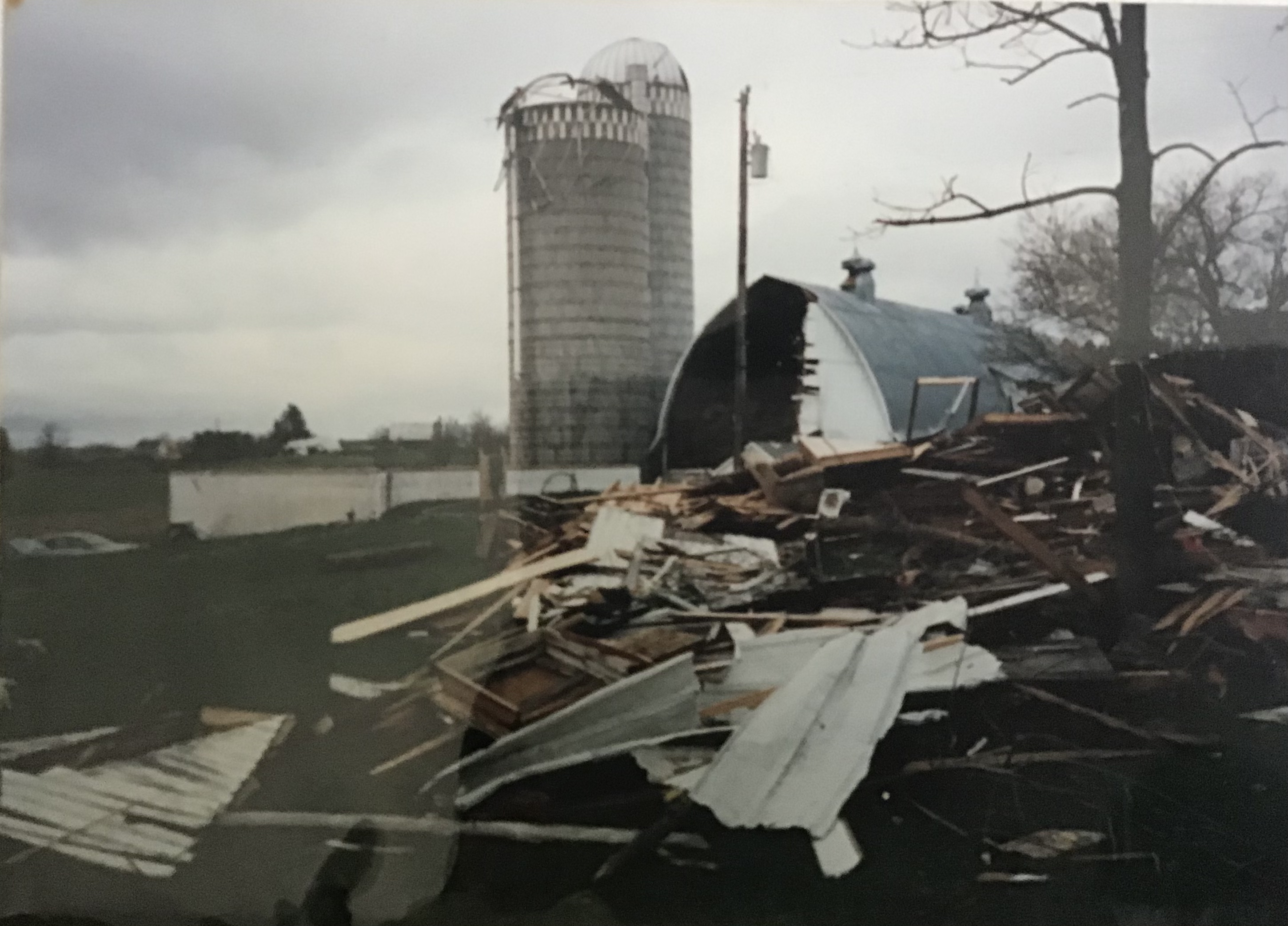
- Damage to the Kahl Farm in Prairie Farm, Wisconsin

Meteorological history
- Date: April 25–27, 1994

Tornado outbreak
- Tornadoes: 101
- Max. rating: F4 tornado
- Duration: 2 days, 3 hours, 12 minutes

Overall effects
- Fatalities: 6
- Damage: $127 million (1994 USD)
- Areas affected: Central and Eastern United States

The Tornado outbreak of April 25–27, 1994 was a widespread tornado outbreak that affected much of the Central and Southern Plains of the United States as well as the Midwest and the Deep South from Colorado to New York from April 25 to April 27, 1994. The entire outbreak killed six people across two states from two different F4 tornadoes near Dallas, Texas and West Lafayette, Indiana.

== Tornado event ==
Several scattered strong storms/supercells developed during the afternoon and late-evening hours on April 25. The most notable storm of the day produced several tornadoes across the Dallas–Fort Worth metroplex. The first tornado touchdown in the Fort Worth area but caused little if any damage. An F2 tornado shortly caused extensive damage to the town of DeSoto in Dallas County. Numerous structures were destroyed and the City Hall itself sustained major damage that totaled about $50 million. No fatalities were reported by this tornado. However, further east, the same storm intensified and produced a violent F4 tornado that traveled through the Lancaster area killing 3 and injured nearly 50 others while destroying much of the historic downtown square. In addition to the tornadoes, extensive hail was recorded across much of the Metroplex region. Total tornado and hail figures in Texas alone on this date was estimated at $300 million.

On April 26, the most productive storm affected portions of eastern Illinois just southeast of Chicago and portions of northern and central Indiana. Shortly before 11:00 PM, an F4 tornado tore through a mobile home park and a subdivision 2 miles west of West Lafayette killing three and injuring 70 others across Tippecanoe County. The mobile home park was very heavily damaged with numerous structures being totally demolished. A factory where one of the fatalities was also heavily damaged while the two other fatalities were inside the same home. Another tornado earlier in the day caused extensive damage to the town of Gainesville, Texas and injuring eight people. Several other tornadoes were reported in and around the Gainesville tornado at the same time the parent storm tore through most of the city. Across North Texas near the Red River Valley, over 20 tornadoes were confirmed along that area alone on April 26 from roughly near Wichita Falls to west of Texarkana, Arkansas. Activity ended on April 27 with weaker tornadoes across Missouri, Kentucky and Tennessee and minimal damage reported.

== Confirmed tornadoes ==
Confirmed tornadoes by Fujita rating
FU	F0	F1	F2	F3	F4	F5	Total
0	65	24	10	0	2	0	101

=== April 25 event ===
F#	Location	County	Time (UTC)	Path length	Damage
Colorado
F0	Widefield area	El Paso	2003	0.1 miles (0.16 km)	Brief touchdown in an open field without damage.
F0	E of Fountain	El Paso	2019	0.1 miles (0.16 km)	Brief touchdown in an open field without damage.
F0	SW of Lindon	Washington	2118	0.1 miles (0.16 km)	Brief touchdown in an open field without damage.
F0	S of Idalia	Yuma	2256	0.1 miles (0.16 km)	
Nebraska
F1	Central City area	Merrick	2135	3 miles (4.8 km)	Outbuildings were damaged, the roof of an auto shop was blown off and tree tops were twisted.
F0	W of Elgin	Antelope	2145	0.1 miles (0.16 km)	A van was picked up and rolled over into a ditch.
F0	SE of Elgin	Antelope	2200	0.1 miles (0.16 km)	Brief touchdown in an open field without damage.
F0	NE of Plainview	Pierce	2235	0.1 miles (0.16 km)	Two empty semi-trailers were blown over. Central irrigation pivot systems were twisted and blown over. Two county buildings and a garage were damaged as well.
F1	E of Bloomfield	Knox	2245	7 miles (11.2 km)	Damage to outbuildings and irrigation systems at several farms. One person was injured.
F0	SE of Bloomfield	Knox	2245	1.5 miles (2.4 km)	A storage tank was carried for a mile. A truck, a car and a garage were damaged as well.
South Dakota
F0	S of Worthing	Lincoln	2338	0.1 miles (0.16 km)	A door was torn off of a machine shed, a grain bin was caved in, a cattle shed was tipped over, and a hog house lost its roof.
F0	N of Renner	Minnehaha	0010	0.1 miles (0.16 km)	A mobile home was destroyed, and a ball park heavily damaged. A legion hall was damaged by flying debris. Farm buildings were also damaged, and power lines were downed.
F0	SW of Valley Springs	Minnehaha	0010	0.1 miles (0.16 km)	
F0	Garretson area	Minnehaha	0015	0.1 miles (0.16 km)	
Oklahoma
F1	N of Albion	Pushmataha, Latimer	2358	4.7 miles (7.5 km)	
F1	S of Whitesboro	Le Flore	0035	2 miles (3.2 km)	
F0	S of Fanshawe	Le Flore	0040	0.1 miles (0.16 km)	
Iowa
F1	Doon area	Lyon	0001	7 miles (11.2 km)	Extensive damage to two farms. Several buildings, a machine shed, a garage, and a brooder coop were downed.
Minnesota
F0	Luverne area	Rock	0015	0.1 miles (0.16 km)	Six mobile homes were damaged.
F0	SE of Round Lake	Jackson	0100	0.1 miles (0.16 km)	A building had roof damage and several trees were toppled.
Texas
F0	Fort Worth area	Tarrant	0042	0.1 miles (0.16 km)	Brief touchdown without known damage.
F0	SW of Duncanville	Dallas	0150	0.1 miles (0.16 km)	Trees and power lines were blown down.
F2	DeSoto area	Dallas	0200	2 miles (3.2 km)	75 homes were destroyed and 250 others were damaged. 10 businesses were destroyed and 35 others were damaged as well. A school was also damaged as well as the City Hall. 7 people were injured and damage was estimated at $50 million.
F4	Lancaster/Hutchins area	Dallas	0230	6 miles (9.6 km)	3 deaths – 1/2 mile wide tornado. 80 percent of Lancaster's historic downtown square was destroyed. 233 homes and 58 businesses were destroyed. 227 homes and two schools were also damaged. 48 people were injured.
F0	SW of Pecan Hill	Ellis	0258	0.1 miles (0.16 km)	Brief touchdown without damage.
F0	W of Midlothian	Ellis	0258	0.1 miles (0.16 km)	Brief touchdown without damage.
Source: Tornado History Project - April 25, 1994 Storm Data

=== April 26 event ===
F#	Location	County	Time (UTC)	Path length	Damage
Iowa
F1	Ames area	Story	1103	1 miles (1.6 km)	Several buildings were damaged or destroyed. Windows on cars and homes were also broken.
Minnesota
F2	W of Grant	Washington	1700	5 miles (8 km)	17 homes were damaged, 10 severely. One person was injured.
Texas
F0	NE of Olney	Archer	1750	0.1 miles (0.16 km)	
F2	SW of Windthorst	Archer	1805	9.5 miles (15.2 km)	
F0	NW of Bowie	Montague	1940	0.1 miles (0.16 km)	Brief touchdown without damage.
F0	NE of Alvord	Wise	1955	0.1 miles (0.16 km)	Brief touchdown without damage.
F0	E of Montague	Montague	2007	2.8 miles (4.5 km)	Fences and power lines were downed.
F1	W of St. Jo	Montague	2030	5 miles (8 km)	Power line were knocked down and 20 head of cattle were killed.
F0	S of St. Jo	Montague	2030	0.1 miles (0.16 km)	A mobile home office was blown over
F0	NW of Era	Cooke	2037	0.1 miles (0.16 km)	Brief touchdown without damage.
F2	Gainesville area (1st tornado)	Cooke	2045	16 miles (25.6 km)	One house and 15 mobile homes were destroyed. About 70 homes, 52 mobile homes, 14 businesses, a multi-story apartment complex, two barns and a school were damaged as well. Cars and trucks were flipped over and trees and power lines were down across the city. 8 people were injured.
F0	W of Gainesville	Cooke	2050	1 miles (1.6 km)	
F0	Gainesville area (2nd tornado)	Cooke	2105	0.1 miles (0.16 km)	Second tornado to strike Gainesville during the outbreak. Minor roof and tree damage occurred.
F0	N of Gainesville	Cooke	2110	4 miles (6.4 km)	Damage was limited to trees.
F0	N of Gordonville	Grayson	2130	0.1 miles (0.16 km)	Brief touchdown without damage.
F0	NE of Grayson	Grayson	2140	0.1 miles (0.16 km)	Brief touchdown without damage.
F0	N of Downing	Comanche	2152	0.1 miles (0.16 km)	Brief touchdown without damage.
F0	W of Comanche	Comanche	2211	0.1 miles (0.16 km)	
F0	S of Pottsboro	Grayson	2215	0.1 miles (0.16 km)	Brief touchdown without damage.
F0	SE of Clairette	Erath	2305	0.1 miles (0.16 km)	Brief touchdown without damage.
F2	W of Walnut Springs	Bosque	2320	1 miles (1.6 km)	One house, two mobile homes, and a barn were destroyed while a grain silo was damaged. Telephone poles were also knocked down. One person was injured.
F0	W of Lannius	Fannin	0000	0.1 miles (0.16 km)	Brief touchdown without damage.
F2	S of Ragtown	Lamar	0000	6 miles (9.6 km)	An RV was destroyed while 15 homes and 35 barns and outbuildings were damaged.
F0	W of Meridian (1st tornado)	Bosque	0006	0.1 miles (0.16 km)	Brief touchdown without damage.
F0	Bonham area	Fannin	0020	0.1 miles (0.16 km)	Brief touchdown without damage.
F0	SW of Selfs	Fannin	0020	0.1 miles (0.16 km)	Damage to trees and power lines.
F0	NE of Tigertown	Lamar	0025	0.1 miles (0.16 km)	Brief touchdown without damage.
F0	W of Meridian (2nd tornado)	Bosque	0130	0.1 miles (0.16 km)	Brief touchdown without damage.
F0	S of Woodland	Red River	0135	0.1 miles (0.16 km)	Brief touchdown without damage
F0	N of Alexander	Erath	0150	0.1 miles (0.16 km)	One barn was destroyed.
F1	N of Morgan	Bosque	0243	0.1 miles (0.16 km)	A mobile home was destroyed, and two permanent homes were heavily damaged.
Wisconsin
F1	S of Prairie Farm	Dunn, Barron	1303	4 miles (6.4 km)	Damaged 5+ houses, shifted house off foundation, destroyed many barns, bent farm equipment, and destroyed a turkey farm. After hitting the Kahl Farm, the tornado lifted and hours later dropped near Canton, WI.
F2	NE of Canton	Barron	1810	4 miles (6.4 km)	Same tornado that destroyed the turkey farm and damaged many house near Prairie Farm.
F2	Prentice area	Price	1920	12 miles (19.2 km)	A cabin, a trailer, and a barn were destroyed while a farm home and a construction company shed were damaged. A garage was knocked against a home and a mobile home was rolled.
F1	NE of Conover	Vilas	2055	4.5 miles (7.2 km)	
Oklahoma
F0	NE of Woodford	Carter	1830	0.1 miles (0.16 km)	
F1	E of Daisy	Atoka, Pushmataha	2025	9 miles (14.4 km)	
F1	N of Adel	Pittsburg	2046	3 miles (4.8 km)	
F1	N of Tuskahoma	Pushmataha	2102	12 miles (19.2 km)	
F1	NW of Albion	Latimer	2120	6 miles (9.6 km)	
F1	S of Yarnaby	Bryan	2318	8.5 miles (13.6 km)	
F0	S of Wade	Bryan	2335	1.5 miles (2.4 km)	
Mississippi
F0	NE of Horn Lake	DeSoto	2303	3 miles (4.8 km)	Damage occurred to several tree tops.
F0	NE of Hernando	DeSoto	0005	1 miles (1.6 km)	Damage was limited to trees.
F0	Red Banks area	Marshall	0025	0.5 miles (0.8 km)	Damage was limited to a few trees.
F0	N of Victoria	Marshall	0050	0.2 miles (0.32 km)	Damage limited to a few trees
Missouri
F1	S of Walnut Grove	Greene	2350	0.5 miles (0.8 km)	Two permanent homes were severely damaged, and a mobile home lost its roof. Trees were knocked down as well.
F0	E of Eudora	Polk	2355	2 miles (3.2 km)	Weak tornado in an open field without damage.
F1	Lebanon area	Laclede	0022	2.5 miles (4 km)	An airplane was flipped while signs, flags, and power lines were damaged or ripped.
F1	SE of Grovespring	Wright	0045	1 miles (1.6 km)	Five buildings, including two barns and a mobile home were destroyed.
F0	NE of Holts Summit	Callaway	0120	0.6 miles (1 km)	Damage was limited to a few trees.
F0	Crystal City	Jefferson	0235	0.3 miles (0.5 km)	Damage was limited to trees and power poles.
Illinois
F0	SW of Arcola (1st tornado)	Douglas	0230	1 miles (1.6 km)	Three outbuildings were blown over.
F1	SW of Arcola (2nd tornado)	Douglas	0231	3 miles (4.8 km)	Farm equipment and power lines were damaged.
F1	S of Brunswick, Indiana	Will, Lake, Indiana	0240	2 miles (3.2 km)	An antenna was knocked down. Several farm buildings were damaged as well.
F0	SE of Beecher	Will	0240	3 miles (4.8 km)	A house, grain bins, and farm buildings were damaged.
F1	Watseka area	Iroquois	0245	1 miles (1.6 km)	A cinder block building was moved from its foundation and damaged. Metal storage buildings were also damaged.
F2	E of Eberle	Effingham	0430	6 miles (9.6 km)	A two-car garage was destroyed and a home was partially knocked onto its side. A shed, a barn, farm buildings, and grain bins were damaged as well.
F0	NW of Allerton	Champaign	0445	0.3 miles (0.5 km)	An outbuilding was destroyed and another was moved from its foundation. A shed was bent and twisted as well.
F0	Oblong area	Crawford	0510	0.1 miles (0.16 km)	A trailer was overturned and trees were uprooted, with some falling onto homes.
Indiana
F0	N of Medaryville	Pulaski	0245	0.1 miles (0.16 km)	Damage to two barns and irrigation equipment.
F2	SE of Francesville to SW of Maxinkuckee	Pulaski, Fulton, Marshall	0245	20 miles (32 km)	One home and five farm buildings were destroyed, with other farm buildings being damaged. A mobile home was lifted and placed on top of a car.
F4	NW of West Lafayette to SE of Springboro	Tippecanoe, Carroll	0458	14 miles (22.4 km)	3 deaths – 11 homes were destroyed, 17 with major damage, and 7 with minor damage. 13 multi-family dwellings were heavily damaged. 64 mobile homes were heavily damaged or destroyed with lighter damage to 21 others at a mobile home park. Another three mobile homes were damaged as well as a Venetian blind factory and two gas stations. Vehicles were thrown and destroyed as well. 70 people were injured.
F1	SW of Whitehall	Owen	0510	0.2 miles (0.32 km)	A mobile home was destroyed and a church was damaged.
F0	SE of Economy	Wayne	0625	0.1 miles (0.16 km)	Brief touchdown without damage.
Source: Tornado History Project - April 26, 1994 Storm Data

=== April 27 event ===
F#	Location	County	Time (UTC)	Path length	Damage
Illinois
F1	West Frankfort area	Franklin	1005	1 miles (1.6 km)	A mobile home and a mine building were destroyed. One person was injured and several miners were trapped underground for a short period of time, but none of them were injured.
Tennessee
F0	Athens area	McMinn	1815	0.1 miles (0.16 km)	Damage was limited to trees.
F0	N of Gandy	Lawrence	1940	0.1 miles (0.16 km)	Damage was limited to a few trees.
New York
F1	W of Eagle Bridge	Rensselaer	1830	1.5 miles (2.4 km)	Caused mostly tree damage, though some light property damage occurred as well.
Missouri
F0	S of Acorn Corner	Pemiscot	1912	0.3 miles (0.5 km)	Brief touchdown without damage.
F0	S of Powersite	Taney	2127	0.5 miles (0.8 km)	Damage was limited to trees.
F0	Poplar Bluff area	Butler	2131	0.5 miles (0.8 km)	Brief tornado without damage.
F0	S of Gainesville	Ozark	2254	0.2 miles (0.32 km)	Brief touchdown without damage.
Kentucky
F0	SE of Hopson	Trigg, Caldwell	2300	1 miles (1.6 km)	
F0	SE of Gracey	Christian	2315	0.1 miles (0.16 km)	
Source: Tornado History Project - April 27, 1994 Storm Data

== See also ==
- List of North American tornadoes and tornado outbreaks
