= Gustine =

Gustine may refer to:

- Gustine, California, a city in Merced County
  - Gustine Airport
  - Gustine High School
- Gustine, Texas, a town in Comanche County
  - Gustine High School (Texas)
  - Gustine Independent School District
- Gustine Lake, a lake in Pennsylvania

== See also ==
- Gustin (disambiguation)
