= Energy, Texas =

- Unincorporated community
- Location within Texas Location within the United States
- Coordinates: 31°45′47″N 98°22′09″W
- Country: United States
- State: Texas
- County: Comanche
- Elevation: 1,398 ft (426 m)
- Time zone: UTC-6 (Central (CST))
  - Summer (DST): UTC-5 (CDT)
- Area code: 325
- GNIS feature ID: 1335464

Energy is an unincorporated community located in Comanche County in Central Texas, United States. A post office is the only business or service. According to the Handbook of Texas, the community had a population of 65 in 2000.

== History ==
The area in what is now known as Energy today was first settled around 1896. Will and Charlie Baxter operated a store in the community and named it for the residents who lived in the community, who were described as "energetic". A post office was established at Energy around 1896, with John W. Moore serving as postmaster. Its population was 67 in 1940 and decreased by two residents from 1990 through 2000.

Although Energy is unincorporated, it has a post office, with the ZIP Code of 76452.

On April 11, 1979, an F2 tornado struck Energy heading west toward Hico. Barns were destroyed and homes sustained roof damage. A woman was injured when her truck rolled into the ditch in which she was taking cover.

== Geography ==
Energy is located on Farm to Market Road 1702, 16 mi (26 km) southeast of Comanche in Comanche County.

== Education ==
Public education for the community of Energy is provided by the Gustine Independent School District.
