= Newburg, Texas =

- Unincorporated community
- Location within Texas Location within the United States
- Coordinates: 31°47′13″N 98°31′19″W
- Country: United States
- State: Texas
- County: Comanche
- Elevation: 1,352 ft (412 m)
- Time zone: UTC-6 (Central (CST))
  - Summer (DST): UTC-5 (CDT)
- Area code: 325
- GNIS feature ID: 1377178

Newburg is an unincorporated community located in Comanche County, in the U.S. state of Texas. According to the Handbook of Texas, the community had a population of 35 in 2000.

== Geography ==
Newburg is located at the intersection of Farm to Market Roads 1476 and 2561, off Texas State Highway 16, some 10 mi (16 km) south of Comanche in southern Comanche County.

== Education ==
Newburg's school joined with the Comanche Independent School District in the 1950s. The community continues to be served by the Comanche ISD to this day.
