= National Register of Historic Places listings in Comanche County, Texas =

Location of Comanche County in Texas

This is a list of the National Register of Historic Places listings in Comanche County, Texas.

This is intended to be a complete list of properties listed on the National Register of Historic Places in Comanche County, Texas. There are three listings on the National Register in the county, of which one is also a Recorded Texas Historic Landmark.

This National Park Service list is complete through NPS recent listings posted March 21, 2025.

== Current listings ==
The locations of National Register properties may be seen in a mapping service provided.

	Name on the Register	Image	Date listed	Location	City or town	Description
1	Comanche Downtown Historic District	Comanche Downtown Historic District	July 7, 2023 (#100009117)	Roughly bounded by West College and Oak Aves., North Pearl St., and the rear property line along North Mary St. 31°53′51″N 98°36′15″W	Comanche	
2	Captain James & Susannah Cunningham Homestead	Captain James & Susannah Cunningham Homestead	December 5, 2012 (#12000999)	19601 TX 16 S 31°44′34″N 98°31′21″W	Comanche	Recorded Texas Historic Landmark
3	St. Louis and San Francisco Railway Depot (Frisco Depot)	St. Louis and San Francisco Railway Depot (Frisco Depot)	December 4, 2017 (#100001872)	304 S. Austin St. 31°53′42″N 98°36′12″W	Comanche	

== See also ==
- National Register of Historic Places listings in Texas
- Recorded Texas Historic Landmarks in Comanche County
