= Lamkin, Texas =

- Census-designated place
- Location within Texas Location within the United States
- Coordinates: 31°49′27″N 98°15′43″W
- Country: United States
- State: Texas
- County: Comanche

Area
  - Total: 0.68 sq mi (1.75 km^{2})
  - Land: 0.68 sq mi (1.75 km^{2})
  - Water: 0 sq mi (0.0 km^{2})
- Elevation: 1,063 ft (324 m)
- Time zone: UTC-6 (Central (CST))
  - Summer (DST): UTC-5 (CDT)
- ZIP Code: 76455 (Gustine)
- Area code: 325
- FIPS code: 48-41176
- GNIS feature ID: 2805765

Lamkin is an unincorporated community and census-designated place (CDP) in Comanche County, Texas, United States. It was first listed as a CDP prior to the 2020 census. As of the 2020 census, Lamkin had a population of 46.

The community is located in the southeastern part of the county, along Texas State Highway 36, which leads northwest 21 miles (34 km) to Comanche, the county seat, and southeast 12 miles (19 km) to Hamilton. The Leon River, part of the Brazos River watershed, forms the eastern edge of the CDP.

== Demographics ==
Historical population
Census	Pop.	Note	%±
2020	46		—
U.S. Decennial Census; 1850–1900 1910; 1920 1930 1940; 1950 1960 1970; 1980 1990 2000; 2010 2020

Lamkin first appeared as a census designated place in the 2020 U.S. census.

=== 2020 Census ===
Lamkin CDP, Texas – Racial and ethnic composition Note: the US Census treats Hispanic/Latino as an ethnic category. This table excludes Latinos from the racial categories and assigns them to a separate category. Hispanics/Latinos may be of any race.
Race / Ethnicity (NH = Non-Hispanic)	Pop 2020	% 2020
White alone (NH)	31	67.39%
Black or African American alone (NH)	0	0.00%
Native American or Alaska Native alone (NH)	0	0.00%
Asian alone (NH)	0	0.00%
Native Hawaiian or Pacific Islander alone (NH)	0	0.00%
Other race alone (NH)	0	0.00%
Mixed race or Multiracial (NH)	1	2.17%
Hispanic or Latino (any race)	14	30.43%
Total	46	100.00%
