= Rucker, Texas =

- Unincorporated community
- Location within Texas Location within the United States
- Coordinates: 32°09′55″N 98°36′10″W
- Country: United States
- State: Texas
- County: Comanche
- Elevation: 1,391 ft (424 m)
- Time zone: UTC-6 (Central (CST))
  - Summer (DST): UTC-5 (CDT)
- Area code: 325
- GNIS feature ID: 1378994

Rucker is an unincorporated community located in Comanche County, in the U.S. state of Texas.

== History ==
The community was named after Calvin Rucker, who established a gin in 1890.

== Geography ==
Rucker is located on Texas State Highway 6 on the ex Missouri-Kansas-Texas Railroad, now Fort Worth & Western Railway, 5 mi (8.0 km) northwest of De Leon in northern Comanche County.

== Education ==
Rucker had its own school at one time and sat on land donated by Pat Johnson. Today, the community is served by the Gorman Independent School District.
