= Hasse, Texas =

- Unincorporated community
- Location within Texas Location within the United States
- Coordinates: 31°56′12″N 98°29′19″W
- Country: United States
- State: Texas
- County: Comanche
- Elevation: 1,201 ft (366 m)
- Time zone: UTC-6 (Central (CST))
  - Summer (DST): UTC-5 (CDT)
- Area code: 325
- GNIS feature ID: 1378424

Hasse is an unincorporated community located in Comanche County, in the U.S. state of Texas. According to the Handbook of Texas, the community had a population of 43 in 2000.

== Geography ==
Hasse is located on U.S. Routes 67 and 377 on the Fort Worth and Rio Grande Railway, 6 mi (9.7 km) east of Comanche in central Comanche County.

== Education ==
Hasse's local school joined the Comanche Independent School District in 1955 and continues to be served by Comanche ISD to this day.
