= Tommy Humphrey =

American football player (born 1950)

No. 52, 51
- Position: Offensive lineman

Personal information
- Born: March 24, 1950 (age 76); Comanche, Texas, U.S.
- Listed height: 6 ft 6 in (1.98 m)
- Listed weight: 260 lb (118 kg)

Career information
- High school: Comanche (Comanche, Texas)
- College: Abilene Christian
- NFL draft: 1973: 10th round, 256th overall pick

Career history
- Cleveland Browns (1973)*; Denver Broncos (1973); Kansas City Chiefs (1974); Atlanta Falcons (1975)*; Calgary Stampeders (1978–1979); BC Lions (1980)
- * Offseason or practice squad member only
- Stats at Pro Football Reference

Thomas Gale Humphrey (born March 24, 1950) is an American former professional football offensive lineman who played one season with the Kansas City Chiefs of the National Football League (NFL). He played college football at Abilene Christian and was selected by the Cleveland Browns in the 10th round of the 1973 NFL draft. He also played for the Calgary Stampeders and BC Lions of the Canadian Football League (CFL).

== Early life and college ==
Thomas Gale Humphrey was born on March 24, 1950, in Comanche, Texas. He attended Comanche High School.

Humphrey played college football for the Abilene Christian of Abilene Christian University.

== Professional career ==
Humphrey was selected by the Cleveland Browns in the tenth round, with the 256th overall pick, of the 1973 NFL draft. He officially signed with the team on April 12. However, he was later released.

On December 2, 1973, it was reported that Humphrey had signed with the Denver Broncos. He was released on September 10, 1974, without appearing in any games.

Humphrey was signed by the Kansas City Chiefs on November 13, 1974. He played in five games for the Chiefs during the 1974 season.

On August 5, 1975, Humphrey was traded to the Atlanta Falcons for John Nessel.

Humphrey dressed in all 16 games for the Calgary Stampeders of the Canadian Football League (CFL) in 1978. The Stampeders finished the 1978 season with a 9–4–3 record. He dressed in 13 games in 1979 before being waived in October.

Humphrey signed a two-year contract with the BC Lions of the CFL on November 22, 1979. He dressed in five games for the Lions during the 1980 CFL season before being released on August 16, 1980.

== Personal life ==
Humphrey's son, Jay Humphrey, was selected by the Minnesota Vikings in the fourth round of the 1999 NFL draft.
