= Beattie, Texas =

- Unincorporated community
- Location within Texas Location within the United States
- Coordinates: 32°02′18″N 98°41′33″W
- Country: United States
- State: Texas
- County: Comanche
- Elevation: 1,339 ft (408 m)
- Time zone: UTC-6 (Central (CST))
  - Summer (DST): UTC-5 (CDT)
- Area code: 325
- GNIS feature ID: 1377979

Beattie is an unincorporated community located in Comanche County, in the U.S. state of Texas. According to the Handbook of Texas, the community had a population of 50 in 2000. The town was named for the pioneer who founded it, Charles F. Beatty.

== Geography ==
Beattie is located on Farm to Market Road 588, off Texas State Highway 36, 11 mi (18 km) southwest of De Leon and 11 mi (18 km) northwest of Comanche in north-central Comanche County.

== Education ==
Public education in the community of Beattie is provided by the Comanche Independent School District.
