= Comyn, Texas =

- Unincorporated community
- Location within Texas Location within the United States
- Coordinates: 32°04′23″N 98°28′13″W
- Country: United States
- State: Texas
- County: Comanche
- Elevation: 1,253 ft (382 m)
- Time zone: UTC-6 (Central (CST))
  - Summer (DST): UTC-5 (CDT)
- Area code: 325
- GNIS feature ID: 1378148

Comyn is an unincorporated community located in Comanche County in Central Texas, United States. According to the Handbook of Texas, it had a population of 40 in 2000.

== History ==
The area was originally settled around 1875 and was originally named "Theney" for W. F. Matheney, a man who owned a trading post. Comyn was renamed "Comyn" for M. T. Comyn, who was the construction foreman for the railroad around 1881 when the Texas Central Railroad was built through the townsite and a depot opened. A post office was established at Comyn in 1909 and remained in operation until the late 1950s. The town also had a lumberyard, a blacksmith shop, a cotton gin, several stores, and a Woodmen of the World lodge. In 1918, the Humble Pipeline Company built a pipeline connecting Comyn with the Humble company's terminal at Webster. A tank farm was built in the community and a large tent city arrived, but construction ended in 1919. The Humble Oil pipeline was then expanded west toward Kempner, while its trunk line was expanded to Webster. Decreasing oil production in West Texas led to Comyn's decline. In 1976, Comyn had a Baptist church, a Humble Oil Company (now Exxon) office, and the Shell Peanut Company. Most businesses left the area by 1980, but the oil company continued to have its office and pump station in the community. Comyn's population was 30 in 1974 and 27 in 1974 through 1990. However, in 2000 the population of Comyn was reported to have grown to 40.

Today, Comyn has a cemetery, numerous homes, and the Golden Peanut Company, which is still in operation. Numerous storage tanks can be seen along FM 1496 at the Golden Peanut Company's plant, which was once used by Humble Pipeline Company to store oil but has since been converted to store peanuts. Comyn continues to retain its rail service. The former Texas Central Katy Railroad line is still in use by the Fort Worth and Western Railroad from Dublin to Gorman and is still known as the "Peanut Line". It leads its way from the Waco area to Stamford, with a branch from De Leon to Cross Plains.

In 1969, a historical marker was erected in Comyn. According to the marker, the rapid settlement of this area followed after the removal of an Indian threat. One of the first families to settle in Comyn was that of B. F. Barnes, at nearby Jones Crossing, in 1876. His great-grandson Ben Barnes, a former Lieutenant Governor of Texas, was raised in Comyn. It also had a drug store, a cafe, and a barbershop.

A balloon that was sent to the United States during World War II from Japan was spotted in Comyn. It was described as being about 30 ft (9.1 m) high in the air and carried five metal canisters.

== Geography ==
Comyn is located in the east-northeastern part of Comanche County, along Farm to Market Road 1496 and the Fort Worth and Western Railroad. It is also located approximately 3 mi (4.8 km) south of Texas State Highway 6, 8 mi (13 km) southeast of De Leon, 4 mi (6.4 km) west of Dublin, 16 mi (26 km) southwest of Stephenville, and 23 mi (37 km) northeast of Comanche.

== Education ==
Comyn's first school was named Theney School. Another school was built in Comyn in 1924 and remained in operation until 1952, when low enrollment forced it to close. Today, the community is served by the De Leon Independent School District.
