= MKN =

MKN, Mkn or mkn may refer to:

- Macedonian denar, the currency of North Macedonia
- Markarian galaxies, are often abbreviated "Mkn" (also Mrk, Mkr, Ma, Mk, Mark), followed by their four-digit number
- The ISO 639:m, language code for Malay
- Mekong Airlines, ICAO airline code
- Comanche County–City Airport, Comanche, Texas; FAA airport code
