= Hazel Dell =

Hazel Dell may refer to:

- Hazel Dell, Saskatchewan, Canada
  - Rural Municipality of Hazel Dell No. 335, Saskatchewan
- Hazel Dell, Illinois, USA
- Hazel Dell, Comanche County, Texas, USA
- Hazel Dell, Washington, USA
- Hazel Dell Township, Pottawattamie County, Iowa
