= Duster, Texas =

- Unincorporated community
- Location within Texas Location within the United States
- Coordinates: 32°06′18″N 98°40′36″W
- Country: United States
- State: Texas
- County: Comanche
- Elevation: 1,408 ft (429 m)
- Time zone: UTC-6 (Central (CST))
  - Summer (DST): UTC-5 (CDT)
- Area code: 325
- GNIS feature ID: 1378237

Duster is an unincorporated community in Comanche County, Texas, United States. According to the Handbook of Texas, the community had a population of 25 in 2000.

== History ==
A post office called Duster was established in 1891 and remained in operation until 1927. The community was first settled in the early 1880s. It was thought to be named Duster because a man blew the dust off a piece of paper that he picked up when the community's first settlers attended a meeting to discuss the name for the post office. Its first location was at Polecat Pond, then was moved two miles north when the Texas Central Railroad built through the area. When the railroad closed, the post office moved back to its original location. Belle Dukes was the first postmaster. The community's population was 50 in 1940, a figure which was halved by 2000.

== Geography ==
Duster is located at the intersection of Fms 587 and 679, approximately 24 mi (39 km) northwest of Comanche in north-central Comanche County.

== Education ==
The community of Duster is served by the De Leon Independent School District.

== See also ==
- Texas State Highway 6
