= Amity, Texas =

- Unincorporated community
- Location within Texas Location within the United States
- Coordinates: 32°03′34″N 98°53′01″W
- Country: United States
- State: Texas
- County: Comanche
- Elevation: 1,604 ft (489 m)
- Time zone: UTC-6 (Central (CST))
  - Summer (DST): UTC-5 (CDT)
- Area code: 325
- GNIS feature ID: 1377934

Amity is an unincorporated community in Comanche County, in the U.S. state of Texas.

== History ==
Amity was first settled in the 1870s. Possibly named after the temperament of the area's locals, the community was still standing in 1992 and had a cemetery and a church.

== Geography ==
Amity is located on an unnamed country road off Texas State Highway 36, 2 mi (3.2 km) away from the Brown County line and 18 mi (29 km) northwest of Comanche in the northwestern corner of Comanche County.

== Education ==
Amity had its own school from 1902 to 1906. Today, the community is served by the May Independent School District.
