= Proctor Lake =

Reservoir in Texas, United States

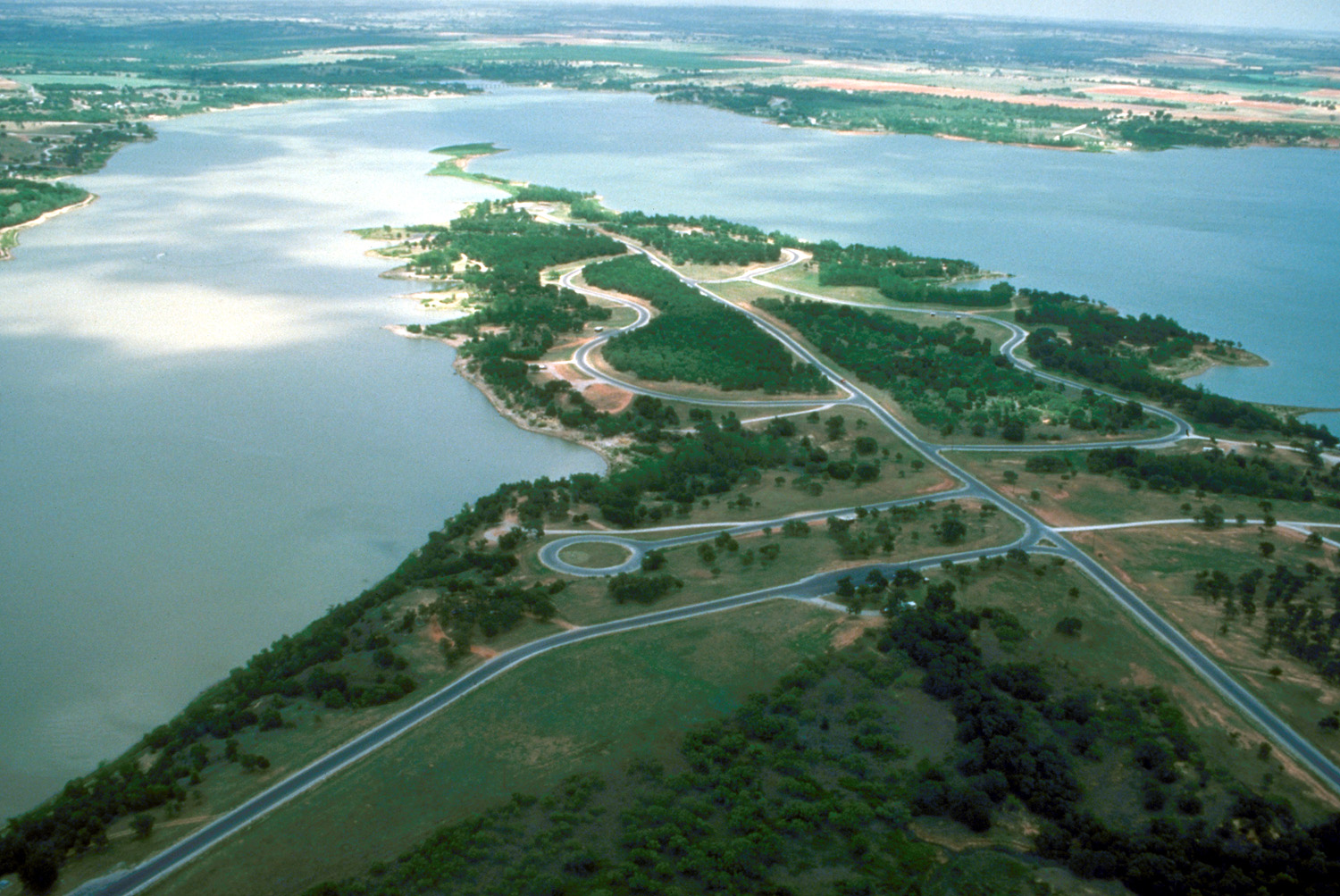
- Proctor Lake, Comanche County, Texas

- Location within Texas Location within the United States
- Location: Comanche County, west of Proctor, Texas
- Coordinates: 31°58′21″N 98°28′36″W
- Type: Flood control reservoir
- Basin countries: United States
- Surface area: 4,537 acres (1,836 ha)
- Max. depth: 34 ft (10 m)
- Water volume: 59,300 acre⋅ft (0.0731 km^{3})
- Surface elevation: 1,162 ft (354 m)

Proctor Lake is a U.S. Army Corps of Engineers reservoir along the Leon River located in Comanche County in the U.S. state of Texas, around 3 miles (5 km) west of Proctor, Texas. Proctor Lake Dam and the reservoir are managed by the Fort Worth District of the U.S. Army Corps of Engineers. The reservoir was officially impounded in 1963, with a total capacity of 374,200 acre-feet, and serves to provide flood control and drinking water for the communities downstream, as well as recreation opportunities.

Recent droughts in the southwestern U.S. have reduced the size of the lake and threatened nearby vegetation.

== Fish populations ==
Proctor Lake has been stocked with species of fish intended to improve the utility of the reservoir for recreational fishing, including largemouth bass, hybrid striped bass, catfish, and white crappie.
