= Gustine High School (Texas) =

Gustine School

Location
- 503 West Main Street; Gustine, Texas 76455; United States; 31.847137°N 98.410893°W

Information
- Type: Public high school
- School district: Gustine Independent School District
- Superintendent: Patti Blue
- Principal: Alan Luker
- Faculty: 18.49 (FTE)
- Grades: PreK-12
- Enrollment: 129 (2023–2024)
- Student to teacher ratio: 6.98
- Colors: Orange, white, and black
- Team name: Tigers
- Website: Official Website

Gustine High School is a public primary, intermediate, and high school located in Gustine, Texas (USA) and classified as a 1A school by the UIL. It is part of the Gustine Independent School District located in central Comanche County. In 2015, the school was rated "Met Standard" by the Texas Education Agency.

== Athletics ==
The Gustine Tigers compete in the following sports:

- Basketball
- Cross Country
- Six Man Football
- Golf
- Powerlifting
- Tennis
- Track & Field
- Volleyball
