= Texas State Highway 6 =

State highway in Texas

State Highway 6
- SH 6 highlighted in red, business loops in blue

Route information
- Maintained by TxDOT
- Length: 476.4 mi (Note: The certified mileage given is shorter than the actual mileage as TxDOT considers SH 6 to be discontinuous at rather than concurrent with US 79, US 180, US 183, US 190, US 277, US 281, US 283, and US 290.) (766.7 km)
- Existed: April 4, 1917–present

Major junctions
- South end: I-45 / SH 146 in La Marque
- I-69 / US 59 in Sugar Land; I-10 / US 90 in Houston; I-35 in Waco; I-20 in Eastland
- North end: SH-6 north of Quanah

Location
- Country: United States
- State: Texas

Highway system
- Highways in Texas; Interstate; US; State; Former; Toll; Loops; Spurs; FM/RM; Park; Rec
← RE 5	→ Spur 6

State Highway 6 (SH 6) runs from the Red River, the Texas–Oklahoma state line, to northwest of Galveston. In Sugar Land and Missouri City, it is known as Alvin-Sugarland Road and runs perpendicular to Interstate 69/U.S. Highway 59 (I-69/US 59). In the Houston area, it runs north to Farm to Market Road 1960 (FM 1960), then northwest along US 290 to Hempstead, and south to Westheimer Road and Addicks, and is known as Addicks Satsuma Road. In the Bryan–College Station area, it is known as the Earl Rudder Freeway. In Hearne, it is known as Market Street. In Calvert, it is known as Main Street. For most of its length, SH 6 is not a limited-access road. In 1997, the Texas Legislature designated SH 6 as the Texas Korean War Veterans Memorial Highway.

== History ==
=== Historic routes ===
Historic SH 6

SH 6 was one of the original 25 state highways proposed on June 21, 1917, overlaying the King of Trails Highway. From 1919, the routing mostly followed present-day US 75 from Oklahoma to Dallas, then US 77 to Waco.

=== Current routes ===
State Highway 157
- Location: Stephens and Throckmorton counties
- Existed: 1939–1945

On August 21, 1923, SH 6 was extended along the eastern Gulf Division branch of SH 2 to keep SH 2 from having two separate highways with the same number. In 1926, US 75 and US 77 were overlaid on northern SH 6 from Waco northward through the Dallas area to Denison, and US 75 was overlaid on the section from Houston to Galveston. In 1935, US 290 was overlaid on the section from Hempstead to Houston. While the routes were marked concurrently, the concurrent SH 6 kept its numbering until September 26, 1939, when SH 6 was truncated to the Gulf Division routing ending at Waco. It was rerouted south from Hempstead to Galveston, replacing SH 242 and SH 38.

On September 26, 1945, the roadway was extended northwest to Breckenridge over SH 67, continuing northwest to near Throckmorton along SH 157, which was decommissioned. That same day, the section in southeast Texas between Hempstead and Sugar Land was canceled, as it was redundant with the new FM 359. On August 20, 1952, the route was truncated on the north side, ending near Breckenridge. This section was transferred to US 183. On September 26, 1967, SH 6 was rerouted to bypass Bremond, with the old route through Bremond transferred to SH 14 and FM 46. On November 1, 1968, the section between Hempstead and Sugar Land was re-established, as it was routed along US 290 until it reached FM 1960, then replacing FM 1960 southward to where the southern branch of SH 6 intersected to what is now I-69/US 59 in Sugar Land. That portion of FM 1960 from US 290 to then US 90 at Addicks was built in the 1950s, replacing and rerouting some of what was known as Jackrabbit Road. In the early 1970s, the northern section underwent a massive rerouting due to realignments of numerous U.S. and state highways. On August 4, 1971, the section from Breckenridge south to Eastland was redesignated as SH 69. SH 6 was instead rerouted west along US 80 to Cisco, then replaced US 380 northwest to near Old Glory. The route was again extended on July 31, 1975, replacing SH 283 between Old Glory and Stamford northward to the Texas–Oklahoma border, completing the current routing of SH 6. The old route of SH 6 was transferred to new SH 283. On October 27, 1989, a section from US 90A to McKeever Road (McKeever Bypass) was added.

A spur, SH 6A was designated on August 1, 1928, from SH 6 to Texas City. On March 19, 1930, this route was renumbered as SH 146.

In June 2016, a section of the highway in Eastland County between Cisco and Albany was destroyed due to major flooding.

== Route description ==
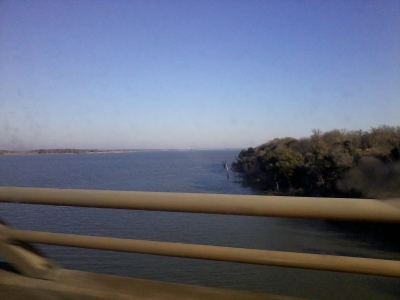
A view from the Highway 6 bridge crossing Lake Waco

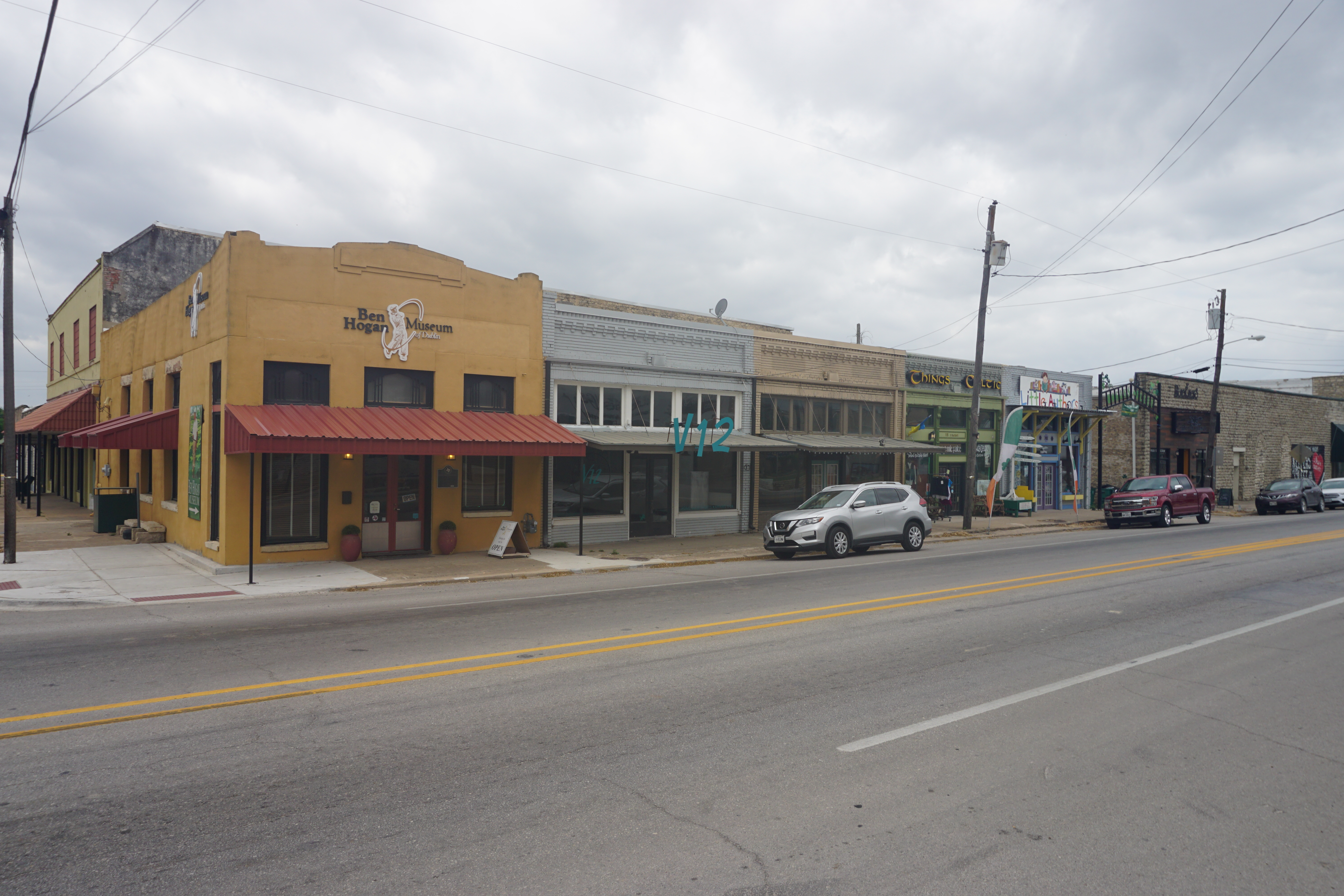
SH 6, as East Blackjack Street, in downtown Dublin

SH 6 begins at an intersection with I-45 and SH 3 in Bayou Vista, and proceeds to the northwest, paralleling the ATSF railroad tracks. The highway makes a mostly straight line through Galveston, Brazoria, and Fort Bend Counties, passing through the city of Alvin. As the highway traverses through Sugar Land, it makes a turn to the north after passing intersections with I-69/US 59 and Alternate US 90. The highway continues north into western Harris County, reaching the Westpark Tollway and I-10. It then intersects US 290 in CyFair, joining it as they travel to the northwest, thus finishing a large routing around the southern and western portions of Houston. The route continues northwest with US 290 as a limited-access highway. At Hockley, the highway veers to the right, forking from an old alignment of the highway, and bypassing the cities of Waller and Hempstead to the north. At Hempstead, it splits from US 290 at a hybrid interchange with direct ramps from westbound US 290/northbound SH 6 to northbound SH 6, and from southbound SH 6 to eastbound US 290/southbound SH 6. SH 6 then turns northward into Grimes County, where it bypasses the city of Navasota, while Business SH 6 passes through town. The highway then turns northwest again, crossing into Brazos County. The highway starts another bypass here, going around the Bryan–College Station area to the northeast, while the business route goes through these cities. On the northeast side of Bryan, the highway meets US 190, and they travel together to the northwest out of the region. SH 6 splits with US 190 in the town of Hearne, but joins US 79 before that route splits to the northeast about a mile north of town. SH 6 then continues northwest, traveling through lesser populated farmlands, before approaching Waco. Before entering Waco, it turns southwest on Loop 340, and bypasses Waco to the south. It reaches an intersection with I-35, and then turns to the northwest again, crossing over Lake Waco. The highway continues northwest and west through more farmland regions in Central Texas, before reaching an intersection with I-20 just south of Eastland. The route briefly turns west, traveling along the former route of US 80, before turning back to the northwest at Cisco. As it continues, it is briefly concurrent with US 180/US 277 in north central Texas. Just northwest of Stamford, the highway makes its final turn to the north at an intersection with SH 283. The highway then travels through sparsely populated areas of Haskell, Knox, Foard, and Hardeman counties before ending north of Quanah at the Red River, where it meets Oklahoma State Highway 6.

== Major intersections ==
All exits are unnumbered.

County	Location	mi	km	Destinations	Notes
Galveston	La Marque	0.0	0.0	I-45 / SH 146 north – Houston, Galveston, Texas City	I-45 exit 7B
Galveston	Hitchcock	4.9	7.9	FM 519 east – La Marque	
Galveston	Hitchcock	5.9	9.5	FM 2004 to I-45 – Lake Jackson, Freeport	
Galveston	Santa Fe	9.2	14.8	FM 646 south – Lake Jackson, Freeport	Southern end of FM 646 concurrency
Galveston	Santa Fe	9.7	15.6	FM 646 north – Dickinson	Northern end of FM 646 concurrency
Galveston	Santa Fe	11.2	18.0	FM 1764 east – Texas City	
Brazoria	Alvin	18.7	30.1	SH 35 – Angleton, Houston	Interchange; SH 35 is planned to be co-signed with SH 99 in the future
Brazoria	Alvin	19.6	31.5	Spur 273 north	
Brazoria	Alvin	19.8	31.9	Bus. SH 35 – Angleton, Houston	
Brazoria	Manvel	27.0	43.5	FM 1128 north – Pearland	
Brazoria	Manvel	29.8	48.0	SH 288 – Angleton, Houston	Interchange
Fort Bend	Arcola	33.9	54.6	FM 521 (McKeever Road) – Houston Southwest Airport	Interchange
Fort Bend	Missouri City	37.0	59.5	Fort Bend Parkway Toll Road	Interchange
Fort Bend	Missouri City	41.6	66.9	FM 1092 north – Stafford	
Fort Bend	Sugar Land	45.7	73.5	I-69 / US 59 – Victoria, Houston	I-69/US 59 exit 109; interchange.
Fort Bend	Sugar Land	46.6	75.0	Brooks Street	Former Spur 58
Fort Bend	Sugar Land	47.0	75.6	University Boulevard	Interchange
Fort Bend	Sugar Land	47.8	76.9	US 90 Alt.	Interchange
Harris	Houston	54.3	87.4	Westpark Tollway / Alief Clodine	Interchange
Harris	Houston	56.3	90.6	FM 1093 (Westheimer Road) – Fulshear, Houston	
Harris	Houston	59.7	96.1	I-10 (US 90) / Grisby Road / Park Row Boulevard	I-10 exit 751
Harris	Houston	66.3	106.7	FM 529 (Spencer Road)	
Harris	Houston	69.1	111.2	Hempstead Highway / Jackrabbit Road	Interchange
Harris	Houston	69.6	112.0	US 290 east / FM 1960 east – Humble, Houston	Southern end of US 290 concurrency; interchange
see US 290
Waller	Hempstead	101.1	162.7	US 290 west / Bus. US 290 east – Brenham, Austin, Hempstead, Bellville	Northern end of US 290 concurrency; hybrid interchange
Waller	Howth	104.6	168.3	FM 1736	
Waller		107.4	172.8	FM 2979 east to FM 362	
Grimes		112.3	180.7	FM 2 – Camp Allen, Luther Unit	Interchange
Grimes		114.1	183.6	FM 1227 west – Wallace Pack Unit	
Grimes		114.8	184.8	FM 2988 east – Whitehall	
Grimes		117.1	188.5	Bus. SH 6 north (LaSalle Street)	Interchange; no northbound entrance
Grimes	Navasota	119.4	192.2	SH 105 east / Spur 515 – Conroe	Interchange
Grimes	Navasota	120.6	194.1	SH 90 / SH 105 west – Anderson, Brenham	Interchange
Grimes	Navasota	122.0	196.3	FM 3090	Interchange
Grimes	Navasota	123.6	198.9	Bus. SH 6 south (LaSalle Street) – Navasota, truck route to SH 105 west	Interchange; southbound exit only and northbound entrance
Brazos		124.4	200.2	FM 2154 – Millican	Interchange; southern end of freeway
Brazos		128.6	207.0	Westward Ho	
Brazos		131.5	211.6	FM 159 – Millican	
Brazos		133.5	214.8	Mesa Verde Drive / Southern Pointe Parkway	
Brazos	College Station	135.6	218.2	Nantucket Drive	Southbound exit and northbound entrance
Brazos	College Station	136.1	219.0	SH 40 (William D. Fitch Parkway)	
Brazos	College Station	137.4	221.1	Barron Road	
Brazos	College Station	138.8	223.4	Rock Prairie Road	Access to College Station Medical Center
Brazos	College Station	139.7	224.8	FM 2818 (Harvey Mitchell Parkway) / Emerald Parkway	
Brazos	College Station	140.0	225.3	Bus. SH 6 north (Texas Avenue) / Deacon Drive – Texas A&M University	
Brazos	College Station	142.0	228.5	Southwest Parkway / Raintree Drive	
Brazos	College Station	142.1	228.7	SH 30 (Harvey Road) – Huntsville	
Brazos	College Station	143.1	230.3	FM 60 (University Drive) – Texas A&M University	
Brazos	Bryan	144.2	232.1	FM 1179 (Briarcrest Drive)	Access to St. Joseph Regional Health Center
Brazos	Bryan	145.7	234.5	FM 158 (William J. Bryan Parkway / Boonville Road)	
Brazos	Bryan	146.5	235.8	Old Reliance Road / MLK Jr. Street	
Brazos	Bryan	147.9	238.0	US 190 east / SH 21 – Madisonville, Caldwell, Airport	Southern end of US 190 concurrency
Brazos	Bryan	149.6	240.8	FM 974 (Tabor Road)	
Brazos	Bryan	150.5	242.2	Woodville Road	
Brazos	Bryan	152.5	245.4	Bus. SH 6 south – Bryan	No northbound exit
Brazos	Bryan	153.0	246.2	FM 2818 (Harvey Mitchell Parkway)	Interchange; northern end of freeway
Brazos–Robertson county line	Benchley	155.3	249.9	SH OSR / Spur 231	Interchange
Robertson		162.6	261.7	FM 2549 north	
Robertson	Hearne	167.9	270.2	US 79 south / US 190 west / FM 391 east – Milano, Wheelock	Northern end of US 190 concurrency; southern end of US 79 concurrency; interchange
Robertson	Hearne	169.5	272.8	FM 485 west – Cameron, Hearne Municipal Airport	
Robertson		169.8	273.3	US 79 north – Franklin, Buffalo, Palestine	Northern end of US 79 concurrency; interchange
Robertson	Calvert	176.5	284.0	FM 1644 south (Texas Street)	Southern end of FM 1644 concurrency
Robertson	Calvert	176.6	284.2	FM 1644 north (Hanna Street)	Northern end of FM 1644 concurrency
Robertson	Calvert	177.0	284.9	FM 979 (Browning Street)	
Robertson		180.2	290.0	FM 2159 north	
Robertson	Bremond	186.7	300.5	SH 14 north – Bremond, Mexia	
Robertson	Bremond	187.0	300.9	FM 2159 east	
Robertson	Bremond	188.6	303.5	FM 1373 – Bremond	
Falls	Bremond	191.0	307.4	FM 46 south – Bremond	
Falls		192.6	310.0	FM 1373 south – Rosebud	
Falls	Reagan	194.7	313.3	FM 413 – Reagan	Interchange; northbound access via Bus. SH 6
Falls	Marlin	201.3	324.0	Bus. SH 6 north – Marlin	Interchange
Falls	Marlin	203.6	327.7	SH 7 – Bruceville-Eddy, Centerville	Interchange
Falls	Marlin	204.9	329.8	FM 147	Interchange
Falls	Marlin	206.0	331.5	Bus. SH 6 south – Marlin	Interchange
Falls		209.3	336.8	FM 2307 east – St. Paul	
Falls	Perry	212.2	341.5	FM 1240 east – Otto	
McLennan	Riesel	216.4	348.3	FM 1860 – Lake Creek, Mart	
McLennan		219.8	353.7	SH 164 – Mart, Groesbeck	Interchange
McLennan		221.8	357.0	FM 3222 east (Hallsburg Road)	
McLennan		223.4	359.5	FM 1860 south	
McLennan	Waco	226.7	364.8	Loop 340 north / Loop 484 north to Bus. US 77 – Waco, Bellmead	Interchange; southern end of Loop 340 concurrency
McLennan		227.9	366.8	Frontage Road	Southbound exit and northbound entrance; interchange
McLennan	Waco	228.2	367.3	FM 434 (3rd Street) / FM 3400 (University Parks Drive)	Interchange
McLennan	Waco	229.6	369.5	12th Street	Interchange
McLennan	Robinson	231.7	372.9	US 77 – Cameron, Waco	Interchange
McLennan	Robinson	232.9	374.8	I-35 – Dallas, Fort Worth, Austin	Southern end of freeway; I-35 exit 330, access to Hillcrest Baptist Medical Center
McLennan	Waco	234.4	377.2	FM 3476 (Bagby Avenue)	No direct northbound exit (signed at I-35)
McLennan	Waco	234.6	377.6	Beverly Drive	No southbound exit
McLennan	Waco	235.4	378.8	FM 3223 (Imperial Drive)	
McLennan	Waco	236.0	379.8	US 84 (Waco Drive) / Spur 298 (Franklin Avenue)	Northern end of Loop 340 concurrency, access to Providence Medical Center
McLennan	Waco	236.4	380.4	Sanger Avenue	Access to Providence Medical Center
McLennan	Waco	237.5	382.2	Loop 396 (Bosque Boulevard)	
McLennan	Waco	238.3	383.5	Lake Waco, Midway Park	
McLennan	Waco	239.7	385.8	Lake Waco, Speegleville Park	
McLennan		241.5	388.7	Speegleville Road	
McLennan		243.2	391.4	Spur 412 (McLaughlin Road)	Interchange; northern end of freeway
McLennan		244.9	394.1	FM 185 – Crawford, China Spring	
Bosque	Valley Mills	256.0	412.0	SH 317 south (Seventh Street) – Crawford, McGregor	
Bosque	Valley Mills	256.2	412.3	FM 56 north (Fourth Street) – Laguna Park	
Bosque		256.8	413.3	FM 217 west – Gatesville	
Bosque		259.2	417.1	FM 854 south	
Bosque		263.6	424.2	FM 2602 south	
Bosque	Clifton	267.5	430.5	FM 219 (5th Street) – Cranfills Gap, Airport	
Bosque	Clifton	268.4	431.9	FM 3220 south	
Bosque		271.3	436.6	FM 2136 west	
Bosque	Meridian	278.5	448.2	SH 22 (West Morgan Street) – Hamilton, Meridian, Glen Rose, Hillsboro, Cleburne	
Bosque	Iredell	291.6	469.3	FM 927 east – Walnut Springs	
Bosque		292.1	470.1	FM 1238 – Cranfills Gap, Iredell	
Hamilton	Hico	301.0	484.4	SH 220 north – Glen Rose	
Hamilton	Hico	301.3	484.9	US 281 south (Walnut Street) – Hamilton	Southern end of US 281 concurrency
Erath		305.8	492.1	US 281 north – Stephenville	Northern end of US 281 concurrency
Erath	Alexander	313.4	504.4	FM 914 – Carlton, Stephenville	
Erath	Dublin	321.6	517.6	FM 847 east (North Norton) – Stephenville	
Erath	Dublin	321.7	517.7	FM 219 south (Liberty) – Carlton, Airport	Southern end of FM 219 concurrency
Erath	Dublin	322.2	518.5	Bus. US 67 / FM 219 north (Patrick Street)	Northern end of FM 219 concurrency
Erath		323.8	521.1	US 67 / US 377 – Comanche, Stephenville	Interchange
Comanche		329.2	529.8	FM 1496 south – Comyn, Proctor	
Comanche	De Leon	334.2	537.8	SH 16 south (Texas Street) – Comanche, Business District	Southern end of SH 16 concurrency
Comanche	De Leon	334.8	538.8	SH 16 north – Desdemona, Strawn	Northern end of SH 16 concurrency
Eastland	Gorman	344.3	554.1	FM 2921 east	
Eastland	Gorman	344.8	554.9	FM 8 east – Desdemona	Southern end of FM 8 concurrency
Eastland	Gorman	345.2	555.5	FM 8 west – Duster	Northern end of FM 8 concurrency
Eastland		349.0	561.7	FM 8 east	
Eastland		354.4	570.4	Loop 389 west	
Eastland	Carbon	355.4	572.0	Loop 389 east / FM 2526 – Carbon	
Eastland	Punkin Center	358.6	577.1	FM 2563 east	
Eastland		362.5	583.4	I-20 – Cisco, Ranger	I-20 exit 340
Eastland	Eastland	364.7	586.9	SH 112 to I-20 – Airport	
Eastland	Eastland	365.5	588.2	FM 3101 north	
Eastland		368.9	593.7	Spur 490 south	
Eastland	Cisco	374.2	602.2	US 183 Truck north (Avenue A)	Southern end of US 183 Truck concurrency
Eastland	Cisco	374.4	602.5	US 183 south / SH 206 south to I-20	Northern end of US 183 Truck concurrency; southern end of US 183 concurrency
Eastland	Cisco	374.6	602.9	US 183 north – Breckenridge	Northern end of US 183 concurrency
Eastland		376.9	606.6	FM 2807 west – Lake Cisco, Airport	
Eastland		382.7	615.9	FM 1853 north	
Callahan		389.9	627.5	FM Spur 880 west to FM 880 – Putnam	
Shackelford	Moran	392.7	632.0	FM 2408 east	
Shackelford	Moran	393.0	632.5	FM 576 – Eolian	
Shackelford	Sedwick	397.6	639.9	FM 2312 south	
Shackelford		406.7	654.5	FM 601 east – Eolian, Ibex	
Shackelford	Albany	408.2	656.9	US 180 east / US 283 north / FM 1084 north – Breckenridge, Throckmorton	Southern end of US 180 / US 283 concurrency
Shackelford	Albany	408.7	657.7	US 283 south – Baird	Northern end of US 283 concurrency
Shackelford		415.8	669.2	SH 351 – Abilene	Interchange
Shackelford		426.7	686.7	US 180 west – Anson	Northern end of US 180 concurrency
Shackelford		429.0	690.4	FM 142 north	
Jones	Lueders	430.2	692.3	FM 1597 west	
Jones		436.9	703.1	FM 600 south – Nugent	Southern end of FM 600 concurrency
Jones	Avoca	437.3	703.8	FM 600 north / FM 1636 west	Northern end of FM 600 concurrency
Jones		440.8	709.4	FM 704 south – Airport	
Jones		442.5	712.1	FM 2702 west – Hamlin, truck route to SH 6 north / US 277	
Jones	Stamford	444.0	714.5	FM 142 east	
Jones	Stamford	445.1	716.3	Bus. US 277 south (McHarg) / FM 1226 south (Swenson) – Anson, Funston	Southern end of US 277 Bus. concurrency; traffic circle around U.S. Post Office
Haskell	Stamford	446.8	719.1	US 277 – Haskell, Anson	Interchange; northern end of US 277 Bus. concurrency; southern end of SH 283 concurrency
Haskell		454.3	731.1	SH 283 west – Aspermont	Northern end of SH 283 concurrency
Haskell		457.9	736.9	FM 1661 south – Sagerton	
Haskell		458.2	737.4	FM 1225 east	
Haskell	Rule	466.2	750.3	US 380 (Fifth Street) – Aspermont, Haskell	
Haskell		469.7	755.9	FM 2407 west	Southern end of FM 2407 concurrency
Haskell		470.0	756.4	FM 2407 east – Haskell	Northern end of FM 2407 concurrency
Haskell	Rochester	473.7	762.3	FM 617 – Weinert	
Haskell	O'Brien	478.2	769.6	FM 2229	
Knox	Knox City	481.3	774.6	SH 222	
Knox		483.3	777.8	FM 1292 west	
Knox		486.2	782.5	FM 2534 east	
Knox	Benjamin	493.4	794.1	US 82 / SH 114 – Guthrie, Seymour	
Knox		504.3	811.6	FM 1756 east – Gilliland	Southern end of FM 1756 concurrency
Knox		505.2	813.0	FM 1756 west – Truscott, Truscott Brine Lake	Northern end of FM 1756 concurrency
Foard				FM 263 west	
Foard				FM 1594 east	
Foard				FM 2003 west	
Foard				FM 98 east	
Foard	Crowell			US 70 – Paducah, Vernon	
Foard				FM 3103 east – Margaret	
Hardeman				PR 62 west – Copper Breaks State Park	
Hardeman				FM 2568 – Airport	
Hardeman	Quanah			FM 104 west – Paducah	
Hardeman	Quanah			US 287 (11th Street) – Childress, Vernon	
Hardeman	Quanah			Spur 133 west (3rd Street)	Southern end of Spur 133 concurrency
Hardeman	Quanah			Spur 133 east (Nelson Street)	Northern end of Spur 133 concurrency
Hardeman	Quanah			FM 2640 east	
Hardeman				FM 2533 east	
Hardeman				FM 1166 south	
Hardeman				SH-6 north – Altus	Oklahoma state line (Red River bridge)
1.000 mi = 1.609 km; 1.000 km = 0.621 mi: Concurrency terminus; Incomplete access

== Business routes ==
SH 6 has four business routes.

=== Marlin business loop ===
Business State Highway 6-N
- Location: Marlin
- Length: 5.328 mi (8.575 km)
- Existed: 1990–present

Business State Highway 6-N (Bus. SH 6-N, formerly Loop 23) is a business loop that runs from SH 6 near Marlin in central Texas. The road was bypassed on November 30, 1978 by SH 6 and designated Loop 23. The road was redesignated as Business SH 6-N on June 21, 1990.

The entire route is in Falls County.

Location	mi	km	Destinations	Notes
	0.0	0.0	SH 6 – Waco, Hearne	Interchange
	1.2	1.9	FM 712 west – Falls On the Brazos Park, William P. Hobby Unit	
Marlin	3.3	5.3	SH 7 (Bridge Street)	
Marlin	3.8	6.1	FM 2117 north (Anders Street)	
Marlin	4.4	7.1	FM 2308 east – Groesbeck	
	5.3	8.5	SH 6	Interchange
1.000 mi = 1.609 km; 1.000 km = 0.621 mi

=== Reagan business loop ===
Business State Highway 6-P
- Location: Reagan
- Length: 0.754 mi (1,213 m)
- Existed: 2015–present

Business State Highway 6-P (Bus. SH 6-P) is a 0.754-mile-long (1.213 km) business loop that runs near Reagan. The road was bypassed on June 25, 2015, by SH 6 when it was rerouted west. Bus. SH 6-P shares a short, one-block concurrency with FM 413 through Reagan. Both ends of the route are only accessible directly from SH 6 northbound. Access to SH 6 southbound can only be reached via an interchange with SH 6 and FM 413.

Major intersections
The entire route is in Reagan, Falls County.

mi	km	Destinations	Notes
0.000	0.000	SH 6 north – Marlin	Western terminus; access to SH 6 north only
0.246	0.396	FM 413 south to SH 6 south / County Road 2903 – Calvert	Western end of FM 413 concurrency; access to SH 6 south via FM 413
0.312	0.502	FM 413 north / County Road 2902 – Kosse	Eastern end of FM 413 concurrency
0.754	1.213	SH 6 north – Marlin	Western terminus; access to SH 6 north only
1.000 mi = 1.609 km; 1.000 km = 0.621 mi: Concurrency terminus; Incomplete access

=== Bryan-College Station business loop ===
Business State Highway 6-R
- Location: Bryan-College Station
- Length: 12.477 mi (20.080 km)
- Existed: 1990–present

Business State Highway 6-R (Bus. SH 6-R, formerly Loop 507) is a business loop that runs through the cities of Bryan and College Station. The highway is known locally as Texas Avenue in both cities and runs along the eastern boundary of Texas A&M University in College Station.

The route was created in 1990 with the re-designation of Loop 507. Loop 507 was designated in 1972 when SH 6 was re-routed along a bypass around Bryan and College Station.

Junction list

The entire route is in Brazos County.

Location	mi	km	Destinations	Notes
College Station	0.0	0.0	SH 6 south	Southern terminus; access to SH 6 south only
College Station	1.1	1.8	FM 2818 (Harvey Mitchell Parkway)	
College Station	2.5	4.0	SH 30 east (Harvey Road)	
College Station	2.9	4.7	FM 2347 west (George Bush Drive) / George Bush Drive East	
College Station	3.8	6.1	FM 60 (University Drive)	
Bryan	5.4	8.7	FM 1179 (Villa Maria Road)	
Bryan	7.9	12.7	FM 158 (William J. Bryan Parkway)	
Bryan	8.9	14.3	SH 21	
Bryan	12.5	20.1	US 190 / SH 6	Interchange; northern terminus
1.000 mi = 1.609 km; 1.000 km = 0.621 mi

=== Navasota business loop ===
Business State Highway 6-S
- Location: Navasota
- Length: 6.316 mi (10.165 km)
- Existed: 1990–present

Business State Highway 6-S (Bus. SH 6-S, formerly Loop 508) is a business loop that runs through Navasota on La Salle Avenue. The route was created in 1972 when SH 6 was rerouted further north and east around town; it is 6.3 miles (10.1 km) long. The road was redesignated as Bus. SH 6-S on June 21, 1990.
