= Hazel Dell, Comanche County, Texas =

Hazel Dell, Texas
- Unincorporated community
- Location within Texas Location within the United States
- Coordinates: 31°52′54″N 98°19′55″W
- Country: United States
- State: Texas
- County: Comanche
- Elevation: 1,135 ft (346 m)
- Time zone: UTC-6 (Central (CST))
  - Summer (DST): UTC-5 (CDT)
- Area code: 325
- GNIS feature ID: 1378432

Hazel Dell, also spelled Hazeldell, is an unincorporated community located in Comanche County, in the U.S. state of Texas.

== Geography ==
Hazel Dell is located at the intersection of Farm to Market Roads 591 and 1702, 17 mi (27 km) southeast of Comanche in southeastern Comanche County.

== Education ==
Hazel Dell had a school from 1873 to the 1940s, whereupon it joined the Gustine Independent School District. The community continues to be served by the Gustine ISD to this day.
