= Vandyke, Texas =

- Unincorporated community
- Location within Texas Location within the United States
- Coordinates: 31°58′21″N 98°33′39″W
- Country: United States
- State: Texas
- County: Comanche
- Elevation: 1,230 ft (370 m)
- Time zone: UTC-6 (Central (CST))
  - Summer (DST): UTC-5 (CDT)
- Area code: 325
- GNIS feature ID: 1379207

Vandyke is an unincorporated community located in Comanche County, in the U.S. state of Texas.

== History ==
The community was named for Van Dyke Frost. A post office was established at Vandyke in 1903 and remained in operation until 1905. The community also had a church in operation. Its population was estimated as 15 in 1933, 30 in 1939, and 20 from 1980 through 2000.

== Geography ==
Vandyke is located on Texas State Highway 16 in north-central Comanche County.

== Education ==
Van Dyke Frost donated land for a school to be built in the early 1870s. Today, the community is served by the Comanche Independent School District.
