= Trial by Self =

- Film Poster for "Trial by Self"
- Directed by: Brandon Allen Powell
- Written by: Brandon Allen Powell
- Produced by: Brandon Allen Powell
- Starring: James Byron Houser; Cat Angle; Amanda Branham
- Cinematography: Brandon Allen Powell
- Edited by: Brandon Allen Powell
- Music by: DJ Pearlman
- Production company: New Dionysus Pictures
- Release date: 2011
- Running time: 70 minutes
- Country: United States
- Language: English
- Budget: <$5,000

Trial by Self is a 2011 American micro-budget independent film written and directed by Brandon Allen Powell.

It is the debut film of Brandon Allen Powell and was written to be as inexpensive to shoot as possible. In addition to writing and directing the film, Powell also produced, shot and edited the film himself.

== Synopsis ==
Tony Fisher, once a loving father and husband, is struggling with depression and increasingly becoming withdrawn from his wife Keri and daughter Sarah. Sarah avoids being at home because of the awkward family situation, while Keri is trying her best to reconnect with Tony. Meanwhile, a series of violent events involving people close to the family unfolds, further affecting them.

== Cast ==
The cast of Trial by Self is made up of mostly unknown actors. Many of the actors had no prior acting experience.

- James Byron Houser as Tony Fisher
- Amanda Branham as Sarah Fisher
- Cat Angle as Keri Fisher
- Robert W. Powell as James Grayson
- Jessica Guess as Jamie Grayson
- Michele Lamelza as Lisa Grayson
- Lauren Doxey as Lindsey Dodson
- Kevin Crank as Detective Jack Preston
- Nicole McKenzie as Detective Gina Garrett
- Jolie Mayfield as Kaitlyn Posey
- Shaiden Justice as Young Sarah

== Production ==
Trial by Self was written, directed, produced, shot, and edited by Brandon Allen Powell. It was shot over a very long period of time in the small town of Gorman, Texas. The production faced many hardships as described in the Langdon Review of the Arts in Texas. In Volume 10 of the annual publication, Powell describes some of the challenges that he had to overcome while making the film and stated that, "A sane person would have simply given up. I made so many compromises that it became clear that the resulting film would not be my original vision."

== Reception ==
As of April 2013, Trial by Self was still making the festival circuit. It has been accepted to a number of film festivals and has been nominated for many awards at the festivals winning one award so far. A few reviews on the film have been published and they are generally positive.
