= Gorman High School =

Coordinates: 32.2087°N 98.6746°W

Location
- 114 W. Lexington; Gorman, Texas 76454; United States

Information
- School type: Public high school
- School district: Gorman Independent School District
- Principal: Karen Robinson
- Staff: 12.34 (FTE)
- Grades: 9-12
- Enrollment: 88 (2023–2024)
- Student to teacher ratio: 7.13
- Colors: Blue & Red
- Athletics conference: UIL Class A
- Mascot: Panthers/Lady Panthers
- Yearbook: Panther Spirit
- Website: Gorman High School

Gorman High School is a public high school located in Gorman, Texas (USA) and classified as a 1A school by the UIL. It is part of the Gorman Independent School District located in southeast Eastland County. In 2015, the school was rated "Met Standard" by the Texas Education Agency.

== Athletics ==
The Gorman Panthers compete in these sports -

Volleyball, 6-man football, Basketball, Track, Baseball & Softball

=== State Titles ===
- Football -
  - 1976(B)

== See also ==
- List of high schools in Texas
