= Wilson, Comanche County, Texas =

- Unincorporated community
- Location within Texas Location within the United States
- Coordinates: 31°55′54″N 98°16′01″W
- Country: United States
- State: Texas
- County: Comanche
- Elevation: 1,234 ft (376 m)
- Time zone: UTC-6 (Central (CST))
  - Summer (DST): UTC-5 (CDT)
- Area code: 325
- GNIS feature ID: 1379282

Wilson is an unincorporated community located in Comanche County, in the U.S. state of Texas.

== Geography ==
Wilson is located in southeastern Comanche County.

== Education ==
Wilson had its own school in 1930, which merged with the school in nearby Carlton in 1947. The building is now used as a community center and church. Today, the community is served by the Dublin Independent School District.
