= Dan Kubiak =

American educator and businessman (1938–1998)

Daniel James Kubiak

Member of the Texas House of Representatives
- In office 1969–1983
- Preceded by: Milton J. Schiller
- Succeeded by: L. B. Kubiak
- Constituency: Districts 27 and 36
- In office 1991 – August 30, 1998
- Preceded by: L. B. Kubiak
- Succeeded by: Charles B. Jones
- Constituency: District 13

Personal details
- Born: March 19, 1938 Reagan, Falls County; Texas, U.S.
- Died: August 30, 1998 (aged 60) Rockdale, Milam County; Texas, U.S.
- Party: Democratic
- Spouse: Divorced from Zana B. Kubiak (1993)
- Children: Kelly Dan Kubiak Alyssa Lea Kubiak Kody Earl Kubiak
- Parent(s): John T. and Connie S. Kubiak
- Education: Blinn College University of Texas at Austin; Midwestern State University Georgetown University
- Occupation: Businessman; Educator

Daniel James Kubiak (March 19, 1938 – August 30, 1998) was an educator and businessman from Rockdale, Texas, who served as a Democratic member of the Texas House of Representatives from 1969 to 1983 and again from 1991 until his death in 1998. During his tenure in the House, he was particularly known for his support of public education.

== Background ==
Kubiak was the oldest of six children born in Reagan in Falls County to a Roman Catholic couple, John T. Kubiak (1914–2001), a farmer, later garage owner, and a native of Robertson County, and the former Connie M. Snider (1915–1999). He attended elementary and junior high school in Reagan but graduated in 1957 from Marlin High School in Marlin. In 1959, he received an Associate of Arts degree from Blinn College in Brenham in Washington County, Texas. Thereafter in 1962, he received a Bachelor of Business Administration from the University of Texas at Austin, which he attended on a football scholarship. In 1968, he procured a Master of Education degree from Midwestern State University in Wichita Falls, Texas. He also pursued graduate studies at Georgetown University in Washington, D.C. He later received a PhD in education from UT-Austin. From 1962 to 1963, he was a mathematics teacher and coach in Vernon, Texas, where he was also a semi-professional football player for the 1962 state champion Vernon Vikings. He then spent five years from 1963 to 1968 at Cypress-Fairbanks High School in Houston. In 1967, he received "Teacher of the Year" designation from both Cypress-Fairbanks High School and the Texas State Teachers Association.

== Legislative years ==
Initially, Kubiak was elected to the legislature in 1968 from District 27, when he unseated an incumbent Democrat in the primary election. That district included Milam, Robertson, and his native Falls counties. He was elected the year that U.S. President Lyndon B. Johnson of Texas declined to seek a second full term in office. There is a photograph on Kubiak's memorial page of a youthful Kubiak speaking with Johnson, probably in the late 1960s. Kubiak was reelected to the state House in 1970, a heavily Democratic year in which Lloyd M. Bentsen, Jr., won the U.S. Senate race in Texas against future President George Herbert Walker Bush. In 1972, after redistricting, Kubiak defeated an incumbent Democrat in District 36, which included Waller, Washington, Milam, and Robertson counties. He was also reelected in District 36 in 1974, 1976, 1978, and 1980.

After his seventh term in the state House, Kubiak lost a Democratic primary race for Texas land commissioner to Garry Mauro of Bryan, a confidant of later U.S. President Bill Clinton. Kubiak's House seat was in turn won by his brother, L. B. Kubiak, a veterinarian. In 1983, Dan Kubiak failed to unseat Republican convert Phil Gramm for U.S. representative in the Bryan-College Station district. A former Democrat, Gramm switched parties to support the administration of President Ronald W. Reagan. Gramm resigned his House seat but retained the post in a special election in which Kubiak was one of Gramm's challengers. In 1984, Kubiak won the Democratic nomination for Congress over State Senator Hugh Parmer of Fort Worth but lost the general election to the still serving Republican, Joe Barton, who succeeded Gramm in the House upon Gramm's election to the U.S. Senate seat vacated by John G. Tower. During the 1980s, Kubiak devoted much of his energy to real estate, farming, and construction projects.

In 1990, L. B. Kubiak did not seek reelection, and Dan Kubiak was instead elected to the state House from District 13, which then included Milam, Robertson, Washington and Waller counties. He was reelected in 1992, 1994 and 1996. In 1992, District 13 was significantly redrawn to include Austin, Brazos, Burleson, and Lee counties as well as the continuing Milam and Washington counties. In 1992, as a Bill Clinton supporter, Kubiak won narrowly, 52 to 48 percent over the Brenham Republican Robert Mikeska, who fared particularly well in Washington and Austin counties in the southern end of the district. Thereafter, Kubiak devoted greater time and attention to those counties and won them both in 1996 over the Republican James Hartley. However, the margin in Austin County was a mere thirty-one votes.

== Death and legacy ==
Kubiak died in 1998 of cardiovascular disease at the age of 60 at his home in Rockdale, while he was again campaigning for reelection. Oddly, his intraparty rival for land commissioner from 1982, Garry Mauro, headed the Democratic ticket that year in a failed effort to deny a second term to Republican Governor George W. Bush. L. B. Kubiak sought the nomination to succeed his brother, but the party chairmen in the district unanimously turned to Teddy Boehm of Brenham, the wife of a retired physician, Henry Boehm, who had served as chairman of the Blinn College trustees. L. B. Kubiak refused to support Mrs. Boehm and instead endorsed the Republican nominee, Charles B. Jones of College Station, who claimed the seat for the first time in the 20th century for the GOP. According to the Austin American-Statesman, Mrs. Boehm questioned L. B. Kubiak's endorsement: "I do wonder if Mr. Jones is such a supporter of Mr. [Dan] Kubiak's principles, why was he running against him?"

On learning of Kubiak's death, Speaker Pete Laney of Hale Center, said that he was "shocked and saddened by the sudden death of our friend and colleague. We have lost a good friend and the people of Texas have lost an outstanding legislator who worked tirelessly on behalf of his constituents to improve public education and to ensure that state tax dollars were spent wisely and efficiently." State Senator Carlos Truan, a Corpus Christi Democrat and the dean of the Senate, described Kubiak as "a very, very dedicated legislator, particularly in the field of education."

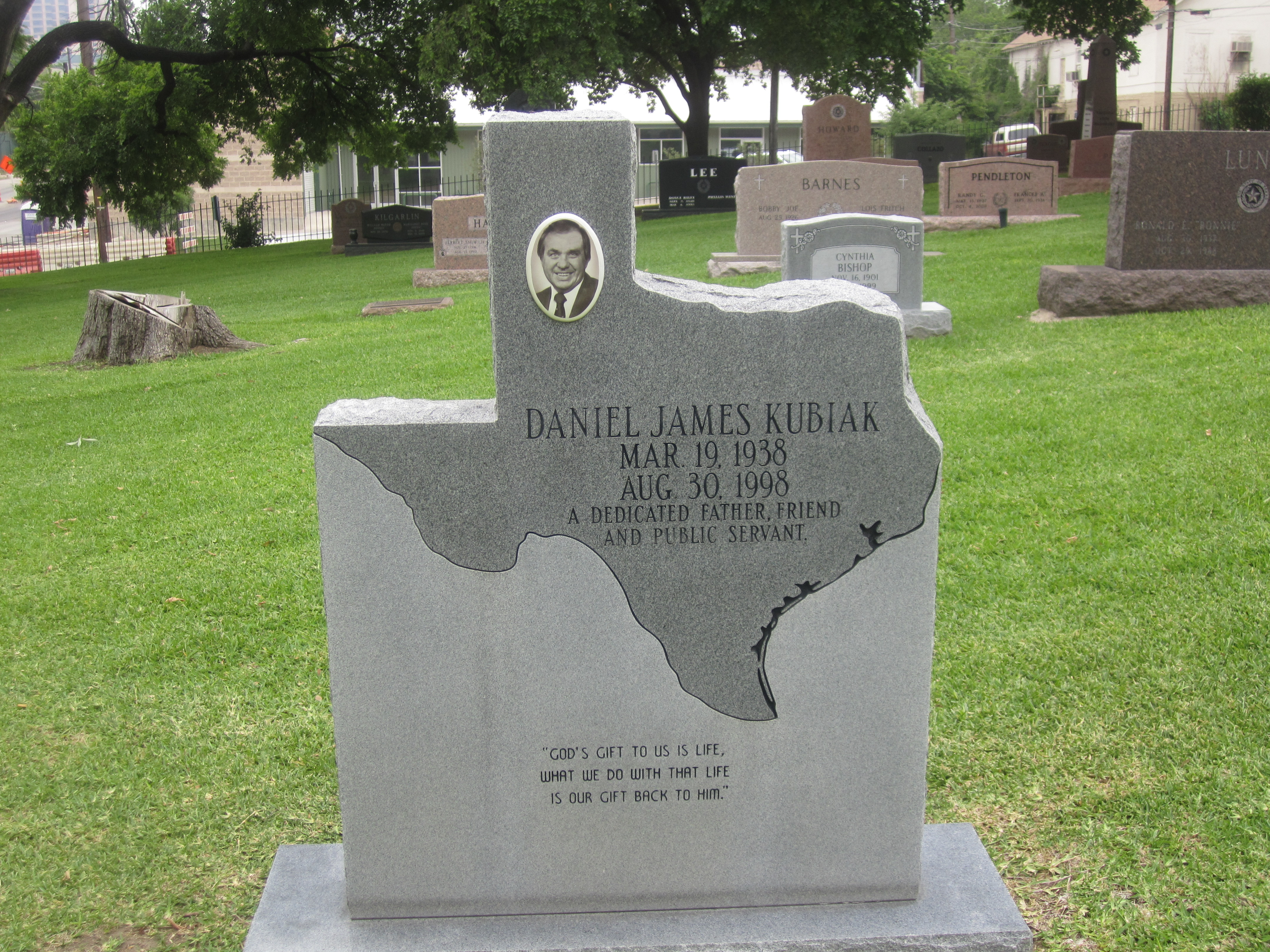
Kubiak monument at Texas State Cemetery in Austin, Texas

=== Books ===
In 1967, while he was still in the field of professional education, Kubiak published Ten Tall Texans, biographical sketches designed for juveniles and young adults taken from the period in Texas history from 1821 to 1845. Among those featured in the book are Sam Houston, Lorenzo de Zavala, Stephen F. Austin, Jose Antonio Navarro, Ben Milam, Andrea Candelaria (a nurse who survived the siege of The Alamo), Davy Crockett, Jim Bowie, Juan Seguin, and William B. Travis. An exhibit entitled Ten Tall Texans was established in 2008 at the Brenham Heritage Museum. It was loaned during 2009 to the Rockdale Depot Museum. In 1984, Kubiak's book was republished by Eakin Publishers under the title Titans of Texas .

In 1972, he published a second book, A Monument to a Black Man: The Biography of William Goyens, a study of the African American who served as an aide to Sam Houston and was a negotiator for Indian treaties.

=== Death ===
A divorced father of three children, Kubiak died on August 30, 1998, and is interred at the Texas State Cemetery in Austin, as is the prerogative of all state lawmakers. His epitaph reads: "God's gift to us is life. What we do with that life is our gift back to Him."

Preceded by Milton J. Schiller	State Representative from Rockdale, Texas (Districts 27 and then 36); 1969–1983	Succeeded by L. B. Kubiak
Preceded by L. B. Kubiak	State Representative from Rockdale, Texas (District 13); 1991–1998	Succeeded by Charles B. Jones
