= Gustin (disambiguation) =

Grant Gustin (born 1990) is an American actor.

Gustin may also refer to:

- Carbonic anhydrase 6, a saliva enzyme that is also called gustin
- Jon Gustin (1932–1994), American golfer
- Gustin House, an historic building in Saskatoon, Saskatchewan, Canada
- Gustin Township, Michigan
  - Gustin, Michigan, an unincorporated community

== See also ==
- Gustine (disambiguation)
- Guston (disambiguation)
