= Downing, Texas =

- Unincorporated community
- Location within Texas Location within the United States
- Coordinates: 32°01′27″N 98°33′02″W
- Country: United States
- State: Texas
- County: Comanche
- Elevation: 1,283 ft (391 m)
- Time zone: UTC-6 (Central (CST))
  - Summer (DST): UTC-5 (CDT)
- Area code: 325
- GNIS feature ID: 1378224

Downing is an unincorporated community located in Comanche County, in the U.S. state of Texas. According to the Handbook of Texas, the community had a population of 30 in 2000.

== History ==
On April 26, 1994, an F0 tornado struck Downing, but there was no damage done.

== Geography ==
Downing is located on Texas State Highway 16, 10 mi (16 km) northeast of Comanche and 6 mi (9.7 km) south of De Leon in northern Comanche County.
