= Proctor, Texas =

Unincorporated community in Texas, US

Coordinates: 31°59′12″N 98°25′50″W

Proctor is an unincorporated community and census-designated place (CDP) in Comanche County, Texas, United States. As of the 2020 census, Proctor had a population of 93.

The community is situated along U.S. Highway 377 in eastern Comanche County, approximately twelve miles northeast of Comanche.

Thomas O. Moore established the community in 1872. The settlement was moved to its present site in the early 1890s to be on the route of the Fort Worth and Rio Grande Railroad. Briefly known as Camden, the name was soon changed to Proctor. During the early 20th century, Proctor flourished, but began to decline by the 1930s.

Although Proctor is unincorporated, it has a post office, with the ZIP code 76468. Public education in the community is provided by the Comanche Independent School District.

== Climate ==
The climate in this area is characterized by relatively high temperatures and evenly distributed precipitation throughout the year. The Köppen Climate System describes the weather as humid subtropical, and uses the abbreviation Cfa.

== Demographics ==
Historical population
Census	Pop.	Note	%±
2020	93		—
U.S. Decennial Census; 1850–1900 1910; 1920 1930 1940; 1950 1960 1970; 1980 1990 2000; 2010 2020

Proctor first appeared as a census designated place in the 2020 U.S. census.

=== 2020 census ===
Proctor CDP, Texas – Racial and ethnic composition Note: the US Census treats Hispanic/Latino as an ethnic category. This table excludes Latinos from the racial categories and assigns them to a separate category. Hispanics/Latinos may be of any race.
Race / Ethnicity (NH = Non-Hispanic)	Pop 2020	% 2020
White alone (NH)	67	72.04%
Black or African American alone (NH)	0	0.00%
Native American or Alaska Native alone (NH)	0	0.00%
Asian alone (NH)	1	1.08%
Native Hawaiian or Pacific Islander alone (NH)	0	0.00%
Other race alone (NH)	0	0.00%
Mixed race or Multiracial (NH)	3	3.23%
Hispanic or Latino (any race)	22	23.66%
Total	93	100.00%
