= Guston =

Guston may refer to:

== Places ==
- Guston, Colorado, ghost town in Ouray County
- Guston, Kent, a village in Kent, England
- Guston, Kentucky, an unincorporated community in Meade County

== People ==
- Philip Guston (1913–1980), Canadian American artist of Ukrainian descent

== See also ==
- Gustin (disambiguation)
