= St. Louis and San Francisco Railway Depot (Comanche, Texas) =

- St. Louis and San Francisco Railway Depot (Frisco Depot)
- U.S. National Register of Historic Places
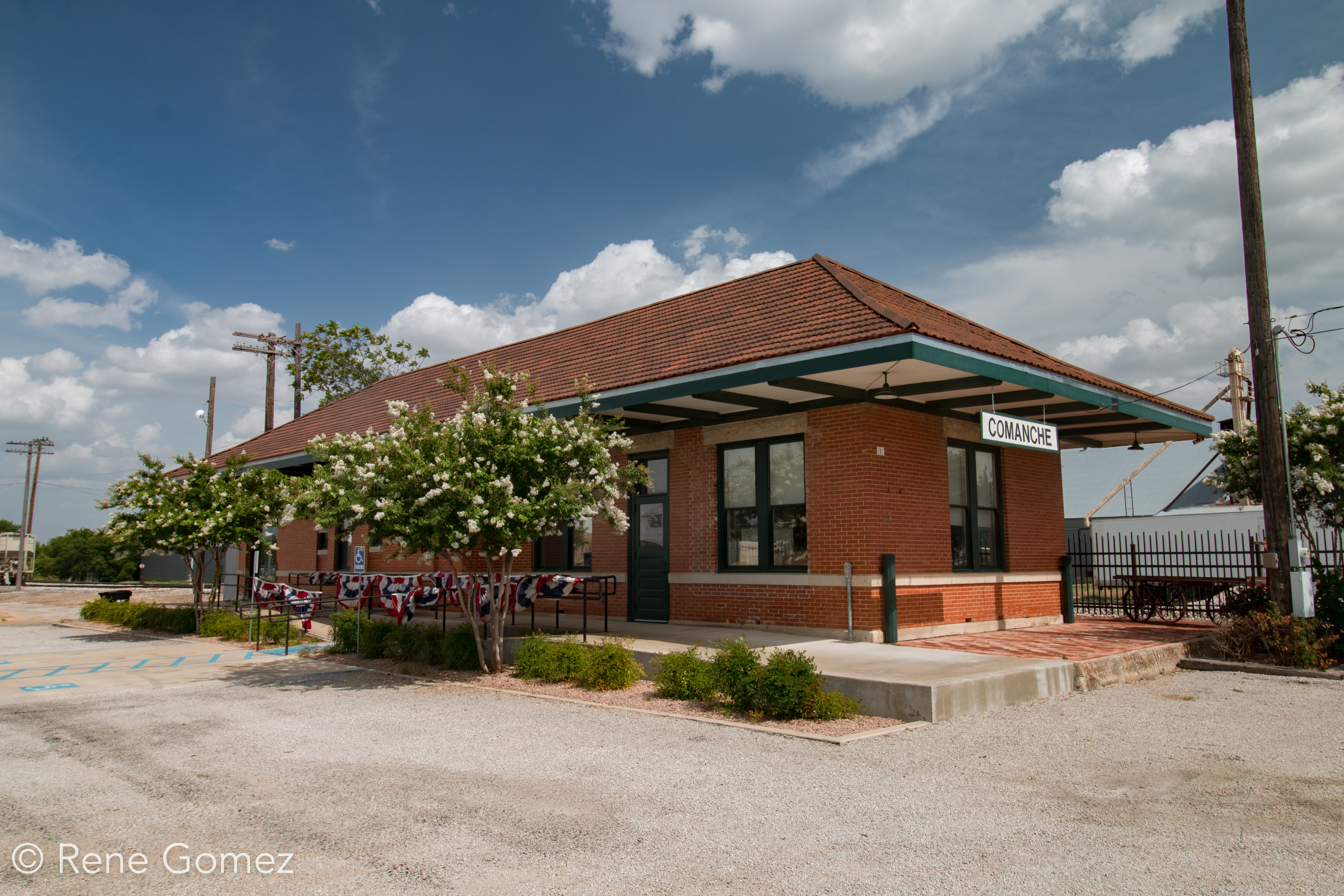

- Location within Texas Location within the United States
- Location: 304 S. Austin St., Comanche, Texas
- Coordinates: 31°53′42″N 98°36′12″W
- Area: .44 acres (0.18 ha)
- Built by: St. Louis and San Francisco Railway
- NRHP reference No.: 100001872
- Added to NRHP: December 4, 2017

The St. Louis and San Francisco Railway Depot in Comanche, Texas, also known as the Frisco Depot and as the Comanche Depot, was listed on the National Register of Historic Places in 2017.

It was built in 1909 as a depot of the St. Louis and San Francisco Railway.

It was restored in 2011.
