= Reagan, Texas =

- Unincorporated community
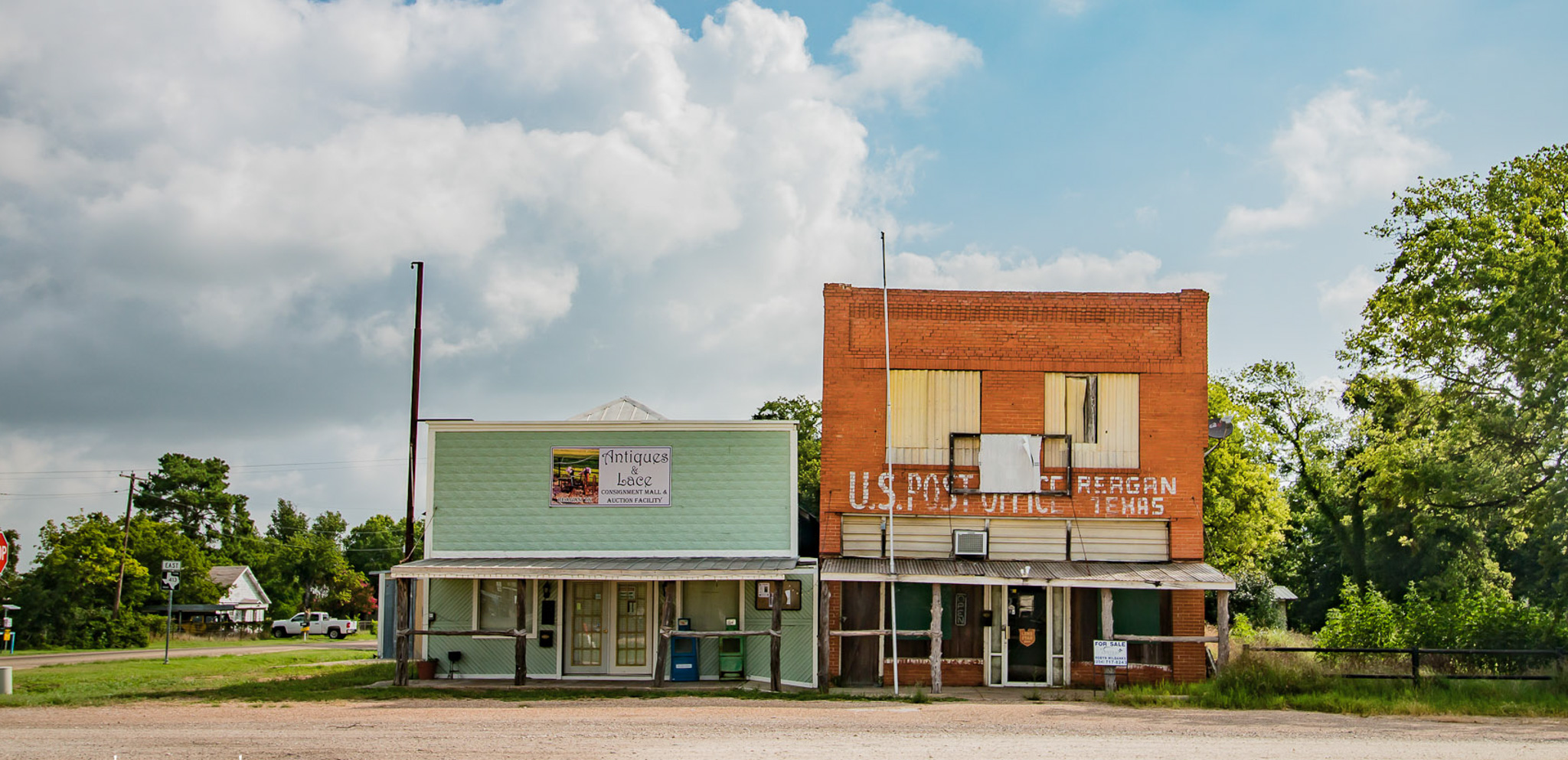
- Post office in Reagan

- Location within Texas Location within the United States
- Coordinates: 31°13′06″N 96°46′57″W
- Country: United States of America
- State: Texas
- County: Falls
- Established: 1873
- Elevation: 381 ft (116 m)
- Time zone: UTC-6 (Central (CST))
  - Summer (DST): UTC-5 (CDT)
- ZIP code: 76680
- Area code: 254
- GNIS feature ID: 1366081

Reagan is an unincorporated community in Falls County, Texas, United States. It lies at the intersection of State Highway 6 and Farm-to-Market Road 413, nine miles (14 km) southeast of Marlin.

State Representative Dan Kubiak was born in Reagan in 1938. Kubiak's younger brother, L.B. Kubiak, from 1983 to 1991 held the same House seat.

== History ==
Reagan was established in 1873, shortly after the Waco and Northwestern Railroad completed the section of track between Bremond and Ross. A post office opened that year, as well, and was named for William Reason Reagan who donated the land for the townsite.

Transitioning from a rail stop to agriculture during the 20th century Reagan saw most of its businesses move to the nearby county seat of Marlin. Current residents commute to nearby cities where they are employed in non-agricultural professions. Farming and ranching are still practiced but the majority of income is derived from other sources.

The population grew to 500 by the 1890s, and reached a high of 600 in 1914. Despite the small population and being an unincorporated community, Reagan is the home to the Texas Pneumatic Tools Company.
