= Comanche High School =

Location
- 1600 North Austin Street; Comanche, Texas 76442-9999; United States; 31.9125°N 98.5934°W

Information
- School type: Public high school
- School district: Comanche Independent School District
- Principal: Joni Patterson
- Teaching staff: 36.90 (FTE)
- Grades: 9-12
- Enrollment: 372 (2023-2024)
- Student to teacher ratio: 10.08
- Colors: Black & Gold
- Athletics conference: UIL Class 3A
- Mascot: Indian/Maiden
- Yearbook: Arrowhead
- Website: www.comancheisd.net/page/chs.home

Comanche High School is a public high school located in Comanche, Texas, United States and is classified as a 3A school by the UIL. It is part of the Comanche Independent School District located in central Comanche County. In 2015, the school was rated "Met Standard" by the Texas Education Agency.

== Athletics ==
The Comanche Indians and/or Maidens compete in the following sports:

- Baseball
- Basketball
- Cross Country
- Football
- Golf
- Powerlifting
- Softball
- Tennis
- Track & Field
- Volleyball

=== State titles ===
- Girls Basketball -
  - 1951(1A), 1998(3A)

==== State finalist ====
- Girls Basketball -
  - 1973(2A)

== School activities ==
Comanche supports many different school activities, including;

- Marching Band
- Guitar
- Drama Club
- Science Olympiad
- DECA
- FCCLA
- Theater
- One Act Play
- FFA
- Annual Staff
- Student Chamber
- National Honor Society
- Student Cabinet
- Small Schools
- Student Council
- FHLA
- Auto Skills USA
- Student Chamber
- Junior Bank Board
- FCS

== Notable alumni ==
- Jeffrey Abbey, professional dirt track and stock car racing driver
