= Comanche County–City Airport =

- IATA: none; ICAO: KMKN; FAA LID: MKN

Summary
- Airport type: Public
- Owner: City of Comanche / Comanche County
- Serves: Comanche, Texas
- Elevation AMSL: 1,387 ft (423 m)
- Coordinates: 31°55′13″N 098°35′57″W

Map
- Location within Texas

Runways
Direction	Length		Surface
Direction	ft	m	Surface
17/35	4,497	1,371	Asphalt

Statistics (2021)
- Aircraft operations (year ending 5/21/2021): 9,200
- Based aircraft: 14
- Source: Federal Aviation Administration

Comanche County–City Airport (ICAO: KMKN, FAA LID: MKN) is a public use airport located two nautical miles (2.3 mi, 3.7 km) northeast of the central business district of Comanche, a city in Comanche County, Texas, United States. It is owned by the City of Comanche and Comanche County. The airport is included in the FAA's National Plan of Integrated Airport Systems for 2011–2015, which categorized it as a general aviation facility.

Although many U.S. airports use the same three-letter location identifier for the FAA and IATA, this facility is assigned MKN by the FAA but has no designation from the IATA (which assigned MKN to Malekolon, Papua New Guinea).

== Facilities and aircraft ==
Comanche County–City Airport covers an area of 85 acres (34 ha) at an elevation of 1,387 feet (423 m) above mean sea level. It has one runway designated 17/35 with an asphalt surface measuring 4,497 by 75 feet (1,371 x 23 m).

For the 12-month period ending May 21, 2021, the airport had 9,200 general aviation aircraft operations, an average of 25 per day. At that time there were 14 aircraft based at this airport: 13 single-engine, and 1 multi-engine.

== Economic impact ==
Hunting leases "are a big part of area commerce", and the airport provides a gateway for hunting parties to access the region. Between 2006 and 2010, expenditures for airport improvements and infrastructure created two job-years of employment, and generated $160,423 in economic activity.

== See also ==
- List of airports in Texas
