= Gorman Independent School District =

School district in Texas

Gorman Independent School District is a public school district based in Gorman, Texas (USA).

The district is located in Eastland County and a small portion of the district extends into Comanche County. Gorman ISD has two campuses - Gorman High (Grades 7-12) and Maxfield Elementary (Grades PK-6).

In 2009, the school district was rated "academically acceptable" by the Texas Education Agency.

The district changed to a four day school week in fall 2022.
