= Gustine Airport =

- IATA: none; ICAO: none; FAA LID: 3O1

Summary
- Airport type: Public
- Owner: City of Gustine
- Location: Gustine, California
- Elevation AMSL: 79 ft (24 m)
- Coordinates: 37°15′46″N 120°57′48″W

Map
- Location of airport in California

Runways
Direction	Length		Surface
Direction	ft	m	Surface
18/36	3,207	977	Asphalt

Statistics (2011)
- Aircraft operations: 8000
- Based aircraft: 19
- Source: Federal Aviation Administration

Gustine Airport (FAA LID: 3O1) is a public airport located two miles (3.2 km) east of Gustine, serving Merced County, California, United States. It is mostly used for general aviation.

== Facilities and aircraft ==
Gustine Airport covers an area of 45 acres (18 ha) which contains one asphalt paved runway (18/36) measuring 3,207 x 60 ft (977 x 18 m).

For the 12-month period ending May 18, 2011, the airport had 8,000 aircraft operations, an average of 22 per day: 100% general aviation, 0% air taxi, 0% scheduled commercial, and 0% military. There are 19 aircraft based at this airport: 16 single engine, one multi-engine, two ultralights, and no jet aircraft.
