= Lannius, Texas =

Unincorporated community in Texas, US

Lannius
- Unincorporated community
- Location in Texas
- Coordinates: 33.60815960°N 96.05608490°W
- Country: United States
- State: Texas
- County: Fannin

Population (2000)
  - Total: 79

Lannius, formerly Stephensville, is an unincorporated community in Fannin County, Texas, United States.

== History ==
Lannius was first settled by William Onstott, Richard Overton, Ira Isham, and W. W. Bowman in 1836, naming it Stephensville. After receiving a post office in 1891, they changed their name to Lannius, after landowner William Lannius, due to Stephenville, Texas already existing. The post office closed in 1907. As of 2000, Lannius has an estimated population of 79.

== 2024 solar eclipse ==
Lannius was one of the Texas areas listed for viewing the solar eclipse of April 8, 2024.
