= Comanche County, Texas =

County in Texas, United States

- County
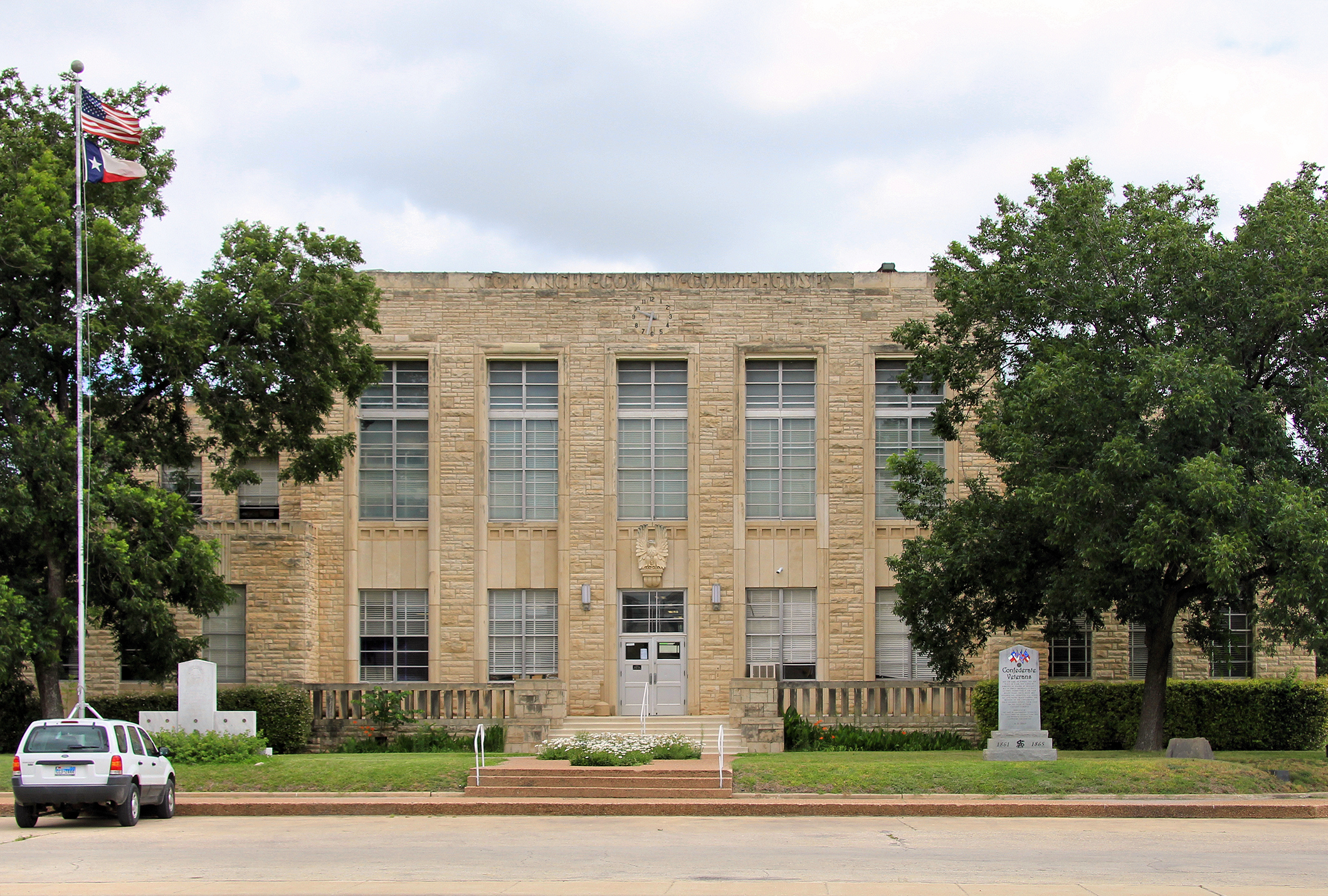
- The Comanche County Courthouse in Comanche

- Location within the U.S. state of Texas
- Coordinates: 31°57′N 98°34′W
- Country: United States
- State: Texas
- Founded: 1856
- Named for: Comanche tribe
- Seat: Comanche
- Largest city: Comanche

Area
  - Total: 948 sq mi (2,460 km^{2})
  - Land: 938 sq mi (2,430 km^{2})
  - Water: 9.9 sq mi (26 km^{2}) 1.0%

Population (2020)
  - Total: 13,594
  - Estimate (2025): 14,432 ▲
  - Density: 14.5/sq mi (5.60/km^{2})
- Time zone: UTC−6 (Central)
  - Summer (DST): UTC−5 (CDT)
- Congressional district: 25th
- Website: www.comanchecountytx.gov

Comanche County is a county located on the Edwards Plateau in Central Texas. As of the 2020 census, its population was 13,594. The county seat is Comanche. The county was founded in 1856 and is named for the Comanche Native American tribe.

== History ==
Among the first inhabitants of present-day Comanche County were the Comanche Indian tribe.

In 1854, Jesse M. Mercer and others organized a colony near the future settlement of Newburg. in Comanche County on lands earlier granted by Mexico to Stephen F. Austin and Samuel May Williams. Frank M. Collier built the first log house in the county.

In 1856, the Texas legislature formed Comanche County from Coryell and Bosque counties. Cora community, named after Cora Beeman of Bell County, was designated as the county seat. Comanche became the county seat in 1859. As of 1860, the county population was 709 persons, including 61 slaves.

The Comanche Chief began publication in 1873. Editor Joe Hill's brother, Robert T. Hill, worked on the newspaper while developing his esteemed career as a geologist.

In 1874, John Wesley Hardin and his gang celebrated his 21st birthday in Brown and Comanche counties. Deputy Charles Webb drew his gun, provoking a gunfight that ended Webb's life. A lynch mob was formed, but Hardin and his family were put into protective custody. The mob broke into the jail and hanged his brother Joe and two cousins. Hardin fled. He was arrested in 1877 by Texas Rangers and a local authority on a train in Pensacola, Florida, while traveling under the alias James W. Swain. He was tried in Comanche for the murder of Deputy Sheriff Charles Webb, and sentenced to 25 years in Huntsville Prison.

Known for its fertile soil, Comanche County was a hotbed of political populism in the latter years of the 19th century.

=== Expulsion of the African Americans ===
In 1886, "one of those too horribly frequent crimes was committed by an African American. He was quickly caught and was punished in accordance with the rules of the unwritten law." Following this lynching, at a meeting of the white citizens "it was resolved to give every negro in the county one week's notice to leave the county, and committees of men from different sections of the county were appointed to carry out the will of the white people."

Notices have been posted in various towns of Comanche County, Texas, warning all "niggers" to leave under penalty of death, and it is fairly declared by the whites that no colored people will be allowed to live in that section.

In my days over the public well in the little railroad station [of De Leon, Texas], 16 miles from Comanche, there was a villainously painted sign, which read as follows: "Niggers! Let not the sun set on you in Comanche County."

Comanche County was a sundown town, and in 1886 the communities of Bibb, De Leon, Fleming, Sipe Springs, and Whittville had signage reading, "No negroes allowed in this town." According to a 1953 study, the county took pride in and publicized its all-white population.

Black porters on the train would hide in the baggage car as trains passed through Comanche County. Because of the threats to its porters, the railroad asked that the sign be removed, and the town of De Leon moved it to the town well, "in the middle of Texas Avenue". No report gives the date of the sign's removal.

=== Arrival of the railroad ===
The Texas Central Railroad began service in Comanche County in 1885 and began carrying cattle and cotton to market. By 1890, cotton had become king in the county, but by the start of the 20th century, the boll weevil had devastated the county cotton industry for three decades. In 1907, farmers in the county began to experiment with peanut farming.

Oil was discovered at Desdemona in 1910. The peak year for the Comanche County oil boom was 1920.

In 1951–1952, a desperate, drought-stricken county experimented with rain making. Proctor Lake was impounded in 1963 to provide flood control and drinking water.

From 1968 to 1974, Comanche County native Jim Reese served as the mayor of Odessa, Texas. He launched unsuccessful congressional campaigns in the 1976 general election against the Democrat George H. Mahon and in the 1978 Republican primary against George W. Bush. During the 1970s, the oil industrialist Bill Noël of Odessa purchased orchards in Comanche County.

As of 1982, Comanche produced more than 45,546,000 pounds (20,659,000 kg) of peanuts, ranking second in Texas.

== Geography ==
According to the U.S. Census Bureau, the county has a total area of 948 square miles (2,460 km^{2}), of which 9.9 square miles (26 km^{2}) (1.0%) are covered by water. The county is located some 60 miles north of the geographic center of Texas.

The county is home to Proctor Lake.

=== Adjacent counties ===
- Erath County (northeast)
- Hamilton County (southeast)
- Mills County (south)
- Brown County (southwest)
- Eastland County (northwest)

== Demographics ==
Historical population
Census	Pop.	Note	%±
1860	709		—
1870	1,001		41.2%
1880	8,608		759.9%
1890	15,608		81.3%
1900	23,009		47.4%
1910	27,186		18.2%
1920	25,748		−5.3%
1930	18,430		−28.4%
1940	19,245		4.4%
1950	15,516		−19.4%
1960	11,865		−23.5%
1970	11,898		0.3%
1980	12,617		6.0%
1990	13,381		6.1%
2000	14,026		4.8%
2010	13,974		−0.4%
2020	13,594		−2.7%
2025 (est.)	14,432	▲	6.2%
U.S. Decennial Census; 1850–2010 2010 2020

=== Racial and ethnic composition ===
Comanche County, Texas – Racial and ethnic composition Note: the US Census treats Hispanic/Latino as an ethnic category. This table excludes Latinos from the racial categories and assigns them to a separate category. Hispanics/Latinos may be of any race.
Race / Ethnicity (NH = Non-Hispanic)	Pop 1980	Pop 1990	Pop 2000	Pop 2010	Pop 2020	% 1980	% 1990	% 2000	% 2010	% 2020
White alone (NH)	11,220	11,109	10,846	10,145	9,197	88.93%	83.02%	77.33%	72.60%	67.65%
Black or African American alone (NH)	3	10	62	25	39	0.02%	0.07%	0.44%	0.18%	0.29%
Native American or Alaska Native alone (NH)	18	33	52	47	49	0.14%	0.25%	0.37%	0.34%	0.36%
Asian alone (NH)	11	8	17	34	38	0.09%	0.06%	0.12%	0.24%	0.28%
Native Hawaiian or Pacific Islander alone (NH)	x	x	1	4	3	x	x	0.01%	0.03%	0.02%
Other race alone (NH)	22	16	3	8	24	0.17%	0.12%	0.02%	0.06%	0.18%
Mixed race or Multiracial (NH)	x	x	117	106	377	x	x	0.83%	0.76%	2.77%
Hispanic or Latino (any race)	1,343	2,205	2,928	3,605	3,867	10.64%	16.48%	20.88%	25.80%	28.45%
Total	12,617	13,381	14,026	13,974	13,594	100.00%	100.00%	100.00%	100.00%	100.00%

=== 2020 census ===
As of the 2020 census, the county had a population of 13,594. The median age was 45.9 years. 22.3% of residents were under the age of 18 and 24.3% of residents were 65 years of age or older. For every 100 females there were 100.0 males, and for every 100 females age 18 and over there were 97.2 males age 18 and over.

The racial makeup of the county was 75.7% White, 0.4% Black or African American, 0.9% American Indian and Alaska Native, 0.3% Asian, <0.1% Native Hawaiian and Pacific Islander, 10.5% from some other race, and 12.3% from two or more races. Hispanic or Latino residents of any race comprised 28.4% of the population.

<0.1% of residents lived in urban areas, while 100.0% lived in rural areas.

There were 5,529 households in the county, of which 27.7% had children under the age of 18 living in them. Of all households, 51.7% were married-couple households, 19.5% were households with a male householder and no spouse or partner present, and 24.1% were households with a female householder and no spouse or partner present. About 28.6% of all households were made up of individuals and 16.3% had someone living alone who was 65 years of age or older.

There were 6,912 housing units, of which 20.0% were vacant. Among occupied housing units, 76.9% were owner-occupied and 23.1% were renter-occupied. The homeowner vacancy rate was 2.6% and the rental vacancy rate was 11.6%.

=== 2000 census ===
As of the 2000 census, 14,026 people, 5,522 households, and 3,926 families were residing in the county. The population density was 15 people per square mile (5.8 people/km^{2}). The 7,105 housing units had an average density of 8 per square mile (3.1/km^{2}). The racial makeup of the county was 87.30% White, 0.44% African American, 0.61% Native American, 0.13% Asian, 9.71% from other races, and 1.82% from two or more races. About 21% of the population were Hispanics or Latinos of any race.

Of the 5,522 households, 29.8% had children under 18 living with them, 59.2% were married couples living together, 8.1% had a female householder with no husband present, and 28.9% were not families. About 26% of all households were made up of individuals, and 15.2% had someone living alone who was 65 or older. The average household size was 2.48, and the average family size was 2.98.

In the county, the age distribution was 25.3% under 18, 7.1% from 18 to 24, 23.3% from 25 to 44, 24.0% from 45 to 64, and 20.3% who were 65 or older. The median age was 40 years. For every 100 females, there were 95.8 males. For every 100 females 18 and over, there were 94.4 males.

The median income for a household in the county was $28,422, and for a family was $34,810. Males had a median income of $26,094 versus $18,912 for females. The per capita income for the county was $14,677. About 14% of families and 17.30% of the population were below the poverty line, including 22.6% of those under 18 and 16.0% of those 65 or over.

== Transportation ==
=== Major highways ===
- U.S. Highway 67/U.S. Highway 377
- State Highway 6
- State Highway 16
- State Highway 36
- Loop 130

=== Airport ===
The Comanche County-City Airport is located 2.0 nautical miles (2.3 mi; 3.7 km) northeast of the City of Comanche's central business district.

== Media ==
Comanche County is currently listed as part of the Dallas-Fort Worth DMA. Local media outlets include KDFW-TV, KXAS-TV, WFAA-TV, KTVT-TV, KERA-TV, KTXA-TV, KDFI-TV, KDAF-TV, and KFWD-TV. Other nearby stations that provide coverage for Comanche County include KCEN-TV, KWTX-TV, and KAKW-DT from the Waco/Temple/Killeen DMA, and KTXS-TV, KTAB-TV, and KRBC-TV from the Abilene/Sweetwater/Brownwood DMA.

Two local newspapers serve Comanche County: the Comanche Chief and the De Leon Free Press.

== Communities ==
=== Cities ===
- Comanche (county seat)
- De Leon

=== Town ===
- Gustine

=== Census-designated places ===
- Lamkin
- Proctor

=== Other unincorporated communities ===
- Amity
- Beattie
- Comyn
- Downing
- Duster
- Energy
- Hasse
- Hazel Dell
- Newburg
- Rucker
- Sidney
- Sipe Springs
- Vandyke
- Wilson

=== Ghost towns ===
- Cora
- Mercer's Gap
- Watson

== Politics ==
United States presidential election results for Comanche County, Texas
Year	Republican		Democratic		Third party(ies)	
Year	No.	%	No.	%	No.	%
1912	68	3.52%	1,659	85.83%	206	10.66%
1916	148	7.57%	1,494	76.38%	314	16.05%
1920	930	32.52%	1,633	57.10%	297	10.38%
1924	456	53.90%	276	32.62%	114	13.48%
1928	1,483	53.08%	1,311	46.92%	0	0.00%
1932	192	5.75%	3,134	93.86%	13	0.39%
1936	355	11.81%	2,587	86.09%	63	2.10%
1940	610	15.90%	3,226	84.08%	1	0.03%
1944	356	9.40%	2,941	77.66%	490	12.94%
1948	408	11.64%	2,915	83.17%	182	5.19%
1952	2,411	52.46%	2,181	47.45%	4	0.09%
1956	1,900	48.99%	1,962	50.59%	16	0.41%
1960	1,828	47.73%	1,979	51.67%	23	0.60%
1964	962	25.19%	2,851	74.65%	6	0.16%
1968	1,436	34.81%	1,980	48.00%	709	17.19%
1972	2,608	68.31%	1,176	30.80%	34	0.89%
1976	1,297	27.41%	3,414	72.16%	20	0.42%
1980	1,977	43.09%	2,550	55.58%	61	1.33%
1984	2,678	54.12%	2,248	45.43%	22	0.44%
1988	2,120	44.53%	2,622	55.07%	19	0.40%
1992	1,666	31.75%	2,296	43.75%	1,286	24.50%
1996	2,123	44.42%	2,138	44.74%	518	10.84%
2000	3,334	66.39%	1,636	32.58%	52	1.04%
2004	3,813	72.38%	1,431	27.16%	24	0.46%
2008	3,813	73.09%	1,334	25.57%	70	1.34%
2012	3,944	80.39%	890	18.14%	72	1.47%
2016	4,333	82.74%	789	15.07%	115	2.20%
2020	5,177	85.06%	853	14.02%	56	0.92%
2024	5,679	86.78%	834	12.74%	31	0.47%

United States Senate election results for Comanche County, Texas1
Year	Republican		Democratic		Third party(ies)	
Year	No.	%	No.	%	No.	%
2024	5,435	83.54%	962	14.79%	109	1.68%

United States Senate election results for Comanche County, Texas2
Year	Republican		Democratic		Third party(ies)	
Year	No.	%	No.	%	No.	%
2020	5,053	84.16%	831	13.84%	120	2.00%

Texas Gubernatorial election results for Comanche County
Year	Republican		Democratic		Third party(ies)	
Year	No.	%	No.	%	No.	%
2022	4,203	87.09%	567	11.75%	56	1.16%

== Education ==
School districts include:

- Blanket Independent School District
- Comanche Independent School District
- De Leon Independent School District
- Dublin Independent School District
- Gorman Independent School District
- Gustine Independent School District
- Hamilton Independent School District
- Hico Independent School District
- Lingleville Independent School District
- May Independent School District
- Mullin Independent School District
- Priddy Independent School District
- Rising Star Independent School District
- Sidney Independent School District
- Zephyr Independent School District

It is in the Ranger College district according to the Texas Education Code.

== See also ==
- List of sundown towns in the United States
- National Register of Historic Places listings in Comanche County, Texas
- Recorded Texas Historic Landmarks in Comanche County
