= Gorman, Texas =

- City
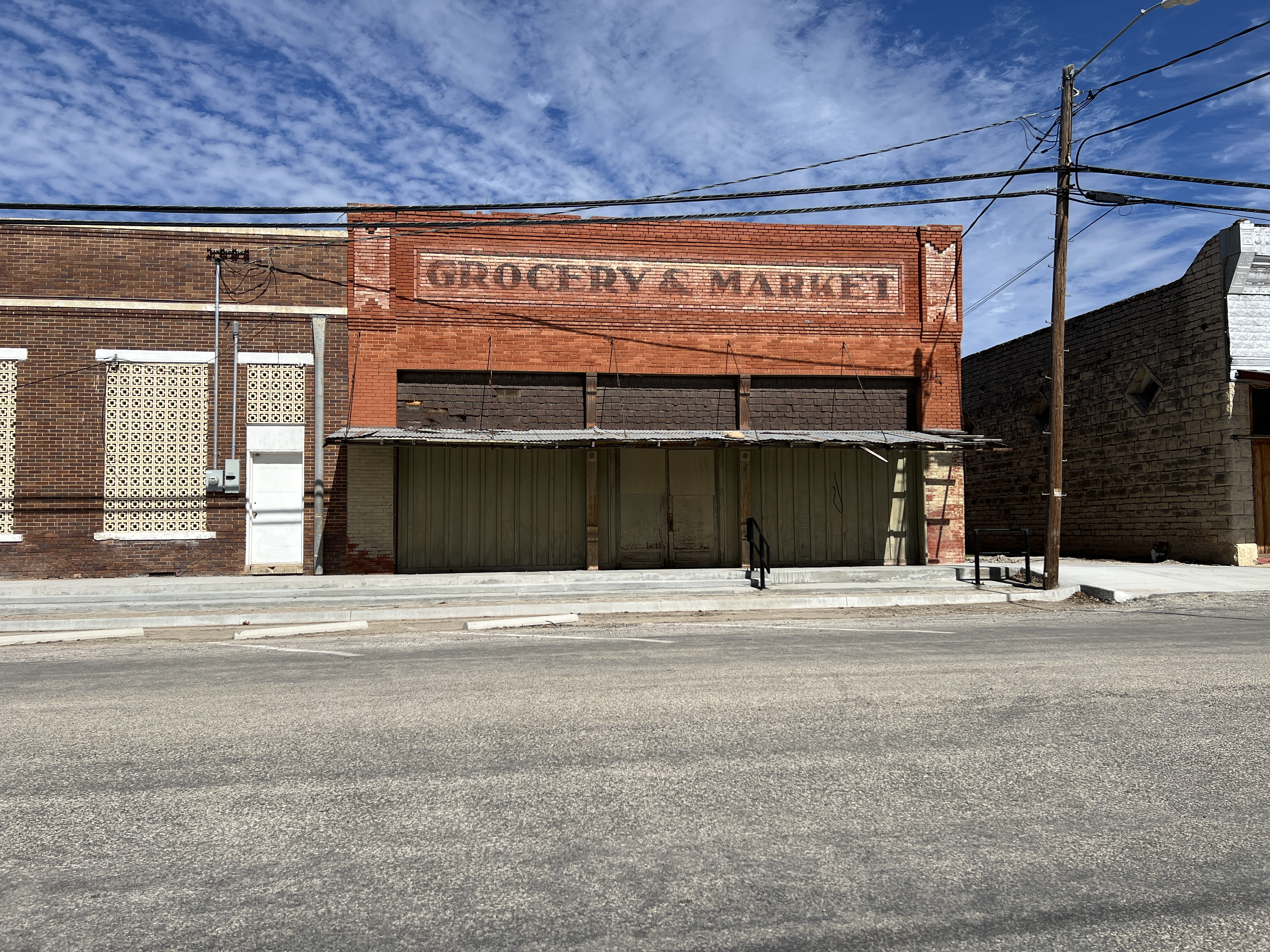
- Abandoned Grocery Store in Gorman, Texas

- Location within Texas Location within the United States
- Coordinates: 32°12′49″N 98°40′19″W
- Country: United States
- State: Texas
- County: Eastland

Area
  - Total: 1.64 sq mi (4.26 km^{2})
  - Land: 1.64 sq mi (4.26 km^{2})
  - Water: 0 sq mi (0.00 km^{2})
- Elevation: 1,450 ft (440 m)

Population (2020)
  - Total: 976
  - Density: 629.9/sq mi (243.19/km^{2})
- Time zone: UTC-6 (Central (CST))
  - Summer (DST): UTC-5 (CDT)
- ZIP code: 76454
- Area code: 254
- FIPS code: 48-30308
- GNIS feature ID: 2410625
- Website: thecityofgorman.com

Gorman is a city in Eastland County, Texas, United States. Its population was 976 at the 2020 census, down from 1,083 at the 2010 census.

== Geography ==
Gorman is located in southeastern Eastland County. Texas State Highway 6 passes through the community, leading northwest 20 miles (32 km) to Eastland, the county seat, and southeast 11 miles (18 km) to De Leon.

According to the United States Census Bureau, the city has a total area of 1.7 square miles (4.3 km^{2}), all land.

=== Climate ===
The climate in this area is characterized by hot, humid summers and generally mild to cool winters. According to the Köppen climate classification, Gorman has a humid subtropical climate, Cfa on climate maps.

== Demographics ==
Historical population
Census	Pop.	Note	%±
1910	963		—
1920	3,200		232.3%
1930	1,154		−63.9%
1940	1,157		0.3%
1950	1,317		13.8%
1960	1,142		−13.3%
1970	1,236		8.2%
1980	1,258		1.8%
1990	1,290		2.5%
2000	1,236		−4.2%
2010	1,083		−12.4%
2020	976		−9.9%
U.S. Decennial Census

=== 2020 census ===
As of the 2020 census, there were 976 people living in Gorman, and the median age was 38.5 years; 25.4% of residents were under the age of 18 and 18.0% were 65 years of age or older.

For every 100 females there were 92.5 males, and for every 100 females age 18 and over there were 93.6 males age 18 and over.

0.0% of residents lived in urban areas, while 100.0% lived in rural areas.

There were 379 households in Gorman, of which 30.9% had children under the age of 18 living in them. Of all households, 48.8% were married-couple households, 18.5% were households with a male householder and no spouse or partner present, and 27.4% were households with a female householder and no spouse or partner present. About 29.1% of all households were made up of individuals and 15.8% had someone living alone who was 65 years of age or older.

There were 489 housing units, of which 22.5% were vacant. The homeowner vacancy rate was 1.1% and the rental vacancy rate was 5.7%.

Racial composition as of the 2020 census
Race	Number	Percent
White	699	71.6%
Black or African American	7	0.7%
American Indian and Alaska Native	5	0.5%
Asian	1	0.1%
Native Hawaiian and Other Pacific Islander	4	0.4%
Some other race	89	9.1%
Two or more races	171	17.5%
Hispanic or Latino (of any race)	374	38.3%

Gorman racial composition (NH = Non-Hispanic) (Note: Note: the US Census treats Hispanic/Latino as an ethnic category. This table excludes Latinos from the racial categories and assigns them to a separate category. Hispanics/Latinos can be of any race.)
Race	Number	Percentage
White (NH)	564	57.79%
Black or African American (NH)	4	0.41%
Native American or Alaska Native (NH)	2	0.2%
Asian (NH)	1	0.1%
Pacific Islander (NH)	4	0.41%
Mixed/Multi-Racial (NH)	27	2.77%
Hispanic or Latino	374	38.32%
Total	976	

=== 2000 census ===
As of the census of 2000, 1,236 people, 474 households, and 310 families were residing in the city. The population density was 750.7 inhabitants per square mile (289.8/km^{2}). The 569 housing units averaged 345.6/sq mi (133.1/km^{2}). The racial makeup of the city was 80.42% White, 0.08% African American, 0.89% Native American, 17.72% from other races, and 0.89% from two or more races. Hispanics or Latinos of any race were 29.13% of the population.

Of the 474 households, 33.1% had children under 18 living with them, 51.1% were married couples living together, 9.7% had a female householder with no husband present, and 34.4% were not families. About 32.7% of all households were made up of individuals, and 21.1% had someone living alone who was 65 or older. The average household size was 2.53, and the average family size was 3.24.

In the city, the age distribution was 28.2% under 18, 8.4% from 18 to 24, 24.1% from 25 to 44, 18.4% from 45 to 64, and 20.8% who were 65 years of age or older. The median age was 38 years. For every 100 females, there were 85.9 males. For every 100 females age 18 and over, there were 79.9 males.

The median income for a household in the city was $26,758, and for a family was $32,431. Males had a median income of $25,800 versus $18,417 for females. The per capita income for the city was $11,906. 16.3% of the population and 10.1% of families were below the poverty line. Out of the total population, 20.4% of those under the age of 18 and 19.6% of those 65 and older were living below the poverty line.

== Education ==
The city is served by the Gorman Independent School District.

== Notable people ==
- George Cumby, NFL linebacker
- Joe Isbell, NFL offensive guard
