= Gustine, Texas =

- Town
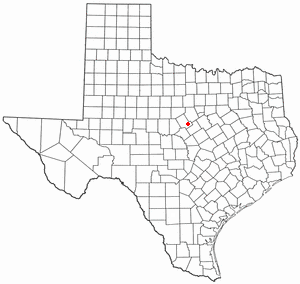
- Location of Gustine, Texas

- Coordinates: 31°50′44″N 98°24′09″W
- Country: United States
- State: Texas
- County: Comanche

Area
  - Total: 0.92 sq mi (2.37 km^{2})
  - Land: 0.92 sq mi (2.37 km^{2})
  - Water: 0 sq mi (0.00 km^{2})
- Elevation: 1,191 ft (363 m)

Population (2020)
  - Total: 392
  - Density: 428/sq mi (165/km^{2})
- Time zone: UTC-6 (Central (CST))
  - Summer (DST): UTC-5 (CDT)
- ZIP code: 76455
- Area code: 325
- FIPS code: 48-31628
- GNIS feature ID: 2412715
- Website: www.gustinetx.gov

Gustine is a town located in Comanche County in Central Texas, United States. The population was 392 at the 2020 census, down from 476 at the 2010 census. The town, formerly known as Cora, was the county seat in the 1850s.

== Geography ==
According to the United States Census Bureau, the town has a total area of 0.9 square miles (2.3 km^{2}), all of it land.

== Demographics ==
Historical population
| Census | Pop. | Note | %± |
|---|---|---|---|
| 1930 | 368 | | — |
| 1940 | 409 | | 11.1% |
| 1950 | 421 | | 2.9% |
| 1960 | 380 | | −9.7% |
| 1970 | 357 | | −6.1% |
| 1980 | 416 | | 16.5% |
| 1990 | 430 | | 3.4% |
| 2000 | 457 | | 6.3% |
| 2010 | 476 | | 4.2% |
| 2020 | 392 | | −17.6% |
U.S. Decennial Census

As of the census of 2000, 457 people, 180 households, and 129 families were residing in the town. The population density was 500.6 people/sq mi (193.9/km^{2}). The 215 housing units averaged 235.5/sq mi (91.2/km^{2}). The racial makeup of the town was 89.28% White, 10.28% from other races, and 0.44% from two or more races. Hispanics or Latinos of any race were 23.41% of the population.

Of the 180 households, 31.7% had children under 18 living with them, 53.9% were married couples living together, 11.7% had a female householder with no husband present, and 27.8% were not families. About 27.2% of all households were made up of individuals, and 18.3% had someone living alone who was 65 or older. The average household size was 2.54 and the average family size was 3.05.

In the town, the population was spread out, with 26.5% under 18, 8.3% from 18 to 24, 24.3% from 25 to 44, 21.4% from 45 to 64, and 19.5% who were 65 or older. The median age was 38 years. For every 100 females, there were 88.1 males. For every 100 females age 18 and over, there were 93.1 males.

The median income for a household in the town was $28,889, and for a family was $35,000. Males had a median income of $22,667 versus $15,714 for females. The per capita income for the town was $12,666. About 14.7% of families and 20.9% of the population were below the poverty line, including 32.2% of those under age 18 and 17.3% of those age 65 or over.

== Local media ==
Comanche County is currently listed as part of the Dallas-Fort Worth DMA. Local television media outlets include: KDFW-TV, KXAS-TV, WFAA-TV, KTVT-TV, KERA-TV, KTXA-TV, KDFI-TV, KDAF-TV, and KFWD-TV. Other nearby stations that provide coverage for the Gustine and Comanche County area include: KCEN-TV, KWTX-TV, and KAKW-DT from the Waco/Temple/Killeen DMA. As well as KTXS-TV, KTAB-TV, and KRBC-TV from the Abilene/Sweetwater/Brownwood DMA. The Comanche Chief serves as the area's local newspaper.

== Education ==
The Town of Gustine is served by the Gustine Independent School District.
