= Gustine Independent School District =

School district in Texas

Coordinates: 31.8471°N 98.4109°W

Gustine Independent School District is a public school district based in Gustine, Texas, United States.

The district has three schools that serve students in prekindergarten through grade 12.

== Academic achievement ==
In 2009, the school district was rated "academically acceptable" by the Texas Education Agency.

== Special programs ==
=== Athletics ===
Gustine High School plays six-man football.

== See also ==
- List of school districts in Texas
