= Comanche Independent School District =

School district in Texas

Comanche Independent School District is a public school district based in Comanche, Texas (USA).

Located in Comanche County, a very small portion of the district extends into Mills County.

In 2009, the school district was rated "academically acceptable" by the Texas Education Agency.

== Schools ==
- Comanche High School (Grades 9-12)
- Jefferies Junior High School (Grades 6-8)
- Comanche Elementary School (Grades PK-5)

== High school ==
The High school's principal is Joni Patterson

Between the 2007-2008 and the 2008-2009 school years, Comanche High School moved from UIL conference 3A to conference 2A.
