= Comanche, Texas =

- City
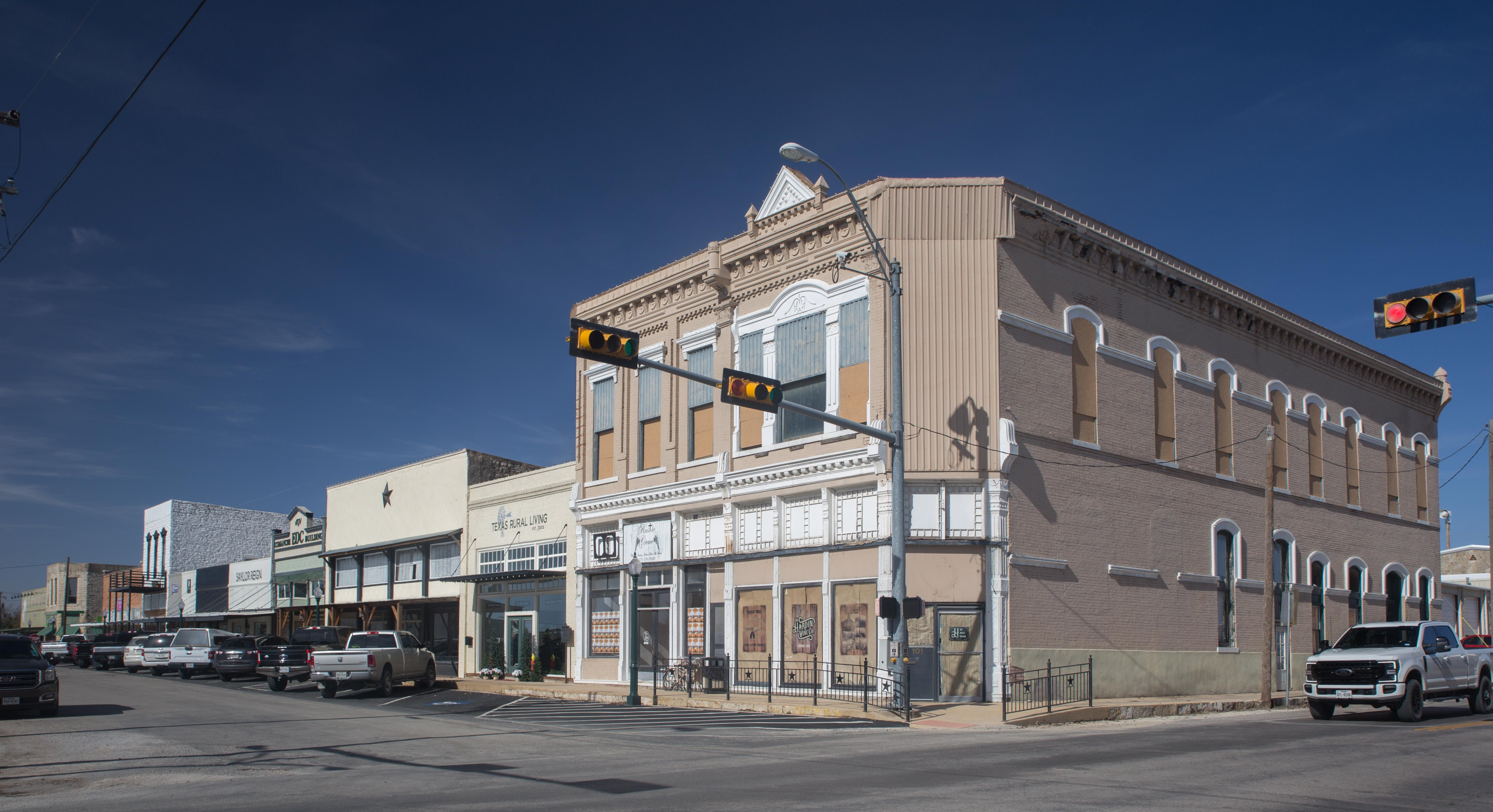
- Downtown Comanche, Texas (2022)

- Location within Texas
- Coordinates: 31°53′51″N 98°37′13″W
- Country: United States
- State: Texas
- County: Comanche
- Region: Central Texas
- Established: 1858

Area
  - Total: 4.56 sq mi (11.81 km^{2})
  - Land: 4.56 sq mi (11.81 km^{2})
  - Water: 0 sq mi (0.00 km^{2})
- Elevation: 1,381 ft (421 m)

Population (2020)
  - Total: 4,211
  - Density: 923.5/sq mi (356.6/km^{2})
- Time zone: UTC-6 (CST)
- ZIP code: 76442
- Area code: 325
- FIPS code: 48-16192
- GNIS feature ID: 2410207
- Website: www.comanchetexas.gov

Comanche is a city located in Comanche County in the U.S. state of Texas. The population was 4,211 at the 2020 census. It is the county seat of Comanche County.

== History ==
A military road known as the "Corn Trail" came through in 1850 to supply area forts and encourage settlement. The town was established in 1856 and the city was incorporated in 1858. Near the modern courthouse is the preserved log structure known as the "Old Cora Courthouse", one of the oldest standing wooden courthouses in Texas. Cora, the former county seat, later became Gustine.

== Geography ==
According to the United States Census Bureau, the city has a total area of 4.5 square miles (12 km^{2}), all land.

=== Climate ===
The climate in this area is characterized by hot, humid summers and generally mild to cool winters. According to the Köppen climate classification system, Comanche has a humid subtropical climate, Cfa on climate maps.

== Demographics ==
Historical population
Census	Pop.	Note	%±
1880	704		—
1890	1,226		74.1%
1900	2,070		68.8%
1910	2,756		33.1%
1920	3,524		27.9%
1930	2,435		−30.9%
1940	3,209		31.8%
1950	3,840		19.7%
1960	3,415		−11.1%
1970	3,933		15.2%
1980	4,075		3.6%
1990	4,087		0.3%
2000	4,482		9.7%
2010	4,335		−3.3%
2020	4,211		−2.9%
U.S. Decennial Census

=== 2020 census ===
As of the 2020 census, Comanche had a population of 4,211, 1,603 households, and 990 families.

The median age was 37.2 years; 27.2% of residents were under the age of 18, and 19.5% of residents were 65 years of age or older. For every 100 females there were 93.0 males, and for every 100 females age 18 and over there were 91.1 males age 18 and over.

0% of residents lived in urban areas, while 100.0% lived in rural areas.

There were 1,603 households in Comanche, of which 34.7% had children under the age of 18 living in them. Of all households, 45.7% were married-couple households, 19.7% were households with a male householder and no spouse or partner present, and 30.1% were households with a female householder and no spouse or partner present. About 29.1% of all households were made up of individuals and 17.2% had someone living alone who was 65 years of age or older.

There were 1,921 housing units, of which 16.6% were vacant. Among occupied housing units, 69.0% were owner-occupied and 31.0% were renter-occupied. The homeowner vacancy rate was 2.8% and the rental vacancy rate was 15.7%.

Racial composition as of the 2020 census
Race	Number	Percent
White	2,802	66.5%
Black or African American	22	0.5%
American Indian and Alaska Native	45	1.1%
Asian	24	0.6%
Native Hawaiian and Other Pacific Islander	1	<0.1%
Some other race	631	15.0%
Two or more races	686	16.3%
Hispanic or Latino (of any race)	1,791	42.5%

=== 2000 census ===
As of the census of 2000, 4,482 people, 1,656 households, and 1,157 families resided in the city. The population density was 998.3 inhabitants per square mile (385.4/km^{2}). The 1,898 housing units averaged 422.8 units per square mile (163.2 units/km^{2}). The racial makeup of the city was 80.01% White, 1.20% African American, 1.09% Native American, 0.22% Asian, 15.13% from other races, and 2.34% from two or more races. Hispanics or Latinos of any race were 28.51% of the population.

Of the 1,656 households, 34.2% had children under the age of 18 living with them, 55.9% were married couples living together, 10.3% had a female householder with no husband present, and 30.1% were not families. About 28.2% of all households were made up of individuals, and 17.2% had someone living alone who was 65 years of age or older. The average household size was 2.56 and the average family size was 3.14.

In the city, the population was distributed as 28.0% under the age of 18, 7.5% from 18 to 24, 24.7% from 25 to 44, 19.5% from 45 to 64, and 20.2% who were 65 years of age or older. The median age was 36 years. For every 100 females, there were 88.1 males. For every 100 females age 18 and over, there were 87.2 males.

The median income for a household in the city was $26,773, and for a family was $32,097. Males had a median income of $26,646 versus $16,958 for females. The per capita income for the city was $12,155. About 17.0% of families and 20.0% of the population were below the poverty line, including 23.7% of those under age 18 and 19.7% of those age 65 or over.

== Arts and culture ==
The Comanche County Historical Museum in Comanche features a blacksmith shop, filling station, and doctor's office. A replica saloon depicts the site where gunfighter John Wesley Hardin killed a deputy in 1874.

== Education ==
The City of Comanche is served by the Comanche Independent School District, which consists of Comanche Elementary, Comanche Middle School, H.R. Jefferies Junior High, and Comanche High School. Also, Premier Accelerated Charter School for high school-aged students is located in Comanche.

== Infrastructure ==
=== Transportation ===
==== Highways ====
- U.S. Route 67
- U.S. Route 377 (concurrent with U.S. Route 67)
- Texas State Highway 16
- Texas State Highway 36
- Farm to Market 590
- Farm to Market 1689
- Farm to Market 2247
- Farm to Market 3381

==== Rail ====
Comanche is located on the main line of the Fort Worth and Western Railroad. As of 2024, the rail line is used for freight haulage only; no scheduled passenger service is offered.

==== Air ====
Comanche County–City Airport is a general aviation airport located northeast of Comanche. It is owned by the city of Comanche and Comanche County.

== Notable people ==
- Ben F. Barnes, 36th Lieutenant Governor of Texas
- Robert T. Hill, pioneer Texas geologist
- Justin Holland, member of the Texas House of Representatives, 2017–present
- David Kersh and Kerry Harvick, country music singers who reside in Comanche

== See also ==
- Fort Worth and Rio Grande Railway
