= Olin, Texas =

- Unincorporated community
- Location within Texas Location within the United States
- Coordinates: 31°52′39″N 98°06′25″W
- Country: United States
- State: Texas
- County: Hamilton
- Elevation: 1,276 ft (389 m)
- Time zone: UTC-6 (Central (CST))
  - Summer (DST): UTC-5 (CDT)
- Area code: 254
- GNIS feature ID: 1378803

Olin is an unincorporated community in Hamilton County, in the U.S. state of Texas. According to the Handbook of Texas, the community had a population of 12 in 2000.

== Geography ==
Olin is located at the intersection of U.S. Highway 281 and Farm to Market Road 219, 12 mi (19 km) north of Hamilton and 10 mi (16 km) south of Hico in northern Hamilton County. It is also located 30 mi (48 km) south of Stephenville.

== Education ==
Olin had a school at the start of the 20th century, which burned to the ground in 1938. Students were then sent to school in either Hamilton, Carlton, or Hico. Today the community is served by the Hico Independent School District.
