= Alexander, Texas =

Unincorporated community in Texas, US

Coordinates: 32°03′33″N 98°12′22″W

Alexander is an unincorporated community located in southern Erath County in Central Texas, United States. Alexander is located in the southern part of the county, along Texas State Highway 6 and Fm-914. The town was originally called: "Harper's Mill" when the Post Office was approved for operation around the 1870s. The name was changed in the 1880s, when the Texas Central line, part of the historic Katy Railroad, was built from east to west through the townsite on its way from the Waco area to Stamford, with a branch to Cross Plains from the line at De Leon. In 1907, the Stephenville North and South Texas Railway, part of the Cotton Belt Route, was constructed from north to south and intersected with the Katy's line in Alexander. This made the town an important community for business in the area. The Cotton Belt Route ran from Stephenville through to nearby Carlton. On October 17, 1934, the Cotton Belt Route was abandoned from Stephenville to Hamilton. The Katy Railroad remained through Alexander until its abandonment in the late 1960s. The Alexander post office closed in 1970 and the population remained at a steady 40 from the 1970s through 2000.
