= Aleman, Texas =

- Unincorporated community
- Location within Texas Location within the United States
- Coordinates: 31°37′57″N 98°02′32″W
- Country: United States
- State: Texas
- County: Hamilton
- Elevation: 1,171 ft (357 m)
- Time zone: UTC-6 (Central (CST))
  - Summer (DST): UTC-5 (CDT)
- Area code: 254
- GNIS feature ID: 1329344

Aleman is an unincorporated community in Hamilton County, in the U.S. state of Texas. According to the Handbook of Texas, the community had a population of 60 in 2000.

== History ==
Aleman was first settled by German immigrants from Washington County. The community's population was 60 in the years 1980, 1990, and 2000.

== Geography ==
Aleman is located at the intersection of Farm to Market Roads 932 and 3340, 8 mi (13 km) southeast of Hamilton in central Hamilton County.

== Education ==
Aleman had an elementary school in 1954. Today the community is served by the Hamilton Independent School District.
