= Mary Billings (disambiguation) =

Mary Billings may also refer to:

- Mary Billings (1776–1826), American educator
- Mary Billings French (1869–1951), American heiress and society figure
- Mary C. Billings (1824–1904), American evangelist, missionary and writer
