= Carlton, Texas =

Census-designated place in Hamilton County, Texas, United States

- Census-designated place
- Location within Texas Location within the United States
- Coordinates: 31°55′11″N 98°10′17″W
- Country: United States
- State: Texas
- County: Hamilton

Area
  - Total: 0.78 sq mi (2.03 km^{2})
- Elevation: 1,332 ft (406 m)

Population (2020)
  - Total: 102
  - Density: 130/sq mi (50.2/km^{2})
- Time zone: UTC-6 (Central (CST))
  - Summer (DST): UTC-5 (CDT)
- ZIP codes: 76436
- Area code: 254
- GNIS feature ID: 2805785

Carlton is a census-designated place (CDP) in Hamilton County in Central Texas, United States. It lies in the northeastern part of the county, and as of the 2020 census had a population of 102.

== History ==
Carlton was founded in 1877 by a man named H.H. Armstrong on land owned by two local settlers; rancher J. M. Evans and Dr. F. M. Carlton, the town's namesake. With growth stimulated by its location on the major area stagecoach line, Carlton prospered through the late 1870s and by 1878 possessed its own school and several churches. In 1879, the post office at nearby Honey Creek was moved to Carlton and renamed for its new location. In 1900, the community had a reported population of just over 160 and several businesses, including a large cotton gin. The Stephenville North and South Texas Railway, part of the historic Cotton Belt Route, was built through Carlton in 1907 on its way from nearby Alexander to Hamilton. Carlton reached its peak population of 750 residents by 1910. During this time, two small weekly newspapers had served the area; the Courier, which ran from 1907 to 1909, and the Citizen, which ran 1910-1936.

Prosperity came to an end in the 1930s, however. Effects of the boll weevil blight of the 1920s and the Great Depression exacted a dire toll on Carlton. The railroad was abandoned in 1934, and by 1940 the population had fallen to 400. The declining population led to the closing of the Carlton schools in 1969 and by 1980 the reported population had dropped to seventy, a figure it maintained through to the 2000 Census.

== Demographics ==
Historical population
Census	Pop.	Note	%±
2020	102		—
U.S. Decennial Census; 1850–1900 1910; 1920 1930 1940; 1950 1960 1970; 1980 1990 2000; 2010 2020

Carlton first appeared as a census designated place in the 2020 U.S. census.

=== 2020 Census ===
Carlton CDP, Texas – Racial and ethnic composition Note: the US Census treats Hispanic/Latino as an ethnic category. This table excludes Latinos from the racial categories and assigns them to a separate category. Hispanics/Latinos may be of any race.
Race / Ethnicity (NH = Non-Hispanic)	Pop 2020	% 2020
White alone (NH)	83	81.37%
Black or African American alone (NH)	0	0.00%
Native American or Alaska Native alone (NH)	2	1.96%
Asian alone (NH)	0	0.00%
Native Hawaiian or Pacific Islander alone (NH)	0	0.00%
Other race alone (NH)	0	0.00%
Mixed race or Multiracial (NH)	5	4.90%
Hispanic or Latino (any race)	12	11.76%
Total	102	100.00%

== Education ==
Carlton is served by the Hico Independent School District.

== Miscellaneous ==
Portions of Carlton's ZIP code: 76436 extend into neighboring areas of Comanche and Erath counties in Central Texas. Carlton has one large historic town cemetery, located on the north side of Fm-2823, going from Carlton west towards the Comanche County line.

== See also ==
- List of census-designated places in Texas
- Stephenville North & South Texas Railroad
