= HISD =

HISD may stand for:

- Hale Center Independent School District, in Hale Center, Texas
- Hallettsville Independent School District, in Hallettsville, Texas
- Hallsburg Independent School District, in Hallsburg, Texas
- Hallsville Independent School District, in Hallsville, Texas
- Hamilton Independent School District, in Hamilton, Texas
- Hamlin Independent School District, in Hamlin, Texas
- Hamshire-Fannett Independent School District, Jefferson County, Texas
- Happy Independent School District, in Happy, Texas
- Hardin Independent School District, in Hardin, Texas
- Hardin-Jefferson Independent School District, in Sour Lake, Texas
- Harlandale Independent School District, in San Antonio, Texas
- Harleton Independent School District, in Harleton, Texas
- Harlingen Consolidated Independent School District, in Harlingen, Texas
- Harmony Independent School District, in Upshur County, Texas
- Harper Independent School District, in the community of Harper
- Harrold Independent School District, in Harrold, Texas
- Hart Independent School District, in Hart, Texas
- Hartley Independent School District, in Hartley, Texas
- Harts Bluff Independent School District, in Titus County, Texas
- Haskell Consolidated Independent School District, in Haskell, Texas
- Hawkins Independent School District, in Hawkins, Texas
- Hawley Independent School District, in Hawley, Texas
- Hays Consolidated Independent School District, in Kyle, Texas
- Hearne Independent School District, in Hearne, Texas
- Hedley Independent School District, in Hedley, Texas
- Hemphill Independent School District, in Hemphill, Texas
- Hempstead Independent School District, in Hempstead, Texas
- Henderson Independent School District, in Henderson, Texas
- Henrietta Independent School District, in Henrietta, Texas
- Hereford Independent School District, in Hereford, Texas
- Hermleigh Independent School District, in Hermleigh, Texas
- Hico Independent School District, in Hico, Texas
- Hidalgo Independent School District, in Hidalgo, Texas
- Higgins Independent School District, in Higgins, Texas
- High Island Independent School District, in Galveston County, Texas
- Highland Independent School District, in southwestern Nolan County, Texas
- Highland Park Independent School District (Potter County, Texas)
- Highland Park Independent School District, in Dallas County, Texas
- Hillsboro Independent School District, in Hillsboro, Texas
- Hitchcock Independent School District, in Hitchcock, Texas
- Holland Independent School District, in Holland, Texas
- Holliday Independent School District, in Holliday, Texas
- Hondo Independent School District, in Hondo, Texas
- Honey Grove Independent School District, in Honey Grove, Texas
- Hooks Independent School District, in Hooks, Texas
- Houston Independent School District, in Houston, Texas
- Howe Independent School District, in Howe, Texas
- Hubbard Independent School District (Bowie County, Texas)
- Hubbard Independent School District (Hill County, Texas)
- Huckabay Independent School District, Huckabay, Texas
- Hudson Independent School District, in Hudson, Texas
- Huffman Independent School District, in Huffman, Texas
- Hughes Springs Independent School District, in Hughes Springs, Texas
- Hull-Daisetta Independent School District, in Daisetta, Texas
- Humble Independent School District
- Hunt Independent School District, in Hunt, Texas
- Huntington Independent School District, in Huntington, Texas
- Huntsville Independent School District, in Huntsville, Texas
- Hurst-Euless-Bedford Independent School District
- Hutto Independent School District, in Hutto, Texas
- Huron Intermediate School District, in Bad Axe, Michigan
