= Gentry's Mill, Texas =

- Unincorporated community
- Location within Texas Location within the United States
- Coordinates: 31°37′42″N 98°13′32″W
- Country: United States
- State: Texas
- County: Hamilton
- Elevation: 1,132 ft (345 m)
- Time zone: UTC-6 (Central (CST))
  - Summer (DST): UTC-5 (CDT)
- Area code: 254
- GNIS feature ID: 1378348

Gentry's Mill is an unincorporated community in Hamilton County, in the U.S. state of Texas. According to the Handbook of Texas, the community had a population of 17 in 2000.

== History ==
Gentry's Mill was named for Frederick Browder Gentry. He settled in this area in 1875 on Waring Creek and owned a wheat and corn mill. S.C. Terry then built a gin. A post office was established at Gentry's Mill in 1876 and remained in operation until 1895. Its population was 75 in 1884. The 1983 county highway map showed a church, cemetery, and community center in the community. Its population was 17 in 2000.

== Geography ==
Gentry's Mill is located 8 mi (13 km) northwest of Hamilton in north-central Hamilton County.

== Education ==
Gentry's Mill had a school until 1950. Today the community is served by the Hamilton Independent School District.
