= Pottsville, Texas =

- Unincorporated community
- Location within Texas Location within the United States
- Coordinates: 31°40′24″N 98°19′32″W
- Country: United States
- State: Texas
- County: Hamilton
- Elevation: 1,322 ft (403 m)
- Time zone: UTC-6 (Central (CST))
  - Summer (DST): UTC-5 (CDT)
- ZIP codes: 76565
- GNIS feature ID: 1344442

Pottsville is an unincorporated community located in western Hamilton County in Central Texas, United States.

== History ==
Named for early settler John Potts, who was a shepherd, the community was founded as a dry town in 1872 when Edmund T. Goggin donated land for the townsite. A post office was established in 1879. Pottsville has undergone multiple catastrophes: every business was burned in a 1913 fire, and great damage was done by a 1944 tornado, which killed one person. The local cotton gin closed in 1931. The community had a population of 200 in 1947 and had four businesses. It went up to 312 in the 1980s with three churches, a feed store, a mill, a garage, a store, and a beauty parlor. It remained at 312 in 1990 and went down to 100 in 2000.

Potts' friend, Thomas Jefferson Burks, built a store in the community in 1877. Mail was delivered to the community from Hamilton by a mule-drawn carriage and then by a horse-drawn carriage. The community burned again in 1922.

Although Pottsville is unincorporated, it has a post office, with the ZIP code of 76565; the ZCTA for ZIP Code 76565 had a population of 142 at the 2000 census.

== Geography ==
Pottsville lies at the intersection of Fm-218, 221, and 2842 on Cowhouse Creek, 11 mi (18 km) west of the city of Hamilton, 96 mi (154 km) southwest of Fort Worth, and 124 mi (200 km) northwest of Austin in western Hamilton County.

=== Climate ===
The climate in this area is characterized by relatively high temperatures and evenly distributed precipitation throughout the year. The Köppen Climate System describes the weather as humid subtropical, and uses the abbreviation Cfa.

== Education ==
Pottsville is within the Hamilton Independent School District. The Pottsville Independent School District merged into the Hamilton district on July 1, 1989. Its first school was founded in 1876 and remained operational in 1986. It had an elementary and high school during that decade.

== In popular culture ==
The Jim Thompson novel Pop. 1280 takes place in a fictional town of Pottsville.
