= Hamilton High School (Texas) =

Location
- 611 South College Street; Hamilton, Texas 76531-0392; United States; 31.699281°N 98.127332°W

Information
- School type: Public high school
- School district: Hamilton Independent School District
- Principal: Gina Poe
- Grades: 9-12
- Enrollment: 253 (2023-2024)
- Colors: Red, black, and white
- Athletics conference: UIL Class 2A
- Mascot: Bulldog
- Website: Hamilton High School website

Hamilton High School is a public high school located in Hamilton, Texas, United States and classified as a 2A school by the University Interscholastic League (UIL). It is part of the Hamilton Independent School District located in central Hamilton County. In 2015, the school was rated "Met Standard" by the Texas Education Agency.

== Athletics ==
The Hamilton Bulldogs compete in these sports:

- Baseball
- Basketball
- Cross country
- Football
- Golf
- Powerlifting
- Softball
- Tennis
- Track and field
- Volleyball

=== State titles ===
- Boys golf
  - 1997 (2A), 1998 (2A), 1999 (2A)
- Football
  - 2025 (2A/D1)
- Girls basketball
  - 1952 (1A), 1998 (2A)
- Girls cross country
  - 1992 (2A), 1993 (2A), 1994 (2A), 1995 (2A), 1996 (2A), 2015 (2A), 2022 (2A), 2023 (2A), 2024 (2A), 2025 (2A)
- Girls golf
  - 1998 (2A), 1999 (2A), 2000 (2A), 2001 (2A)

==== State finalists ====
- Girls basketball
  - 1993 (2A)
- UIL Lone Star Cup Champions
  - 1998 (2A)

== Band ==
- UIL Marching Band Sweepstakes Champion -
  - 1980(1A)
