= Fairy, Texas =

- Unincorporated community
- Location within Texas Location within the United States
- Coordinates: 31°50′46″N 97°58′57″W
- Country: United States
- State: Texas
- County: Hamilton
- Elevation: 1,211 ft (369 m)
- Time zone: UTC-6 (Central (CST))
  - Summer (DST): UTC-5 (CDT)
- ZIP codes: 76457
- Area code: 254
- GNIS feature ID: 1335649

Fairy is an unincorporated community located in Hamilton County in Central Texas, United States.

== History ==
Fairy was originally known as Martin's Gap. James Martin was a settler who took an oxcart through the mountain gap. The town was named for Fairy Fort, the daughter of Confederate Army captain Battle Fort, when the post office was established in 1884. Fairy had a cotton gin from 1900 to about 1936 and schools, churches, and businesses serving the greater ranching and farming community. In 1947, Fairy had a post office, three churches, three businesses, and 150 people. The post office closed in 1957, and the Fairy school district was consolidated with the Hamilton schools in 1967. In 1980, 1990, and 2000 the population was 31. Its population went up to 40 in 2019.

== Geography ==
Fairy is located in the northern part of the county at the junction of FM 219 and FM 1602. It is located 10 mi (16 km) south of Hico, 26 mi (42 km) west of Meridian, and 30 mi (48 km) southeast of Stephenville.

== Education ==
Fairy is served by the Hamilton Independent School District.
