= Sunshine, Texas =

- Unincorporated community
- Location within Texas Location within the United States
- Coordinates: 31°51′49″N 98°08′41″W
- Country: United States
- State: Texas
- County: Hamilton
- Elevation: 1,283 ft (391 m)
- Time zone: UTC-6 (Central (CST))
  - Summer (DST): UTC-5 (CDT)
- GNIS feature ID: 1379132

Sunshine is an unincorporated community in Hamilton County, Texas, United States.
