= Shive, Texas =

- Unincorporated community
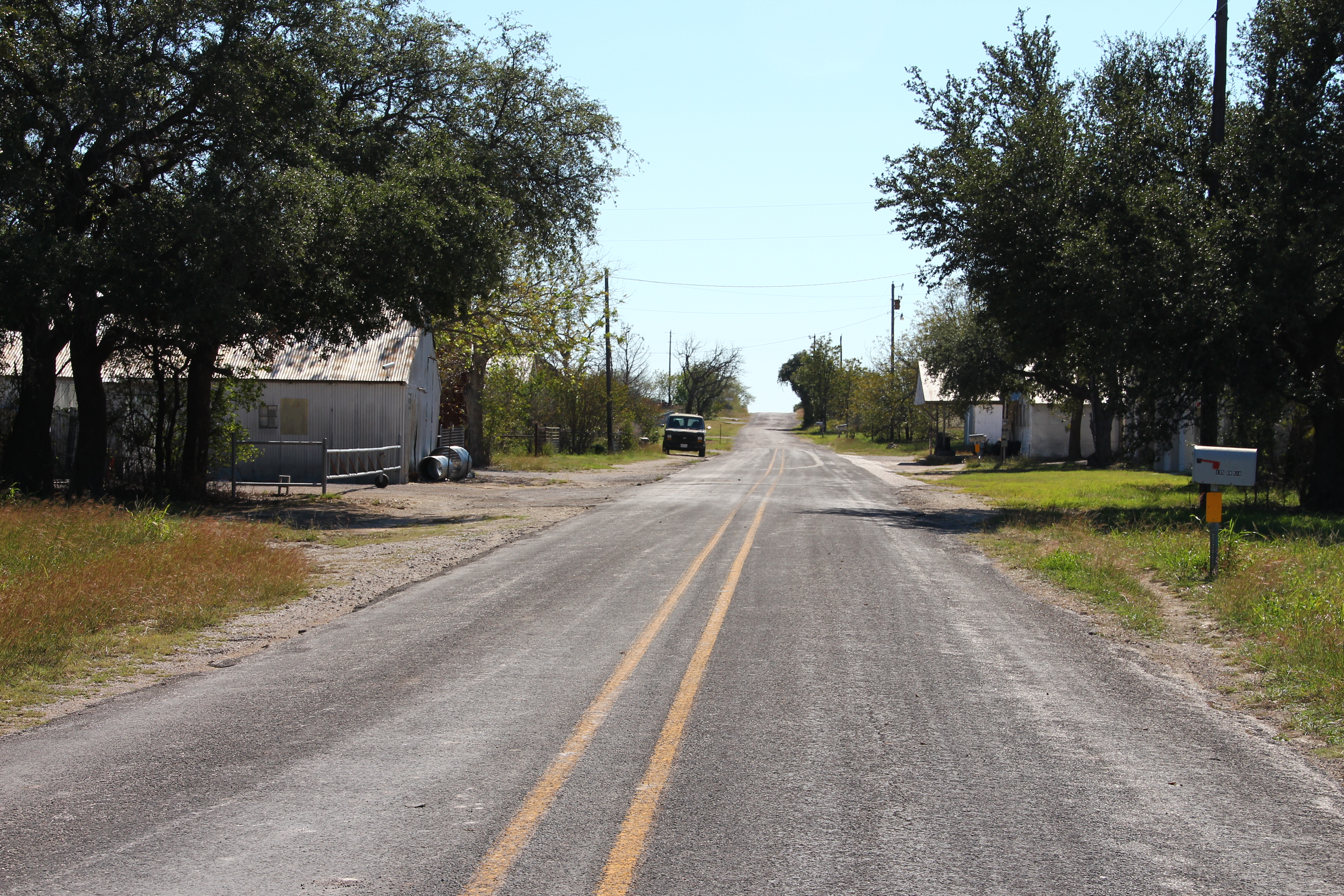
- Shive, Texas

- Location within Texas Location within the United States
- Coordinates: 31°36′45″N 98°14′05″W
- Country: United States
- State: Texas
- County: Hamilton
- Elevation: 1,339 ft (408 m)
- Time zone: UTC-6 (Central (CST))
  - Summer (DST): UTC-5 (CDT)
- GNIS feature ID: 1368212

Shive is an unincorporated community located in central Hamilton County in Central Texas, United States, along Fm-221.

== History ==
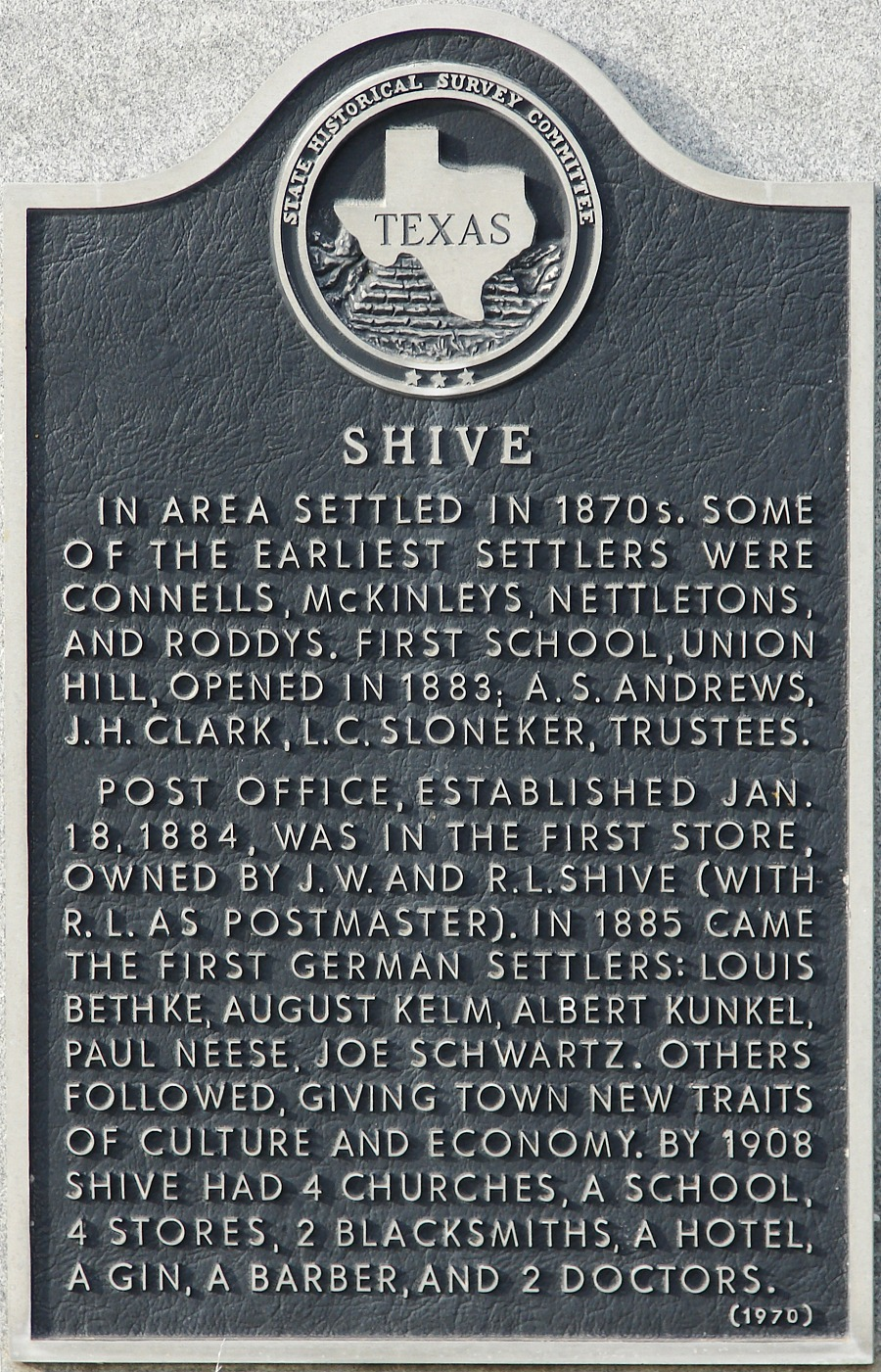
Historical marker for Shive

A group of people, including Lewis Paullin, settled in Shive in the 1870s. A man named Robert Shive was the namesake of the community. A post office opened inside a store operated by Robert and James W. Shive in 1884; Robert Shive was appointed as the postmaster. By 1908, the community of Shive had four stores. During that period, a cotton gin operated. In 1910, Shive had 50 residents. The post office closed in 1936. In 1940, Shive had 64 residents. In the period from 1980 to 2000, Shive had 61 residents.

== Education ==
Shive is located in the Hamilton Independent School District.

Shive received its first school, called the Union Hill School, in 1883.
