= Texas State Highway 220 =

State highway in Texas

State Highway 220
- SH 220; highlighted in red

Route information
- Maintained by TxDOT
- Length: 13.522 mi (21.762 km)
- Existed: 1935–present

Major junctions
- South end: SH 6 in Hico
- North end: US 67 near Chalk Mountain

Location
- Country: United States
- State: Texas
- Counties: Hamilton, Erath

Highway system
- Highways in Texas; Interstate; US; State; Former; Toll; Loops; Spurs; FM/RM; Park; Rec
← SH 219	→ SH 221

State Highway 220 (SH 220) is a Texas state highway located in Hamilton and Erath Counties.

== Route description ==
SH 220 begins at an intersection with SH 6 in Hico. The route travels generally to the northeast, and the only highway intersection between its termini is with FM 2481, approximately four miles north of Hico. SH 220 ends at an intersection with US 67 west of Chalk Mountain.

== History ==
SH 220 was designated on May 28, 1935 from Hico to Bluff Dale, but was not numbered until June 1935 (designated before SH 219). On July 15, 1935, SH 220 was cancelled as it had not yet been built. On August 1, 1936, SH 220 was restored. On August 1, 1938, SH 220 was moved to its current route.

== Major intersections ==
County	Location	mi	km	Destinations	Notes
Hamilton	Hico	0.0	0.0	SH 6 to US 281 – Meridian, Dublin	Southern terminus
Erath		3.8	6.1	FM 2481 – Duffau	
Erath		13.5	21.7	US 67 – Stephenville, Cleburne	Northern terminus
1.000 mi = 1.609 km; 1.000 km = 0.621 mi

== See also ==
- List of state highways in Texas
- List of highways numbered 220
