= Hamilton County, Texas =

County in Texas, United States

- County
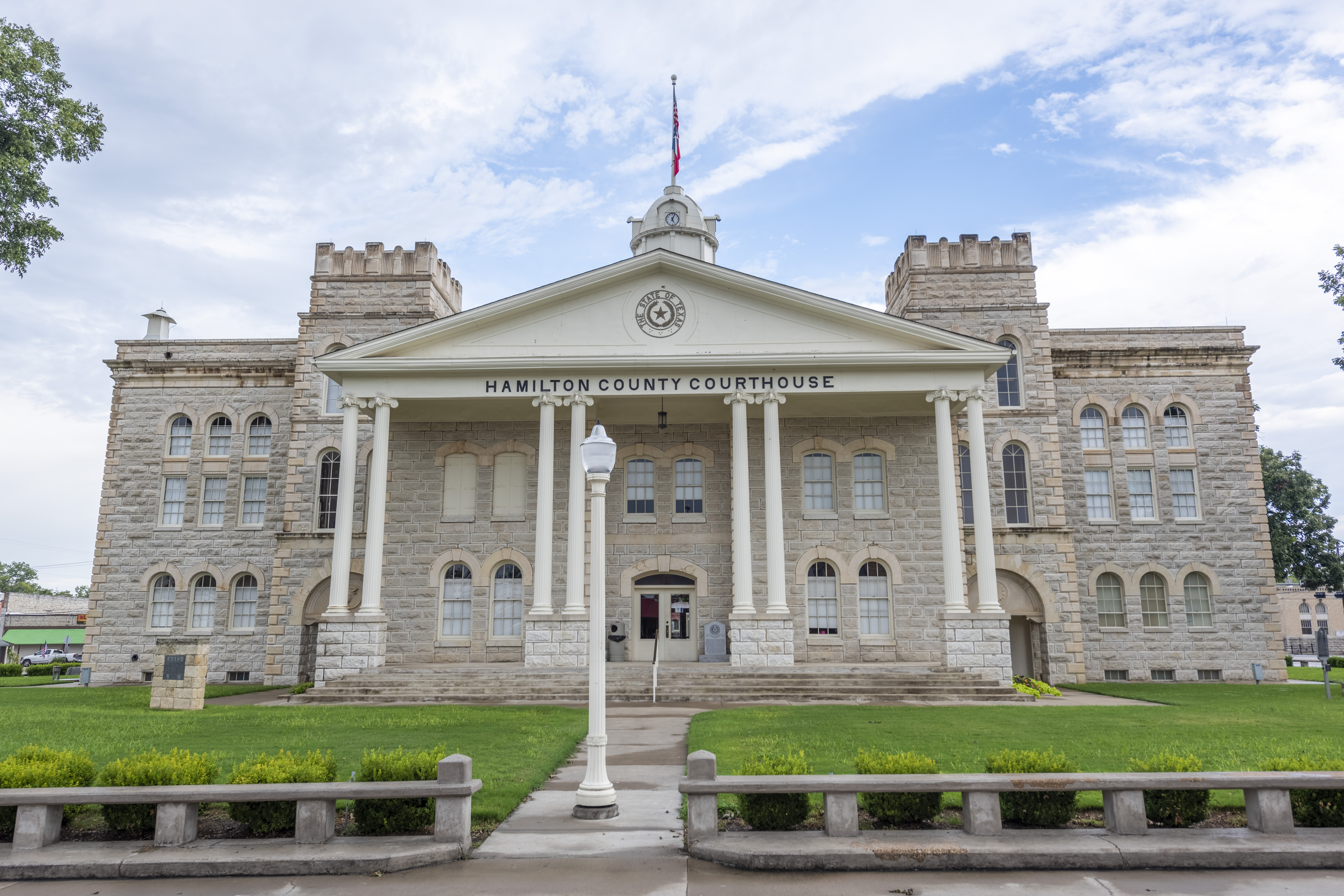
- The Hamilton County Courthouse in Hamilton, Texas. The building was added to the National Register of Historic Places on September 4, 1980.

- Location within the U.S. state of Texas
- Coordinates: 31°42′N 98°07′W
- Country: United States
- State: Texas
- Founded: 1858
- Named for: James Hamilton Jr.
- Seat: Hamilton
- Largest city: Hamilton

Area
  - Total: 836 sq mi (2,170 km^{2})
  - Land: 836 sq mi (2,170 km^{2})
  - Water: 0.5 sq mi (1.3 km^{2}) 0.06%

Population (2020)
  - Total: 8,222
  - Estimate (2025): 8,680 ▲
  - Density: 9.83/sq mi (3.80/km^{2})
- Time zone: UTC−6 (Central)
  - Summer (DST): UTC−5 (CDT)
- Congressional district: 31st
- Website: www.hamiltoncountytx.gov

Hamilton County is a county located on the Edwards Plateau in the U.S. state of Texas. As of the 2020 census, its population was 8,222. The county seat is Hamilton. The county was created in 1858 and named for James Hamilton Jr., a former governor of South Carolina who gave financial aid to the Republic of Texas.

== History ==
Indigenous peoples were the first inhabitants of the area. Later Native American tribes settled in the area, including Tawakoni, Tonkawa, Waco, and Comanche. In 1821, shortly after Mexico claimed its independence from Spain, Anglo settlers from the north came to Texas, claiming Mexican citizenship.

Following Texas's independence from Mexico (1836) and its annexation by the United States (1845), Robert Carter and family became the first permanent White settlers in the county in 1854. The next year, settlers James Rice, Henry Standefer, Frederic Bookerman, William Beauchamp, and Asa Langford formed a community that later became the town of Hamilton. Asa Langford began Langford's Cove, which later grew into present-day Evant. In 1858, the Sixth Texas Legislature formed Hamilton County, named after James Hamilton Jr., from parts of Comanche, Bosque, and Lampasas Counties. In 1858, Hamilton was named the county seat.

Despite growing White settlements in Texas, Indian tribal presences remained. In 1867, Comanche raiders attacked a school where Ann Whitney was the teacher. She helped students escape before finally succumbing to 18 Comanche arrows.

In 1882, the Hico community initiated the annual Hico Old Settlers' Reunion.

By 1900, cotton cultivation had spread to almost 47,500 acres (192 km^{2}) of county land. By 1907, the Stephenville North and South Texas Railway had connected Hamilton with Stephenville. The St. Louis Southwestern Railway of Texas connected Hamilton with Gatesville and Comanche in 1911.

In 1934, the Civil Works Administration's payroll included 747 Hamilton County men, who together earned about $2,000 per day.

In 1950, Ollie P. Roberts (also known as Ollie L. Roberts, "Brushy Bill" Roberts, or William Henry Roberts), a resident of Hico during the late 1940s, claimed to have been the outlaw Billy the Kid. The assertion is based on a legend that Patrick F. Garrett helped Billy fake his own death. Hico Chamber of Commerce responded by opening a Billy the Kid Museum.

== Geography ==
According to the U.S. Census Bureau, the county has a total area of 836 square miles (2,170 km^{2}), of which 0.5 sq mi (1.3 km^{2}) (0.06%) is covered by water.

=== Major highways ===
- U.S. Highway 84
- U.S. Highway 281
- State Highway 6
- State Highway 22
- State Highway 36
- State Highway 220

=== Adjacent counties ===
- Erath County (north)
- Bosque County (northeast)
- Coryell County (southeast)
- Lampasas County (south)
- Mills County (southwest)
- Comanche County (northwest)

== Demographics ==
Historical population
Census	Pop.	Note	%±
1860	489		—
1870	733		49.9%
1880	6,365		768.3%
1890	6,313		−0.8%
1900	13,520		114.2%
1910	15,315		13.3%
1920	14,676		−4.2%
1930	13,523		−7.9%
1940	13,303		−1.6%
1950	10,660		−19.9%
1960	8,488		−20.4%
1970	7,198		−15.2%
1980	8,297		15.3%
1990	7,733		−6.8%
2000	8,229		6.4%
2010	8,517		3.5%
2020	8,222		−3.5%
2025 (est.)	8,680	▲	5.6%
U.S. Decennial Census; 1850–2010 2010 2020

=== 2020 census ===
As of the 2020 census, the county had a population of 8,222. The median age was 47.4 years, with 21.1% of residents under the age of 18 and 25.9% aged 65 or older. For every 100 females there were 96.9 males, and for every 100 females age 18 and over there were 93.2 males age 18 and over.

The racial makeup of the county was 86.8% White, 0.4% Black or African American, 0.6% American Indian and Alaska Native, 0.5% Asian, <0.1% Native Hawaiian and Pacific Islander, 4.1% from some other race, and 7.6% from two or more races. Hispanic or Latino residents of any race comprised 12.7% of the population.

<0.1% of residents lived in urban areas, while 100.0% lived in rural areas.

There were 3,365 households in the county, of which 27.1% had children under the age of 18 living in them. Of all households, 52.4% were married-couple households, 17.8% were households with a male householder and no spouse or partner present, and 24.6% were households with a female householder and no spouse or partner present. About 27.6% of all households were made up of individuals and 15.1% had someone living alone who was 65 years of age or older.

There were 4,331 housing units, of which 22.3% were vacant. Among occupied housing units, 74.4% were owner-occupied and 25.6% were renter-occupied. The homeowner vacancy rate was 3.1% and the rental vacancy rate was 15.9%.

=== Racial and ethnic composition ===
Hamilton County, Texas – Racial and ethnic composition Note: the US Census treats Hispanic/Latino as an ethnic category. This table excludes Latinos from the racial categories and assigns them to a separate category. Hispanics/Latinos may be of any race.
Race / Ethnicity (NH = Non-Hispanic)	Pop 1980	Pop 1990	Pop 2000	Pop 2010	Pop 2020	% 1980	% 1990	% 2000	% 2010	% 2020
White alone (NH)	8,079	7,284	7,498	7,495	6,805	97.37%	94.19%	91.12%	88.00%	82.77%
Black or African American alone (NH)	0	2	11	38	32	0.00%	0.03%	0.13%	0.45%	0.39%
Native American or Alaska Native alone (NH)	13	19	34	31	37	0.16%	0.25%	0.41%	0.36%	0.45%
Asian alone (NH)	16	24	12	31	36	0.19%	0.31%	0.15%	0.36%	0.44%
Native Hawaiian or Pacific Islander alone (NH)	x	x	4	1	2	x	x	0.05%	0.01%	0.02%
Other race alone (NH)	12	1	1	3	17	0.14%	0.01%	0.01%	0.04%	0.21%
Mixed race or Multiracial (NH)	x	x	59	55	248	x	x	0.72%	0.65%	3.02%
Hispanic or Latino (any race)	177	403	610	863	1,045	2.13%	5.21%	7.41%	10.13%	12.71%
Total	8,297	7,733	8,229	8,517	8,222	100.00%	100.00%	100.00%	100.00%	100.00%

=== 2010 census ===
As of the 2010 census, about 2.9 same-sex couples per 1,000 households lived in the county.

=== 2000 census ===
As of the 2000 census, 8,229 people, 3,374 households, and 2,324 families were residing in the county. The population density was 10 people per square mile (3.9 people/km^{2}). The 4,455 housing units had an average density of five per square mile. The racial makeup of the county was 93.81% White, 0.15% African American, 0.44% Native American, 0.15% Asian, 0.05%Pacific Islander, 4.36% from other races, and 1.05% from two or more races. About 7.41% of the population were Hispanic or Latino of any race.

Of the 3,374 households, 27.4% had children under 18 living with them, 58.2% were married couples living together, 7.7% had a female householder with no husband present, and 31.1% were not families. About 28.4% of all households were made up of individuals, and 17.4% had someone living alone who was 65 or older. The average household size was 2.37 and the average family size was 2.89. In the county, the age distribution was 23.8% under the age of 18, 6.0% from 18 to 24, 22.9% from 25 to 44, 23.8% from 45 to 64, and 23.6% who were 65 years of age or older. The median age was 43 years. For every 100 females, there were 93.5 males. For every 100 females 18 and over, there were 87.1 males.

The median income for a household in the county was $31,150, and for a family was $39,494. Males had a median income of $26,703 versus $20,192 for females. The per capita income for the county was $16,800. About 10.6% of families and 14.2% of the population were below the poverty line, including 21.2% of those under 18 and 13.8% of those 65 or over.

== Notable person ==
- Brushy Bill, the man who claimed to be the infamous outlaw, Billy the Kid, died in Hico, Texas and is buried in Hamilton County. -->

== Media ==
Hamilton County is currently listed as part of the Dallas-Fort Worth designated market area. Local media outlets include: KDFW-TV, KXAS-TV, WFAA-TV, KTVT-TV, KERA-TV, KTXA-TV, KDFI-TV, KDAF-TV, and KFWD-TV. Because the county is located in Central Texas and neighbors the Killeen-Temple-Fort Hood metropolitan statistical area, all of the Waco/Temple/Killeen market stations also provide coverage for Hamilton County. They include: KCEN-TV, KWTX-TV, KXXV-TV, KWKT-TV, KNCT (TV), and KAKW-DT.

== Communities ==
=== Cities ===
- Cranfills Gap (mostly in Bosque County)
- Hamilton (county seat)
- Hico

=== Town ===
- Evant (partly in Coryell County)

=== Census-designated place ===
- Carlton

=== Unincorporated communities ===
- Aleman
- Fairy
- Gentry's Mill
- Indian Gap
- Jonesboro (also in Coryell County)
- Olin
- Pottsville
- Shive
- Whiteway

=== Ghost Town ===
- McGirk

== Education ==
School districts include:

- Cranfills Gap Independent School District
- Evant Independent School District
- Goldthwaite Consolidated Independent School District
- Hamilton Independent School District
- Hico Independent School District
- Jonesboro Independent School District

Hamilton County is in the service area, defined by the Texas Education Code, of Central Texas College.

== Gallery ==
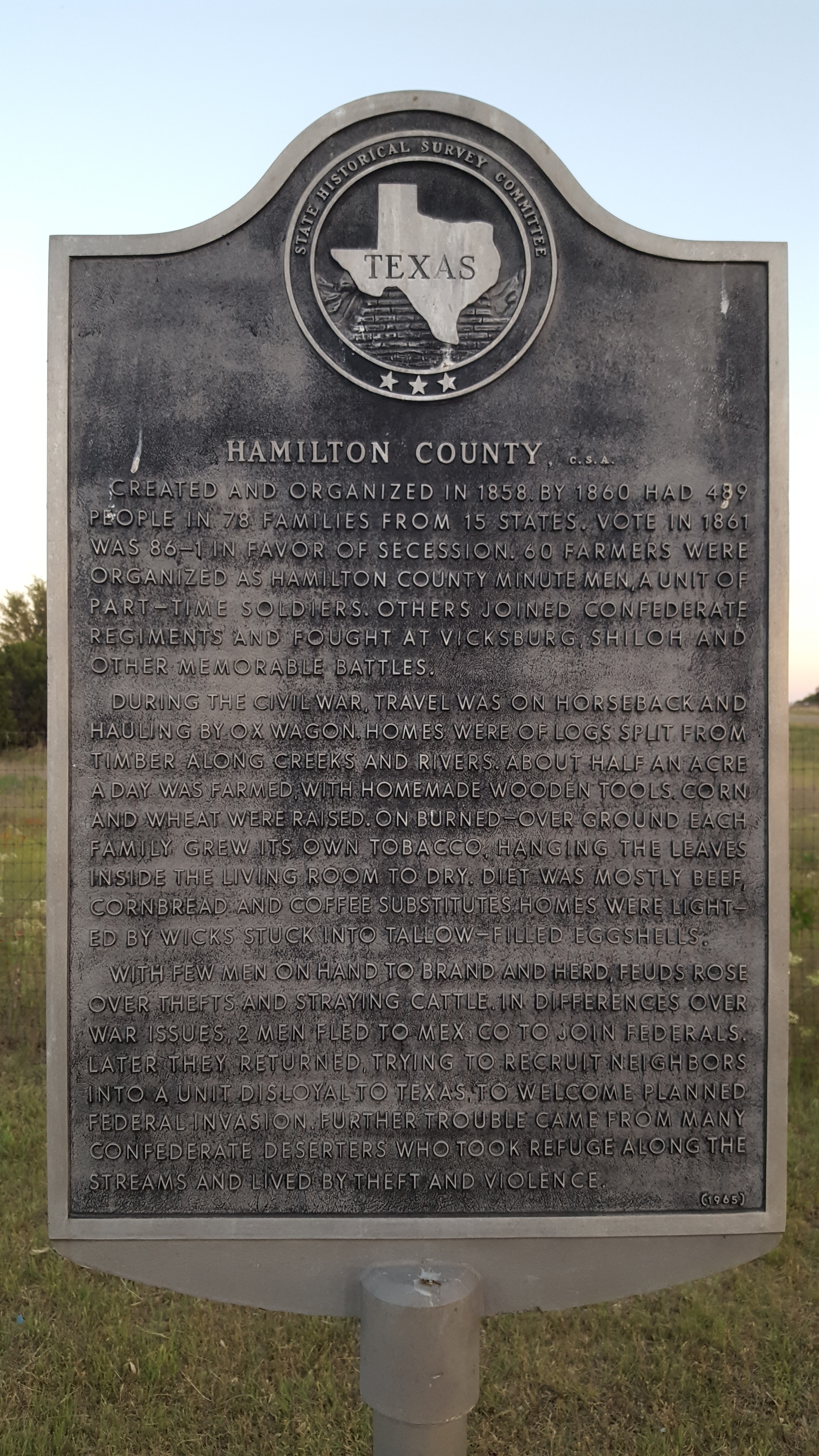
Hamilton County historical marker

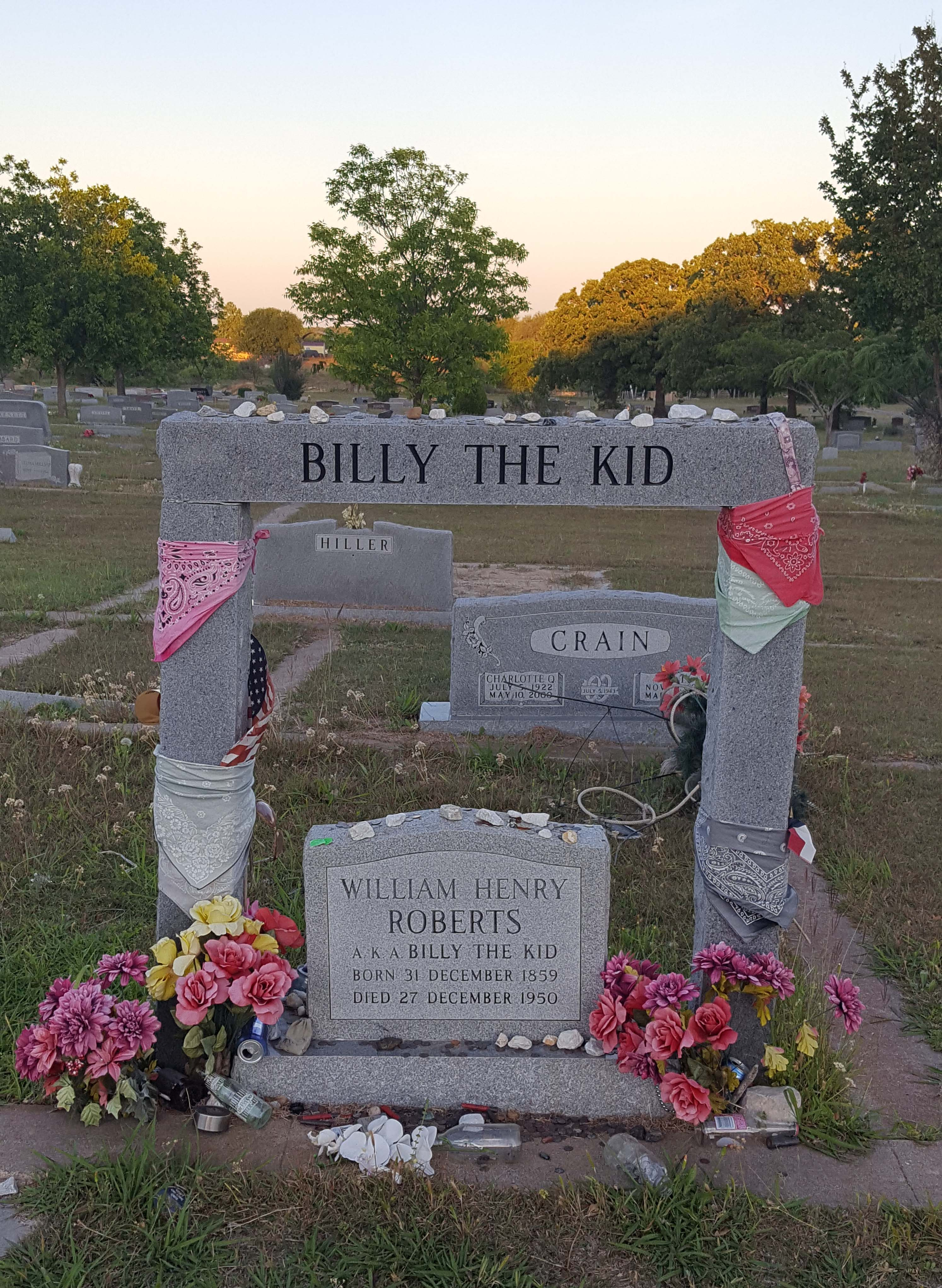
Gravestone of Brushy Bill Roberts, who claimed to be Billy the Kid

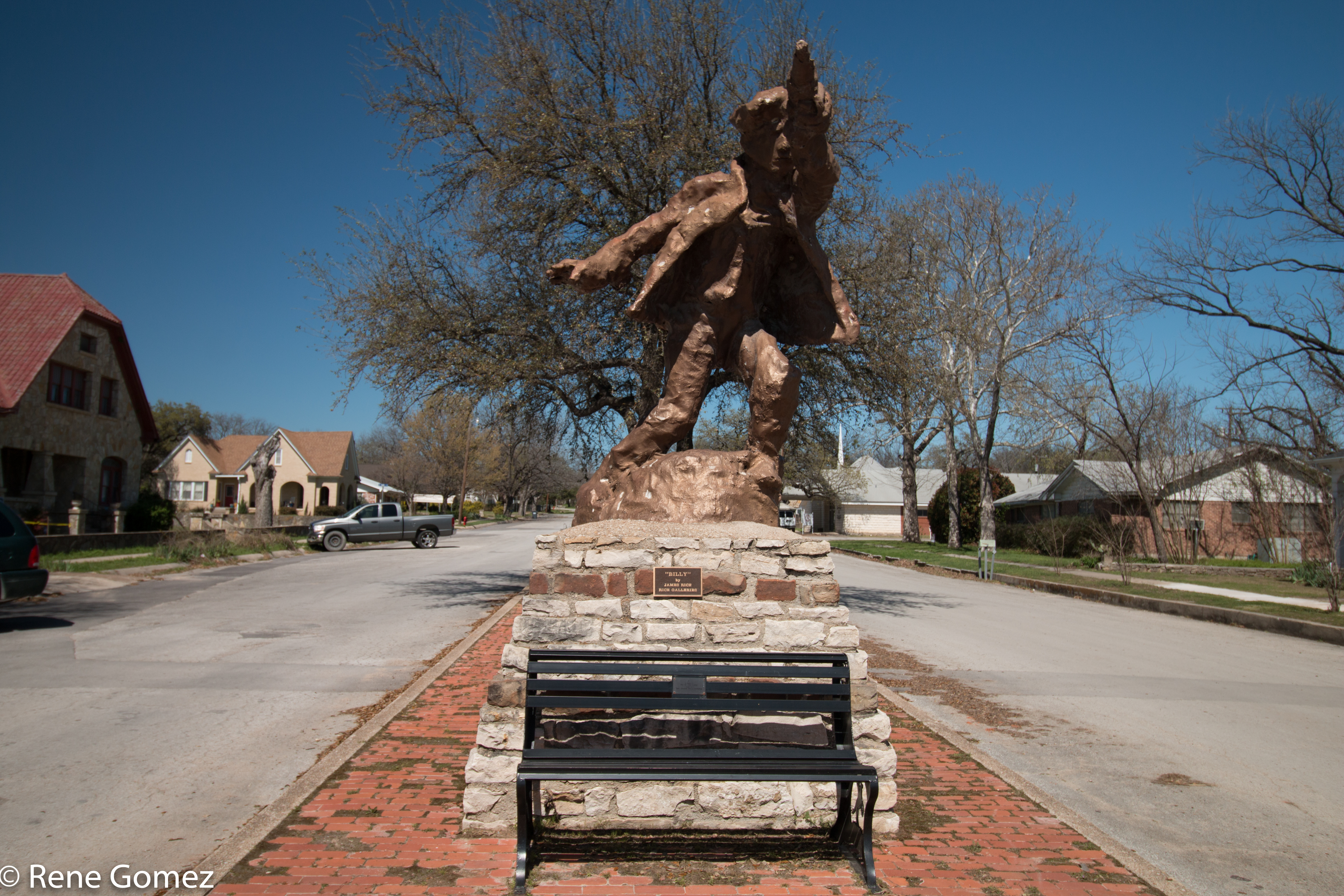
Billy the Kid statue in Hico

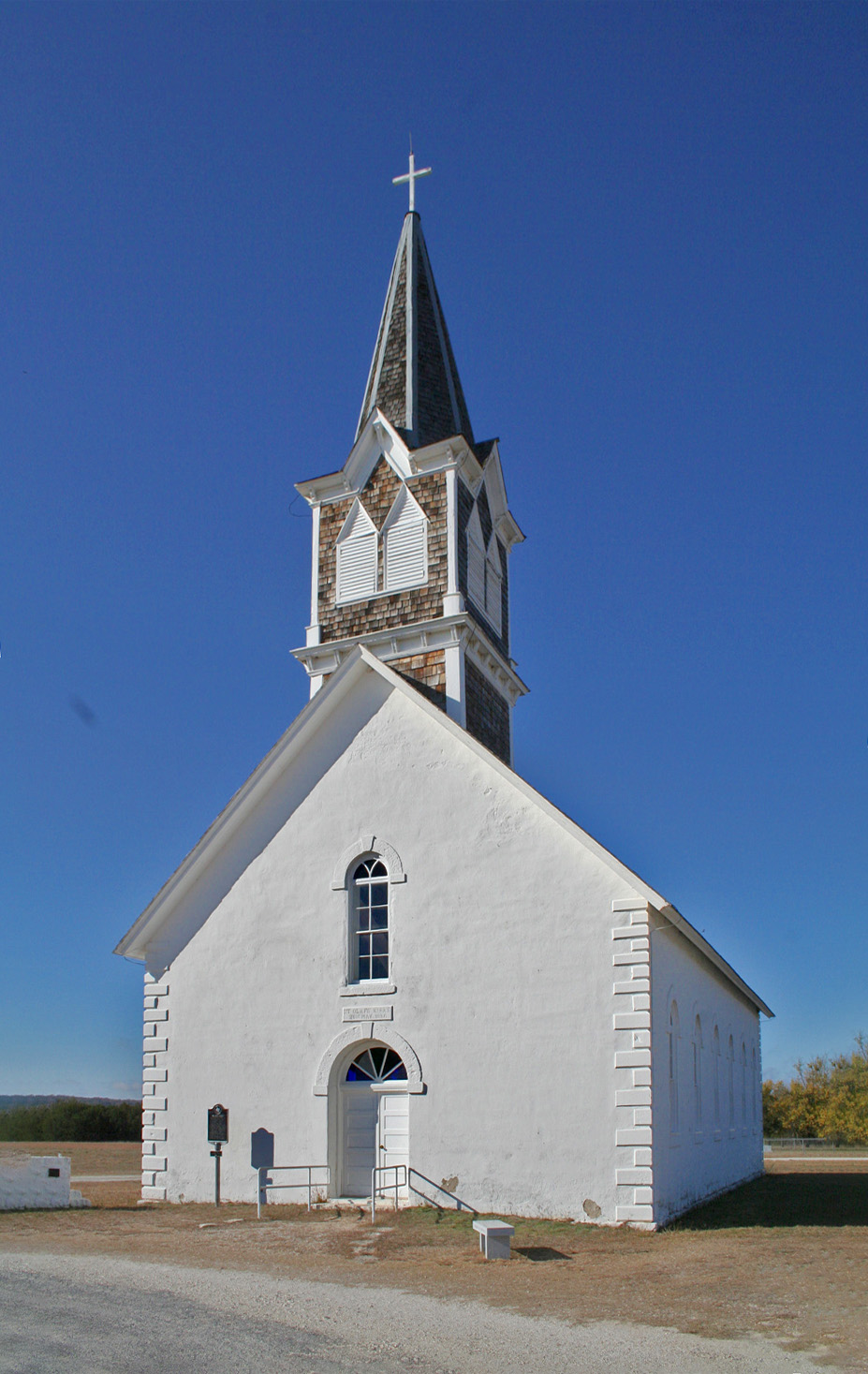
St. Olaf Kirke, just outside of Cranfills Gap

== Politics ==
United States presidential election results for Hamilton County, Texas
Year	Republican		Democratic		Third party(ies)	
Year	No.	%	No.	%	No.	%
1912	67	5.42%	992	80.26%	177	14.32%
1916	201	13.76%	1,231	84.26%	29	1.98%
1920	422	25.24%	1,075	64.29%	175	10.47%
1924	202	8.68%	2,035	87.45%	90	3.87%
1928	927	48.38%	989	51.62%	0	0.00%
1932	164	6.21%	2,474	93.64%	4	0.15%
1936	202	9.47%	1,929	90.48%	1	0.05%
1940	655	22.42%	2,263	77.45%	4	0.14%
1944	344	13.77%	1,790	71.63%	365	14.61%
1948	478	20.44%	1,725	73.75%	136	5.81%
1952	2,130	61.77%	1,313	38.08%	5	0.15%
1956	1,709	60.11%	1,124	39.54%	10	0.35%
1960	1,592	58.17%	1,136	41.51%	9	0.33%
1964	1,006	32.92%	2,048	67.02%	2	0.07%
1968	1,266	44.67%	1,116	39.38%	452	15.95%
1972	1,931	73.79%	685	26.18%	1	0.04%
1976	1,176	36.88%	1,981	62.12%	32	1.00%
1980	1,683	51.52%	1,526	46.71%	58	1.78%
1984	2,118	65.01%	1,130	34.68%	10	0.31%
1988	1,718	55.67%	1,355	43.91%	13	0.42%
1992	1,232	37.80%	1,100	33.75%	927	28.44%
1996	1,493	49.26%	1,200	39.59%	338	11.15%
2000	2,447	72.48%	878	26.01%	51	1.51%
2004	2,856	76.57%	845	22.65%	29	0.78%
2008	2,876	76.12%	863	22.84%	39	1.03%
2012	2,918	82.15%	591	16.64%	43	1.21%
2016	3,060	84.53%	479	13.23%	81	2.24%
2020	3,616	83.11%	641	14.73%	94	2.16%
2024	3,809	85.31%	625	14.00%	31	0.69%

United States Senate election results for Hamilton County, Texas1
Year	Republican		Democratic		Third party(ies)	
Year	No.	%	No.	%	No.	%
2024	3,699	82.68%	679	15.18%	96	2.15%

United States Senate election results for Hamilton County, Texas2
Year	Republican		Democratic		Third party(ies)	
Year	No.	%	No.	%	No.	%
2020	3,574	83.23%	594	13.83%	126	2.93%

Texas Gubernatorial election results for Hamilton County
Year	Republican		Democratic		Third party(ies)	
Year	No.	%	No.	%	No.	%
2022	3,006	86.48%	433	12.46%	37	1.06%

== See also ==
- National Register of Historic Places listings in Hamilton County, Texas
- Recorded Texas Historic Landmarks in Hamilton County
