= McGirk, Texas =

- Ghost town
- Location within Texas Location within the United States
- Coordinates: 31°31′05″N 98°19′53″W
- Country: United States
- State: Texas
- County: Hamilton
- Elevation: 1,398 ft (426 m)
- Time zone: UTC-6 (Central (CST))
  - Summer (DST): UTC-5 (CDT)
- GNIS feature ID: 2034980

McGirk is a ghost town located in Hamilton County near the Lampasas River in Central Texas, United States. Founded in the early 1870s, the town acquired a post office in 1882. John A. McGirk, the town's namesake, also served as the first postmaster. A steam-operated cotton gin on the Lampasas River remained in place for many years. The post office closed by 1920 and the school was gone by the mid-1930s. The town still had a population of 25 in 1945, but post war opportunities drew off that meager number and the town became a ghost.
