= Whiteway, Texas =

- Unincorporated community
- Location within Texas Location within the United States
- Coordinates: 31°38′35″N 97°58′18″W
- Country: United States
- State: Texas
- County: Hamilton
- Elevation: 1,014 ft (309 m)
- Time zone: UTC-6 (Central (CST))
  - Summer (DST): UTC-5 (CDT)
- Area code: 254
- GNIS feature ID: 1379270

Whiteway is an unincorporated community in Hamilton County, in the U.S. state of Texas. According to the Handbook of Texas, the community had a population of 10 in 2000.

== History ==
Whiteway was established to serve the needs of people driving from Jonesboro to Hamilton. There was a church, a cemetery, and several scattered houses in 1936. It had a population of 14 at one point, but it went down to only four in 1966. It was named for local settler Steve White and was originally known as Whitesboro. His sons owned and operated a gas station, a garage, a body shop, and a grocery store here. The community was listed on maps in the late 1980s and had a population of only 10 in 2000.

== Geography ==
Whiteway is located in southeastern Hamilton County.

== Education ==
Whiteway had a school in 1936. Today, the community is served by the Jonesboro Independent School District.
