= Hamilton County Courthouse (Texas) =

- U.S. National Register of Historic Places
- Texas State Antiquities Landmark
- Recorded Texas Historic Landmark
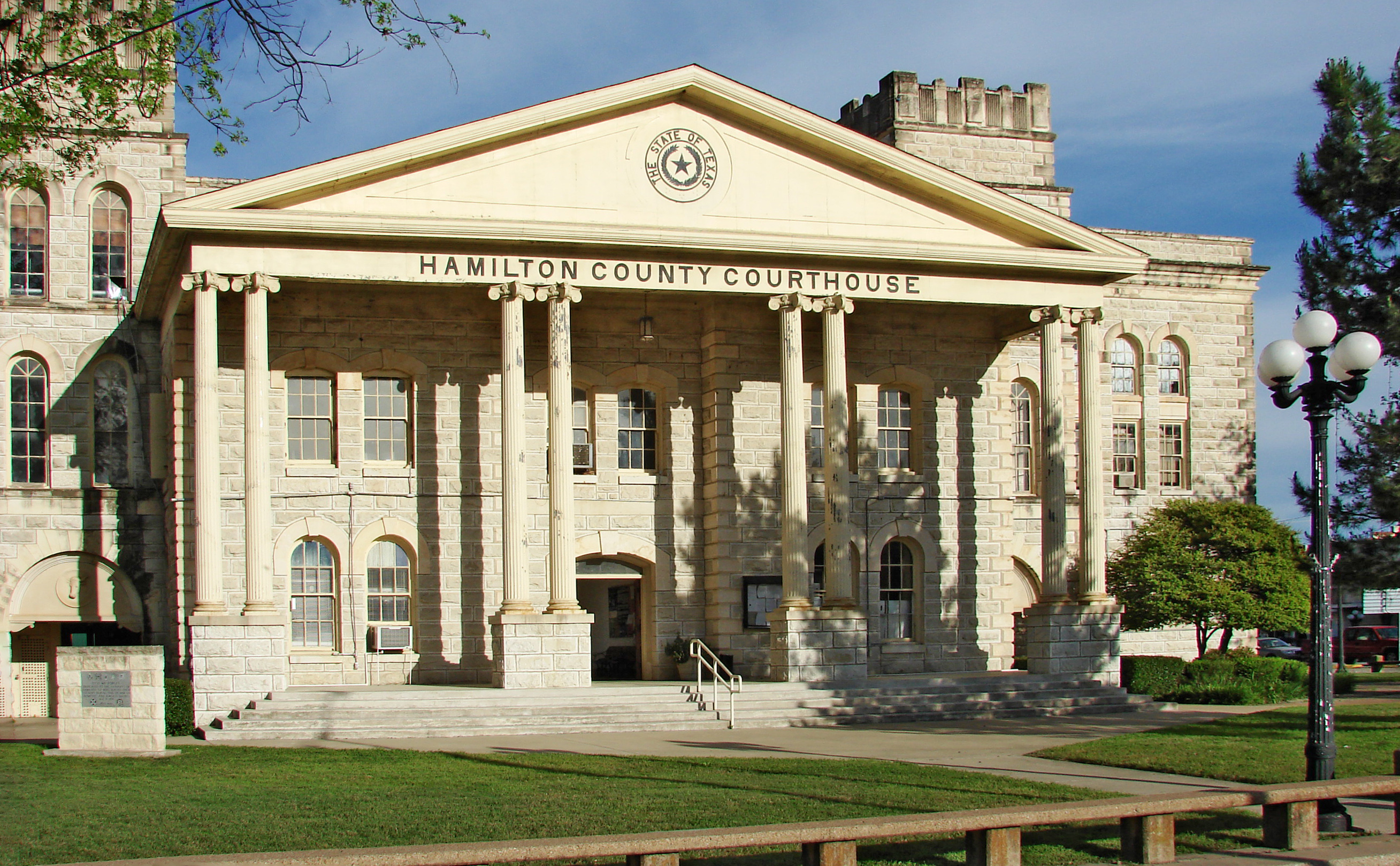
- Hamilton County Courthouse in 2008

- Location within Texas Location within the United States
- Location: Public Sq., Hamilton, Texas
- Coordinates: 31°42′13″N 98°7′23″W
- Area: 3 acres (1.2 ha)
- Built: 1886-1887
- Built by: Lovell, Hood & McLeod
- Architect: Martin, Byrnes & Johnston
- Architectural style: Second Empire
- NRHP reference No.: 80004125
- TSAL No.: 8200000304
- RTHL No.: 2347

Significant dates
- Added to NRHP: September 4, 1980
- Designated TSAL: January 1, 1992
- Designated RTHL: 1967

The Hamilton County Courthouse in Hamilton, Texas was built in 1887. It was listed on the National Register of Historic Places in 1980. It has also been designated a State Antiquities Landmark and a Recorded Texas Historic Landmark.

The 1887 building was Second Empire in style.

The building was enlarged during 1931–1932, according to plans by E. M. Miles. This added wings to the north and south, and it added pedimented porticos to the east and west.

== See also ==
- National Register of Historic Places listings in Hamilton County, Texas
- Recorded Texas Historic Landmarks in Hamilton County
- List of county courthouses in Texas
