= Mary Billings =

American educator (1776–1826)

Mary Billings (1776–1826) was an educator who founded one of the earliest integrated schools in the United States. While living in Georgetown, Billings, an English immigrant, opened an integrated school in 1807 that served both black and white students. The school was closed after complaints from neighbors. Billings then opened a school for black children in 1810. The Billings' school was located in Georgetown at 3100 Dumbarton Street and was open until her death in 1826.
