= Mary C. Billings =

Texas' first woman Universalist minister (1842-1904)

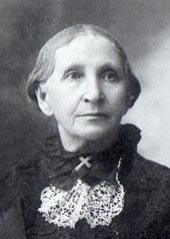
- Born: Mary Charlotte Ward; July 12, 1824; Litchfield, Connecticut, U.S.
- Died: March 2, 1904 (aged 79); Hico, Texas, U.S.
- Resting place: Hico Cemetery
- Occupations: evangelist; missionary; writer
- Spouse(s): Frederick Granniss (m. 1845; died 1866); Charles Henry Webster (m. 1869; died 1877); James Billings (m. 1885; died 1898);
- Writing career
- Pen name: M. C. G.; Mrs. M. C. Granniss
- Notable works: Emma Clermert; The Wonderful Christmas Tree

Mary C. Billings (née, Ward; after first marriage, Granniss; after second marriage, Webster; after third marriage, Billings; pen names, M.C.G., Mrs. M.C. Granniss; July 12, 1824 – March 2, 1904) was an American evangelist, missionary, and writer. She was Texas' first ordained woman minister of the Universalist faith. Though Billings largely gave her life to clerical work, she displayed great activity in other fields. She wrote two works of fiction, Emma Clermert (1850) and The Wonderful Christmas Tree (1882). While abroad, she wrote "Thitherside Sketches," which were published serially in Ladies' Repository, a Boston monthly, running through two years of that publication. Billings was also a prolific writer of prose and verse for northern journals and periodicals, denominational and secular. From these productions, certain works were included in anthologies compiled by others, including Poets and Poetry of Printerdom, Women in Sacred Song, and Our Women Workers. Billings was a member of The Texas Woman's Press Association, and of The Woman's State Council. Widowed three times, she had no children.

== Early life and education ==
Mary Charlotte Ward was born in Litchfield, Connecticut, on July 12, 1824. Her father was William Ward. William's grandfather, Rev. Solomon Palmer, a Presbyterian minister, was educated at Old Yale.

Billings was not systematically educated. For the older children of the family, her parents were anxious that they should receive the best education, and encouraged them to work hard, until the health of several failed, and they died. With Billings, they took the other extreme; and she was allowed plenty of books, but freedom from all schoolroom restraints, and time to exercise in the open air. Her first published poem was written at the age of 12.

== Career ==
=== Granniss ===
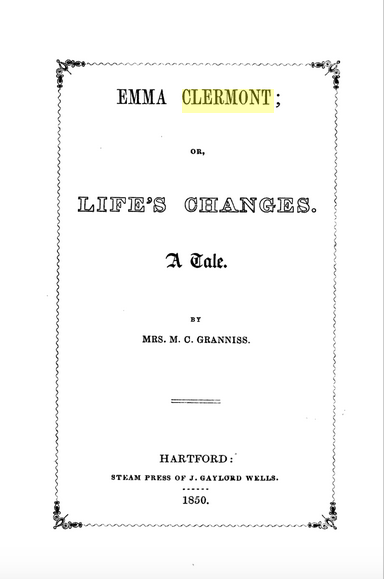
Emma Clermont

In 1845, Billings married Frederick Granniss, also of Litchfield, who was a wealthy silk merchant. They moved to Hartford, Connecticut, and joined the Hartford Universalist congregation. The years 1859–60, she traveled abroad with him, and put the result of her experiences and observations into a series of letters called "Thither-Side Sketches" for Ladies' Repository. After returning from their foreign trip, they built a suburban home, known as "Lilfred's Rest." Here, for several years, she led a happy, quiet, intellectual life, reading what she enjoyed, and writing when the spirit moved her. Her first book, Emma Clermont was published in 1849. The poor health of Frederick precipitated a move to Turpentine Camp in the pine forests of Alabama with the hope for an improvement in Frederick's health. Her letters from the forest of Alabama were instructive and entertaining. "Bear Ye One Another's Burdens" was a touching poem, containing a whole sermon. They eventually returned to Hartford where Frederick died in 1866.

=== Webster ===
In 1869, the widow married the Universalist minister and publisher, Rev. Charles Henry Webster. She assisted her husband in his pulpit ministry as a lay preacher while Charles was performing missionary work. Though never ordained, she often back-filled for absent ministers. During this time, she was interested in every project for the welfare of women, including serving as Vice President of the Woman's Centenary Association for seven years, as well as writing prose and verse for the denominational periodical press. In 1877, Charles died. At some point of time in the 1870's, Mary took in her niece, Charlotte Henrietta Ward, daughter of her older brother, Henry Ward, after his death. Mary and her brother, Henry, were close as it was he who had converted to Universalism earlier and then influenced the conversion of Mary to the cause.

=== Billings ===
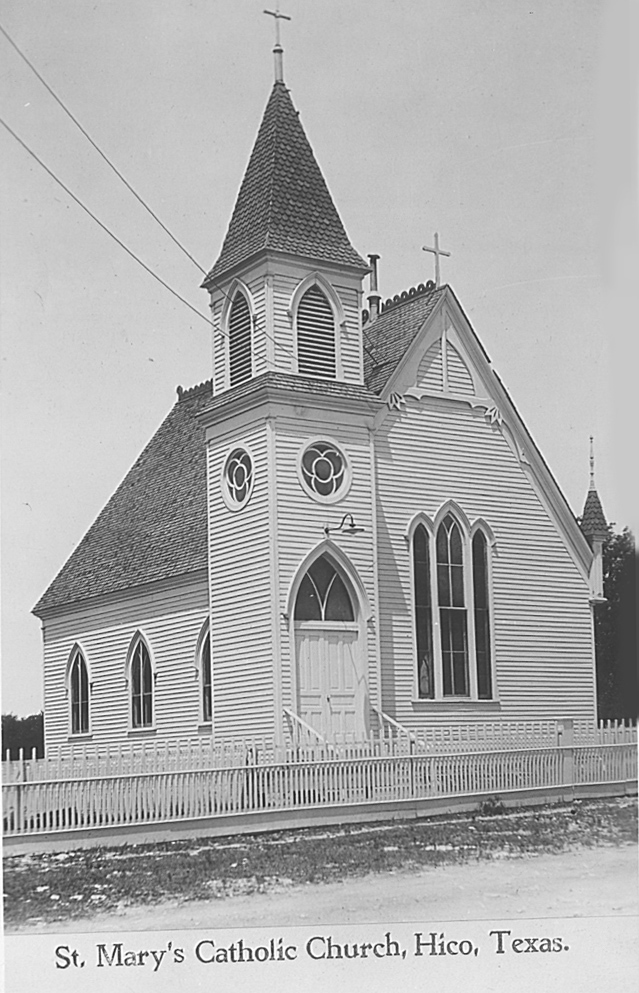
St. Mary's Catholic Church, formerly All Souls Universalist, in Hico TX.

In 1885, in Waco, Texas, she married Rev. James Billings, another Universalist minister and publisher. They settled in Hico, Texas, where she was licensed in 1886 and ordained as a Universalist minister on October 3, 1892. She was widowed again in 1898.

Mary Billings died March 2, 1904, in Hico, and is buried at Hico Cemetery.

== Selected works ==
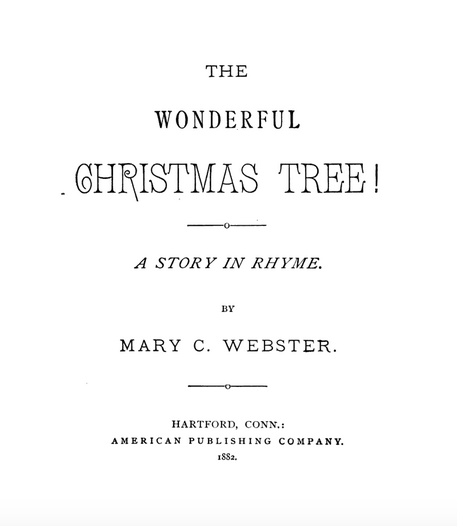
The Wonderful Christmas Tree

=== As Mrs. M. C. Granniss ===
- Emma Clermont; or, Life's changes. A tale., 1850
- Order of exercises at the dedication of the new Universalist Church, Hartford, Conn., November 1, 1860. , 1860

=== As Mary C. Webster ===
- The Wonderful Christmas Tree!: A Story in Rhyme
