= Stephenville North and South Texas Railway =

American railroad company

The Stephenville North & South Texas Railway (SN&ST) was incorporated in Texas on February 4, 1907, by Stephenville and Hamilton business interests. Its original standard gauge 43-mile line was built between Stephenville and Hamilton and completed in late 1907. The first train operated between Stephenville and Hamilton on Christmas Day 1907. Regular service began in January 1908. Four apparently identical wooden depots of a standard design were built at Hamilton, Carlton, Spurlin, and Alexander (where the Texas Central line of the Katy Railroad crossed). The SN&ST shared a Union Station with its original primary railroad connection, the long-established Fort Worth & Rio Grande Railroad at Stephenville.

A serious flood in April 1908 caused the owners of the line to seek a buyer. In January 1909, a half interest in the line was sold to Commonwealth Trust Company of St. Louis. The St. Louis Southwestern Railway of Texas (known as "the Cotton Belt Route") bought the railroad in April 1910. The charter of the SN&ST was amended on April 18, 1910 to permit extensions of the railroad from Hamilton to Gatesville, Texas; from Stephenville to Thurber, Texas; and from Edson, Texas to Comanche, Texas. However, the line from Stephenvile to Thurber was never built.

== Extensions ==
The Hamilton to Gatesville extension of 32 miles was built in 1910-1911, to establish a primary connection with the St. Louis Southwestern Railway at Gatesville. New brick stations of Cotton Belt design were built at Gatesville, Ireland, and Hamilton, with wooden depots at Levita and Aleman. The first train operated on this new line on February 15, 1911. The competing Temple Northwestern Railway sought a similar franchise and graded from Temple, Texas to Gatesville in 1910, with plans to build on to Hamilton and Comanche, but the SN&ST extensions were built first. The new 31-mile line from Edson, four miles north of Hamilton, to Comanche was completed in 1911 and the first train operated on September 3, 1911. A brick depot was built at Comanche, with wooden depots at Gustine, Lamkin, and Edson. Of note on this line was the spectacular curved Bear Creek Trestle, known on the line as Trestle #5, just west of Edson. The extensions of the SN&ST were built under contract with the firm of Thompson and Scott, based on a proposal. The northward extension to serve the bituminous coal mines at Thurber, Texas was never built.

== Leases ==
The SN&ST was leased to the St. Louis Southwestern Railway of Texas for operation starting on July 1, 1913, for a period of ten years. After the first 10-year lease, it was renewed for a period of two years five times. On October 17, 1934, all SN&ST trackage north of Hamilton was abandoned. The railroad was then leased by St. Louis Southwestern one more time, for six years, followed by an application to the Interstate Commerce Commission to abandon the SN&ST's remaining trackage between Hamilton and Gatesville in December 1939. Despite strong local opposition from Hamilton interests, this remaining trackage was abandoned on February 6, 1941, and was removed by August 1941.

== Motive Power ==
The first motive power on the line were two ten wheelers #50 and #51. These were known to be former Pennsylvania Railroad locomotives because of their Altoona Machine Shop builders plates. The two SN&ST locomotives were built in the mid-1870s by Altoona. They were retired in 1912-1913 and replaced with St. Louis Southwestern Railway locomotives. The most common types of St. Louis Southwestern steam locomotives used on the SN&ST lines were American and Mogul types. The St. Louis Southwestern General Electric motor cars were used for the passenger accommodation on the lines. Of note in the early days of the SN&ST were excursion trains powered by Santa Fe and Missouri Kansas Texas locomotives.
