= Hico Independent School District =

School district in Texas

Hico Independent School District is a public school district based in Hico, Texas (USA).

Located in Hamilton County, portions of the district extend into Bosque, Comanche, and Erath counties.

In 2009, the school district was rated "recognized" by the Texas Education Agency.

The total number of attendees for the secondary and elementary schools in 2024 was 643.

== History ==
Leon C. Murdoch was to become the superintendent effective July 1, 1983.

== Schools ==
- Hico Secondary (Grades 6-12)
- Hico Elementary (Grades PK-5)
