= Hico, Texas =

- City
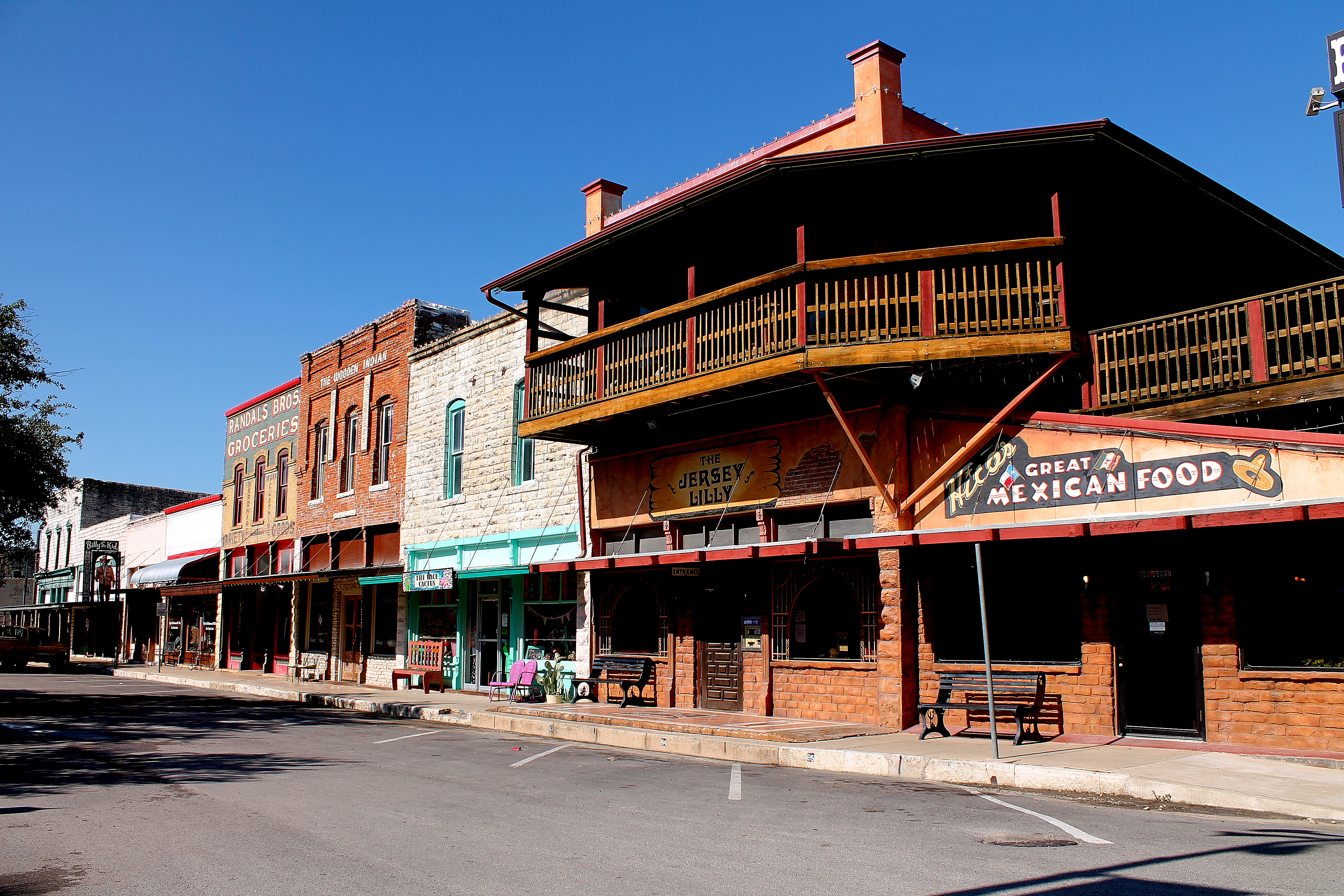
- Hico (2014)

- Location within Hamilton County and Texas
- Coordinates: 31°59′44″N 98°02′15″W
- Country: United States
- State: Texas
- Counties: Hamilton
- Incorporated: 1883

Area
  - Total: 1.83 sq mi (4.73 km^{2})
  - Land: 1.82 sq mi (4.72 km^{2})
  - Water: 0 sq mi (0.00 km^{2})
- Elevation: 1,060 ft (320 m)

Population (2020)
  - Total: 1,335
  - Density: 733/sq mi (283/km^{2})
- Time zone: UTC−6 (CST)
  - Summer (DST): UTC−5 (CDT)
- ZIP Code: 76457
- Area code: 254
- FIPS code: 48-33548
- GNIS ID: 2410754
- Website: hico-tx.com

Hico (/ˈhaɪkoʊ/, HY-koh) is a small city located in Hamilton County in central Texas, United States. Its population was 1,335 in the 2020 census, down from 1,341 in the 2010 census. Over the years, it became a cattle and cotton market. Today, ranching and tourism dominate the local economy.

== History ==
Named for its founder's hometown of Hico in southwestern Kentucky, Hico's original location was on Honey Creek. When the Texas Central line (part of the historic Katy Railroad) was built nearby, the citizens moved 2.5 miles (4.0 km) to the rail line. Hico was incorporated in 1883 and became the Hamilton County shipping center.

In 1903, Kentucky-based evangelist Mordecai Ham held the first of his 75 Texas revival meetings in Hico.

== Geography ==
Hico is located in the northern corner of Hamilton County. A small portion of the city extends north into Erath County. U.S. Route 281 passes through the city as Walnut Street and North 2nd Street. Highway 281 leads northwest 19 miles (31 km) to Stephenville and south 20 miles (32 km) to Hamilton, the county seat. Texas State Highway 6 passes through the city as Second Street, joining US 281 as it exits the city to the northwest. Highway 6 leads east 23 miles (37 km) to Meridian and west-northwest 21 miles (34 km) to Dublin.

According to the United States Census Bureau, Hico has a total area of 1.8 square miles (4.7 km^{2}), all land.

Approximately 1.8 miles (2.9 km) north of Hico are what appear to be the remains of an impact crater that was formed some time after the Cretaceous Period.

=== Climate ===
The climate in this area is characterized by hot, humid summers and generally mild to cool winters. According to the Köppen climate classification, Hico has a humid subtropical climate, Cfa on climate maps.

== Demographics ==
Historical population
Census	Pop.	Note	%±
1890	649		—
1900	1,480		128.0%
1910	1,427		−3.6%
1920	1,635		14.6%
1930	1,463		−10.5%
1940	1,242		−15.1%
1950	1,212		−2.4%
1960	1,020		−15.8%
1970	925		−9.3%
1980	1,375		48.6%
1990	1,342		−2.4%
2000	1,341		−0.1%
2010	1,379		2.8%
2020	1,335		−3.2%
U.S. Decennial Census

=== 2020 census ===
As of the 2020 census, Hico had a population of 1,335. The median age was 42.0 years; 23.9% of the residents were under 18 and 21.6% were 65 or older. The female/male ratio was 1:0.926 overall and 1:0.837 for those 18 and over.

None of the residents lived in urban areas, while 100.0% lived in rural areas.

Of the 518 households in Hico, 34.9% had children under 18 living in them, 45.6% were married-couple households, 17.0% were households with a male householder and no spouse or partner present, and 30.3% were households with a female householder and no spouse or partner present. About 29.9% of all households were made up of individuals, and 16.4% had someone living alone who was 65 or older.

The city had 648 housing units, of which 20.1% were vacant. The homeowner vacancy rate was 4.4% and the rental vacancy rate was 21.5%.

Racial composition as of the 2020 census
Race	Number	Percentage
White	1,090	81.6%
Black or African American	5	0.4%
American Indian and Alaska Native	8	0.6%
Asian	9	0.7%
Native Hawaiian and other Pacific Islander	1	0.1%
Some other race	99	7.4%
Two or more races	123	9.2%
Hispanic or Latino (of any race)	219	16.4%

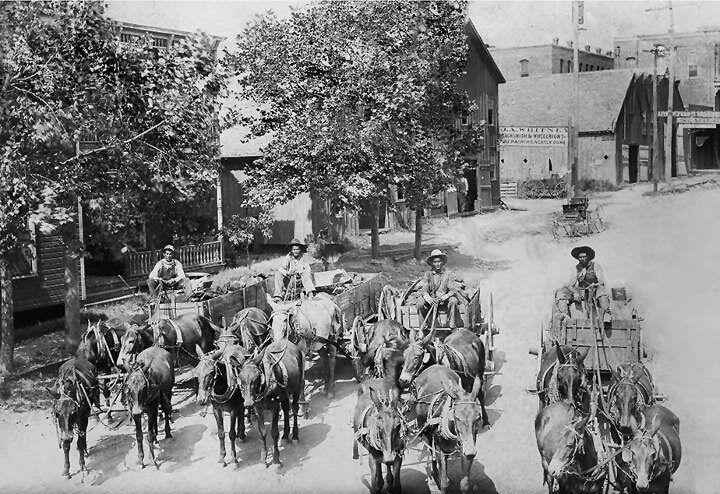
Downtown Hico, Texas wagon team, c. 1910

=== 2000 census ===
As of the 2000 census, 1,341 people, 556 households, and 363 families were residing in the city. The population density was 911.4 inhabitants per square mile (351.9/km^{2}). The 640 housing units had an average density of 435.0 per square mile (168.0/km^{2}). The racial makeup of the city was 90.23% White, 0.82% Native American, 0.15% Pacific Islander, 7.53% from other races, and 1.27% from two or more races. Hispanics or Latinos of any race were 11.26% of the population.

Of the 556 households, 30.8% had children under 18 living with them, 51.4% were married couples living together, 10.6% had a female householder with no husband present, and 34.7% were not families. About 31.5% of all households were made up of individuals, and 22.3% had someone living alone who was 65 or older. The average household size was 2.37, and the average family size was 2.99.

In the city, the age distribution was 26.2% under 18, 6.9% from 18 to 24, 23.8% from 25 to 44, 20.5% from 45 to 64, and 22.6% who were 65 or older. The median age was 40 years. For every 100 females, there were 82.9 males. For every 100 females 18 and over, there were 77.9 males.

The median income in the city for a household was $25,919 and for a family was $34,688. Males had a median income of $27,404 versus $17,708 for females. The per capita income for the city was $14,122. About 13.6% of families and 19.5% of the population were below the poverty line, including 27.2% of those under 18 and 22.4% of those 65 or over.

== Education ==
The city is served by the Hico Independent School District, home of the Hico Tigers and Lady Tigers.

== Notable people ==
- Mary Billings was Texas' first woman Universalist minister.
- William Garrison, Major General, U.S. Army, Ret., resides at his ranch near Hico.
- Mattie Parker, mayor of Fort Worth, Texas (2021–present), was born and raised in Hico.
- Brushy Bill Roberts (1879–1950), who claimed to be Billy the Kid, died in Hico.

== Gallery ==
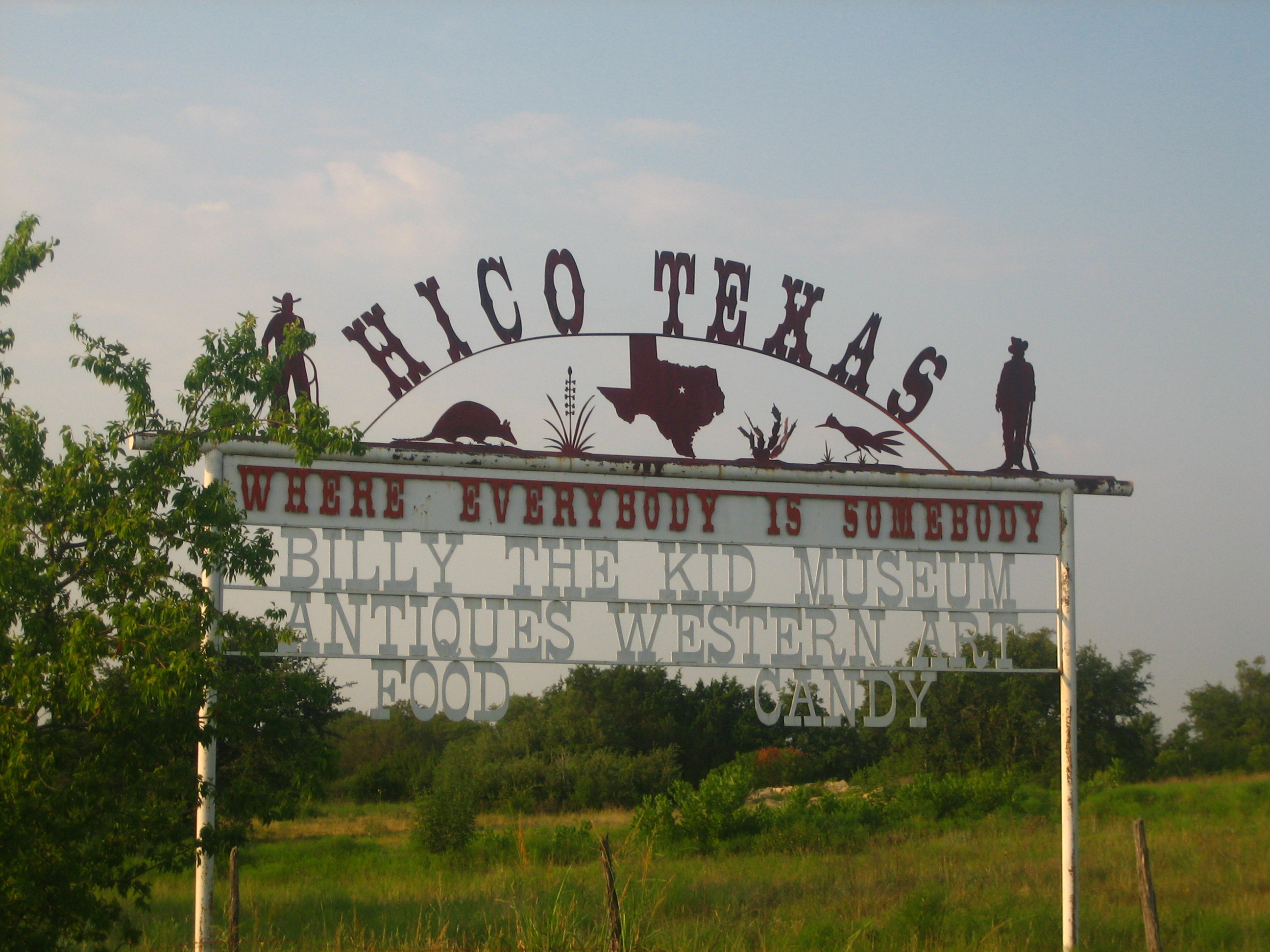
Hico, Texas: "Where Everybody Is Somebody"

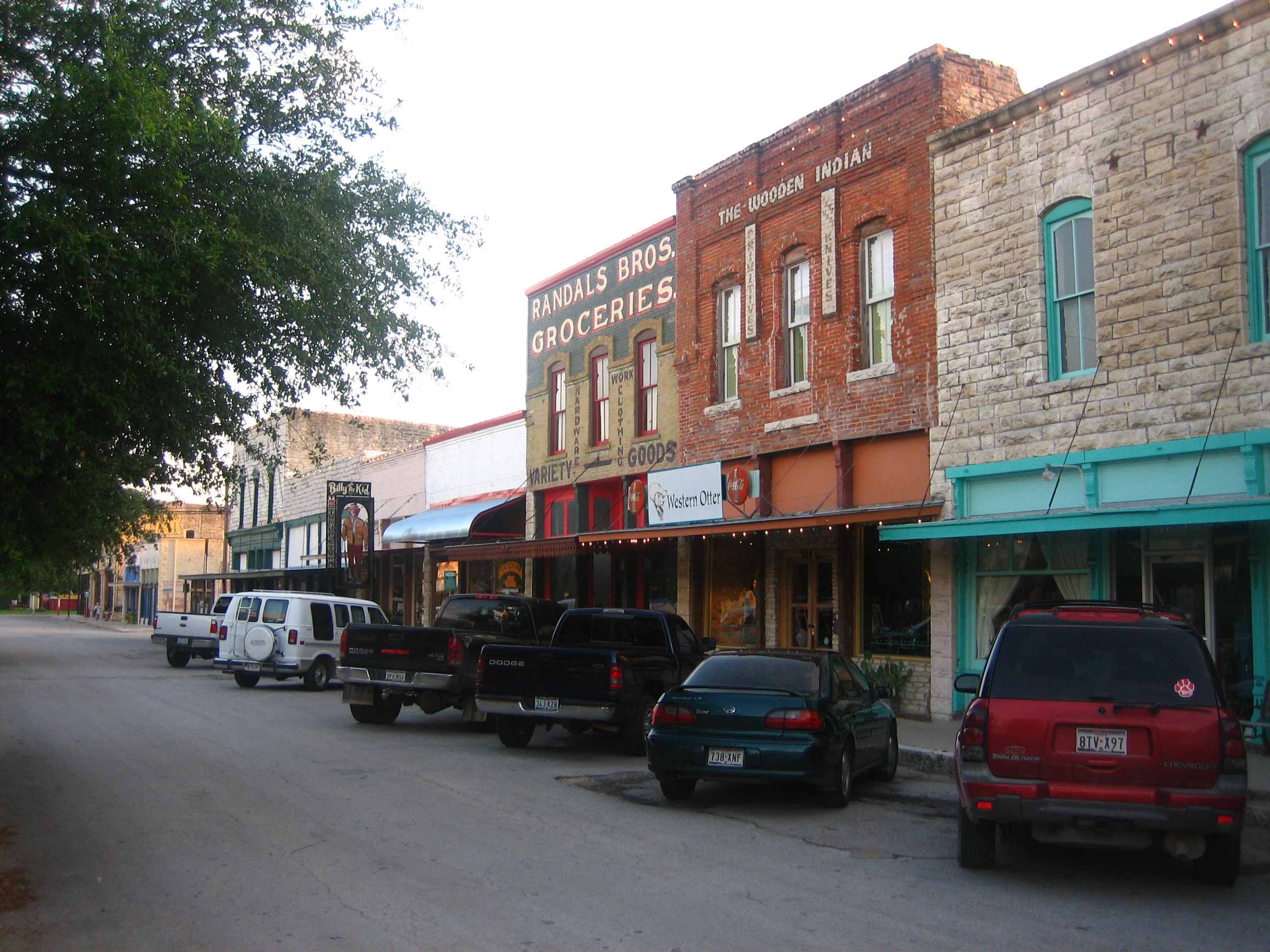
Historic district in Hico

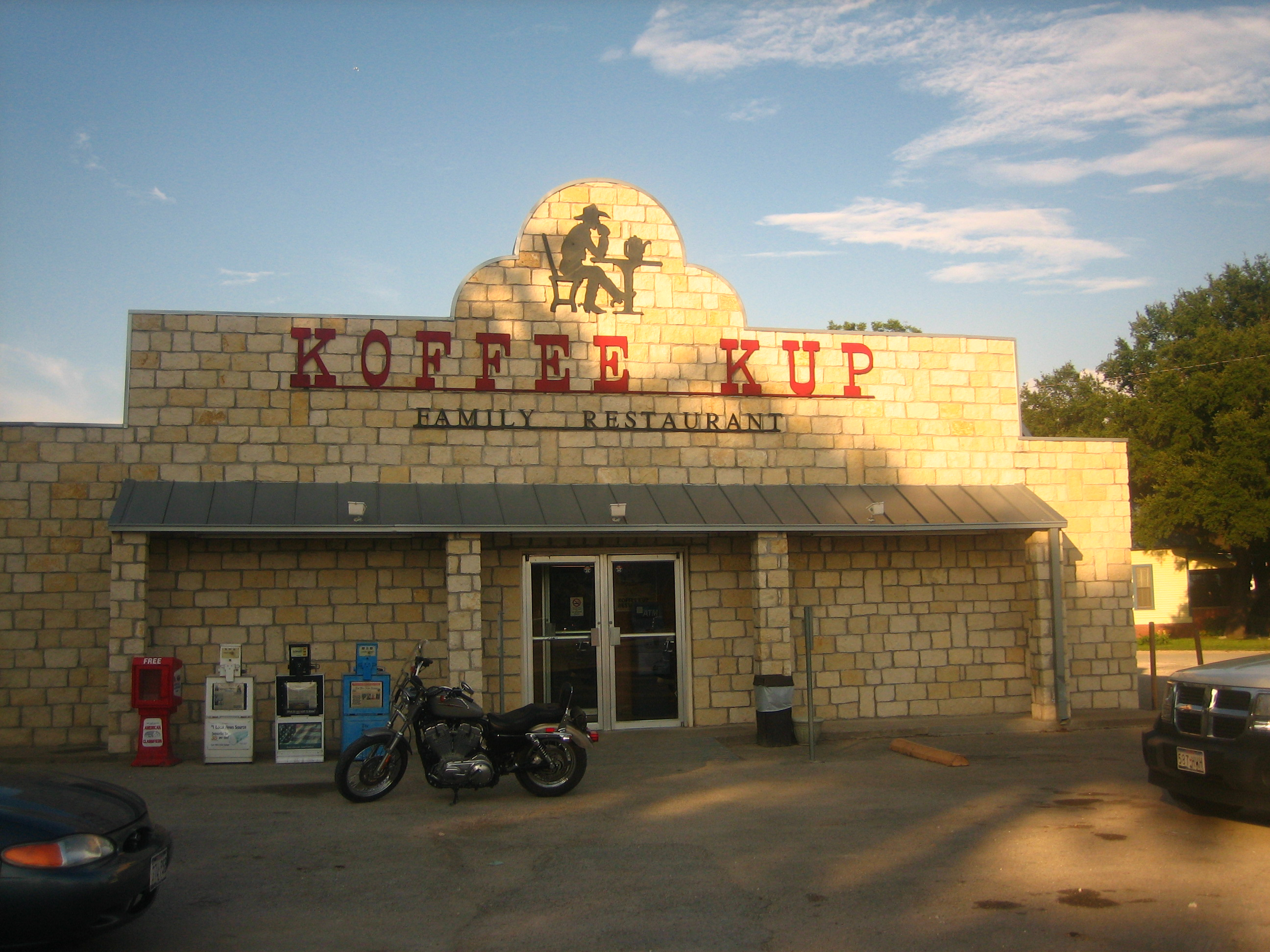
Koffee Kup Restaurant in Hico

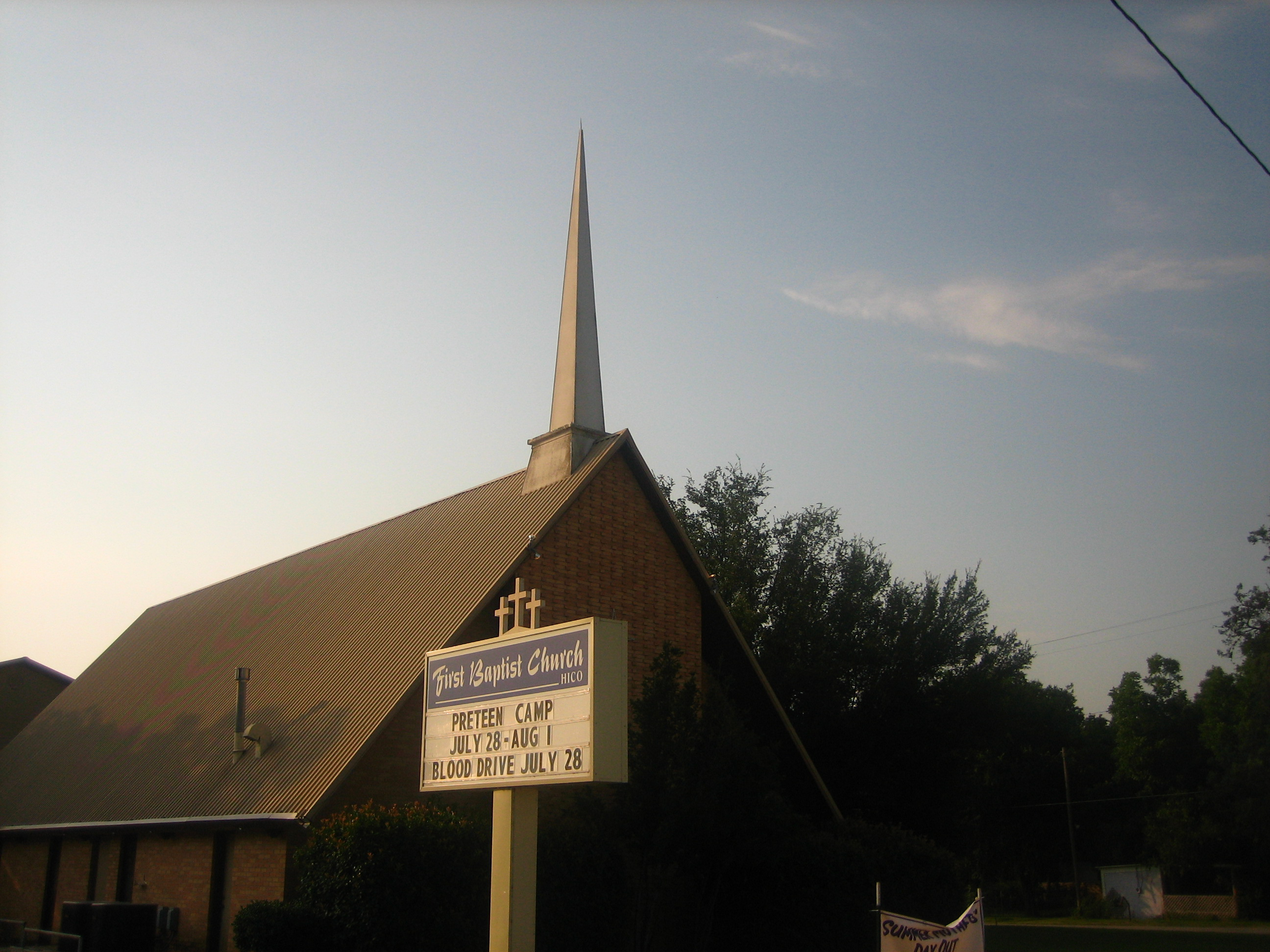
First Baptist Church of Hico on U.S. Highway 281 South

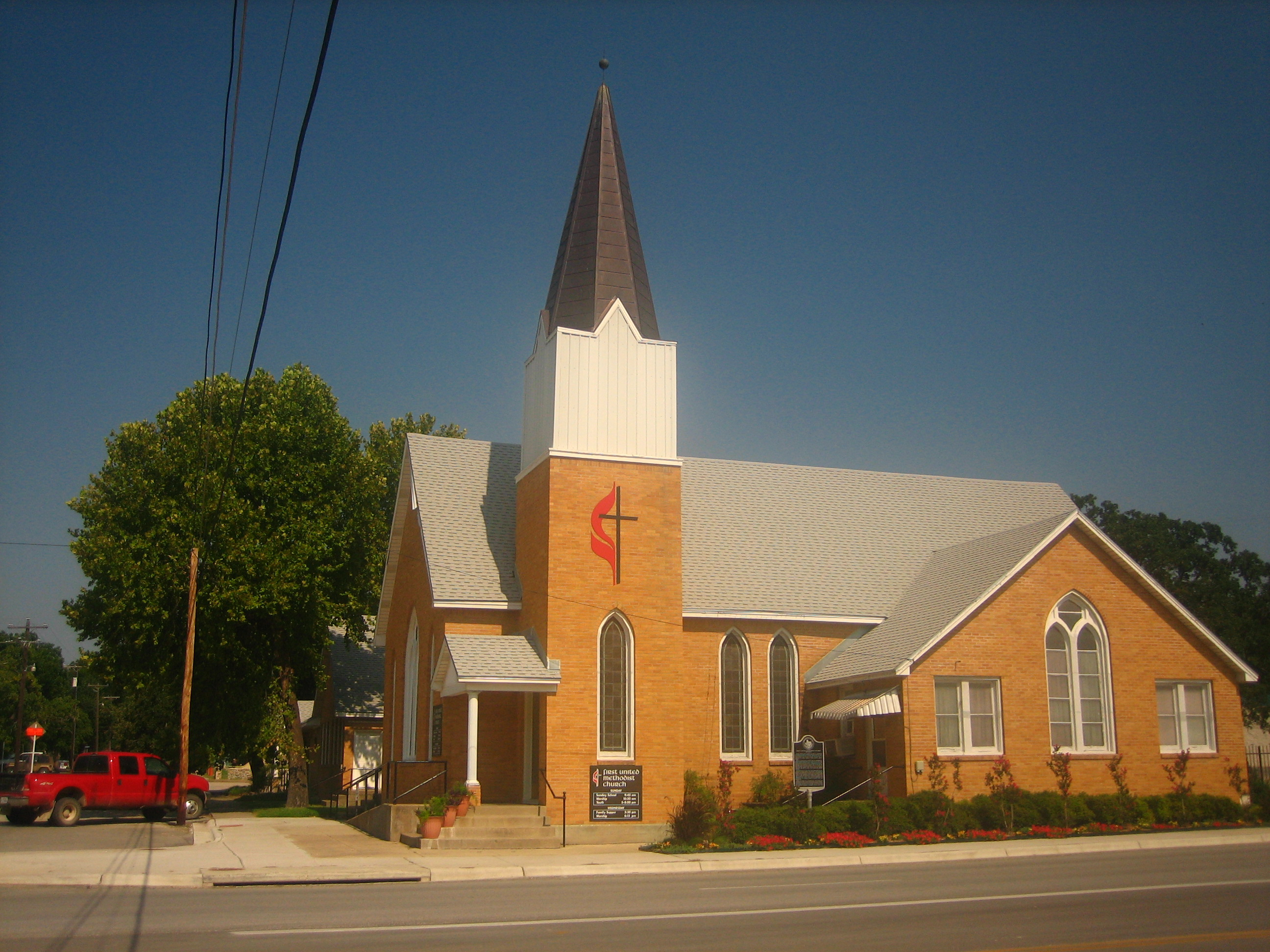
First United Methodist Church in Hico

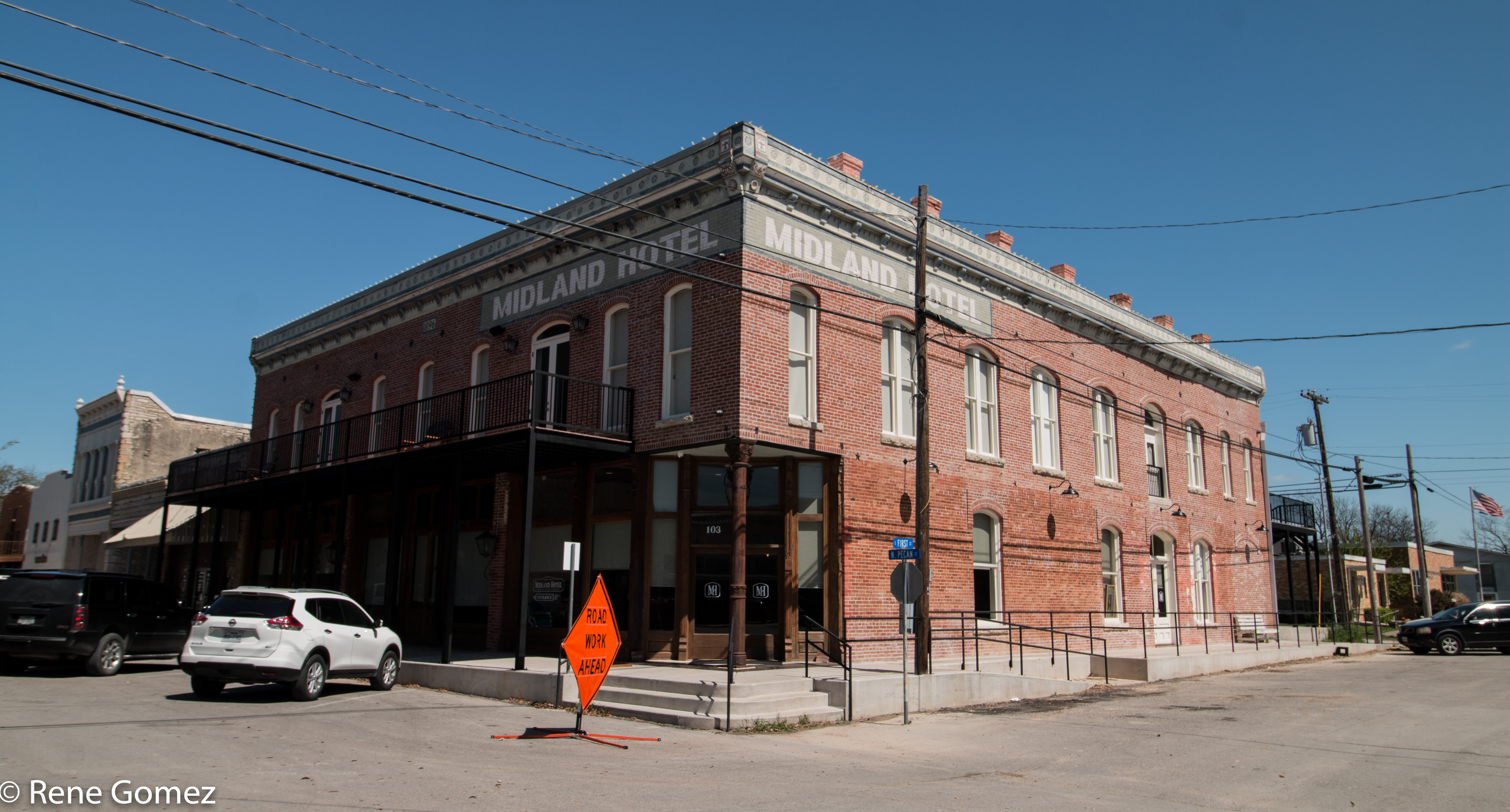
Midland Hotel

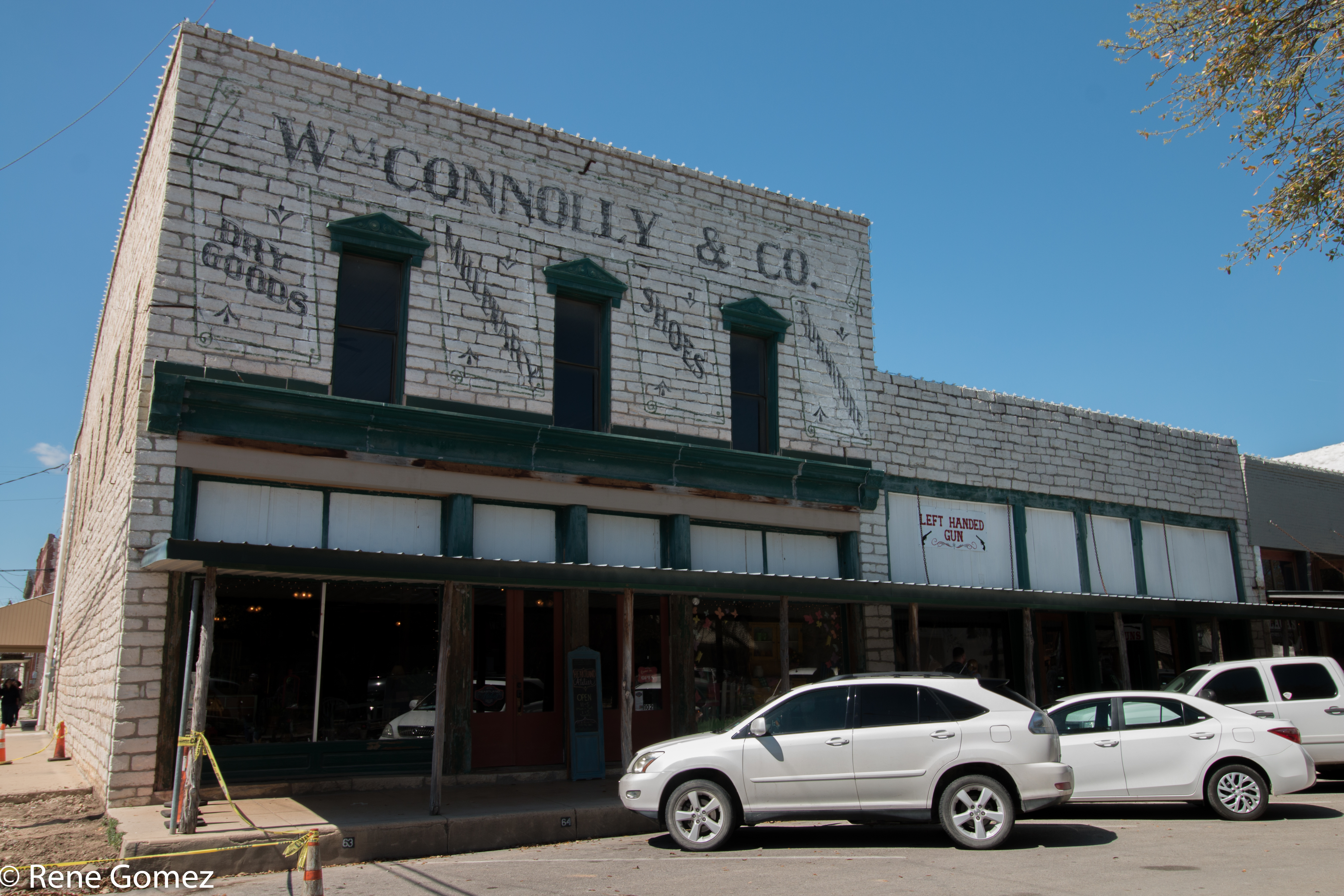
Connolly Building

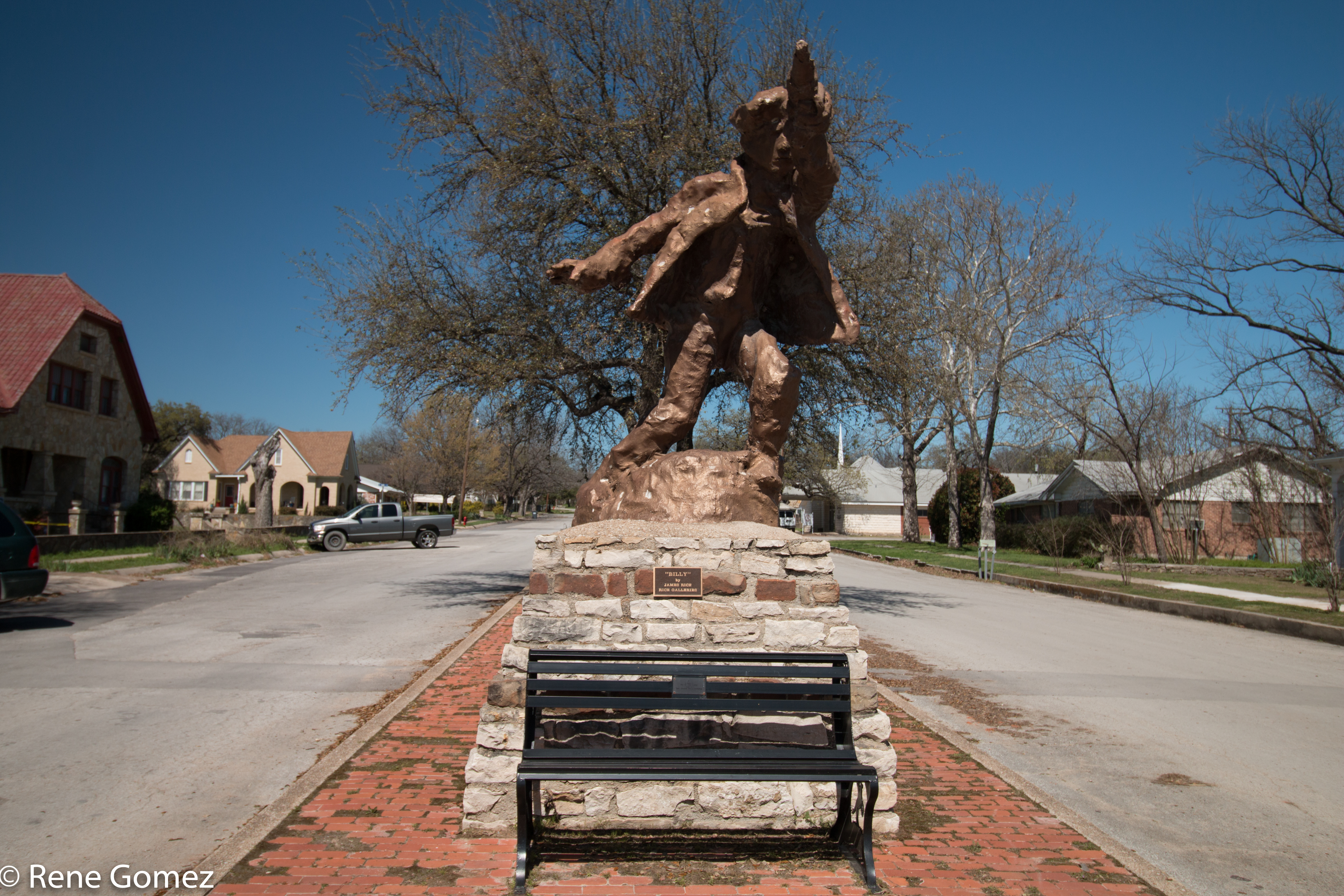
Billy the Kid statue

== See also ==
- List of cities in Texas
