= Hamilton Independent School District =

School district in Texas

Coordinates: 31.7005°N 98.1266°W

Hamilton Independent School District is a public school district based in Hamilton, Texas (USA).

Located in Hamilton County, a small portion of the district extends into Comanche and Mills counties.

In 2009, the school district was rated "recognized" by the Texas Education Agency.

On July 1, 1989 the Pottsville Independent School District merged into the Hamilton district.

== Schools ==
- Hamilton High School (Grades 9-12)
- Hamilton Junior High (Grades 6-8)
- Ann Whitney Elementary (Grades PK-5)
