= Hamilton, Texas =

- City
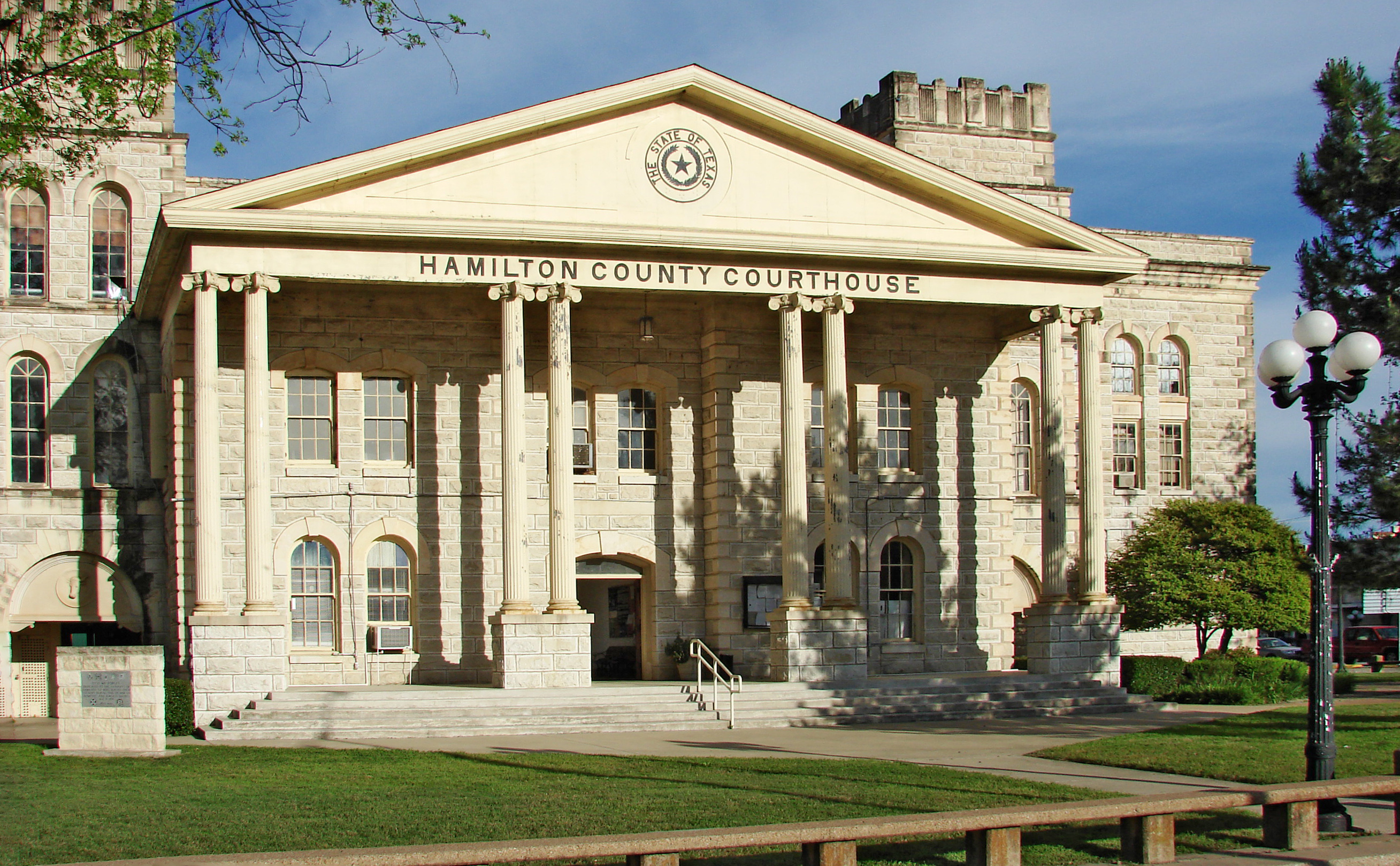
- Hamilton County Courthouse

- Location of Hamilton Hamilton (the United States)
- Coordinates: 31°40′56″N 98°08′12″W
- Country: United States
- State: Texas
- County: Hamilton

Area
  - Total: 3.53 sq mi (9.15 km^{2})
  - Land: 3.47 sq mi (8.98 km^{2})
  - Water: 0.066 sq mi (0.17 km^{2})
- Elevation: 1,178 ft (359 m)

Population (2020)
  - Total: 2,895
  - Density: 835/sq mi (322.4/km^{2})
- Time zone: UTC-6 (Central (CST))
  - Summer (DST): UTC-5 (CDT)
- ZIP code: 76531
- Area code: 254
- FIPS code: 48-31952
- GNIS feature ID: 2410693
- Website: hamiltontexas.com

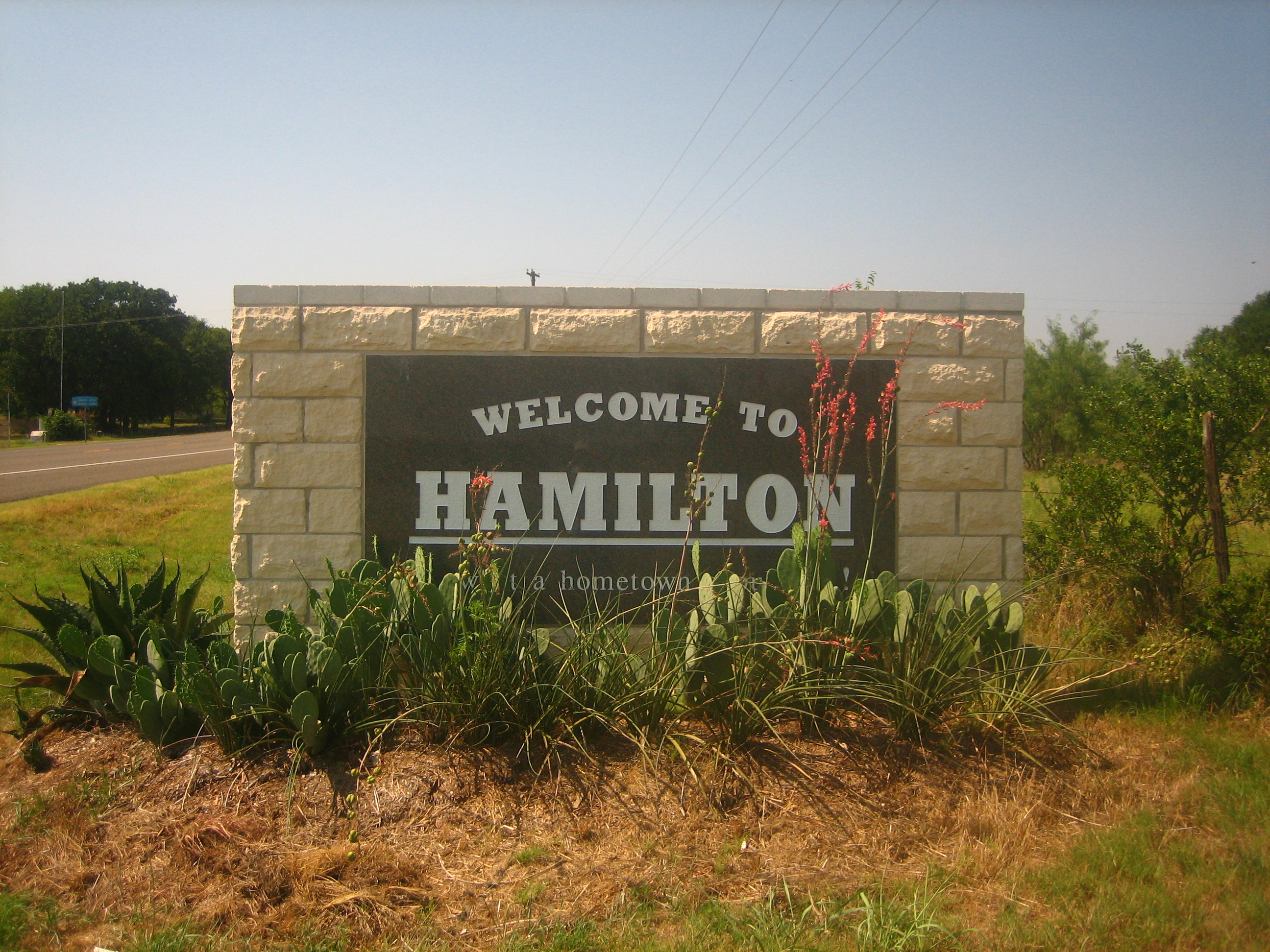
Welcome sign in Hamilton

Hamilton is a city in and the county seat of Hamilton County, Texas, United States, located in the state's central region. Its population was 2,895 at the 2020 census.

== Geography ==
Hamilton is located in central Hamilton County. U.S. Route 281 passes through the center of the city, leading north 21 miles (34 km) to Hico and south 16 miles (26 km) to Evant. Texas State Highway 36 (Main Street) crosses US 281 in the center of town and leads 32 miles (51 km) southeast to Gatesville and 33 miles (53 km) northwest to Comanche. Texas State Highway 22 leads northeast from Hamilton 33 miles (53 km) to Meridian.

According to the United States Census Bureau, the city has a total area of 3.5 sq mi (9.1 km^{2}), of which 0.1 sq mi (0.2 km^{2}), or 1.8%, is covered by water. The city is drained by Pecan Creek, an eastward-flowing tributary of the Leon River.

== Demographics ==
Historical population
Census	Pop.	Note	%±
1880	277		—
1890	726		162.1%
1910	1,548		—
1920	2,018		30.4%
1930	2,084		3.3%
1940	2,716		30.3%
1950	3,077		13.3%
1960	3,106		0.9%
1970	2,760		−11.1%
1980	3,189		15.5%
1990	2,937		−7.9%
2000	2,977		1.4%
2010	3,095		4.0%
2020	2,895		−6.5%
U.S. Decennial Census

=== 2020 census ===
As of the 2020 census, Hamilton had a population of 2,895 people in 1,197 households, including 632 families. The median age was 42.6 years; 22.9% of residents were under the age of 18 and 24.6% were 65 years of age or older. For every 100 females there were 87.5 males, and for every 100 females age 18 and over there were 83.5 males age 18 and over.

0.0% of residents lived in urban areas, while 100.0% lived in rural areas.

There were 1,197 households in Hamilton, of which 28.3% had children under the age of 18 living in them. Of all households, 44.4% were married-couple households, 17.9% were households with a male householder and no spouse or partner present, and 31.7% were households with a female householder and no spouse or partner present. About 32.1% of all households were made up of individuals and 17.6% had someone living alone who was 65 years of age or older.

There were 1,395 housing units, of which 14.2% were vacant. The homeowner vacancy rate was 3.7% and the rental vacancy rate was 15.0%.

Racial composition as of the 2020 census
Race	Number	Percent
White	2,512	86.8%
Black or African American	8	0.3%
American Indian and Alaska Native	17	0.6%
Asian	13	0.4%
Native Hawaiian and Other Pacific Islander	1	0.0%
Some other race	115	4.0%
Two or more races	229	7.9%
Hispanic or Latino (of any race)	436	15.1%

=== 2010 census ===
As of the census of 2010, 3,095 people, 1,230 households, and 777 families were residing in the city. The population density was 1,067.2 people/sq mi (412.7/km^{2}). The 1,470 housing units averaged 506.9/sq mi (196 per km^{2}). The racial makeup of the city was 94.5% White, 0.7% African American, 0.7% Native American, 0.5% Asian, 2.8% from other races, and 0.8% from two or more races. Hispanics or Latinos of any race were 8.9% of the population.

Of the 1,230 households, 26.9% had children under 18 living with them, 45.7% were married couples living together, 13.3% had a female householder with no husband present, 4.1% had a male householder with no wife present, and 36.8% were not families. About 32.1% of all households were made up of individuals, and 17.6% had someone living alone who was 65 years of age or older. The average household size was 2.38, and the average family size was 2.92.

In the city, the age distribution was 21.8% under 18, 27.9% from 18 to 44, 23.9% from 45 to 64, and 26.4% who were 65 or older. The median age was 45.2 years. For every 100 females, there were 86.4 males. For every 100 females age 18 and over, there were 82.2 males.

The median income for a household in the city was $26,585, and for a family was $38,702. Males had a median income of $27,074 versus $17,500 for females. The per capita income for the city was $15,012. About 12.2% of families and 15.9% of the population were below the poverty line, including 23.0% of those under age 18 and 16.1% of those age 65 or over.

== Education ==
The city is served by the Hamilton Independent School District.

== Landmarks ==
The Hamilton County Courthouse, built in 1897, was added to the National Register of Historic Places in April 1980.

== Notable people ==
- Mark Harelik, actor and playwright, was born and raised in Hamilton.
- Louise Latham, actress, was born and raised in Hamilton.
- Brushy Bill, the man who claimed to be infamous outlaw Billy the Kid, died in Hico.

== Transportation ==
Hamilton is home to Hamilton Municipal Airport, a city-owned, public-use airport located at the south edge of the city.

=== Major highways ===
- U.S. Route 281 is the largest highway and main north–south route through Hamilton. US 281 runs from the Mexico–US border in the south to the Canada–US border in the north.
- Texas State Highway 36 runs through Hamilton on a generally east–west axis on its way between Abilene to the northwest and Freeport to the southeast.
- Texas State Highway 22 reaches its western terminus within the city limits of Hamilton at its junction with State Highway 36 near the eastern edge of the city. State Highway 22 runs east from Hamilton to Corsicana.

== Climate ==
The climate in this area is characterized by hot, humid summers and generally mild to cool winters. According to the Köppen climate classification, Hamilton has a humid subtropical climate, Cfa on climate maps.

== Photo Gallery ==
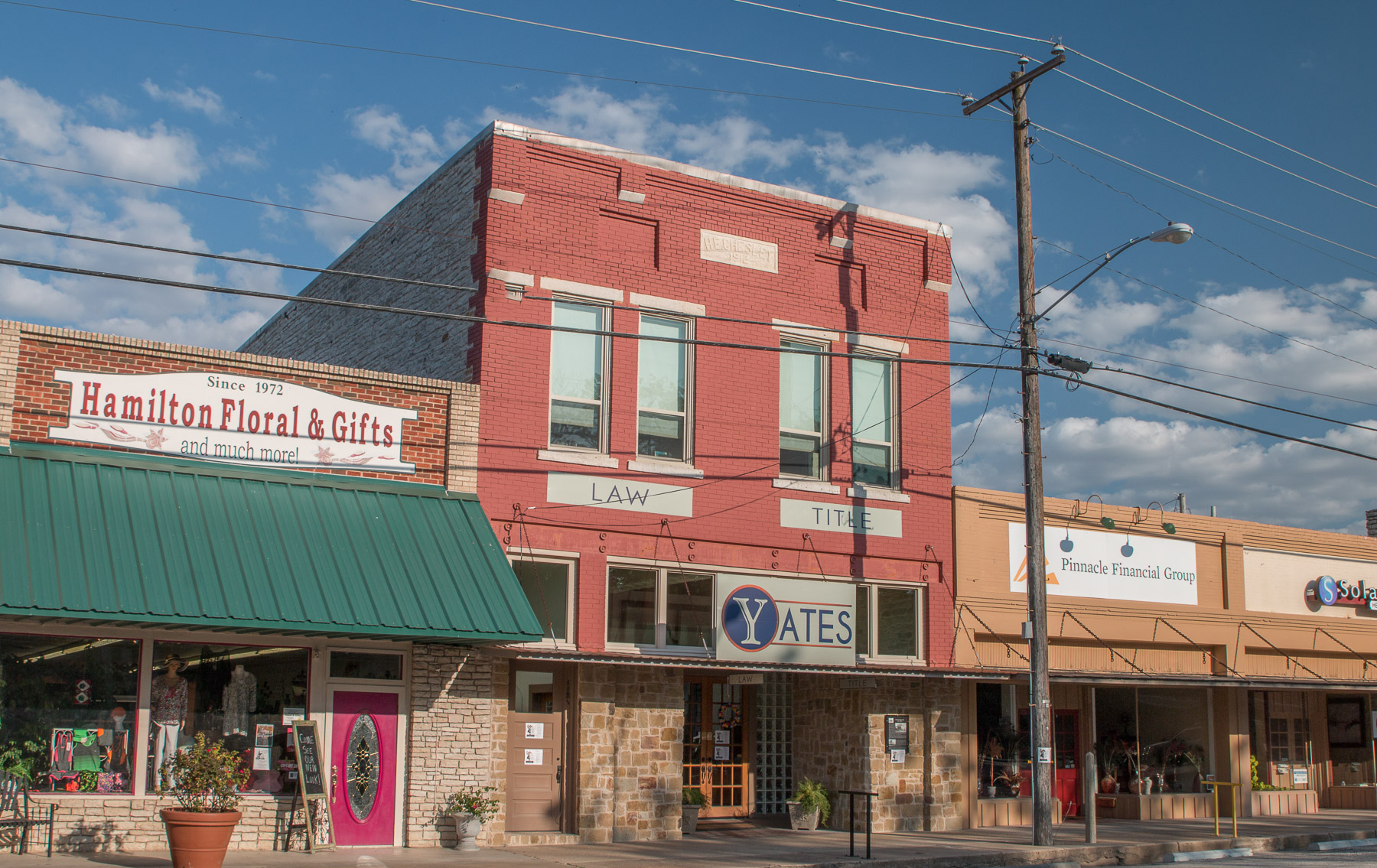
Chelsey Building

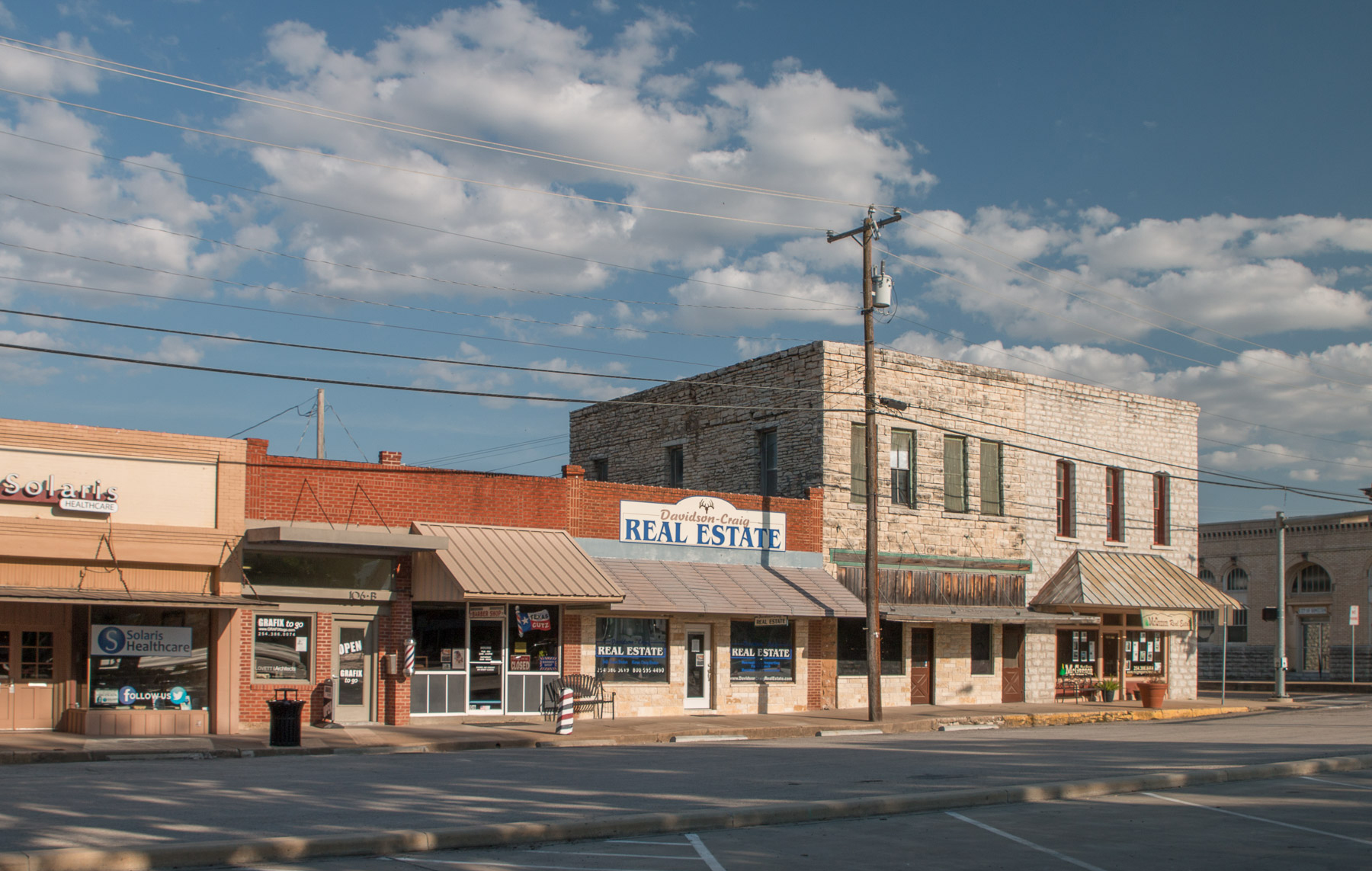
Downtown Hamilton

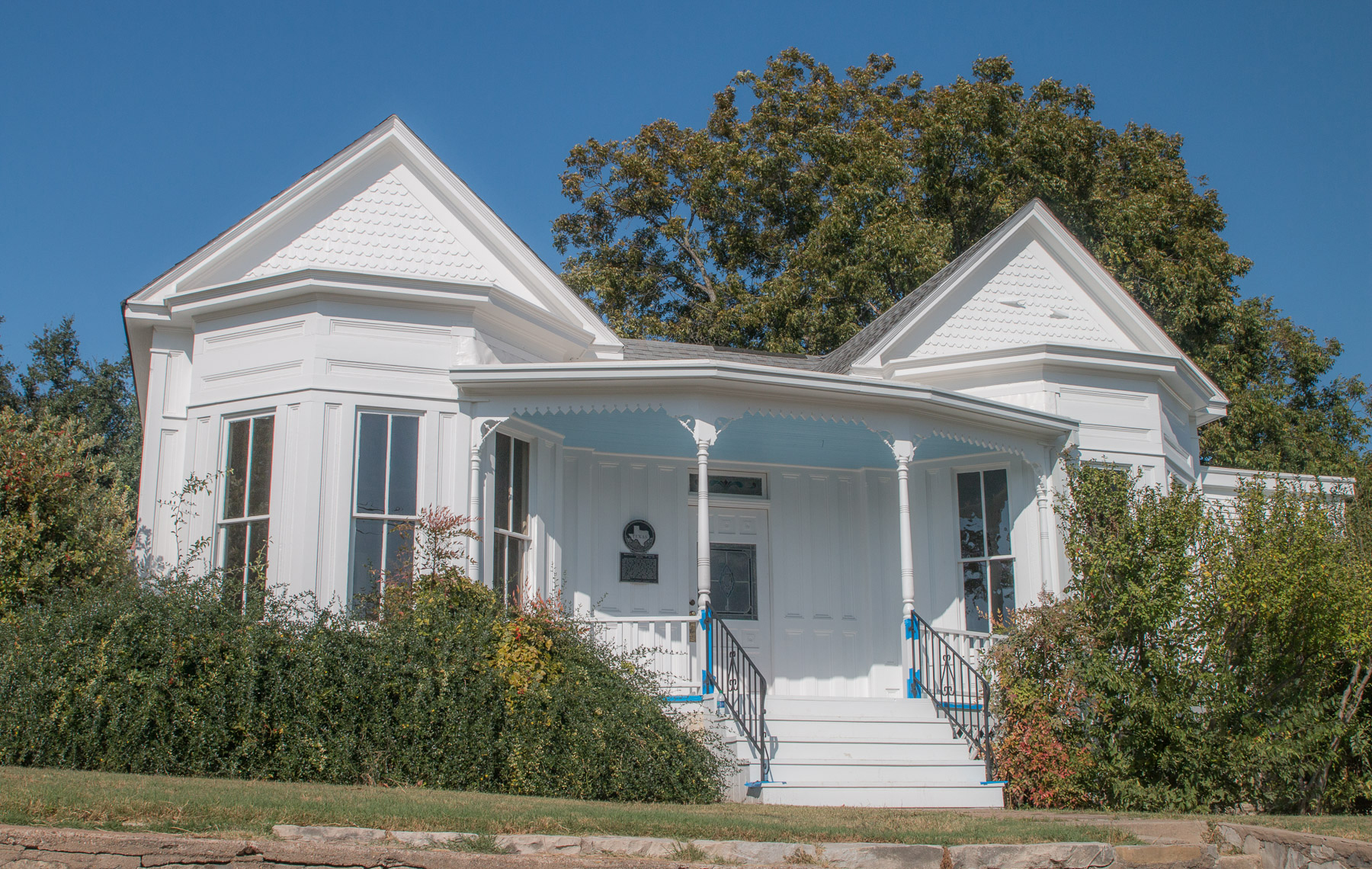
Manning-Gordon-Henderson House

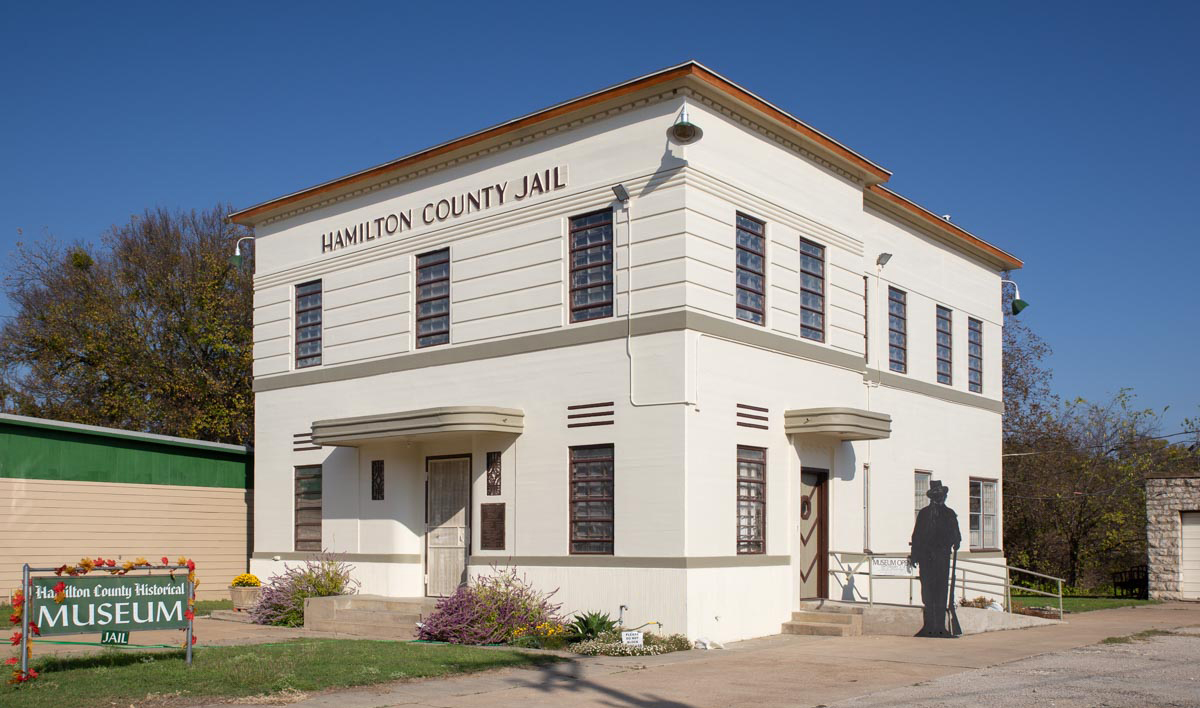
Hamilton County Jail
