= Kokomo =

Kokomo may refer to:

== Animals ==
- Kokomo (gorilla), a western lowland gorilla at the San Diego Zoo
- Kokomo Jr., a name given to two performing chimpanzees in the 1950s and 1960s

== Music ==
=== Songs ===
- "Kokomo" (song), by the Beach Boys (1988)
- "Ko Ko Mo (I Love You So)", a rock/novelty song written in 1954 by Forest Gene Wilson and Eunice Levy
- "Kokomo", by Greg Brown from The Evening Call
- "Kokomo", by Little Feat from Down on the Farm
- "Kokomo, IN", by Japanese Breakfast from Jubilee

=== Other ===
- Kokomo (band), a British group from the 1970s
- Kokomo Records, a record company from the 1960/70s

== People ==
- Kokomo Arnold (1896/1901–1968), born James Arnold, American blues musician
- Kokomo (musician), one-time name used by American pianist, arranger and songwriter Jimmy Wisner (1931–2018)
- Kokomo Murase (2004–), Japanese snowboarder
- Ma-Ko-Ko-Mo (1775–1838), a chief of the Miami tribe for whom Kokomo, Indiana, was named

== Places ==
=== United States ===
- Kokomo, Indiana, a city in Howard County, that is also its county seat
  - Indiana University Kokomo
- Kokomo, Arkansas, an unincorporated area in Lee County
- Kokomo, Colorado, a ghost town in Summit County
- Kokomo, Hawaii, a community on the island of Maui
- Kokomo, Mississippi, an unincorporated community in Marion County
- Kokomo, Texas, an unincorporated community in Eastland County

==== Kokomo Creek ====
- Kokomo Creek, a tributary of the Chatanika River, Alaska
- Kokomo Creek, a creek in Hot Spring County, Arkansas
- Kokomo Creek, a tributary of Wildcat Creek (Indiana)

=== Elsewhere ===
- Sandals Cay (formerly Kokomo Island), a privately owned island in Jamaica
- Kokomo Beach, a beach on the island of Curaçao

== Radio ==
A 2013 BBC Radio play by Julian Simpson
