= Ulane Bonnel =

American naval historian (1918–2006)

- Born: Ulane Zeeck; 22 September 1918; Lingleville, Texas, US
- Died: 26 September 2006 (aged 88); Paris, France

Academic background
- Education: Sorbonne; University of Geneva; West Texas A&M University

Academic work
- Discipline: Naval historian
- Sub-discipline: French and American naval history
- Institutions: CRS; Library of Congress
- Military career
- Allegiance: United States
- Branch: United States Navy
- Rank: Lieutenant commander

Ulane Bonnel (née Zeeck; 22 September 1918 – 26 September 2006) was an American naval historian working in France, who played a major role developing professional connections between American and French naval historians and in founding both the scholarly journal Chronique d'histoire maritime and the French Commission of Maritime History (Commission française d'histoire maritime).

== Early life and education ==
Bonnel was born on 22 September 1918, in Lingleville, Texas. She took her Bachelor of Arts degree at West Texas State College at Canyon, Texas. She joined the U.S. Navy and was given a naval commission in 1943 after attending the Naval Midshipman's (Women's Reserve) Training School at Northampton, Massachusetts. While on active duty, she served as a recruiting officer, instructor, and personnel officer. At the end of the war, she served in the Congressional liaison unit at the Bureau of Naval Personnel. Leaving naval service in 1946 after reaching the rank of lieutenant commander, she went on to work for the Congressional Research Service at the Library of Congress, specializing in military affairs. While in Washington, she met an officer in the French Navy's medical corps then serving with the French naval mission in Washington, D.C., Paul-Henri Bonnel (1912–1984), whom she married in 1947. Following their marriage, Bonnel went to France with her husband, who had a distinguished career in the French Navy, rising to be chief of the maritime health service (chef du service santé des gens de mer) from 1969 to 1972 and an internationally recognized biologist associated with the World Health Organization.

After discovering a love for history in Texas, Bonnel went to the Université de Genève, Switzerland, while her husband was serving at the headquarters of the World Health Organization from 1951. There, she studied under aul Collart, Luc Monnier, and Pierre Traschler. Going further with her studies, she completed her doctoral thesis under Marcel Reinhard and Marcel Dunan at the Sorbonne on French and American privateering in the period between 1797 and 1815, including the Quasi-War with France and the War of 1812.

== Professional career ==
Upon completing her doctorate, Bonnel immediately began to work in the field of naval history and quickly became a key figure in reviving this subject that had long been neglected by universities in France. She was the founder of the journal Chronique d'histoire maritime in 1979 and, a key figure in organizing the Commission française d'histoire maritime in 1980, and later served as its president in 1986–1989.

In 1964, she was appointed the delegate in France for the Library of Congress and played an extremely important role in developing cooperation between French and American naval historians in the period leading up to the bicentenary of the United States. In this role, she was the key person who coordinated the photocopying of documents from French archives for the Library of Congress and the U.S. Navy's Naval Historical Center, relating to the key role that the French Navy played in obtaining American Independence in 1778–1783. Many of the documents she acquired were translated to enrich the U.S. Navy's multivolume series on Naval Documents of the American Revolution, begun by William Bell Clark and William J. Morgan.

In recognition of her contributions to Franco-American historical relations, she was elected the first woman member of the History, Letters, and Arts section of the Académie de Marine. She also served as president of the Association internationale des Docteurs des Universités françaises and vice-president of the Institut Napoléon. After the 1984 discovery of the wreck of CSS Alabama, sunk in Cherbourg harbor during the American Civil War, she helped to organize both the French and American branches of the CSS Alabama Association, serving as president of the French branch and helping to develop support for its work in underwater archeology on the site of the wreck. In this role, she was the key person working to negotiate the international agreement between France and the United States over the wreck and the wreck site in French waters.

== Published works ==
- (in French) La France, les États-Unis et la guerre de course (1797–1815) (1961)
- (in French) Jean-Gaspard de Vence, premier Préfet Maritime de Toulon, Revue de l'Institut Napoléon (1964)
- (in French) Le Contre-Amiral Vence, Commandant d'Armes à Toulon, Revue Neptunia (1964)
- (in English) West Texas: the Z ranch or the story of the Zeeburgs (1970)
- (in English) Under the ice cap (1970)
- (in French) Sainte-Hélène, terre d'exil (1971)
- (in French) Guide des sources de l'histoire des États-Unis dans les archives françaises, with Madeline Astorquia and others (1976)
- (in French) Fleurieu et la marine de son temps, colloque organisé par la Commission française d'histoire maritime, edited by Ulane Bonnel (1992)

== Additional sources ==
The papers of Ulane Bonnel's husband, Paul-Henri Bonnel, are held in 41 cartons at the Service Historique de la Défense (Marine), Château de Vincennes, Fonds privé, Sous-Série GG^{2} 176

=== Obituaries ===
Chronique d'histoire maritime, no. 61, décembre 2006, pp. 188–189, by Etienne Taillemite.
Pull Together: Newsletter of the Naval Historical Foundation, Fall/Winter 2006/2007, p. 14, by William S. Dudley.
