= Rising Star High School =

Location
- 905 North Main Street; Rising Star, Texas 76471-0037; United States; 32.104476°N 98.964369°W

Information
- School type: Public high school
- School district: Rising Star Independent School District
- Principal: Monty Jones
- Staff: 12.71 (FTE)
- Grades: 7-12
- Enrollment: 88 (2023–2024)
- Student to teacher ratio: 6.92
- Colors: Blue & Gold
- Athletics conference: UIL Class A
- Mascot: Wildcat
- Website: Rising Star High School

Rising Star High School is a public high school located in Rising Star, Texas (USA) and classified as a 1A school by the UIL. It is part of the Rising Star Independent School District located in south central Eastland County. In 2013, the school was rated "Met Standard" by the Texas Education Agency.

== Athletics ==
The Rising Star Wildcats compete in the following sports

- Basketball
- Cross Country
- 6-Man Football
- Golf
- Tennis
- Track and Field
- Softball

=== State titles ===
- Boys Track
  - 1950(B)
- Girls Track
  - 1978(B)
- UIL Cross-Examination Debate
  - 2011
- Marching Band
  - 2015
- Girls Doubles Tennis
  - 2017
- Boys Golf
  - 2018
- UIL Social Studies
  - 2017 and 2018

== See also ==
- List of high schools in Texas
