= 2022 Texas wildfires =

Natural disasters in the USA

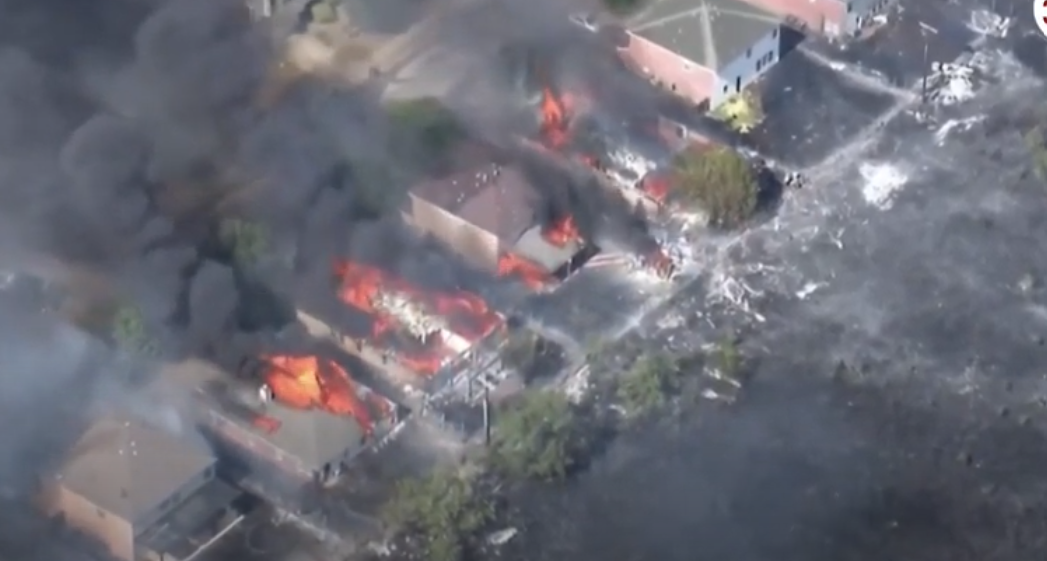
A grass fire burning houses in the suburbs of Dallas, Texas

The 2022 Texas Wildfires are a series of wildfires occurring in 2022 in the state of Texas. They include 371 individual fires occurring throughout Texas. A total of 210,045 acres were burned in the 2022 Texas wildfires according to the Texas A&M Forest Service, with the largest fire being the Eastland Complex fire.

== Background ==
While "fire season" varies every year in Texas, most wildfires occur in between February and April. However, there is an increasing fire danger all year-round. Fire conditions can be exacerbated by drought, strong winds, La Niña, and vegetation growth. Climate change is leading to increased temperatures, lower humidity levels, and drought conditions that are happening more often.

== Notable fires ==
=== Eastland Complex ===
Eastland Complex fires of 2022
- Date: March 17, 2022
- Location: Central Texas

Statistics
- Total fires: 382
- Total area: 210,045 acres (85,002 ha)

Impacts
- Deaths: 1
- Injuries: 1
- Structures lost: 50
- Cost: Unknown

On March 17, 2022, a fire complex formed around 3 km (0 mi) SE of Romney. It was claimed to have been started by drought condition and is now 90% contained. The biggest fire so far is the Kidd fire, burning about 42,333 acres.

Smoke from the fires reached as far as Houston.

==== Crittenberg Complex ====
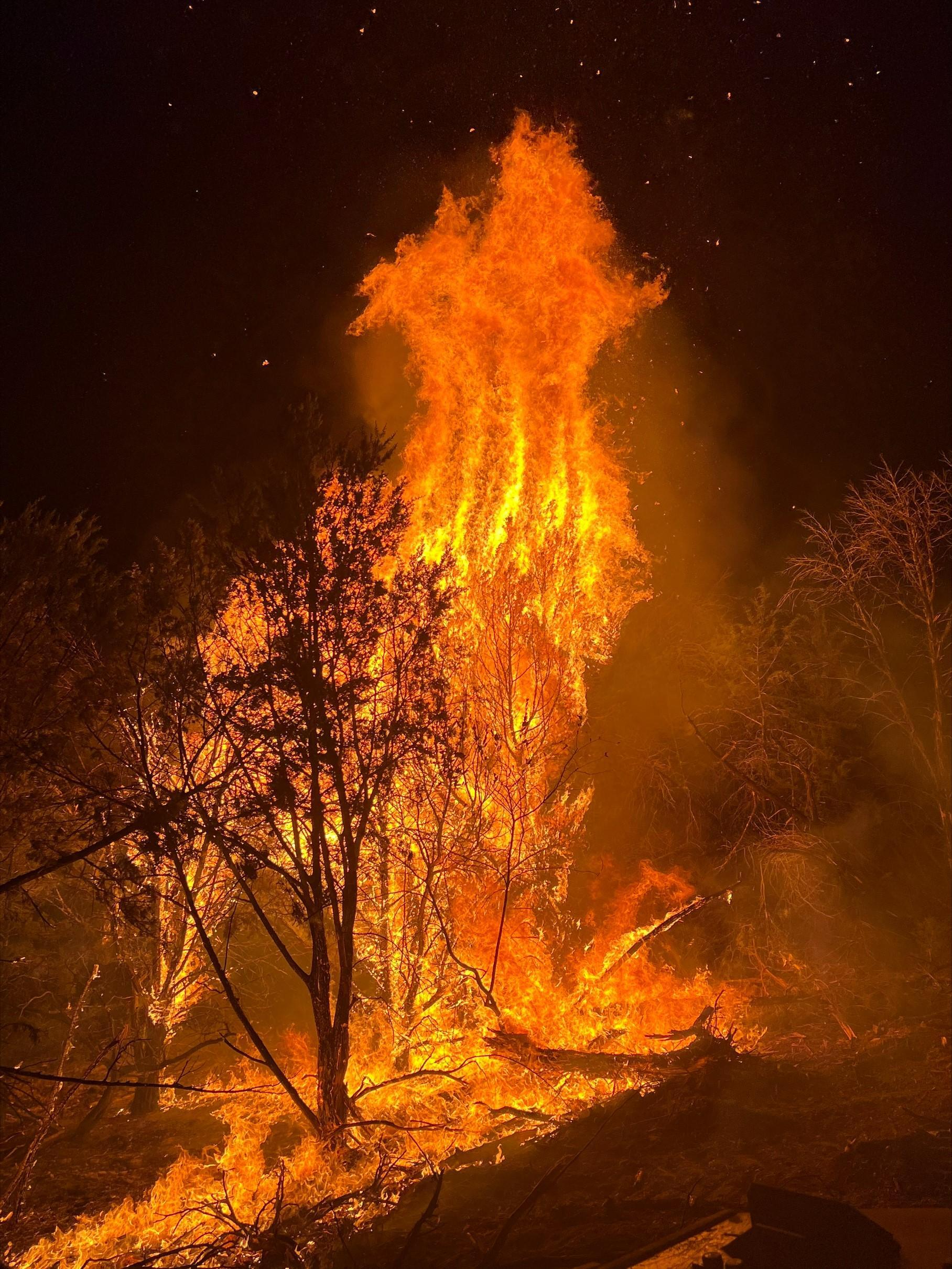
Chalk Mountain Fire burning at night

A fast wildfire near Fort Cavazos burned about 33,000 acres and was 55% contained.

===== Borrega Fire =====
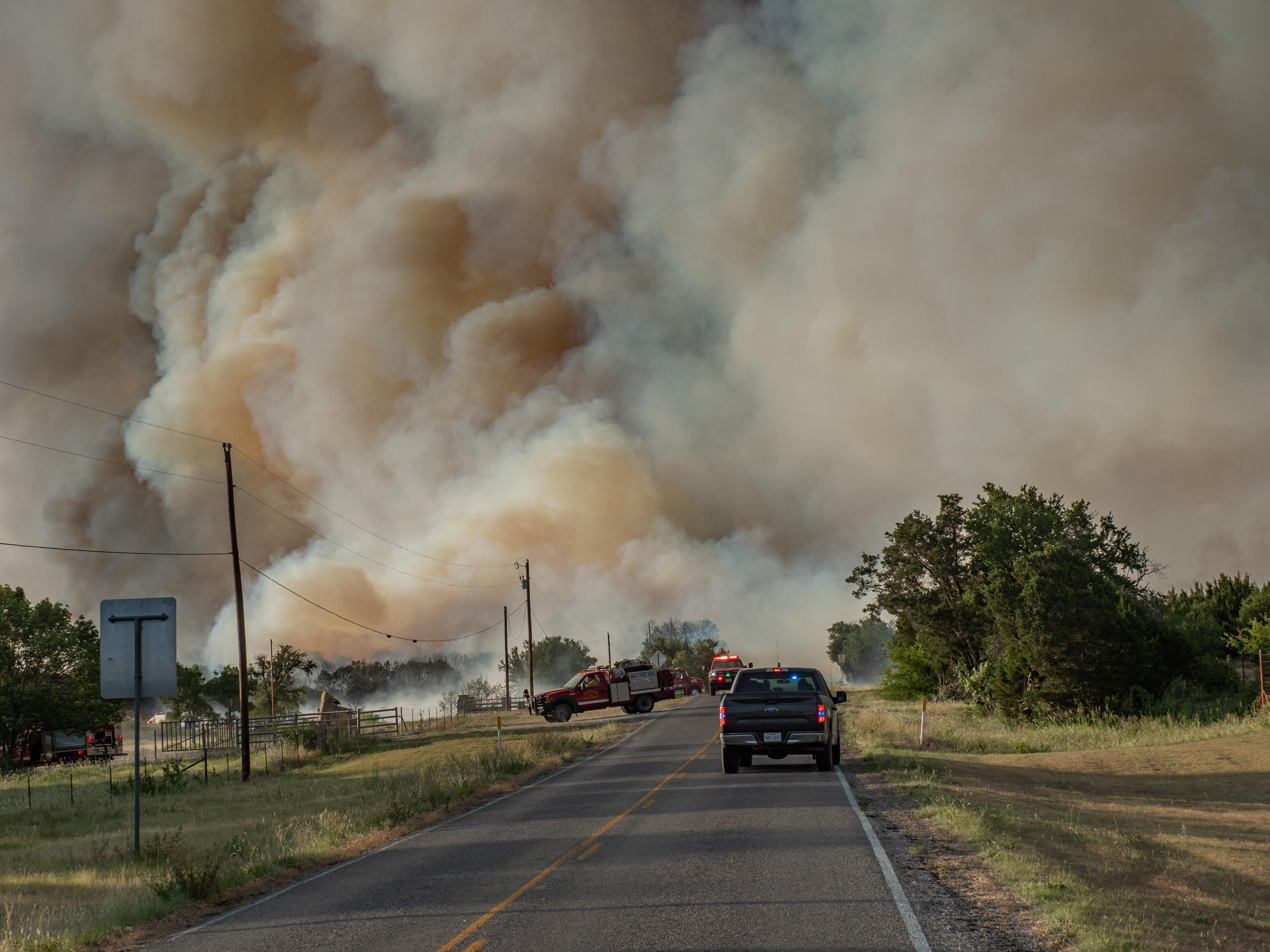
Smoke pollution from Dempsey fire, Palo Pinto County

Borrega Fire is the largest Texas fire since the Iron Mountain Fire in May 2011 and currently, 60,000 acres have been burned and was 95% contained.

== List of wildfires ==
The following is a list of fires that burned more than 1,000 acres (400 ha), produced significant structural damage or casualties, or were otherwise notable.

Name	County	Acres	Start date	Containment date	Notes	Ref
Eastland Complex fires	Eastland, Comanche, Calhan	54,463	March 17, 2022	April 8, 2022		
Ramsey Fire	Brown	3,456	March 17, 2022	April 12, 2022		
Das Goat Fire	Medina	1,092	March 25, 2022	April 15, 2022		
Borrega Fire	Kleberg	51,566	March 25, 2022	April 15, 2022		
Coconut Fire	Wilbarger	15,000	May 17, 2022	June 3, 2022		
Dempsey Fire	Palo Pinto	11,598	June 23, 2022	July 10, 2022		
Nethery Road Fire	Kimble	3,262	July 10, 2022	July 21, 2022	Unknown cause	
Nelson Creek Fire	Walker	1,896	July 18, 2022	July 25, 2022	Unknown cause	
Chalk Mountain Fire	Hood	6,755	July 18, 2022	August 2, 2022	Unknown cause	
West Bend Fire	Wichita	6,522	July 19, 2022	July 23, 2022	Unknown cause	

== See also ==
- 2022 New Mexico wildfires
- Wildfires in 2022
