= Staff, Texas =

Staff
- Unincorporated Community
- Interactive map of Staff
- Location within Texas Bevilport (the United States)
- Coordinates: 32°21′33″N 98°42′23″W
- Country: United States
- State: Texas
- County: Eastland County
- Elevation: 1,512 ft (461 m)
- Postal code: 76481

Staff is an unincorporated community located along Farm Road 2214 in Eastland County, Texas, United States.

== History ==
Staff developed as a community with the construction of the Round Mountain Baptist Church in 1896. A post office was built in 1897 with Ferdinando S. Taylor as its first postmaster, which then closed in 1908. The community had a store and a population of 60 in 1940, then increased to 65 in 1980 and 2015. A community cemetery called the Staff Cemetery is located in the area.
