= Rising Star Independent School District =

School district in Texas

Coordinates: 32.1051°N 98.9642°W

Rising Star Independent School District is a public school district based in Rising Star, Texas (USA).

Located in Eastland County, very small portions of the district extend into Brown and Comanche counties.

On February 23, 2023, the Rising Star school board was reportedly prepared to accept the resignation of superintendent Robby Stuteville. In January 2023, Stuteville, who was allowed to carry a handgun under current Texas law, left his weapon in a restroom stall where it was discovered by a student.

== Academic achievement ==
In 2009, the school district was rated "recognized" by the Texas Education Agency.

== Schools ==
- Rising Star High/Junior High School (Grades 7-12)
- Rising Star Elementary School (Grades PK-6)

== Special programs ==
=== Athletics ===
Rising Star High School plays six-man football.

== See also ==
- List of school districts in Texas
- List of high schools in Texas
