= John B. Heffernan =

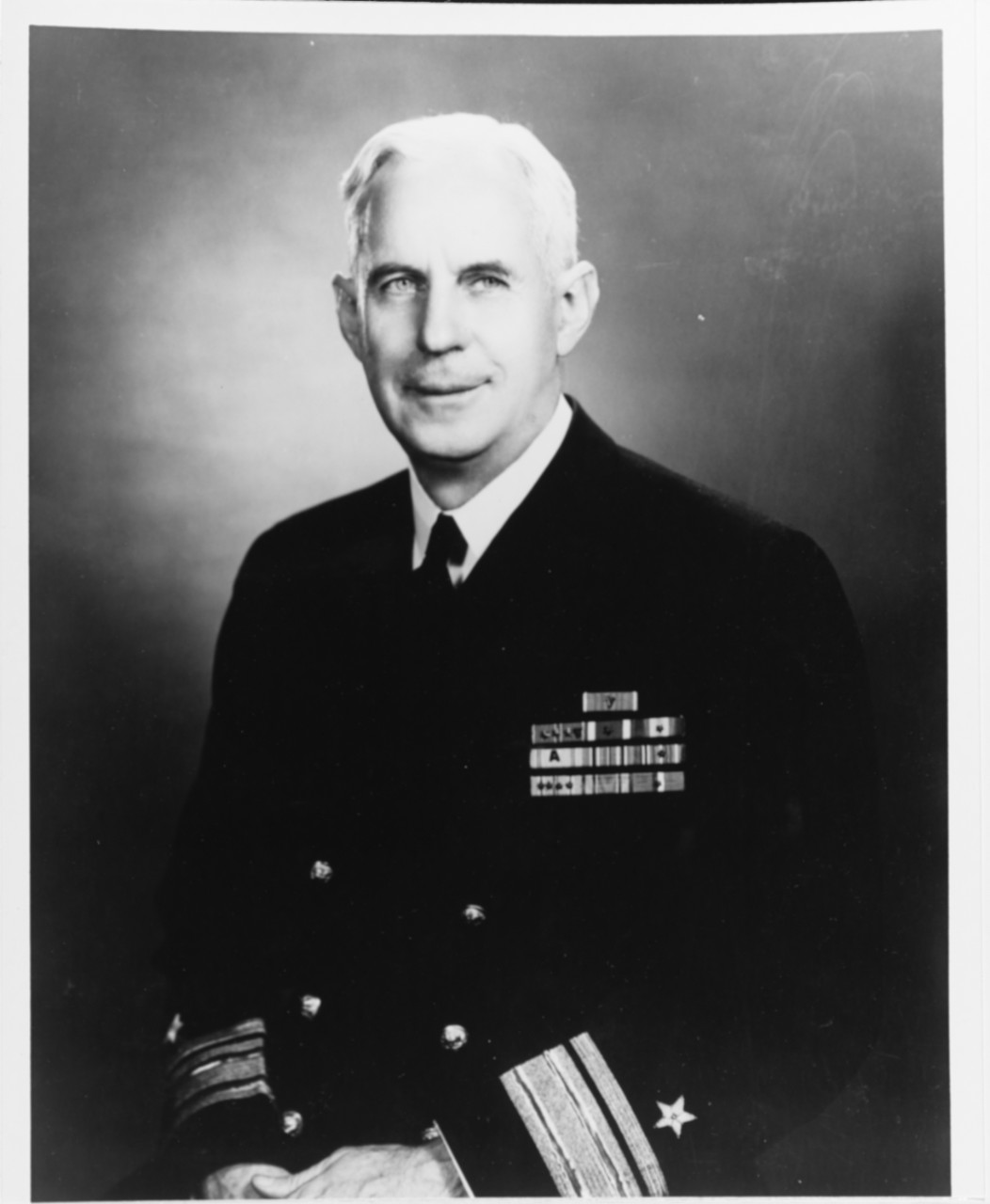
Rear Admiral John B. Heffernan, USN, c. 1951

John Baptist Heffernan (October 21, 1894 – April 17, 1978) was an American naval officer and historian, who served during World War I and World War II, commanding the battleship Tennessee in several Pacific Theatre engagements during the latter, and rose to the rank of rear admiral while being director of naval history for the United States Navy Department.

== Early life and education ==
Heffernan was born in Washington, Indiana, on October 21, 1894, the son of William and Ellen Sullivan Heffernan. He attended Washington High School, where he was an honor student. As a distance runner for the track and field team he excelled as well; in 1912 at the Indiana high school state championship meet at Purdue University's Stuart Field, Heffernan came in first in both the half-mile and mile runs and led his team to a fourth-place finish overall.

He attended the United States Naval Academy, beginning in 1913. During his time there, in 1916, he won a prize for the best essay embodying naval or patriotic themes. He graduated from there in March 1917 (the ceremony was held three months earlier than usual due to the likelihood of American entry into World War I).

== World War I ==
Heffernan served in the United States Navy in World War I. He was stationed on destroyers, that were positioned in the European theatre of the conflict.

== Interwar ==
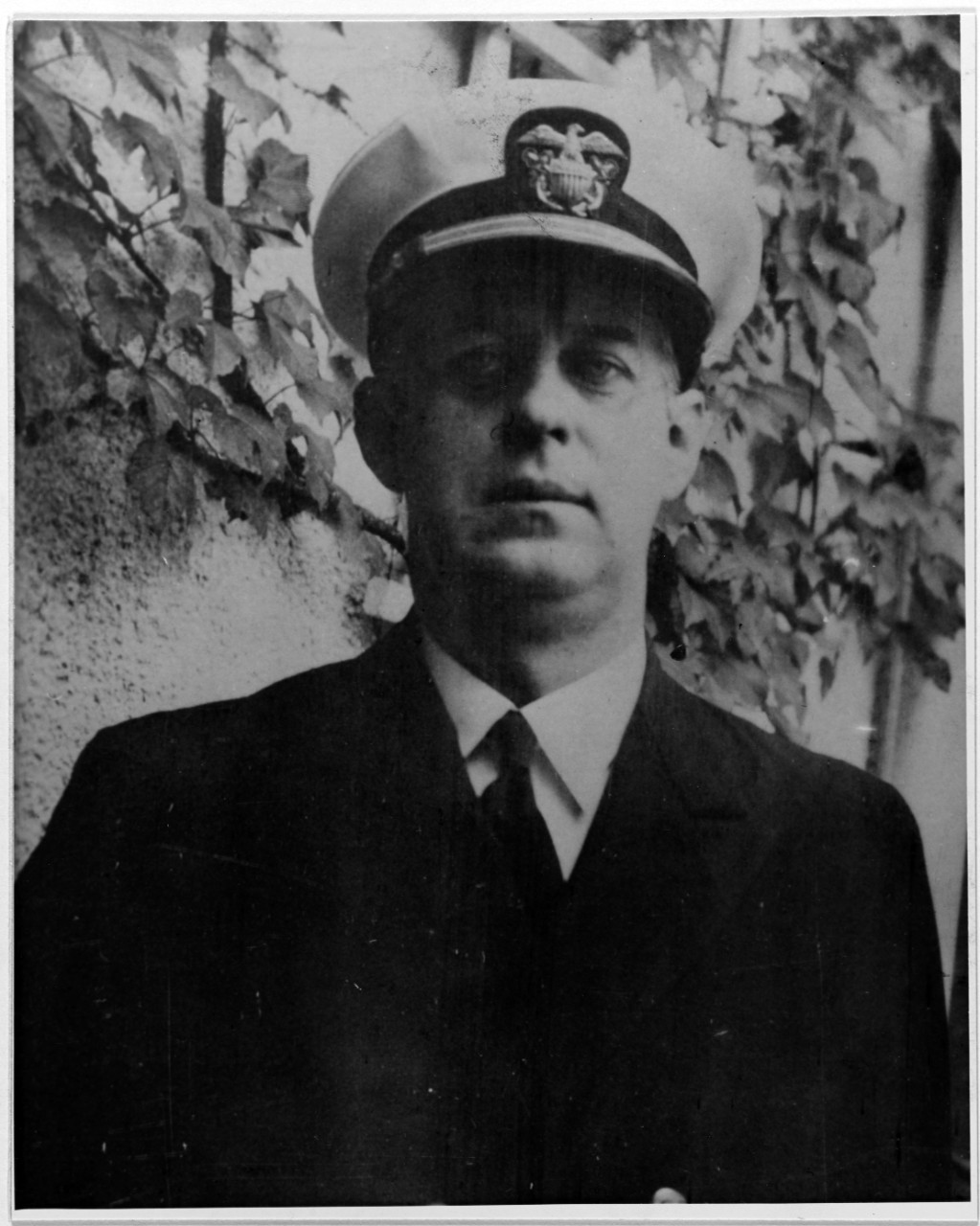
Lieutenant Heffernan served as naval press officer from 1922 to 1924

As of 1919, Heffernan was serving as a lieutenant on board the destroyer Gamble. For the better part of 1920, he was its acting commanding officer. In 1921, he was assigned to another destroyer, the Coghlan.

During the early 1920s, Heffernan served as a press information officer at the United States Department of the Navy and also as a naval aide at the White House. He is said to have been traveling with President Warren G. Harding when the chief executive died in San Francisco in 1923. In a travel column series published in newspapers during 1924, Heffernan discussed the history and current state of the islands of the West Indies. Heffernan also served in the Office of Naval Intelligence during this period.

In 1927, Heffernan married Patricia Gratton Esmonde, the daughter of Sir Thomas Esmonde, 11th Baronet. The wedding took place in Dublin, Ireland, her home country. They would have four children.

Heffernan returned to the Naval Academy, this time as an instructor in history, for the years 1932–33 and 1938–40. In 1937, he was promoted from lieutenant commander to commander.

== World War II ==
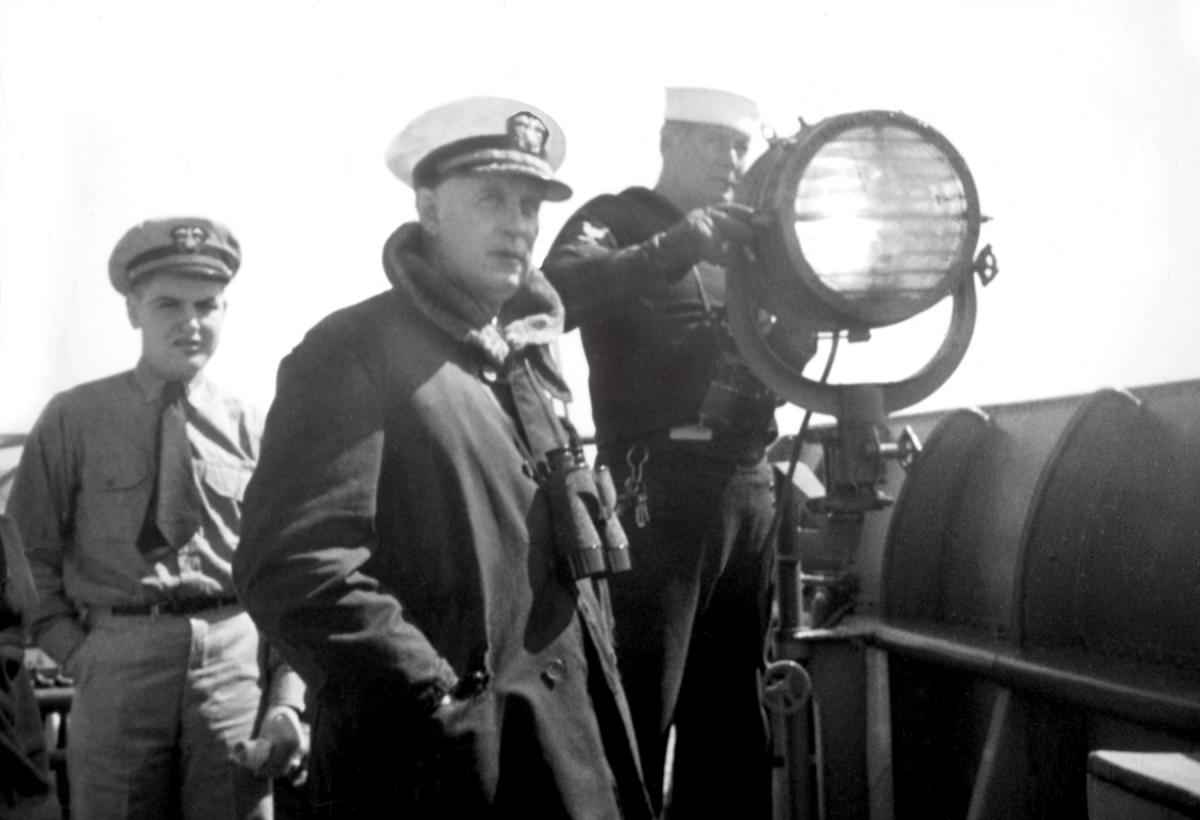
While assigned to the USS Buck (DD-420) in July 1942, historian Samuel Eliot Morison took this photograph of Commander Heffernan on one of the destroyer's bridge wings

Starting in June 1940, Heffernan took command of a destroyer division, and later, of Destroyer Squadron 13. Before American entry into World War II, Heffernan was part of the June 1941 mission that took over the British role in the Allied occupation of Iceland. Once the United States joined in the Battle of the Atlantic, Heffernan's destroyers joined in convoy escort duty in the North Atlantic.

During one crossing in July 1942, Heffernan became friendly with the embedded historian Samuel Eliot Morison and gave him insight into the nature of naval operations as the convoy sailed in Scottish waters. This began a long professional relationship between the two. A while later, when Morison was looking at stateside shore facilities, Heffernan suggested that Morison talk to the staff of Secretary of the Navy Frank Knox and get himself assigned to "a 'cruise' on an interesting ship", which would turn out to be one of those of the Western Naval Task Force involved in the upcoming Operation Torch in North Africa.

In that operation, Heffernan commanded destroyers at the Naval Battle of Casablanca in November 1942, destroyers that provided a screen for the invasion force.

Subsequently, Heffernan was assigned to the Pacific theater. During the U.S. recapture of Guam in July and August 1944, he was in command of a division of five transport ships. He was also the chief of staff for a Service Squadron near the areas of forward operation.

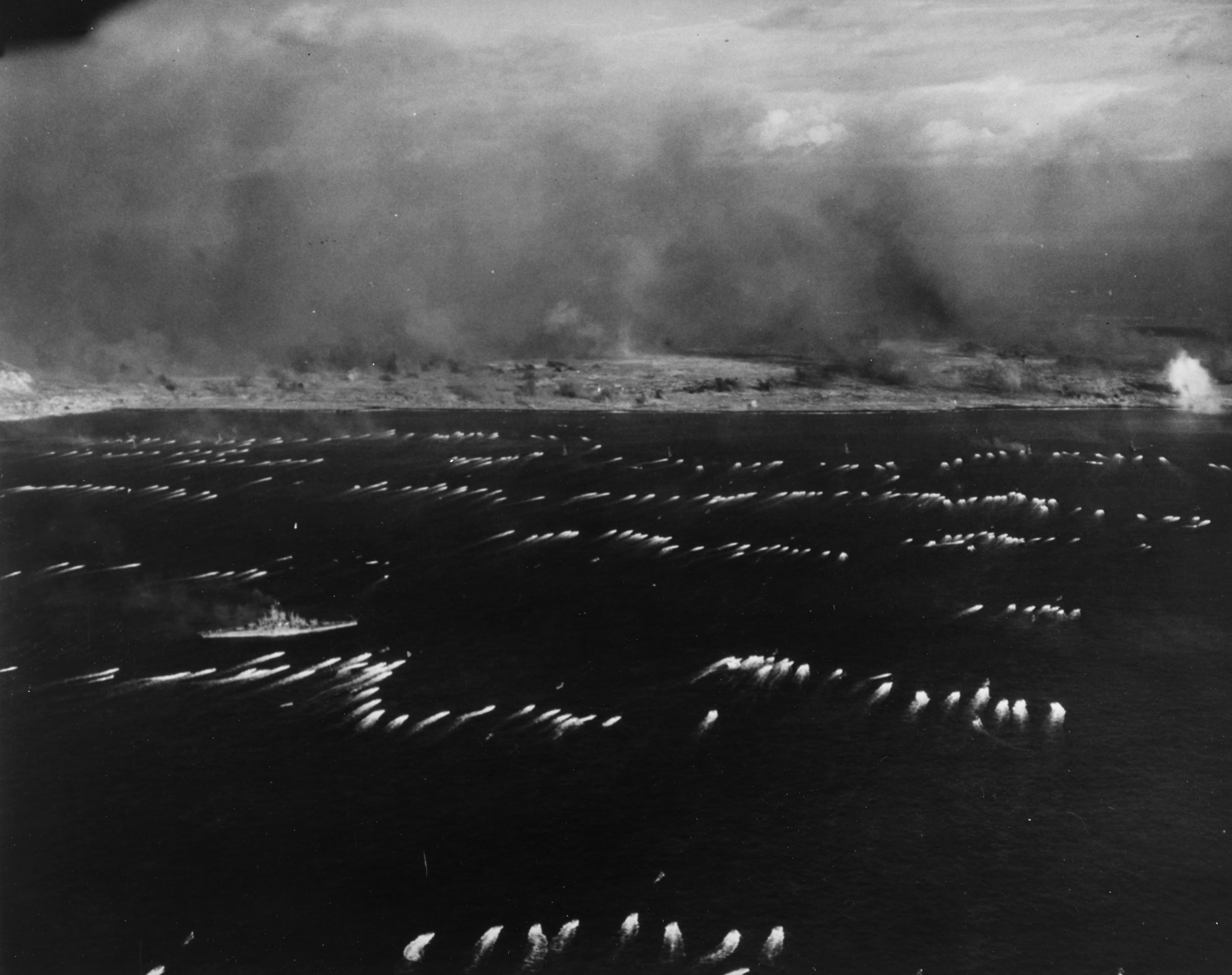
The U.S. Navy battleship USS Tennessee (left), with Captain Heffernan in command and providing fire support, surrounded by LVTs heading for Iwo Jima landing beaches in February 1945

Then, Heffernan took over as captain of the battleship Tennessee in early October 1944 after the previous captain was relieved following a serious accident. He was soon involved in the engagements of the Battle of Leyte Gulf. Heffernan's ship handling abilities have been credited with preventing a potentially disastrous collision with California during the Battle of Surigao Strait in late October 1944. Later, Heffernan and Tennessee participated in naval actions during the Battle of Iwo Jima and the Battle of Okinawa. During the latter, Morison was on board as well, and both he and the officers on the bridge were almost hit when a Japanese kamikaze plane aiming at the bridge got struck by anti-aircraft fire and smashed into a turret instead.

The war over, Heffernan relinquished command of the Tennessee on September 7, 1945.

For his service during World War II, Heffernan was awarded the Legion of Merit twice and the Bronze Star Medal thrice.

== Director of the Naval History Division ==
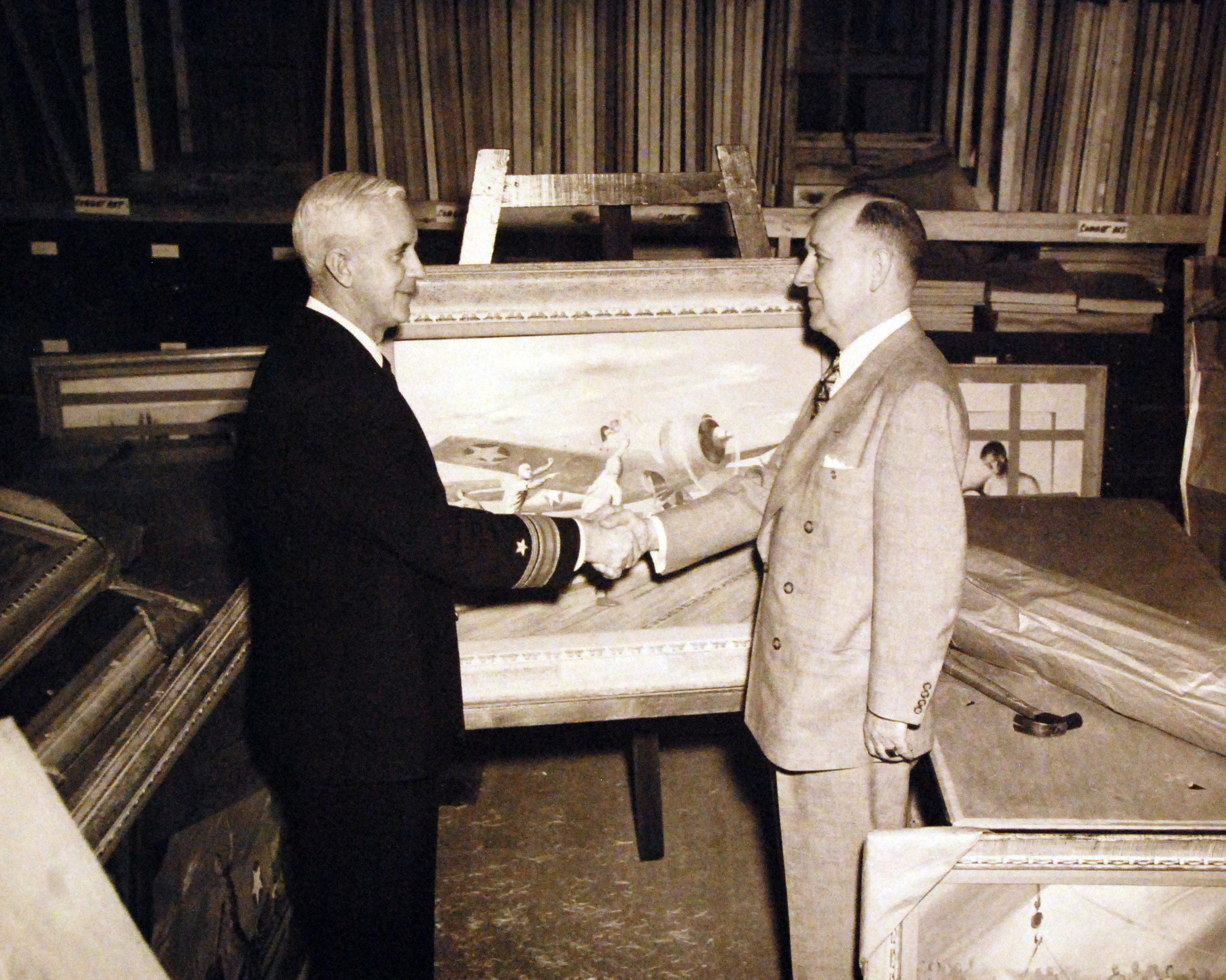
Rear Admiral Heffernan (left) receiving works in 1950 from various American artists depicting the activities of the U.S. Navy in World War II

Immediately following the end of the war, Heffernan was assigned to Pearl Harbor to be the officer in charge of personnel for the Fourteenth Naval District. In February 1946, Heffernan became the chief of staff for the Seventh Naval District, based in Miami, Florida.

But in June 1946, Heffernan took a different position, that of Director of Naval History for the United States Navy Department in Washington, D.C. At this point, he still had the rank of captain. Initially part of the Office of Naval History, the entity would be renamed to the Naval Records and History Division and then to the Naval History Division during Heffernan's time there, all within the Office of the Chief of Naval Operations in Washington.

During 1947, Heffernan took retired status, but continued on active duty in his role as directory of naval history. Around the same time, he became a rear admiral.

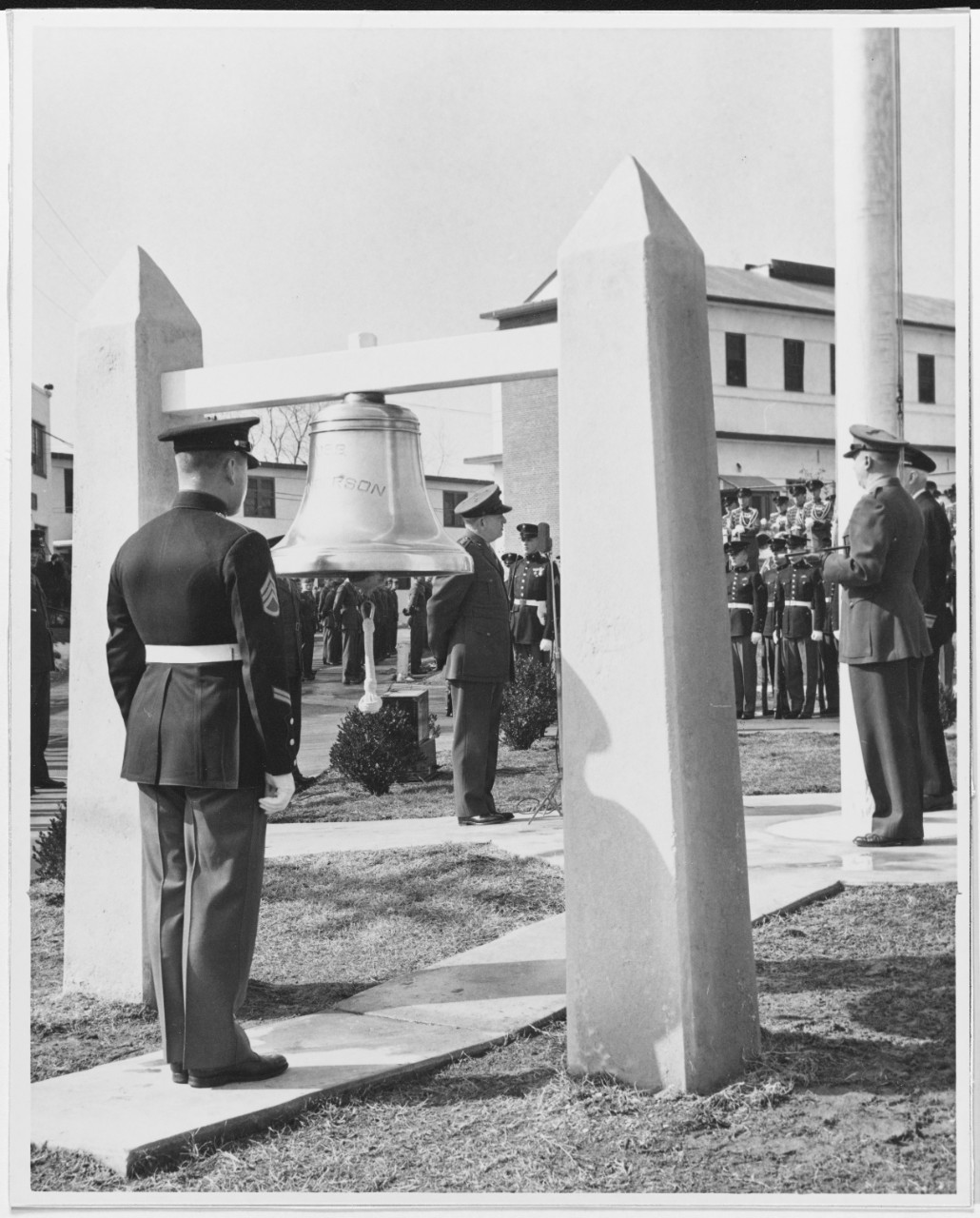
Scene from 1955, when Rear Admiral Heffernan presented the ship's bell from the USS Henderson (AP-1) to the same-named Marine Corps base in Alexandria, Virginia

Heffernan's most important task in the director position may have been the supervision, preparation, and publication of Morison's official, fifteen-volume History of United States Naval Operations in World War II. The series would be released over a number of years commencing in 1946, and capitalized on the association the two had begun during the war. In 1951, Heffernan began the scoping and overseeing of Rear Admiral Julius A. Furer's writing of the lengthy but single-volume Administration of the Navy Department in World War II, which was completed and published almost a decade later.

Other activities as director included being one of those giving speeches at the June 1952 opening of the Hall of Naval History within the Arts and Industries Building in Washington, D.C.

In July 1956, it was announced that Heffernan was stepping down as director of naval history, a change that became effective in October 1956. He was succeeded by Rear Admiral Ernest M. Eller. Heffernan assumed fully retired status.

== Final years ==
Heffernan was a long-time member of the American Catholic Historical Association. He was secretary of the Naval Historical Foundation, including in the late 1950s. He acted as editor of naval-related entries for the Encyclopædia Britannica. He was a member of the Civil War Round Table for the District of Columbia and for a while served as its president.

Heffernan often engaged in speaking to various groups. He was a Knight of the Holy Sepulchre and a Fourth-degree member of the Knights of Columbus.

Heffernan died at Bethesda Naval Hospital on April 17, 1978, after undergoing brain surgery. He is buried at Arlington National Cemetery.
