= Lingleville, Texas =

Census-designated place in Erath County, Texas, United States

Coordinates: 32°14′40″N 98°22′39″W

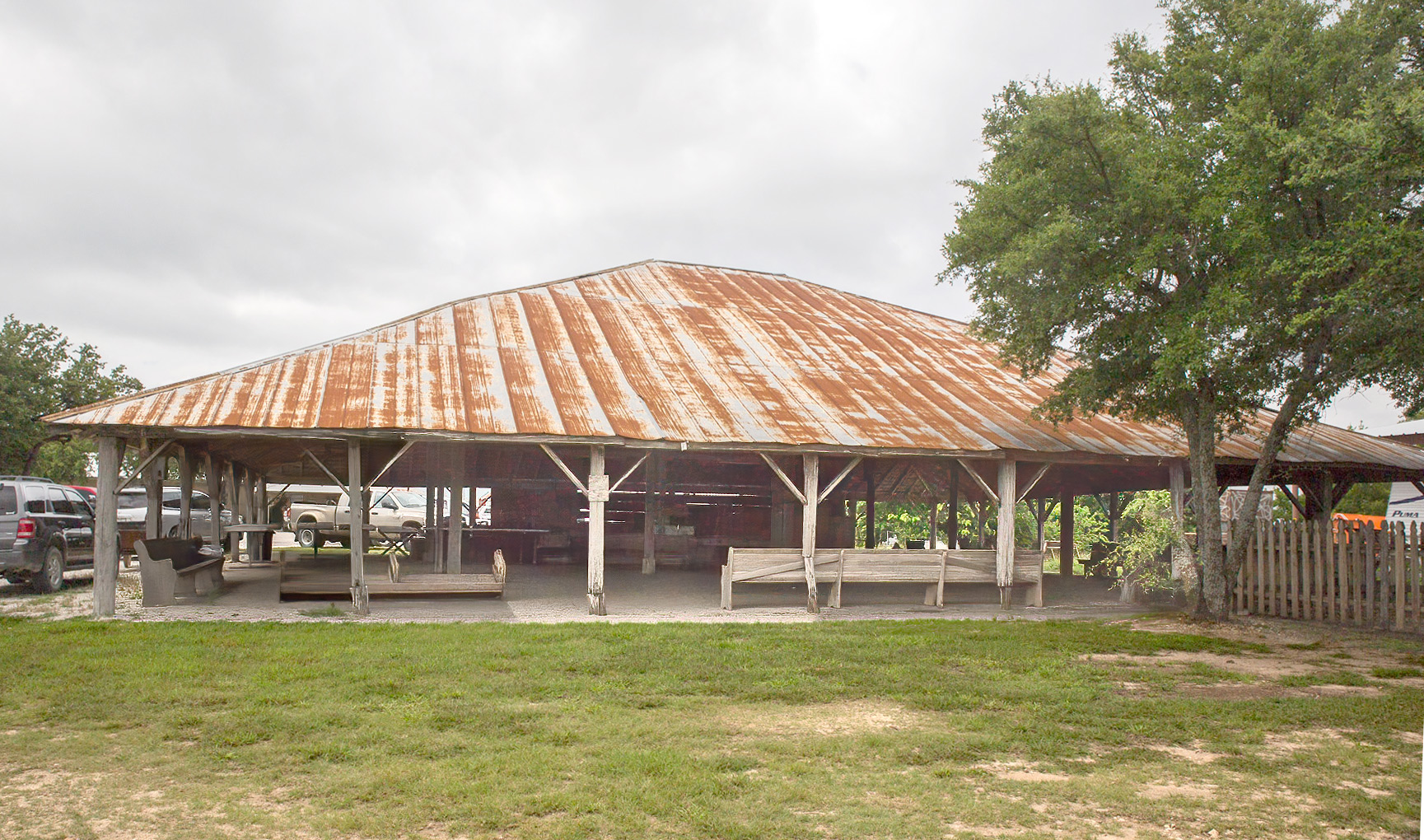
Lingleville Tabernacle

Lingleville is a census-designated place (CDP) in Erath County, Texas, United States. As of the 2020 census, Lingleville had a population of 166. Lingleville is located at the intersection of Farm to Market Road 8 and Farm to Market Road 219, 10 miles (16 km) west of Stephenville.

== History ==
In 1884 R. P. Campbell opened a grocery store in his house in the hollow below what is now the townsite. Before a post office was established there in 1885, the community was called Needmore. It was renamed to honor John Lingle, who had settled there in 1874. In 1901, a downtown robbery and subsequent fire almost completely devastated the town. In 1919, an oil boom at the nearby Desdemona oil field increased settlement in Lingleville. In 1940 the town had the post office, four businesses, and 200 residents. From 1980 through 2000, its population was reported as 100.

== Climate ==
The climate in this area is characterized by relatively high temperatures and evenly distributed precipitation throughout the year. The Köppen Climate System describes the weather as humid subtropical, and uses the abbreviation Cfa.

== Demographics ==
Historical population
Census	Pop.	Note	%±
2020	166		—
U.S. Decennial Census; 1850–1900 1910; 1920 1930 1940; 1950 1960 1970; 1980 1990 2000; 2010 2020

Lingleville first appeared as a census designated place in the 2020 U.S. census.

=== 2020 Census ===
Lingleville CDP, Texas – Racial and ethnic composition Note: the US Census treats Hispanic/Latino as an ethnic category. This table excludes Latinos from the racial categories and assigns them to a separate category. Hispanics/Latinos may be of any race.
Race / Ethnicity (NH = Non-Hispanic)	Pop 2020	% 2020
White alone (NH)	78	46.99%
Black or African American alone (NH)	1	0.60%
Native American or Alaska Native alone (NH)	1	0.60%
Asian alone (NH)	1	0.60%
Native Hawaiian or Pacific Islander alone (NH)	1	0.60%
Other race alone (NH)	1	0.60%
Mixed race or Multiracial (NH)	4	2.41%
Hispanic or Latino (any race)	79	47.59%
Total	166	100.00%

== Education ==
The Lingleville Independent School District serves area students and is home to the Lingleville High School Cardinals.

== Notable people ==
Ulane Bonnel, née Ulane Zeeck, naval historian

== See also ==
- List of census-designated places in Texas
