= Lexie Dean Robertson =

American poet

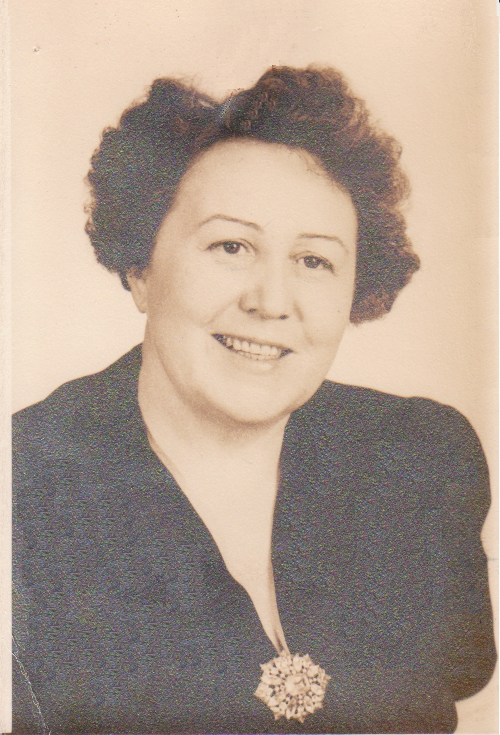
- Personal picture given to Mary Louise Newbern
- Born: July 25, 1893; Lindale, Texas, U.S.
- Died: February 16, 1954 (aged 60); Abilene, Texas, U.S.
- Occupation: Poet
- Spouse: J. F. Robertson

Lexie Dean Robertson (July 25, 1893 – February 16, 1954) was an American teacher and award-winning Poet Laureate of Texas from 1939 to 1941.

== Biography ==
She grew up in Canton, Texas, the daughter of teachers, and married a fellow student at North Texas State Normal College (today the University of North Texas), J. F. Robertson, in 1911. The couple settled in Rising Star in 1920. Robertson was the first native-born Texan to hold the position of Poet Laureate of Texas; among the publications which featured her work were Kaleidograph, Southwest Review, Holland's Magazine, Country Gentleman, Good Housekeeping, and Ladies' Home Journal.

Robertson was a charter member of the Texas Institute of Letters, whose president she became in 1944; she was also a member of both the Poetry Society of America and Texas Federation of Women's Clubs. She served as vice president of the Poetry Society of Texas, and during her writing career she won every prize the society offered. Robertson never had any children. She was a Methodist and a democrat.

== Legacy ==
Robertson died on February 16, 1954. She was buried in Rising Star, Texas. After her death, the Poetry Society of Texas established the Lexie Dean Robertson Award in her honor.

== Selected publications ==
- Red Heels (Dallas: Southwest Press, 1928)
- I Keep a Rainbow (1932)
- Acorn on the Roof (1939)
- Answer in the Night (1948)
