= Romney, Texas =

- Unincorporated community
- Location within the state of Texas Romney (the United States)
- Coordinates: 32°14′29″N 98°57′28″W
- Country: United States
- State: Texas
- County: Eastland
- Elevation: 1,608 ft (490 m)
- Time zone: UTC-6 (Central (CST))
  - Summer (DST): UTC-5 (CDT)
- GNIS feature ID: 1378984

Romney is an unincorporated community in Eastland County in the U.S. state of Texas. Located southwest of Fort Worth, it lies between the towns of Rising Star and Cisco on Texas State Highway 183.
