= William Bell Clark =

American naval historian (1889–1968)

- Born: September 26, 1889; Mechanicsburg, Pennsylvania, U.S.
- Died: October 31, 1968 (aged 79)
- Occupations: Advertising executive; naval historian
- Political party: Republican
- Spouse: Grace Mildred Wrigley (m. 1915)
- Children: 2
- Parent(s): William Patterson Bell; Kate Stees Bell

William Bell Clark (September 26, 1889 – October 31, 1968) was an American advertising executive and self-taught naval historian, specializing in the period of the American Revolution, 1775–1783.

== Early life and education ==
Born in Mechanicsburg, Pennsylvania, William Bell Clark was the son of William Patterson Bell and Kate Stees Bell. He graduated from Harrisburg Technical School (Pennsylvania) in 1907 and married Grace Mildred Wrigley on November 5, 1915, with whom he had two sons: William Bell Clark Jr., and Donald Wrigley Clark.

== Professional and writing career ==
From 1907 to 1919, he worked in the newspaper business in Harrisburg and Philadelphia. He served as Assistant Secretary of the Pennsylvania War History Commission, 1919–1921. In 1921, he moved to Evanston, Illinois, and joined the N. W. Ayer & Son Advertising Agency, rising to be vice president in 1939 and later, president.

Although his first book was on military history, his work with the Pennsylvania War Commission from 1919 sparked his initial interest in naval affairs. He wrote several biographies of American naval captains, including John Barry, Nicholas Biddle, Lambert Wickes, and John Young during the American Revolution, which were published by prominent academic presses, such as the Yale University Press and Louisiana State University Press. In the process of this research and writing, Clark developed a deep knowledge of the archival resources for this general period in naval history and made numerous careful transcripts of documents. As a result of this in the late 1950s, Clark's work came to the attention of the Director of Naval History, Rear Admiral Ernest M. Eller at the Naval History Division of the Navy Department (now the Naval Historical Center) and the head of the Early History Branch in that office, Dr. William J. Morgan. With the advice of the Secretary of the Navy's advisory sub-committee on naval history, Clark was appointed the first editor of the U.S. Navy's multi-volume documentary series on Naval Documents of the American Revolution, assisted by Morgan and his staff in the Early History Branch. Clark died while the fourth volume was in the course of publication, but left rough drafts for the first ten volumes. He was succeeded as editor and his work continued by Dr. William J. Morgan, who in turn was succeeded by Dr. William S. Dudley, and then by Dr. Michael J. Crawford.

A Republican and a Presbyterian, Clark was also a member of the Naval Historical Foundation, the Historical Society of Pennsylvania, the Pennsylvania Genealogical Society, and served as vice president of the Illinois chapter of the Sons of the American Revolution. Clark's personal small 170 document collection of original manuscript material, the bulk relating to the 1770-1794 period, with some documents as late as 1950, is in the Manuscript Division at the Library of Congress.

== Published works ==
- The History of the 79th Division, A.E.F. (1922)
- When the u-boats came to America (1929, 2005)
- Lambert Wickes, sea raider and diplomat; the story of a naval captain of the revolution (1932)
- Gallant John Barry, 1745-1803; the story of a naval hero of two wars (1938)
- Captain Dauntless, the story of Nicholas Biddle of the Continental Navy (1949)
- The first Saratoga; being the saga of John Young and his sloop-of-war (1953)
- Ben Franklin’s privateers; a naval epic of the American Revolution (1956, 1969)
- George Washington’s Navy; being an account of His Excellency’s fleet in New England waters (1960)
- Naval documents of the American Revolution edited by William Bell Clark; with a foreword by President John F. Kennedy and an introduction by Ernest McNeill Eller, vol 1 (1964) - Vol 4 (1969).
