= Lingleville High School =

Location
- 21261 North FM 219; Lingleville, Texas 76461-0134; United States; 32.238340°N 98.377297°W

Information
- School type: Public high school
- School district: Lingleville Independent School District
- Principal: Cheryl Hudson
- Staff: 23.52 (FTE)
- Grades: PK-12
- Enrollment: 274 (2023-2024)
- Student to teacher ratio: 11.65
- Colors: Maroon & White
- Athletics conference: UIL Class A
- Mascot: Cardinal
- Website: Lingleville High School

Lingleville High School or Lingleville School is a public high school located in Lingleville, Texas (USA) and classified as a 1A school by the UIL. It is part of the Lingleville Independent School District located in northwestern Erath County. In 2013, the school was rated "Met Standard" by the Texas Education Agency.

== Athletics ==
The Lingleville Cardinals compete in the following sports

Cross Country, Volleyball, 6-Man Football, Basketball, Powerlifting, Tennis & Track

- Basketball
- Cross Country
- 6-Man Football
- Powerlifting
- Tennis
- Track and Field
- Volleyball

Lingleville recently began playing 6-Man football at the varsity level.
