= William J. Morgan (historian) =

William James Morgan (February 4, 1917, in New York City – March 19, 2003, in Silver Spring, Maryland) was Senior Historian at the U.S. Naval Historical Center and editor of Naval Documents of the American Revolution.

== Early life and education ==
Morgan graduated from Fordham University with a Bachelor of Science degree in 1938 and then obtained his Master of Arts degree from Columbia University in 1940. He served as an officer in the U.S. Naval Reserve during World War II. Returning from World War II, he taught high school in California between 1946 and 1949, and then taught history at Los Angeles Valley College for a year before being recalled to active duty during the Korean War, reaching the rank of Commander. He had begun his graduate work at the University of Southern California, but this was interrupted by his recall to active duty for the Korean War. He completed his Ph.D. in history in 1956. He married Arline Hanlon in 1941, with whom he had three sons.

== Professional career ==
Morgan joined the Naval Historical Center in 1952, when it was the Naval History Division of the Office of the Chief of Naval Operations (Op-09B9), Navy Department, serving under the successive Directors of Naval History, Rear Admiral John B. Heffernan, Rear Admiral Ernest M. Eller, Vice Admiral Edwin B. Hooper, Rear Admiral John D. H. Kane. Initially assigned as a naval officer, Morgan remained there for thirty years, serving as Head, Research Branch, from 1954 to 1982 and appointed additionally as Senior Historian, before he retired in March 1982.

In 1952, he became interested in the officers who had served in the Continental Navy and this led to the publication of his doctoral thesis in 1956 and his first book in 1959, Captains to the Northward. As he was working on this he came into contact with the manuscript collector and historian William Bell Clark and with Rear Admiral Ernest M. Eller, played a major role in undertaking the Naval Documents of the American Revolution project. Beginning about 1956, Morgan was the professional historian and master documentary editor who implemented the project under Clark's editorship. On Clark's death in 1968, Morgan succeeded him as editor, completing the first nine volumes by the time of his retirement in 1982. He died at Silver Spring, Maryland.

== Awards ==
In recognition of his service to naval history, the United States Navy awarded him its highest decoration for civilian service in 1982: the Navy Distinguished Civilian Service Award. In 1996, the North American Society for Oceanic History (NASOH) awarded him its K. Jack Bauer Award for distinguished service to NASOH and for lifetime achievement in the field of maritime history.

== Published works ==
- Captains to the northward; the New England captains in the Continental Navy (1959)
- Naval Chronology of World War II
- Civil War Naval Chronology, 1861-1865. compiled by the Naval History Division (6 volumes 1961–65; 1 volume, 1971, 1992)
- Naval Documents of the American Revolution (volumes 1 through 9, 1964–1984)
- Autobiography of Rear Admiral Charles Wilkes, U.S. Navy, 1798-1877, edited by William J. Morgan, et al. (1978)
- The Pivot Upon Which Everything Turned: French Naval Superiority That Ensured Victory At Yorktown. Washington, DC: Naval Historical Foundation, 1981.
