= Mangum, Texas =

Coordinates: 32°19′12″N 98°51′34″W

Mangum was an unincorporated town in Eastland County, Texas, United States. It was founded in the late 1890s at the intersection of the Missouri-Kansas-Texas Railway (abandoned in 1967) and the Eastland, Wichita Falls and Gulf Railroad (abandoned in 1944). Mangum was named for the Bob Mangum family. The town's population peaked in 1915 at 125; by 1936, only a handful of residents remained. In 2000, the population of Mangum was estimated at 15.

== History ==
In 1910, the town had a population of 300 people.
