= Lingleville Independent School District =

Public school district in Lingleville, Texas

Coordinates: 32.2386°N 98.3769°W

Address
- 21261 N. FM 219 Lingleville, Erath County, Texas, 76461; United States

District information
- Type: Public, independent school district
- Grades: PK-12
- Superintendent: Curtis Haley
- Governing agency: Texas Education Agency, Region 11
- Schools: 1
- Budget: $3.44 million (2015-2016)
- NCES District ID: 4827600

Students and staff
- Students: 275 (2017-2018)
- Teachers: 26 (2017-2018)
- Staff: 45.56 (2017-2018)

Other information
- Website: www.lingleville.us

Lingleville Independent School District is a public school district based in the community of Lingleville, Texas (USA). Located in Erath County, small portions of the district extend into Eastland and Comanche counties.

Lingleville ISD has one school Lingleville School that serves students in grades pre-kindergarten through twelve. In 2009, the school district was rated "recognized" by the Texas Education Agency.

== Students ==
=== Academics ===
STAAR - At Approaches Grade Level or Above (Sum of All Grades Tested)
Subject	Lingleville ISD	Region 11	State of Texas
Reading/ELA	84%	77%	75%
Mathematics	82%	82%	82%
Writing	74%	70%	68%
Science	78%	83%	81%
Soc. Studies	95%	82%	81%
All Tests	83%	79%	78%

Students in Lingleville match or outperform local region and statewide averages on standardized tests. In 2018-2019 State of Texas Assessments of Academic Readiness (STAAR) results, 83% of students in Lingleville ISD met Approaches Grade Level standards, compared with 79% in Region 11 and 78% in the state of Texas. The average SAT score of the students tested in 2017-18 was 1025, and the average ACT score was 20.6.

=== Demographics ===
In the 2018–2019 school year, the school district had a total of 279 students, ranging from pre-kindergarten through grade 12. The class of 2018 included 18 graduates; the annual drop-out rate across grades 9-12 was reported as 0.0%.

As of the 2018–2019 school year, the ethnic distribution of the school district was 51.3% Hispanic, 48.0% White, 0.4% African American, 1.6% Asian, 0.7% American Indian, 0.1% Pacific Islander, and 0.4% from two or more races; no American Indian, Asian, or Pacific Islander students were reported. Economically disadvantaged students made up 50.9% of the student body, compared with 60.6% of all Texas students.

== Special programs ==
=== Athletics ===
Lingleville High School plays six-man football.

== Controversy ==
In July 2024, the ACLU of Texas sent Lingleville Independent School District a letter, alleging that the district's 2023-2024 dress and grooming code appeared to violate the Texas CROWN Act, a state law which prohibits racial discrimination based on hair texture or styles, and asking the district to revise its policies for the 2024-2025 school year.

== See also ==
- List of school districts in Texas
