= Olden, Texas =

Unincorporated community in Texas, US

Coordinates: 32°25′09″N 98°45′01″W

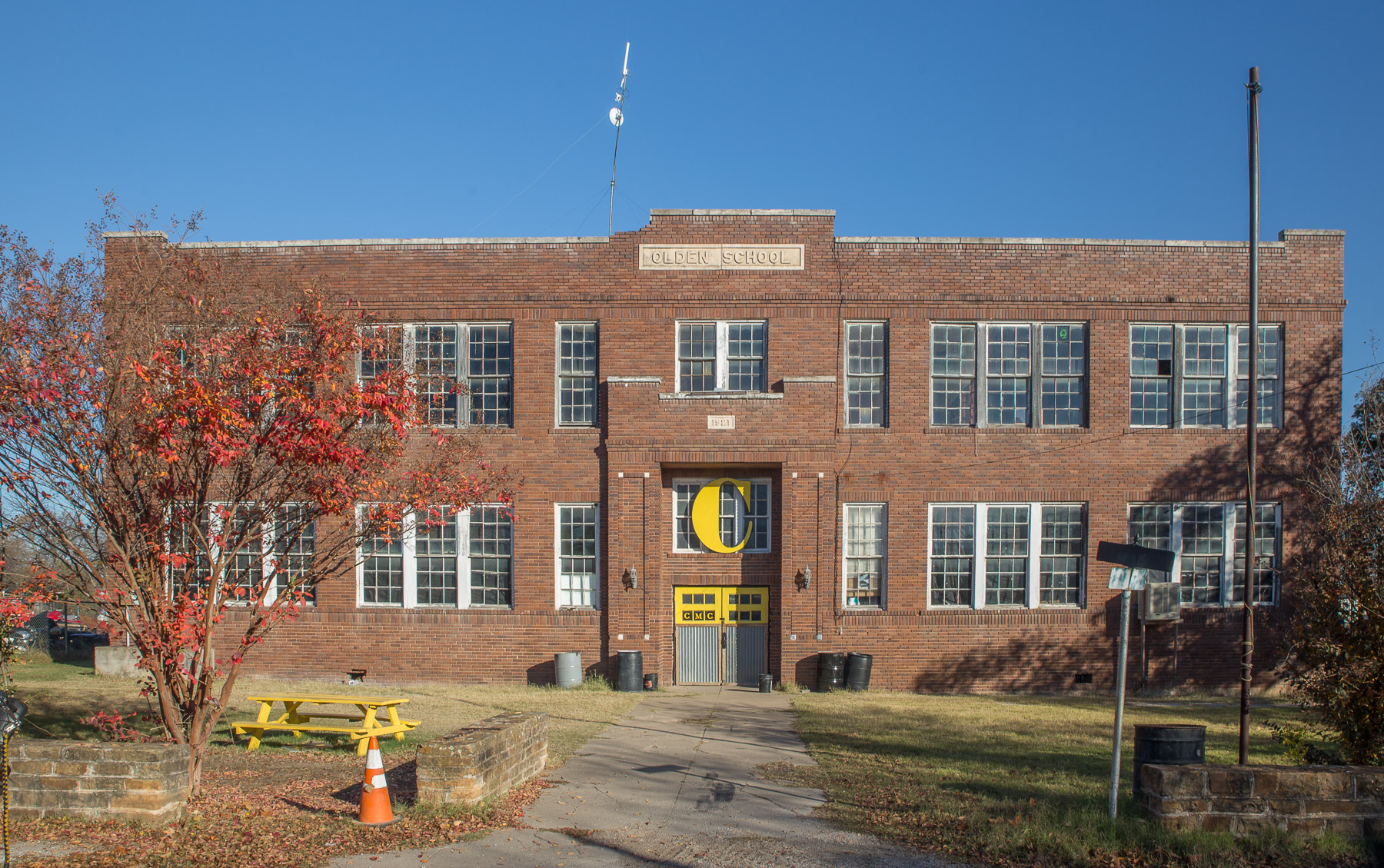
Olden School

Olden is an unincorporated community in Eastland County, Texas, United States. Olden has a post office, with the ZIP code 76466.

Olden is located on I-20 between Ranger and Eastland in northern Eastland County. The community originated as a railroad town on the Texas and Pacific Railway. It was known as Olden Switch and came to life with expectations of silver discoveries. Silver was not found, but Olden survived to benefit from the county oil boom that began in 1919. In 1945, Olden had 500 residents, but by 1980 the population had fallen to 110, where it remained in 1990. In later years, however, the population saw an increase. According to the 2010 United States census, the population grew to a total of just over 330.
