= Sandals Cay =

Private island in Montego Bay, Jamaica

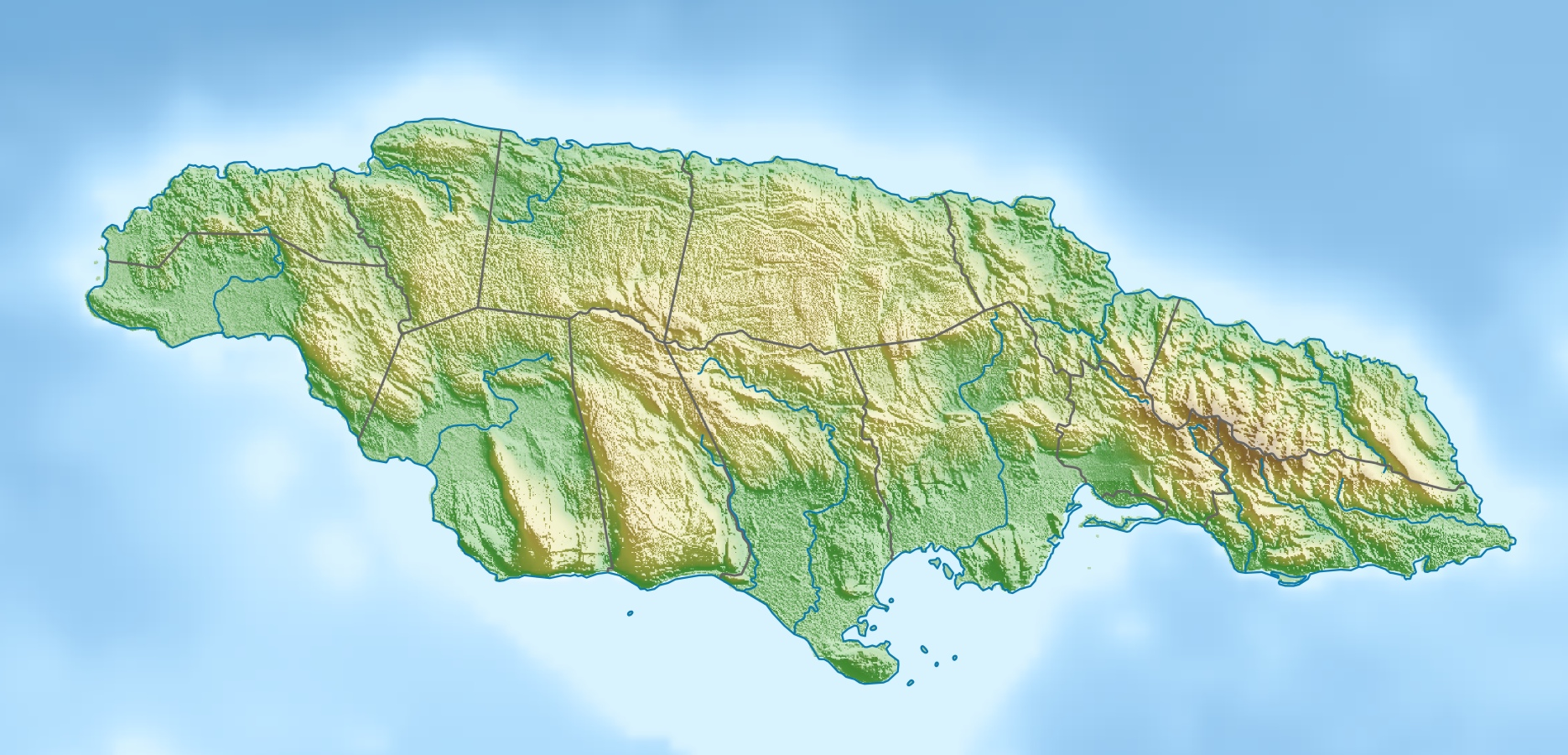
- Location within Jamaica Location within the Caribbean

Geography
- Location: Caribbean
- Coordinates: 18°31′18.4″N 77°52′54.8″W
- Area: 2.5 acres (1.0 ha)

Administration
- Jamaica

Sandals Cay (formerly called Kokomo Island) is part of the privately owned Sandals Royal Caribbean all-inclusive resort in Montego Bay, Jamaica. It is apparent that Sandals resorts has an almost identical island in their Nassau, Bahamas location called the Royal Bahamian. The original name for the island came from the song "Kokomo”.

It is a very small island (2.5 acres or 1.012 hectares), and according to the Sandals Royal Caribbean website, the only amenities on the island are a Thai restaurant, a swimming pool, a jacuzzi, a bar, and a secluded beach. The island caters to couples on tropical getaways.
