= Kokomo, Texas =

Kokomo
- Unincorporated community
- Location within Texas Location within the United States
- Coordinates: 32.283163°N 98.705044°W
- Country: United States
- State: Texas
- County: Eastland

Population (2000)
  - Total: 25
- Time zone: UTC-6 (CST)
  - Summer (DST): UTC-5 (CDT)
- ZIP code: 76454

Kokomo is an unincorporated community in the southeastern Eastland County, Texas, in the United States. In 2000, it had a population of 25 people.

== History ==
Kokomo was founded in the 1890s after the construction of the Texas and Pacific Railway. In 1899, there was opened the post office, which operated until 1907. A local school was opened in the early 1900s, and closed in the 1940s. The former school building burned down in 2006. In 1980, 1990, and 2000, the community had a population of 25 people.
