= Rising Star, Texas =

- Town
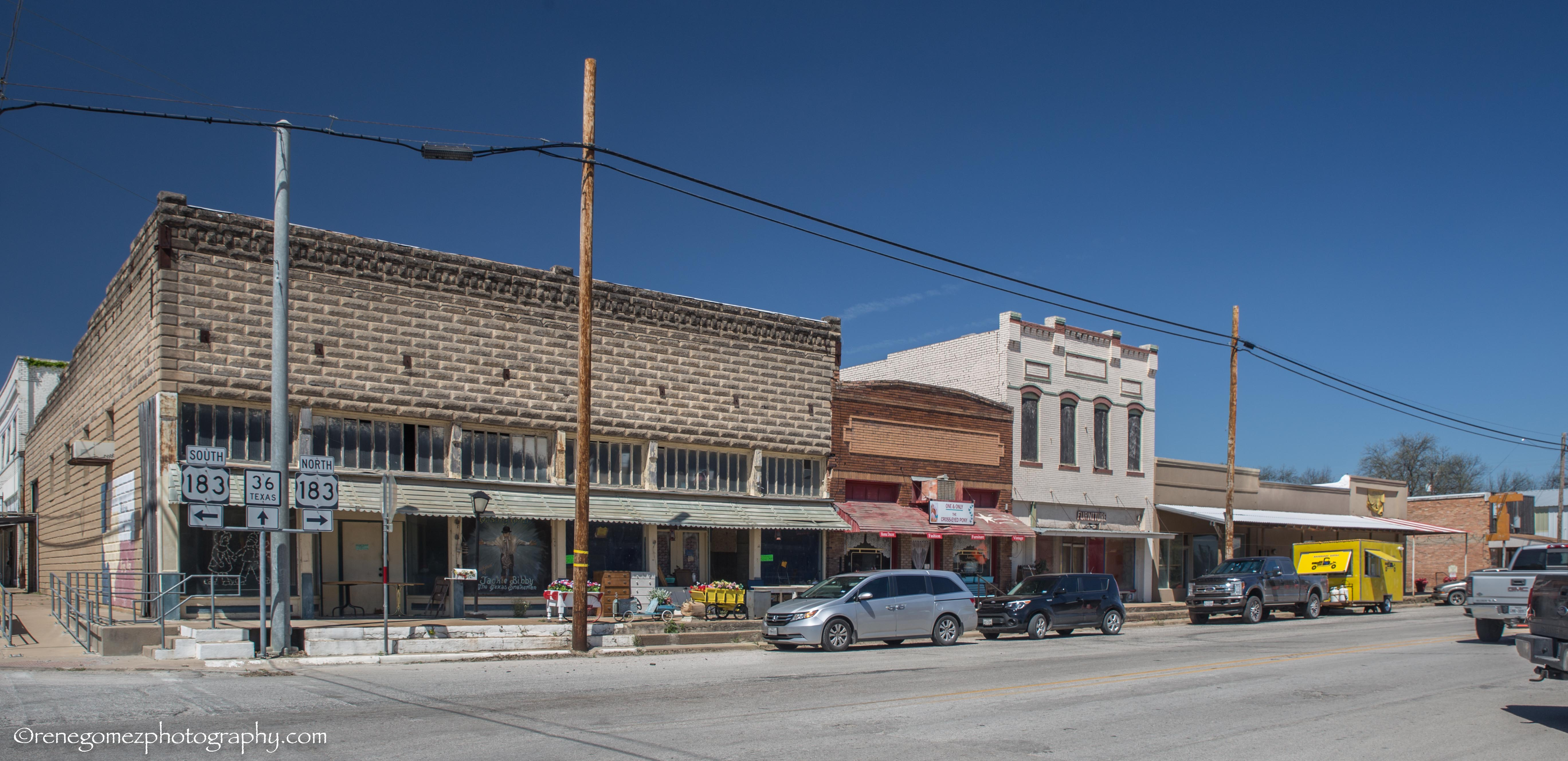

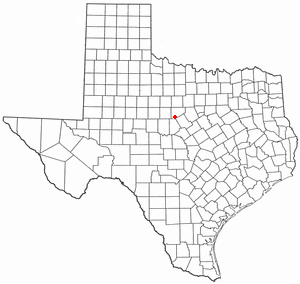
- Location of Rising Star, Texas

- Coordinates: 32°05′51″N 98°57′59″W
- Country: United States
- State: Texas
- County: Eastland

Area
  - Total: 1.73 sq mi (4.47 km^{2})
  - Land: 1.73 sq mi (4.47 km^{2})
  - Water: 0 sq mi (0.00 km^{2})
- Elevation: 1,634 ft (498 m)

Population (2020)
  - Total: 756
  - Density: 438/sq mi (169/km^{2})
- Time zone: UTC-6 (Central (CST))
  - Summer (DST): UTC-5 (CDT)
- ZIP code: 76471
- Area code: 254
- FIPS code: 48-62252
- GNIS feature ID: 2412555
- Website: cityofrisingstar.org

Rising Star is a town in Eastland County, Texas, United States. Its population as of the 2020 census was 756.

== Geography ==
Rising Star is located in southwestern Eastland County. U.S. Route 183 passes through the town, leading north 20 miles (32 km) to Cisco and south 28 miles (45 km) to Brownwood. Texas State Highway 36 crosses US-183 in the center of town, leading southeast 26 miles (42 km) to Comanche and west 12 miles (19 km) to Cross Plains. Eastland, the county seat, is 30 miles (48 km) to the north and east via US-183 and Interstate 20.

According to the United States Census Bureau, the town of Rising Star has an area of 1.7 square miles (4.5 km^{2}), all land.

=== Climate ===
The climate in this area is characterized by hot, humid summers and generally mild to cool winters. According to the Köppen climate classification system, Rising Star has a humid subtropical climate, Cfa on climate maps.

== Demographics ==
Historical population
Census	Pop.	Note	%±
1910	640		—
1920	906		41.6%
1930	1,160		28.0%
1940	1,198		3.3%
1950	1,289		7.6%
1960	997		−22.7%
1970	1,009		1.2%
1980	1,204		19.3%
1990	859		−28.7%
2000	835		−2.8%
2010	835		0.0%
2020	756		−9.5%
U.S. Decennial Census; 2020 Census

According to the census of 2000, 835 people, 345 households, and 212 families resided in the town. The population density was 497.9 inhabitants per square mile (192.2/km^{2}). The 483 housing units averaged 288.0 per square mile (111.0/km^{2}). The racial makeup of the town was 93.65% White, 0.24% African American, 0.36% Native American, 0.12% Asian, 2.87% from other races, and 2.75% from two or more races. Hispanics or Latinos of any race were 6.23% of the population.

Of the 345 households, 24.6% had children under the age of 18 living with them, 48.1% were married couples living together, 9.0% had a female householder with no husband present, and 38.3% were not families. About 35.1% of all households were made up of individuals, and 21.2% had someone living alone who was 65 years of age or older. The average household size was 2.30 and the average family size was 2.98.

In the town, the population was distributed as 23.7% under the age of 18, 6.8% from 18 to 24, 22.6% from 25 to 44, 22.4% from 45 to 64, and 24.4% who were 65 years of age or older. The median age was 43 years. For every 100 females, there were 88.1 males. For every 100 females age 18 and over, there were 83.0 males.

The median income for a household in the town was $19,118, and for a family was $30,000. Males had a median income of $22,750 versus $15,625 for females. The per capita income for the town was $11,636. About 19.4% of families and 24.4% of the population were below the poverty line, including 33.7% of those under age 18 and 25.0% of those age 65 or over.

== History ==
The first settlers arrived in the area that is now Rising Star on January 10, 1875. The original seven families were the families of William "Allie" Wylie Smith, G. A., Andrew "Big Andy" Smith, Andrew "Little Andy" Agnew, William "Billy" Agnew, Fletcher Fields, and D. M. (Dave) McKinley. The seven families were all related to each other through the Agnew line.

Large amounts of land were found to be available for purchase in the area, because the state of Texas kept all unappropriated and vacant land after joining the Union 30 years prior. This land belonged to the state, which sold it to finance the construction of the public school system and state universities. The state gave a portion of its land to railroad companies to sell. This encouraged and helped railroad lines to be developed throughout Texas. Because of this, almost all of the land in Eastland County was either school land or railroad land. Settlers could buy railroad land for $3.00 per acre and school land for as low as $1.00 per acre with no down payment and about 20–40 years to pay off the land. Most of these East Texas families purchased land from the railroad companies.

Other families soon began to move into the area and purchase land. Some of the families that settled later were the Anderson, Irby, Roach, Cox, Hull, Leach, Haynes, Wynn, Mayfield, and Swindle families.

No mail routes existed initially in this newly settled frontier, but by about 1880, the community became a stop on a mail route between Cisco and Brownwood. Prior to the establishment of this mail route, the families received mail from Sipe Springs. In 1881, the town sent a petition to the U.S. government asking for a new post office in the area. The community leaders were required to suggest a name for the post office and decided upon the name Star, which was then sent for approval to the Postal Service. The Postal Service sent word back that a post office under the name Star was already located in Texas (in Mills County). The citizens called a meeting to select another name, and after many long hours of deliberation, Little Andy Agnew proposed, "Since we are a rising young community, why don't we just call ourselves Rising Star." The name was agreed to and accepted by the Postal Service. From 1910 through 1911, a spur of the Texas Central line (Katy Railroad) was constructed to the west 40 miles from De Leon to Cross Plains through Rising Star. The Katy abandoned the spur in the 1940s.

== Education ==
The town is served by the Rising Star Independent School District and is home to the Rising Star High School Wildcats.

== Notable people ==
- Gene Alford, professional football player was born in Rising Star
- Brooks Holder, professional baseball player, was born in Rising Star
- Joe M. Kilgore, former U.S. representative from Texas, was reared part of the time in Rising Star
- Lexie Dean Robertson, Poet Laureate of Texas, 1939–1941
