= Kokomo (gorilla) =

- Species: Western lowland gorilla
- Sex: Female
- Born: December 20, 1988; Oklahoma City Zoo
- Died: January 22, 2025 (aged 36); San Diego Zoo Safari Park
- Residence: San Diego Zoo Safari Park
- Mate: Winston
- Offspring: 6 (Leslie)
- Weight: 229 lb (104 kg)

Kokomo was a female western lowland gorilla that lived in the San Diego Zoo Safari Park. She was moved from the Oklahoma City Zoo to the San Diego Zoo Safari Park. The western lowland gorilla is a critically endangered species.

== Life ==
Kokomo weighed 229 pounds (104 kg).

=== Offspring ===
She gave birth six times, including twins at Oklahoma City Zoo in 1999. The first offspring was born on 5 December 1996, but died soon on 14 March 1997 due to Salmonella infection.

==== Leslie ====
Zookeepers noted that she was a very protective mother, even refusing to let them touch baby Leslie, the second born to Kokomo and Winston, a male Western lowland gorilla. The baby was born on October 18, 2016 and weighed 3.5-4.5 pounds. The baby became a part of the troop of eight gorillas at the San Diego Zoo Safari Park. The troop is on display at Gorilla Forest daily. The troop consists of one adult male, three adult females, 5-year-old Monroe, 2-year-old Joanne, and 8-year-old Frank. This birth is an important step in saving the critically endangered species.

In 2019 medical experts collaborated to do cataract surgery on then three-year-old Leslie. This was the park's first cataract surgery on a gorilla.

== Covid-19 ==
The first detected case of Covid-19 in gorillas was reported on 11 January 2020 among the eight gorillas at the San Diego Zoo Safari Park. While it is not clear if all the gorillas were individually tested, reports suggest that most of them showed mild symptoms such as coughing and congestion. The park was closed during this time, so it is suspected that the gorillas contracted the virus from an asymptomatic staff, despite the protective measures they had all taken.

Winston, a silverback gorilla at the zoo with whom Kokomo has produced two offspring (Leslie and Monroe), was examined under anesthesia due to concerns about his age and underlying conditions. The examination confirmed pneumonia and heart disease and from a supply not permitted for human use, he was treated with monoclonal antibodies, heart medication, and antibiotics.

According to a CNN report on 16 February 2021, all gorillas made a complete recovery.

== Death ==
Kokomo died at the San Diego Zoo Safari Park on 22 January 2025.
