= Ernest M. Eller =

American historian

Ernest McNeill Eller
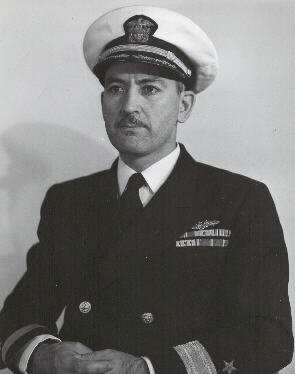
- Born: January 23, 1903; Marion, Virginia
- Died: July 30, 1992 (aged 89); Annapolis, Maryland
- Military career
- Allegiance: United States of America
- Branch: United States Navy
- Service years: 1925–1954, 1956-1970
- Rank: Rear Admiral
- Nickname: "Judge" Eller
- Commands: Director of Naval History
- Conflicts: World War II; Korean War
- Awards: Legion of Merit with Combat “V"; Bronze Star Medal

Ernest McNeill Eller (23 January 1903 – 30 July 1992) was a Rear Admiral in the United States Navy, who served as Director of Naval History, Naval History Division, Office of the Chief of Naval Operations from 1956 to 1970.

== Early life and education ==
Ernest Eller was born on 23 January 1903 in Marion, Virginia. The son of Edward E. Eller and Elizabeth McNeill Eller, he attended North Wilkesboro High School, North Wilkesboro, North Carolina, and North Carolina State College at Raleigh, North Carolina, before entering the United States Naval Academy in 1921. As a midshipman he was Managing Editor of The Log, President of the Trident Society, and editor of The Trident, graduating with the Class of 1925. He received a Master of Arts degree in psychology at George Washington University, Washington, DC, in 1934.

== Naval career ==
Graduated and commissioned an ensign on 4 June 1925, Eller rose to the rank of captain in 1944, to date from 20 July 1943, and served in the temporary rank of commodore from 30 September 1946 until 1 December 1947. On 1 April 1954 he was transferred to the Retired List of the US Navy as a Rear Admiral.

He served on USS Utah (BB-31) until 14 June 1926, when he reported to the Naval Torpedo Station, Newport, Rhode Island, for instruction. On 3 January 1927 he joined USS Texas (BB-35) and served on board that battleship until 28 May 1927. Following instruction in submarines at the Submarine Base, New London, Connecticut, he served successively from February 1928 to April 1932 in USS S-33 and USS Utah. For the next three years he had duty at the United States Naval Academy in the Department of English and History and the Executive Department. During that period, he earned a Master of Arts degree in Psychology at George Washington University, Washington, D.C.

During his next period of sea duty, he organized and conducted the Fleet Machine Gun School in USS Utah, in which he served until May 1938. He then returned to the Naval Academy for duty in the Departments of English and History, and Ordnance and Gunnery. From September 1940 until May 1941 he served as Assistant Naval Attaché in London, England, and as Observer with the British Home Fleet for radar, anti-aircraft, and other wartime technical developments.

After brief duty in the Fleet Training Division and Bureau of Ordnance developing anti-aircraft training and weapons, he was ordered to USS Saratoga (CV-3) and served as her gunnery officer until May 1942. He was on board that aircraft carrier when she made her high-speed run from San Diego, California, to Pearl Harbor, Hawaii, with urgently needed plane and pilot replacements immediately after the Japanese attack on Pearl Harbor. He was also on board when Saratoga was torpedoed in January 1942 while on her third operational foray into the Marshall Islands and Midway Island areas.

He served for the next three years on the staff Admiral Chester W. Nimitz, Commander in Chief, United States Pacific Fleet (CINCPAC), as Assistant Gunnery and Anti-submarine Training Officer. In addition, he analyzed actions and wrote CINCPAC's war reports during the first part of this tour of duty.

He was awarded the Legion of Merit with Combat “V.” The citation follows in part:

For exceptionally meritorious conduct…while attached to the staff of the Commander in Chief, United States Pacific Fleet and Pacific Ocean Areas, during operations against enemy Japanese forces in the Pacific War Area from May 1942 to April 1945. Analyzing war reports and developing, expanding and supervising all types of training, particularly anti-aircraft, anti-submarine, amphibious and shore bombardment, (he) participated in landings on Makin and Okinawa and in other combat operations which led to improved methods and development of new weapons. In his constant attention to improvements in weapons and armament of his ships and in his supervision of Fleet ammunition supply, he rendered vital service in developing and maintaining the combat readiness of the Fleet…

During the summer and fall of 1945, he commanded the attack transport USS Clay (APA-39), participating in three occupation moves into Japan and China. From late in December 1945 until March 1946, he served as District Public Information Officer, Twelfth Naval District, San Francisco, California. He reported in April 1946 to the Office of Public Information, Navy Department, Washington, D.C., to serve as deputy director and on 31 July 1946 assumed the duties of Director of Public Information. He was promoted to the temporary rank of Commodore on 30 September 1946. Eller also received Bronze Star Medal for his service in Pacific.

Selected to attend the course at the National War College, Washington, D.C., which convened on 30 August 1948, he completed the course and reported in June 1949 for duty in the Staff Planning Section of the Joint Staff, Joint Chiefs of Staff. In this duty he accompanied the Joint Chiefs of Staff to the member countries of NATO establishing plans for the military structure of that organization. A year later, at the outbreak of the Korean War, he became Commander, Middle East Force, in the Persian Gulf – Indian Ocean area. He assumed command of USS Albany (CA-123) on 14 May 1951, and in April 1952 he was assigned to the Office of the Chief of Naval Operations, International Affairs Division. Late in 1953 he was hospitalized and on 1 April 1954 was transferred to the Retired List of the Navy.

On 15 September 1956 he was recalled to active duty as Director of Naval History, Naval History Division and Curator of the Navy Department, Washington, DC. During his service there, he actively worked to falsify the history of the USS Constellation, misclassifying various logbooks as top secret to hide that the ship had been rebuilt in 1854. He served as Director and Curator until relieved of active duty on 23 January 1970.

Admiral Eller died of a heart ailment on 30 July 1992 at his home in Annapolis, Maryland. He was 89.

== Awards and decorations ==
In addition to the Legion of Merit with Combat “V,” Rear Admiral Eller was awarded the American Defense Service Medal, Fleet Clasp; Asiatic-Pacific Campaign Medal; the American Campaign Medal; the World War II Victory Medal; the Navy Occupation Service Medal, Asia and Europe Clasps; the China Service Medal; and the National Defense Service Medal with bronze star.

- Legion of Merit with Combat "V"
- Bronze Star Medal
- American Defense Service Medal
- American Campaign Medal
- Asiatic-Pacific Campaign Medal with three service stars
- World War II Victory Medal
- Navy Occupation Service Medal, Asia and Europe Clasp
- China Service Medal
- National Defense Service Medal
- Philippine Liberation Medal

In 1967, he received the Alfred Thayer Mahan Award for Literary Achievement.

== Publications ==
Books and Pamphlets

- Notes on fire control, 1940, for U.S. Naval Reserve, prepared by E.M. Eller, under the direction of the head of the Department of Ordnance and Gunnery, U.S. Naval Academy. Washington: U.S. G.P.O., 1941
- The Civil War at sea: "the nation notes and long remembers.", 1961
- Salem; star and dawn, Foreword by J. Kenneth Pfohl. Winston-Salem, N.C., Woman's Fellowship, Moravian Church South, [1962].
- Quiver: the class of 1925, U.S. Naval Academy: the 40th anniversary, editor-in-chief, Ernest M. Eller, managing editor, Thomas Burrowes, 1965.
- Sea power and the battle of New Orleans, by E.M. Eller, William J. Morgan, and R. M. Basoco. [New Orleans, La.] : Battle of New Orleans, 150th Anniversary Committee of Louisiana, 1965
- The Soviet sea challenge. Foreword by Arleigh Burke. [Chicago] Cowles Book Co. [1971]
- Naval weapons of the American Revolution, 1775–1783, prepared by Ernest M. Eller. Washington: American Defense Preparedness Association, 1976.
- Chesapeake Bay in the American Revolution, Ernest McNeill Eller, editor. Centreville, Md.: Tidewater Publishers, 1981.
- Reminiscences of Admiral Ernest M. Eller, United States Navy (Retired), interviewed by John T. Mason Jr. Annapolis, Maryland: U.S. Naval Institute, 1986

Major Contributions to the U.S. Naval Institute Proceedings (USNIP)

- 1930, “Will to Win.” USNIP 56, no. 5 (May): 371–378. [First Honorable Mention.].
- 1932, “Time is Life.” USNIP 58, no. 4 (April): 493–505. [Prize.].
- 1936, “Sea Power in the American Revolution.” USNIP 62, no. 6 (June): 777-789. [Honorable Mention.].
- 1936, “Courage is Not Enough.” USNIP 62, no. 7 (July): 943–955. [Honorable Mention.].
- 1938, “Japan’s Rising Sun.” USNIP 64, no. 7 (July): 949–962. [Special Award.].
- 1938, “The Philippines and the Pacific.” USNIP 64, no. 10 (October): 1467–1488. [Special Award. Plates, pp. 1481–1488.].
- 1942, “How Shall We Win?” USNIP 68, no. 4 (April): 465–476. [Prize.].
- 1946, “Against All Enemies.” USNIP 72, no. 7 (July): 891–907.
- 1950, “Will We Need a Navy to Win?” USNIP 76, no. 3 (March): 237–247. [Prize.].
- 1955, “Soviet Bid for the Sea.” USNIP 81, no. 6 (June): 619–635.
- 1956, “U.S. Destiny in the Middle East.” USNIP 82, no. 11 (November): 1160–1169.

== See also ==
- Naval Historical Center
- Ernest McNeill Eller Papers at East Carolina University
