= Eastland County, Texas =

County in Texas, United States

- County
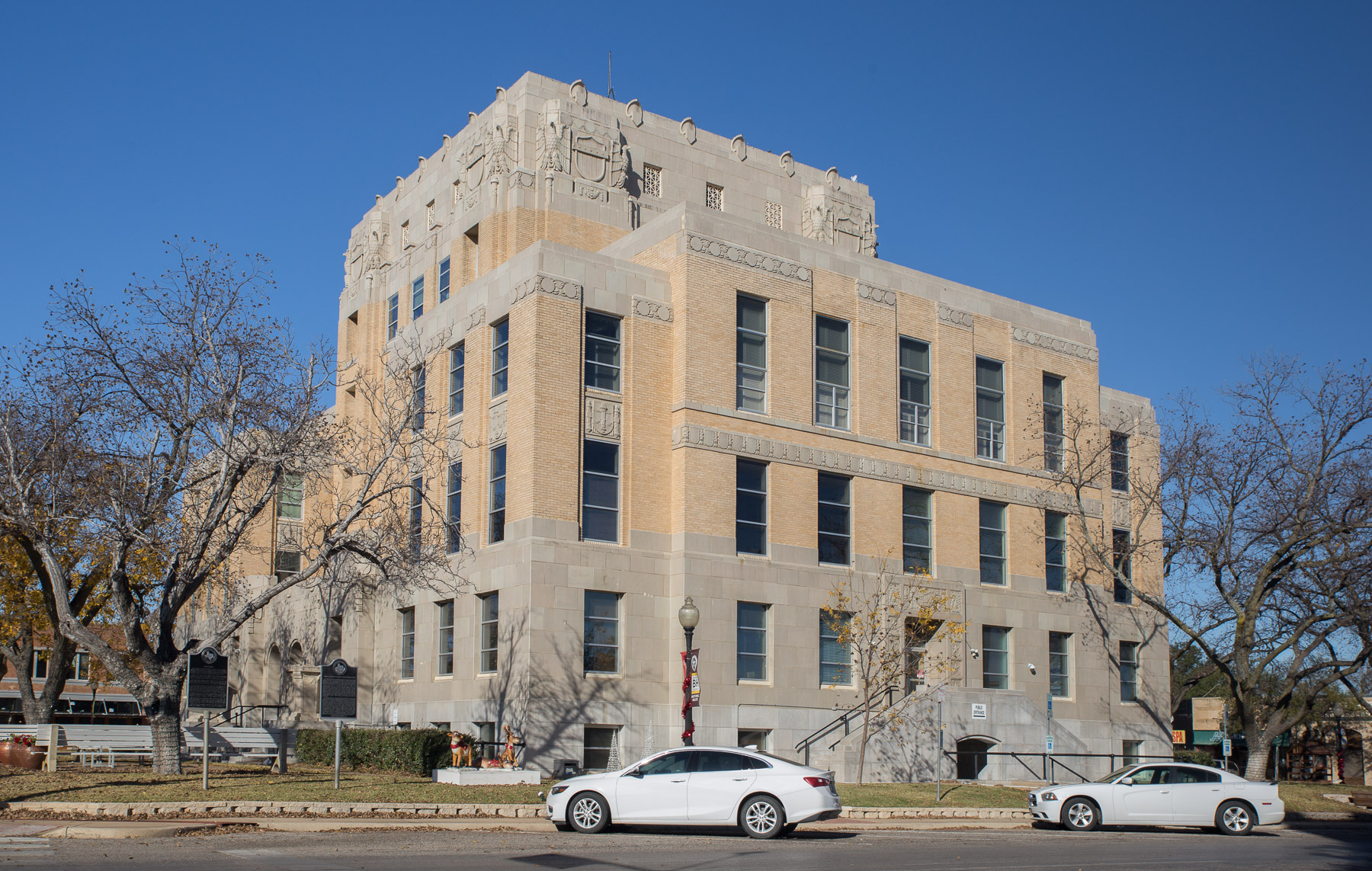
- Eastland County Courthouse

- Location within the U.S. state of Texas
- Coordinates: 32°20′N 98°50′W
- Country: United States
- State: Texas
- Founded: 1873
- Seat: Eastland
- Largest city: Eastland

Area
  - Total: 932 sq mi (2,410 km^{2})
  - Land: 926 sq mi (2,400 km^{2})
  - Water: 5.4 sq mi (14 km^{2}) 0.6%

Population (2020)
  - Total: 17,725
  - Estimate (2025): 18,143 ▲
  - Density: 19.1/sq mi (7.39/km^{2})
- Time zone: UTC−6 (Central)
  - Summer (DST): UTC−5 (CDT)
- Congressional district: 25th
- Website: www.eastlandcountytexas.com

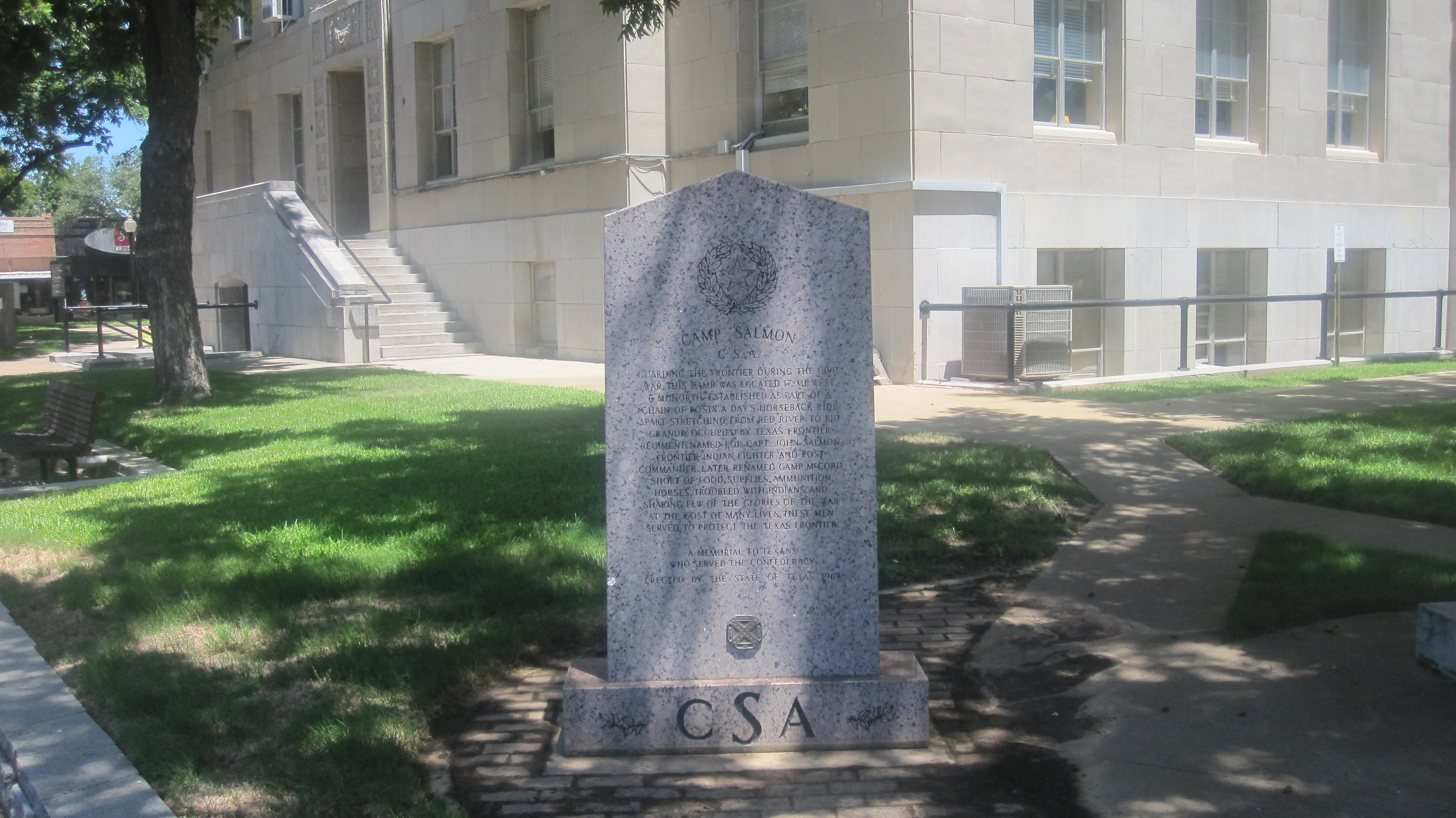
The Confederate States of America monument on the courthouse lawn in Eastland

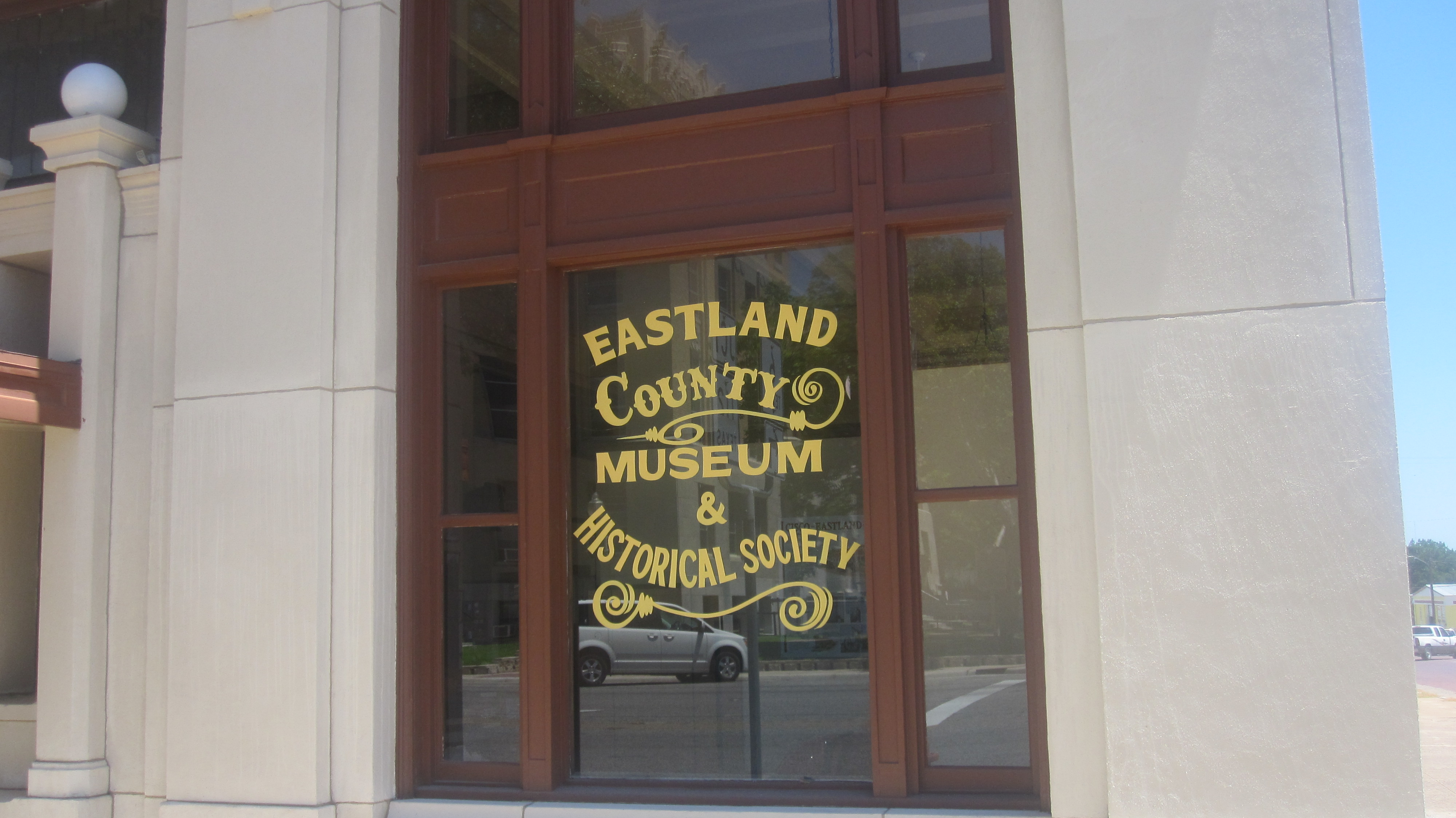
Across from the courthouse is the Eastland County Museum and Historical Society building.

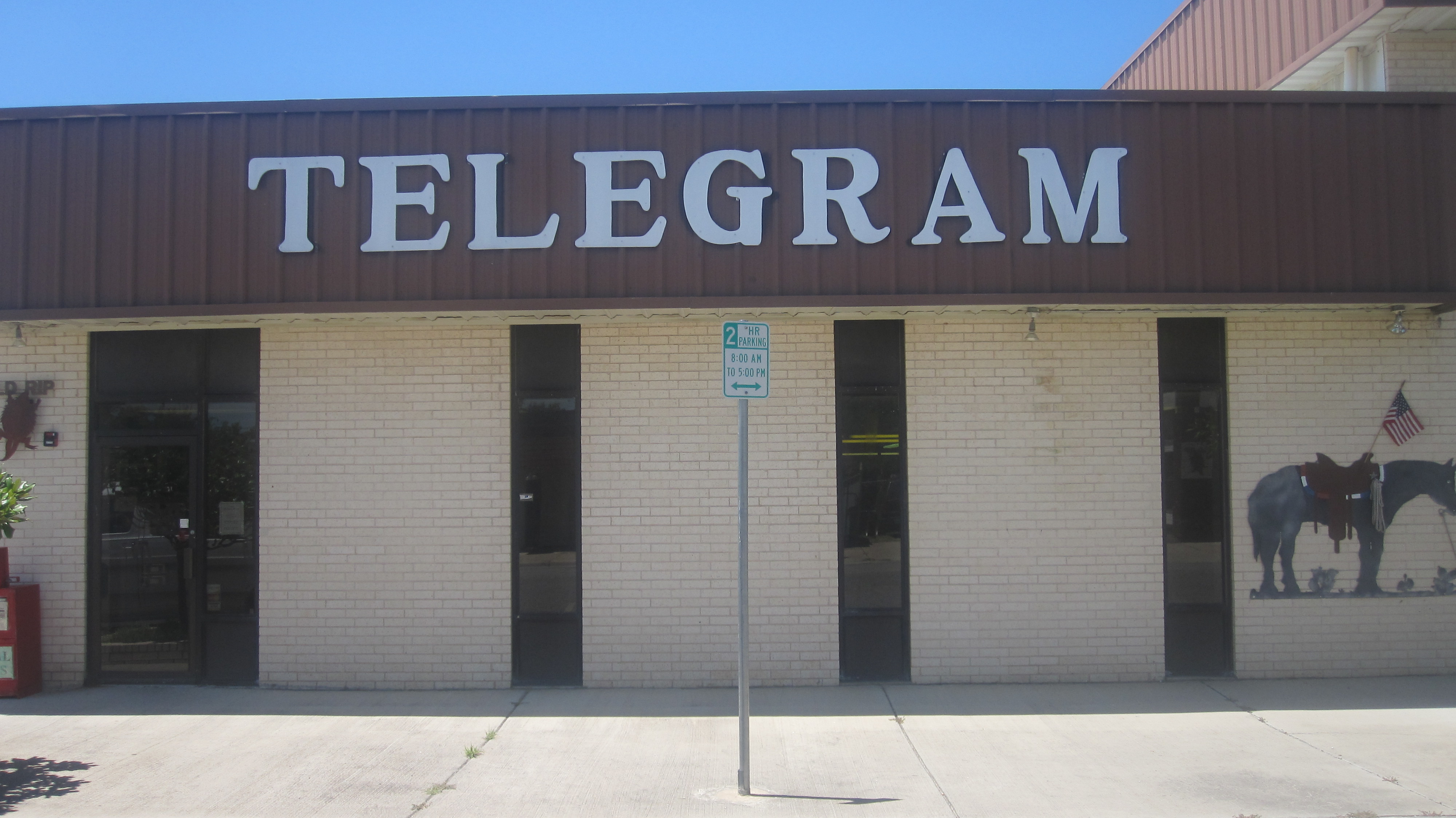
The Eastland Telegram newspaper serves Eastland County.

Eastland County is a county located in central West Texas. As of the 2020 census, its population was 17,725. The county seat is Eastland. The county was founded in 1858 and later organized in 1873. It is named for William Mosby Eastland, a soldier during the Texas Revolution and the only officer to die as a result of the "Black Bean executions" of the Mier Expedition.

Two Eastland County communities, Cisco and Ranger, have junior colleges.

== Geography ==
According to the U.S. Census Bureau, the county has a total area of 932 sq mi (2,410 km^{2}), of which 5.4 sq mi (14 km^{2}) (0.6%) are covered by water.

=== Major highways ===
- Interstate 20
- U.S. Highway 183
- State Highway 6
- State Highway 16
- State Highway 36
- State Highway 112
- Loop 254
- Loop 389
- Spur 490

=== Adjacent counties ===
- Stephens County (north)
- Palo Pinto County (northeast)
- Erath County (east)
- Comanche County (southeast)
- Brown County (south)
- Callahan County (west)
- Shackelford County (northwest)

== Demographics ==
Historical population
Census	Pop.	Note	%±
1860	99		—
1870	88		−11.1%
1880	4,855		5,417.0%
1890	10,373		113.7%
1900	17,971		73.2%
1910	23,421		30.3%
1920	58,505		149.8%
1930	34,156		−41.6%
1940	30,345		−11.2%
1950	23,942		−21.1%
1960	19,526		−18.4%
1970	18,092		−7.3%
1980	19,480		7.7%
1990	18,488		−5.1%
2000	18,297		−1.0%
2010	18,583		1.6%
2020	17,725		−4.6%
2025 (est.)	18,143	▲	2.4%
U.S. Decennial Census; 1850–2010 2010 2020

=== 2020 census ===
As of the 2020 census, the county had a population of 17,725. The median age was 43.4 years; 21.1% of the residents were under 18 and 22.7% were 65 or older. For every 100 females, there were 96.5 males, and for every 100 females 18 and over, there were 95.5 males 18 and over.

The racial makeup of the county was 82.8% White, 2.0% Black or African American, 0.8% American Indian and Alaska Native, 0.6% Asian, 0.1% Native Hawaiian and Pacific Islander, 5.4% from some other race, and 8.2% from two or more races. Hispanic or Latino residents of any race comprised 16.6% of the population.

None of the residents lived in urban areas, while 100.0% lived in rural areas.

Of the 7,167 households in the county, 27.2% had children under 18 living in them, 49.2% were married-couple households, 18.7% were households with a male householder and no spouse or partner present, and 27.3% were households with a female householder and no spouse or partner present. About 30.5% of all households were made up of individuals, and 16.4% had someone living alone who was 65 or older.

The county had 9,341 housing units, of which 23.3% were vacant. Among occupied housing units, 72.9% were owner-occupied and 27.1% were renter-occupied. The homeowner vacancy rate was 3.0% and the rental vacancy rate was 11.9%.

=== Racial and ethnic composition ===
Eastland County, Texas – Racial and ethnic composition Note: the US Census treats Hispanic/Latino as an ethnic category. This table excludes Latinos from the racial categories and assigns them to a separate category. Hispanics/Latinos may be of any race.
Race / Ethnicity (NH = Non-Hispanic)	Pop 1980	Pop 1990	Pop 2000	Pop 2010	Pop 2020	% 1980	% 1990	% 2000	% 2010	% 2020
White alone (NH)	18,105	16,605	15,686	15,271	13,653	92.94%	89.82%	85.73%	82.18%	77.03%
Black or African American alone (NH)	365	395	397	318	335	1.87%	2.14%	2.17%	1.71%	1.89%
Native American or Alaska Native alone (NH)	46	43	61	92	96	0.24%	0.23%	0.33%	0.50%	0.54%
Asian alone (NH)	33	33	36	62	95	0.17%	0.18%	0.20%	0.33%	0.54%
Native Hawaiian or Pacific Islander alone (NH)	x	x	2	8	16	x	x	0.01%	0.04%	0.09%
Other race alone (NH)	2	8	15	8	26	0.01%	0.04%	0.08%	0.04%	0.15%
Multiracial (NH)	x	x	124	151	570	x	x	0.68%	0.81%	3.22%
Hispanic or Latino (any race)	929	1,404	1,976	2,673	2,934	4.77%	7.59%	10.80%	14.38%	16.55%
Total	19,480	18,488	18,297	18,583	17,725	100.00%	100.00%	100.00%	100.00%	100.00%

=== 2000 census ===
As of the 2000 census, 18,297 people, 7,321 households, and 5,036 families resided in the county. The population density was 20 inhabitants per square mile (7.7/km^{2}). The 9,547 housing units averaged 10 per square mile (3.9/km^{2}). The racial makeup of the county was 91.03% White, 2.18% African American, 0.48% Native American, 0.21% Asian, 4.85% from other races, and 1.25% from two or more races. About 10.80% of the population was Hispanic or Latino of any race.

Of the 7,321 households, 27.7% had children under 18 living with them, 55.4% were married couples living together, 9.5% had a female householder with no husband present, and 31.2% were not families. About 28.6% of all households were made up of individuals, and 16.2% had someone living alone who was 65 or older. The average household size was 2.39 and the average family size was 2.93.

In the county, the population was distributed as 23.2% under 18, 9.8% from 18 to 24, 22.3% from 25 to 44, 23.9% from 45 to 64, and 20.9% who were 65 or older. The median age was 41 years. For every 100 females, there were 94.1 males. For every 100 females 18 and over, there were 90.6 males.

The median income in the county for a household was $26,832 and for a family was $33,562. Males had a median income of $25,598 versus $17,112 for females. The per capita income for the county was $14,870. About 12.10% of families and 16.80% of the population were below the poverty line, including 23.10% of those under 18 and 14.80% of those 65 or over.

== Eastland Complex fires of 2022 ==
Eastland Complex fires of 2022
- Part of the 2022 Texas wildfires
- Date: March 17, 2022
- Location: Central Texas

Statistics
- Total fires: 382
- Total area: 54,463 acres (22,040 ha)

Impacts
- Deaths: 1
- Injuries: 1
- Structures destroyed: 50
- Cost: Unknown

On March 17, 2022, a fire complex formed about 3 km (1.9 mi) southeast of Romney. It was claimed to have been started by drought conditions. The biggest fire so far was the Kidd fire, burning about 42,333 acres.

Smoke from the fires reached as far as Houston.

== Education ==
School districts include:

- Cisco Independent School District
- Cross Plains Independent School District
- De Leon Independent School District
- Eastland Independent School District
- Gorman Independent School District
- Huckabay Independent School District
- Lingleville Independent School District
- Ranger Independent School District
- Rising Star Independent School District

Despite its small population, the county is home to two community colleges – Cisco College and Ranger College, located in their respective towns.

The service area of Cisco College in the county is Cisco ISD, as per the Texas Education Code (TEC). The service area of Ranger College in the county is the portion of Ranger ISD in that county, except for the "old Bullock School Land", as per the TEC. As of 2024, the TEC does not specify community college service areas for the remainder of the county.

== Media ==
Eastland County is part of the Abilene/Sweetwater/Brownwood television viewing area in west-central Texas. Local news media outlets include KRBC-TV, KTXS-TV, KXVA, and KTAB-TV. In the cities of Eastland, Ranger, and Cisco on Suddenlink Communications Cable Television service, residents can view the Dallas/Fort Worth market stations WFAA-TV and KERA-TV.

Eastland County is also served by four local newspapers: the Eastland Telegram, the Rising Star, Ranger Times, and Cisco Press.

== Communities ==
=== Cities ===
- Cisco
- Eastland (county seat)
- Gorman
- Ranger

=== Towns ===
- Carbon
- Rising Star

=== Unincorporated communities ===
- Kokomo
- Morton Valley
- Nimrod
- Olden
- Romney

=== Ghost towns ===
- Mangum

== Politics ==
United States presidential election results for Eastland County, Texas
Year	Republican		Democratic		Third party(ies)	
Year	No.	%	No.	%	No.	%
1912	66	3.99%	1,498	90.51%	91	5.50%
1916	146	7.53%	1,486	76.64%	307	15.83%
1920	941	23.13%	2,942	72.30%	186	4.57%
1924	972	17.11%	4,548	80.04%	162	2.85%
1928	3,233	56.38%	2,501	43.62%	0	0.00%
1932	598	10.76%	4,958	89.24%	0	0.00%
1936	724	13.36%	4,659	85.99%	35	0.65%
1940	1,063	15.43%	5,818	84.48%	6	0.09%
1944	643	10.59%	4,607	75.87%	822	13.54%
1948	1,177	17.66%	5,121	76.83%	367	5.51%
1952	4,518	57.15%	3,370	42.63%	18	0.23%
1956	3,580	58.61%	2,512	41.13%	16	0.26%
1960	3,359	52.09%	3,058	47.42%	32	0.50%
1964	2,049	30.35%	4,692	69.49%	11	0.16%
1968	2,453	38.63%	2,884	45.42%	1,013	15.95%
1972	4,106	71.50%	1,630	28.38%	7	0.12%
1976	2,340	34.95%	4,320	64.53%	35	0.52%
1980	3,442	50.05%	3,346	48.65%	89	1.29%
1984	4,841	65.52%	2,522	34.13%	26	0.35%
1988	3,929	54.83%	3,215	44.86%	22	0.31%
1992	2,830	38.87%	2,738	37.60%	1,713	23.53%
1996	3,272	49.61%	2,594	39.33%	730	11.07%
2000	4,531	70.64%	1,774	27.66%	109	1.70%
2004	5,249	76.55%	1,582	23.07%	26	0.38%
2008	5,165	79.35%	1,271	19.53%	73	1.12%
2012	5,444	83.82%	970	14.93%	81	1.25%
2016	6,011	86.33%	776	11.14%	176	2.53%
2020	7,237	87.27%	983	11.85%	73	0.88%
2024	7,397	88.44%	918	10.98%	49	0.59%

United States Senate election results for Eastland County, Texas1
Year	Republican		Democratic		Third party(ies)	
Year	No.	%	No.	%	No.	%
2024	7,132	86.21%	1,026	12.40%	115	1.39%

United States Senate election results for Eastland County, Texas2
Year	Republican		Democratic		Third party(ies)	
Year	No.	%	No.	%	No.	%
2020	7,015	86.72%	910	11.25%	164	2.03%

Texas Gubernatorial election results for Eastland County
Year	Republican		Democratic		Third party(ies)	
Year	No.	%	No.	%	No.	%
2022	5,468	88.91%	634	10.31%	48	0.78%

== See also ==
- National Register of Historic Places listings in Eastland County, Texas
- Recorded Texas Historic Landmarks in Eastland County
- Santa Claus Bank Robbery
