= De Leon Independent School District =

School district in Texas

Address
- 425 S Texas St De Leon, Comanche County, Texas, 76444; United States

District information
- Type: Independent school district
- Grades: PK-12
- Superintendent: Dana S. Marable, Ph.D.
- Schools: 3
- Budget: $7.75 million (2015-2016)
- NCES District ID: 4816440

Students and staff
- Students: 728 (2017-2018)
- Teachers: 61.6 (2017-2018)
- Staff: 120.8 (2017-2018)

Other information
- Website: www.deleonisd.net

De Leon Independent School District is a public school district based in De Leon, Texas (United States).

Located in Comanche County, small portions of the district extend into Erath and Eastland counties.

In 2009, the school district was rated "academically acceptable" by the Texas Education Agency.

== Schools ==
- De Leon High (Grades 9–12)
- Perkins Middle (Grades 6–8)
- De Leon Elementary (Grades PK-5)

== Notable alumni ==
- Tex Irvin - American football player
- Sid Miller (1974) - Republican member of the Texas House of Representatives from Erath County, 2001–2013
- Autry Stephens (1956) - founder of Endeavor Energy Resources
