= De Leon High School (Texas) =

Public school in the United States

Location
- 200 West Manchaca Avenue; De Leon, Texas 77444; United States; 32.1155°N 98.5366°W

Information
- School type: Public high school
- School district: De Leon Independent School District
- Principal: Chuck Miller
- Staff: 23.57 (FTE)
- Grades: 9-12
- Enrollment: 203 (2023–2024)
- Student to teacher ratio: 8.61
- Colors: Maroon & White
- Athletics conference: UIL Class 2A
- Mascot: Bearcats/Lady Cats
- Yearbook: De Leonian
- Website: www.deleonisd.net/o/dlhs

De Leon High School is a public high school located in the city of De Leon, Texas (USA) and classified as a 2A school by the UIL. It is a part of the De Leon Independent School District of Comanche County, Texas. In 2015, the school was rated "Met Standard" by the Texas Education Agency. In 2024, De Leon High School was awarded a blue ribbon by the U.S Department of Education.

== Athletics ==
The De Leon Bearcats compete in the following sports:

- Baseball
- Basketball
- Cross Country
- Football
- Golf
- Softball
- Track & Field
- Volleyball
- Powerlifting

=== State titles ===
- Football -
  - 1975(1A)

==== State Finalist ====
- Football -
  - 1976(1A), 1990(1A)

== Notable alumni ==
- Tex Irvin - American football player
- Sid Miller (1974) - Republican member of the Texas House of Representatives from Erath County, 2001–2013
- Autry Stephens (1956) - founder of Endeavor Energy Resources
