= Nathan Sheets =

Nathan Sheets may refer to:

- D. Nathan Sheets (born 1964), former Under Secretary of the Treasury for International Affairs (2014–2017)
- Nathan Sheets, politician and 2026 Republican nominee for Texas Commissioner of Agriculture
