= Shelby Slawson =

American lawyer and politician

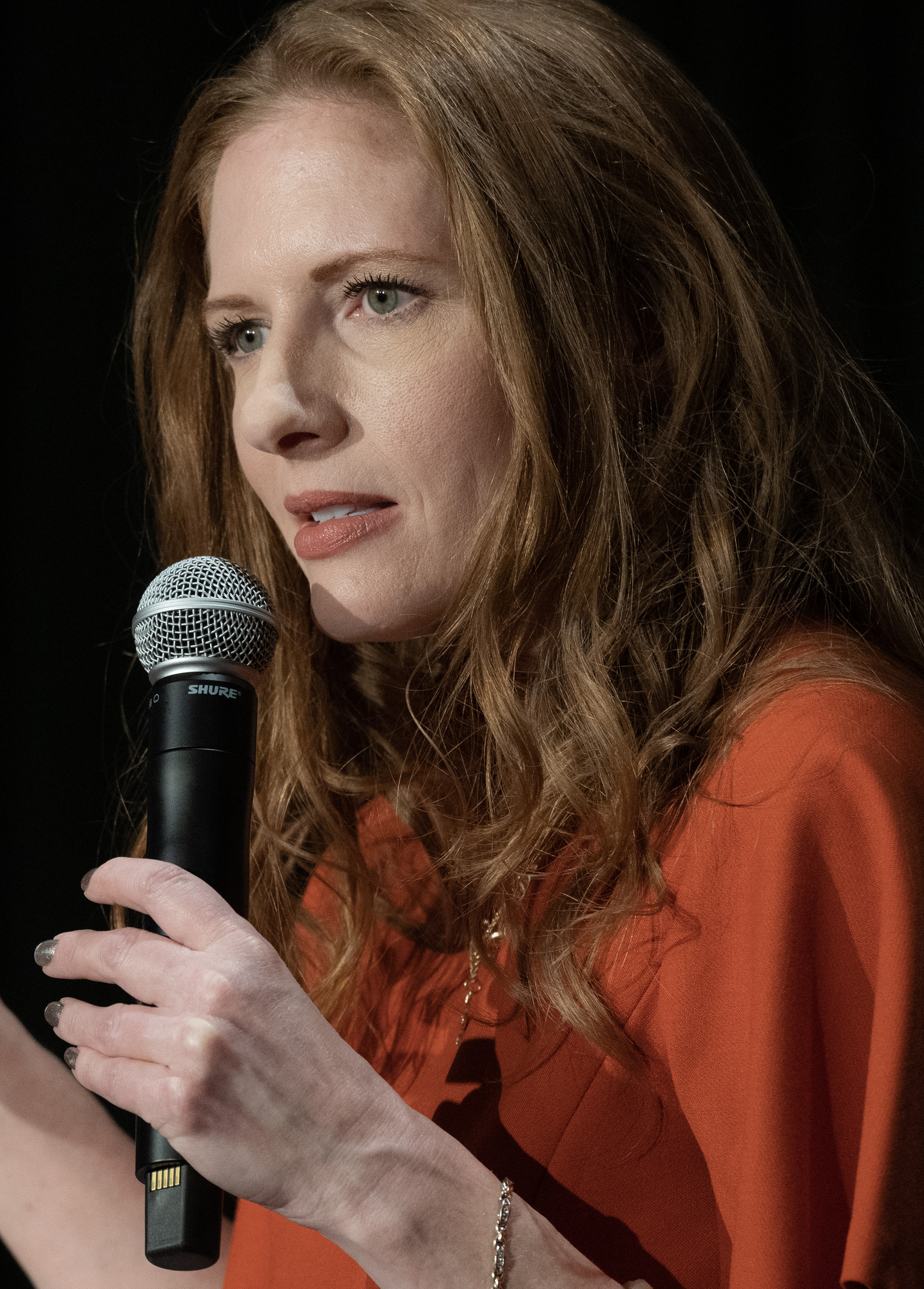

Member of the Texas House of Representatives from the 59th district
- Incumbent
- Assumed office January 12, 2021
- Preceded by: J. D. Sheffield

Personal details
- Born: May 3, 1977 (age 49) Texas, U.S.
- Party: Republican
- Education: University of Texas at Dallas (BA); University of Texas at Austin (JD)
- Occupation: Attorney; businesswoman
- Website: Campaign website

Shelby Slawson (born May 3, 1977) is an American attorney, businesswoman, and politician. She has represented the 59th District in the Texas House of Representatives since 2021, and is a member of the Republican Party.

== Early life ==
She was born and raised in Texas. She graduated from Stephenville High School. She attended University of Texas at Dallas earning an undergraduate degree, summa cum laude, in government and politics in 2000. She earned her Juris Doctor from the University of Texas School of Law in 2003.

== Career ==
=== Business ===
Slawson is a small business owner and attorney.

Slawson served as an appointed board member for the Stephenville Economic Development Authority (SEDA).

=== Politics ===
In 2018, Slawson ran for Erath County judge, losing to Alfonso Campos in a runoff election in the Republican primary.

Shelby filed in June 2019 to run for the Texas House of Representatives District 59 seat, running against 8-year incumbent J. D. Sheffield. She defeated Sheffield in the 2020 Republican primary runoff with 62% of the vote in July 2020. Slawson ran unopposed in the November 2020 election. Slawson had endorsements from Sid Miller and Pat Fallon.

On March 11, 2021, state senator Bryan Hughes of Mineola, Texas introduced a six-week abortion ban entitled the Texas Heartbeat Act (SB8) into the state senate, while Slawson introduced a companion bill (HB1515) into the Texas House. The bill allowed private citizens to sue those who performed abortions after detection of a fetal heartbeat. The SB8 version of the bill passed both chambers and was signed into law by Texas Governor Greg Abbott on May 19, 2021. It took effect on September 1, 2021.

Texas House of Representatives
Preceded by J. D. Sheffield	Member of the Texas House of Representatives from the 59th district 2021–present	Incumbent
