= Tex Irvin =

American football player (1906–1978)

No. 29
- Position: Tackle

Personal information
- Born: October 9, 1906; De Leon, Texas, U.S.
- Died: February 11, 1978 (aged 71); De Leon, Texas, U.S.
- Listed height: 6 ft 0 in (1.83 m)
- Listed weight: 225 lb (102 kg)

Career information
- High school: Cisco (TX)
- College: Davis & Elkins

Career history
- Providence Steam Roller (1931); New York Giants (1932–1935)

Awards and highlights
- NFL champion (1934)
- Stats at Pro Football Reference

Cecil Paul "Tex" Irvin (October 9, 1906 – February 11, 1978), also nicknamed "Honk", was an American professional football player who was a tackle for five seasons in the National Football League (NFL) with the Providence Steam Roller and New York Giants. He first enrolled at the Schreiner Institute before transferring to Davis & Elkins College.

== Early life ==
Irvin first played high school football for the De Leon High School Bearcats for one year. He then played for the Stamford High School Bulldogs for one year. He played his final two years of high school football for the Cisco High School Lobos.

== College career ==
Irvin first played college football in 1926 at the Schreiner Institute.

Irvin then transferred to play four years as a tackle and fullback for the Davis & Elkins Senators of Davis & Elkins College. He earned All-American honors in 1929. He graduated from Davis & Elkins College in 1931.

== Professional career ==
Irvin played in ten games, starting nine, for the Providence Steam Roller during the 1931 season. He played in 46 games, starting 20, for the New York Giants from 1932 to 1935.

== Personal life ==
Irvin returned to De Leon, Texas to work for the Humble Pipeline Company after retiring from football. He spent time in the United States Navy during World War II and served as a coach for several football programs for the military. His first stint came as a line coach at Southwestern University in Georgetown, Texas, where the Navy had set a training program. Many players from Texas colleges who had entered the military were stationed at Georgetown and assigned to continue their college work at Southwestern. Irvin was later transferred to the Pacific and coached in the Central Pacific Area Football League. He returned to work in De Leon for Humble after the war. He was transferred several times while working for Humble but returned to De Leon after his retirement.

Irvin was inducted into the Texas High School Football Hall of Fame in 1969.
