= Autry Stephens =

American businessman, investor and philanthropist (1938–2024)

- Born: Autry Carl Stephens; March 8, 1938; De Leon, Texas, U.S.
- Died: August 16, 2024 (aged 86); Midland, Texas, U.S.
- Education: University of Texas at Austin (BS, MS)
- Occupations: Businessman, investor, philanthropist
- Years active: 1979–2024
- Known for: Founding and leading Endeavor Energy Resources
- Spouse: Linda Stephens
- Children: 2

Autry Carl Stephens (March 8, 1938 – August 16, 2024) was an American billionaire businessman, investor, and philanthropist best known for founding Endeavor Energy Resources.

== Biography ==
=== Early life and education ===
Stephens was born March 8, 1938, in De Leon, Texas, the fourth of five children to Martin Elmore Stephens, a watermelon and peanut farmer, and Hazel Lila Stephens (née Johnson; 1905–2011). His father owned a dealership that sold Massey Ferguson tractor equipment. He graduated from De Leon High School in 1956; while in high school, he worked on a peanut farm. After a major drought that year, with the advice of his father, he decided to pursue a career other than farming; his love of the outdoors and exotic locations led him to major in petroleum engineering. He enrolled in Tarleton State College but transferred to the University of Texas at Austin in 1958.

He received a Bachelor of Science in 1961 and a Master of Science in 1962, both in Petroleum engineering from the University of Texas at Austin.

=== Career ===
In 1962, he began his career as a petroleum engineer for Humble Oil. That year, he took a leave of absence to fulfill his duties to the Reserve Officers' Training Corps outside of Paris. He returned to Humble Oil in 1964 in Monahans, Texas.

In 1969, he took a job with First National Bank of Midland as a petroleum engineer and loan officer, where he worked for 10 years completing appraisals of properties for petroleum exploration.

In 1979, he founded a petroleum consulting firm to estimate reserves for financial disclosures but was fired by his major client after it disagreed with his valuations. That year, Stephens used his life savings to acquire 80 acres of land on which he drilled his first well, McClintic B-30 #2, in the Spraberry Trend.

In 1996, he founded Big Dog Drilling.

In 2000, he founded Endeavor Energy Resources as the successor to his sole proprietorship.

Stevens defaulted on debt in 1999 and lost a lot in both 2008 and 2014 when oil prices crashed.

After Stephens was diagnosed with prostate cancer, he sold the company to provide liquidity for his family.

After an auction process, in September 2024, one month after Stevens died, Diamondback Energy acquired the company for $26 billion, including $8 billion in cash and the remainder in stock.

== Personal life and death ==
Stephens was married to Linda (née Nagy), with whom he had two children.

Stephens died from prostate cancer in Midland, Texas, on August 16, 2024, at the age of 86.
