= Clayton Tucker =

American politician

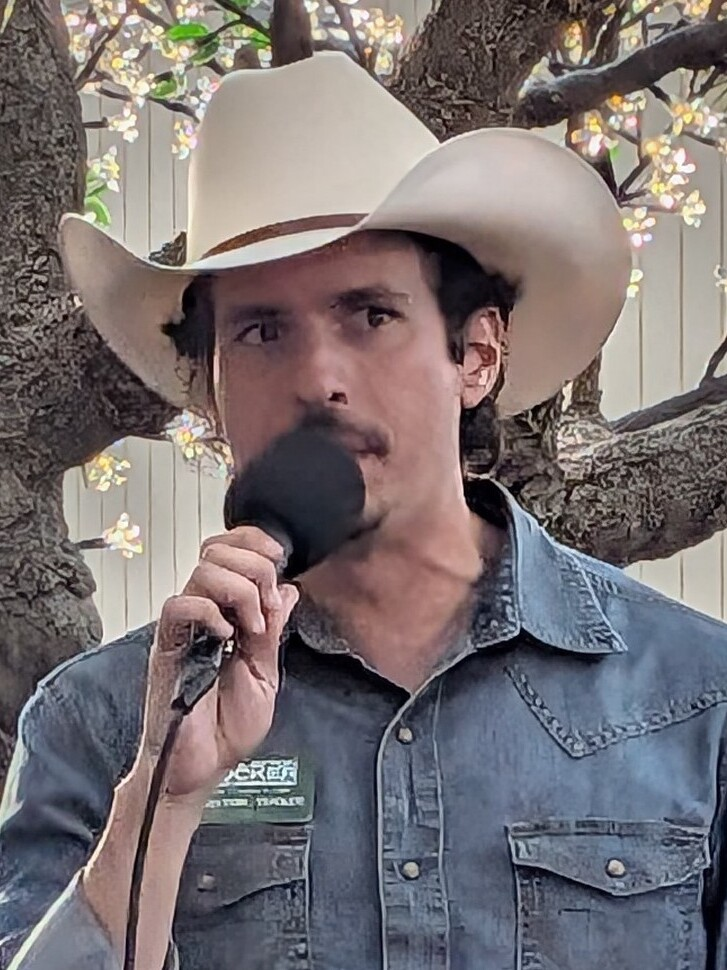
- Tucker in 2026

Agriculture Commissioner-elect of Texas
- Assuming office January 1, 2027
- Governor: Greg Abbott; Gina Hinojosa (elect)
- Succeeding: Sid Miller

Personal details
- Born: Clayton Tucker; 1990 or 1991 (age 35–36)
- Party: Democratic
- Education: Southwestern University (BA); National Chengchi University
- Website: Campaign website

Clayton Howard Tucker is an American politician and rancher who is the agriculture commissioner-elect of Texas. A member of the Democratic Party, he was elected in 2026, becoming the first Democrat elected agriculture commissioner since Jim Hightower in 1990.

== Early life and education ==
He attended Southwestern University, graduating in 2013 with a bachelor's degree in international politics and trade. While at Southwestern, he joined the Kappa Sigma fraternity. He also completed coursework at National Chengchi University in Taipei.

== Career ==
Before entering statewide politics, Tucker worked on his family's ranch in Lampasas, Texas. He is also the secretary of the Texas Farmers Union. He has also worked as an educator and as a political organizer for the Trade Justice Education Fund.

Tucker ran for a seat in the Texas Senate in 2020 and lost to incumbent senator Dawn Buckingham. He later ran in the 2026 Texas Commissioner of Agriculture election as a Democrat. Tucker won the election against Republican Nate Sheets. Following his victory, he proposed a statewide moratorium on data center construction.

== Political policies ==
Tucker has been described as a prairie populist and a progressive. He is a founding member and former chair of the Texas Democratic Party Progressive Caucus.

=== Agriculture and food ===
In 2026, Tucker campaigned on ensuring that public school lunches are made in Texas without harmful dyes or chemicals, making industrial hemp available to Texas farmers, establishing agricultural cooperatives, and busting agricultural monopolies such as Tyson Foods and John Deere.

=== Technology ===
In 2026, Tucker called for regulations to reduce the impact of data centers on land, water and energy, and agricultural production in Texas. Tucker is Catholic and opposes AI data centers on religious grounds, and has compared them to the apple in the Garden of Eden. Following his 2026 election, he proposed a statewide moratorium on data center construction and stated that he would crack down on surveillance pricing.

== Electoral history ==
=== 2020 ===
2020 Texas Senate 24th district Democratic primary election
Party	Candidate	Votes	%
Democratic	Clayton Tucker	39,280	100.0%
Total votes		39,280	100.0%

Texas's 24th State Senate District general election, 2020
Party	Candidate	Votes	%
Republican	Dawn Buckingham (incumbent)	264,517	69.54%
Democratic	Clayton Tucker	115,853	30.46%
Total votes		380,370	100.00%
Republican hold			

=== 2026 ===
2026 Texas Commissioner of Agriculture Democratic primary election
Party	Candidate	Votes	%
Democratic	Clayton Tucker	1,928,300	100.0
Total votes		1,928,300	100.0

2026 Texas Commissioner of Agriculture general election
Party	Candidate	Votes	%
Democratic	Clayton Tucker	4,993,724	51.3
Republican	Nate Sheets	4,540,149	46.6
Libertarian	Austin Kelly	199,124	2.0
Total votes			100.0%
