= Texas's 59th House of Representatives district =

American legislative district

Texas's 59th State House of Representatives district
Representative
| Shelby Slawson; R–Stephenville |
- Demographics: 68.0% White; 9.2% Black; 17.8% Hispanic; 2.4% Asian
- Population (2020) • Voting age: 195,458; 152,143

The 59th district of the Texas House of Representatives contains the entirety of Coryell, Erath, Hamilton, and Hood counties. The current representative is Shelby Slawson, who was first elected in 2020.

== Members ==
- Juan Hinojosa (1981–1983)
- David Lengefeld (until 2001)
- Sid Miller (2001–2013)
- J. D. Sheffield (2013–2021)
- Shelby Slawson (since 2021)
