= J. D. Sheffield =

Medical director, physician, and Texas state legislator

Member of the Texas House of Representatives from the 59th district
- In office January 8, 2013 – 2021
- Preceded by: Sid Miller
- Succeeded by: Shelby Slawson

Personal details
- Born: August 13, 1960 (age 66) Loraine, Texas, U.S.
- Party: Republican
- Spouse: Janice Gray Sheffield
- Education: Western Texas College; Howard Payne University; Texas College of Osteopathic Medicine
- Occupation: Physician

Jesse David Sheffield II, known as J. D. Sheffield (born August 13, 1960), is a physician from Gatesville, Texas, who was a Republican member of the Texas House of Representatives.

On July 14, 2020, Sheffield was defeated in his re-election effort by Stephenville, Texas attorney Shelby Slawson by over 20% in the Republican primary runoff.

== Background ==
Sheffield currently practices at AdventHealth in Copperas Cove.

== Political career ==
Sheffield represented Texas House District 59 that encompassed Comanche, Coryell, Erath, Hamilton, McCulloch (after 2013), Mills, San Saba (after 2013), and Somervell counties in Central Texas. Sheffield was one of former House Speaker Joe Straus's loyal supporters.

=== 2010 Republican primary for 59th district ===
The 2010 election was Sheffield's first campaign for local or state office. He had served in student government during college. In the Republican primary in 2010, Sheffield polled 44.2 percent in his challenge to incumbent Sid Miller who had held the office since 2001.

=== 2012 election for 59th district ===
Two years after his unsuccessful challenge to Miller, Sheffield gained the Republican nomination with 54.8 percent of the ballots cast. Sheffield easily won in the November general election with 78% of the vote district wide against Bill Norris, the Democratic nominee and a retired school teacher from Dublin. Norris had effectively dropped out of the race for health reasons but remained on the ballot.

=== 2014 election ===
Sheffield won his reelection bid in 2014.

=== 2016 election ===
Brent Graves, an auctioneer from Stephenville, ran against Sheffield for the Republican nomination in 2016. Graves lost to Sheffield 61% to 38%, district wide. Sheffield ran unopposed in the general election

=== 2018 election ===
In 2018, Sheffield defeated Chris Evans in the Republican primary. Sheffield ran unopposed in the general election.

=== 2020 election ===
On July 14, 2020, Sheffield was defeated in his re-election effort by Stephenville, Texas attorney Shelby Slawson by over 20% in the Republican primary runoff. Slawson did not have an opponent in the 2020 general election.

=== Committees ===
During his time in the Legislature, Sheffield served on the Texas House committees of Appropriations, Corrections, Public Health, Rules and Resolutions.

== Personal life ==
He is married to Janice Gray Sheffield, a former District Clerk of Coryell County. Sheffield attends First Baptist Church, a congregation in Gatesville.

Texas House of Representatives
Preceded by Sid Miller	Texas State Representative from District 59 (Comanche, Coryell, Erath, Hamilton, McCulloch, Mills, San Saba, and Somervell counties); 2013–2021	Succeeded by Shelby Slawson
