= 2026 Texas Commissioner of Agriculture election =

2026 Texas Agriculture Commissioner election
- November 3, 2026
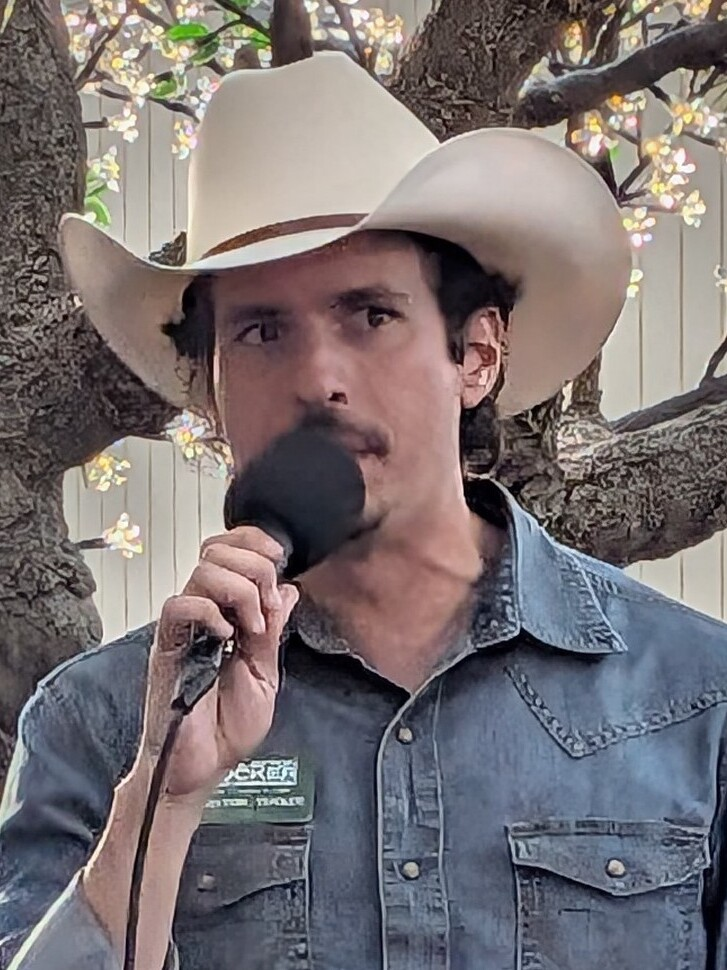

Candidate	Clayton Tucker	Nate Sheets
Party	Democratic	Republican
Popular vote	4,993,724	4,540,149
Percentage	51.3%	46.7%
- County results Tucker: 40–50% 50–60% 60–70% 70–80% Sheets: 40–50% 50–60% 60–70% 70–80% 80–90% ≥90%
agriculture commissioner before election
Sid Miller
Republican
Elected agriculture commissioner
Clayton Tucker
Democratic

The 2026 Texas Commissioner of Agriculture election was held on November 3, 2026, to elect the agriculture commissioner of Texas. Primary elections took place on March 3, 2026. Incumbent commissioner Sid Miller ran for re-election to a fourth term in office, but was defeated in the Republican primary by Nate Sheets. Sheets then faced Democratic nominee Clayton Tucker in the general election.

On November 4, 2026, the Associated Press called the election for Tucker, marking the first Democratic victory for this office since Jim Hightower's re-election in 1986.

== Republican primary ==
Incumbent commissioner Sid Miller has frequently been the subject of critiques and scandal during his tenure. Miller faced vocal opposition from other statewide officials and members of the legislature who accused his office of corruption and ineptitude, including Governor Greg Abbott who endorsed his primary opponent, Nate Sheets. President Donald Trump, who had been a longtime supporter of Miller, renewed his endorsement the week before the election, but on election day Sheets won the primary with about 53% of the vote.

=== Candidates ===
==== Nominee ====
- Nate Sheets, beekeeper and small business owner

==== Eliminated in primary ====
- Sid Miller, incumbent agriculture commissioner

=== Endorsements ===
Sid Miller

Executive branch officials

- Donald Trump, president of the United States (2017–2021, 2025–present)

U.S. representatives

- Michael McCaul, TX-10 (2005–present)
- Troy Nehls, TX-22 (2021–present)
- Beth Van Duyne, TX-24 (2021–present)

Statewide officials

- Wayne Christian, railroad commissioner of Texas (2017–present)

State legislators

- Gary Gates, state representative from the 28th district (2020–present)
- Don McLaughlin, state representative from the 80th district (2025–present)

Individuals

- Ted Nugent, guitarist
Nate Sheets

Executive branch officials

- Susan Combs, former assistant secretary of the interior (2019–2020)
- Ronny Jackson, TX-13 (2021–present) and former physician to the President (2013–2018)

U.S. senators

- Rick Santorum, Pennsylvania (1995–2007)

Statewide officials

- Greg Abbott, governor of Texas (2015–present)
- Dawn Buckingham, land commissioner of Texas (2023–present)

State legislators

- Angela Paxton, former majority leader of the Texas Senate (2023–2025) from the 8th district (2019–present)
- Charles Perry, president pro tempore of the Texas Senate (2025–present) from the 28th district (2014–present)
- Kevin Sparks, state senator from the 31st district (2023–present)

Individuals

- Jim McIngvale, businessman
- Mark Meckler, conservative activist

Organizations

- Gun Owners of America
- Texas and Southwestern Cattle Raisers Association
- Texas Eagle Forum
- Texas Farm Bureau
- Texas Gun Rights
- Veterans for America First

Newspapers

- Austin American-Statesman
- Fort Worth Star-Telegram
- Houston Chronicle
- San Antonio Express-News

=== Debates ===
2026 Texas Agriculture Commissioner Republican primary debates
No.	Date	Host	Moderator	Link	Participants	
P Participant A Absent N Non-invitee I Invitee W Withdrawn						
P Participant A Absent N Non-invitee I Invitee W Withdrawn					Miller	Sheets
1	February 15, 2026	American Jewish Conservatives			P	P

=== Polling ===
Poll source	Date(s) administered	Sample size (Note: Key: A – all adults RV – registered voters LV – likely voters V – unclear)	Margin of error	Sid Miller	Nate Sheets	Undecided
University of Houston/YouGov	January 20–31, 2026	550 (LV)	± 4.2%	48%	18%	34%

=== Results ===
Results by county Sheets: 50–60%; 60–70%; Miller: 50–60%; 60–70%; 70–80%

2026 Texas Commissioner of Agriculture Republican primary
Party	Candidate	Votes	%
Republican	Nate Sheets	1,044,698	52.7
Republican	Sid Miller (incumbent)	938,857	47.3
Total votes		1,983,555	100.0

== Democratic primary ==
=== Candidates ===
==== Nominee ====
- Clayton Tucker, rancher and founder of the Texas Progressive Caucus

=== Endorsements ===
Clayton Tucker

U.S. representatives

- Lloyd Doggett, TX-37 (1995–present)
- Greg Casar, TX-35 (2023–present)
- Jamie Raskin, MD-08 (2017–present)

Statewide Officials

- Jim Hightower, former Texas Agriculture Commissioner (1983–1991)

Labor unions

- Texas AFL-CIO
- Texas American Federation of Teachers

=== Results ===
2026 Texas Commissioner of Agriculture Democratic primary
Party	Candidate	Votes	%
Democratic	Clayton Tucker	1,928,300	100.0
Total votes		1,928,300	100.0

== Third parties ==
=== Libertarian convention ===
The Libertarian convention took place on April 12, 2026, with ecologist and agricultural consultant Austin R. Kelly securing the party's nomination unopposed.

=== Green convention ===
The Green convention took place on April 11, 2026. Alfred Molison, the party's candidate for the same office in 2022, was nominated. He later withdrew.

== General election ==
The construction boom of data centers caused by the development of A.I. systems has become a major issue in the campaign. There are hundreds of sites planned for construction in rural areas of the state which has led to Texas having one of the highest number of data centers in the country. Critics of these projects express concerns over the energy, water, and other resources that are consumed by the centers are placing a strain on local infrastructure. Incumbent Commissioner Sid Miller has been vocal about his concerns with the rapid expansion and has called for a moratorium on new construction. Miller has also requested that Governor Abbott call a special legislative session on the issue. Democratic nominee Clayton Tucker has made a moratorium on the construction of new data centers a main plank of his campaign. Tucker and Miller both attended a forum in Matagorda County against data centers with Miller saying of Tucker "I'd never endorse a Democrat, I've never campaigned for a Democrat, but this guy, he's right on the issue."

=== Post-primary endorsements ===
Nate Sheets (R)

Newspapers

- Austin American-Statesman
- The Dallas Morning News
- Houston Chronicle
Declined to endorse

Statewide officials

- Sid Miller, incumbent Texas Agriculture Commissioner (2015–present) (Republican)

Newspapers

- San Antonio Express-News

=== Fundraising ===
Campaign finance reports as of October 24, 2026
Candidate	Raised	Spent	Cash on hand
Nate Sheets (R)	$1,471,557	$1,585,758	$208,735
Clayton Tucker (D)	$832,048	$570,429	$276,906
Source: Texas Ethics Commission

=== Polling ===
Poll source	Date(s) administered	Sample size	Margin of error	Nate Sheets (R)	Clayton Tucker (D)	Other	Undecided
Texas Public Opinion Research	October 15–18, 2026	969 (LV)	± 3.9%	50%	48%	2% (Note: Austin Kelly (L) with 2%)	–
University of Houston	October 10–14, 2026	2,000 (LV)	± 2.2%	46%	40%	2% (Note: Austin Kelly (L) with 2%)	12%
Stratus Intelligence (R)	September 22–24, 2026	865 (LV)	± 3.5%	47%	41%	—	12%
Texas Public Opinion Research	September 19–22, 2026	1,007 (LV)	± 3.6%	46%	44%	2% (Note: Austin Kelly (L) with 2%)	7%
Texas Southern University	September 15–19, 2026	1,800 (LV)	± 2.3%	45%	39%	2% (Note: Austin Kelly (L) with 2%)	14%
Texas Public Opinion Research	August 21–24, 2026	1,000 (LV)	± 3.3%	44% (Note: With voters who lean towards a given candidate)	40%	5% (Note: "Would not vote in that race" with 3%; Austin Kelly (L) & Alfred Molison (G) with 1%)	11%

=== Results ===
2026 Texas Commissioner of Agriculture election
Party	Candidate	Votes	%	±%
Democratic	Clayton Tucker	4,993,724	51.3	
Republican	Nate Sheets	4,540,149	46.6	
Libertarian	Austin Kelly	199,124	2.0	
Total votes		9,732,997	100.0%	
Democratic gain from Republican				
