= Endeavor Energy Resources =

Defunct company engaged in hydrocarbon exploration

- Company type: Defunct
- Industry: Oil and gas
- Founded: 1979; 46 years ago
- Founder: Autry Stephens
- Defunct: September 11, 2024; 10 months ago
- Fate: Acquired by Diamondback Energy

Endeavor Energy Resources was a company engaged in hydrocarbon exploration. It was one of the largest private oil producers in the contiguous United States. In September 2024, it was acquired by Diamondback Energy.

== History ==
The company was founded in 1979 by Autry Stephens. The company's first purchase was 80 acres of land on which it drilled its first well, McClintic B-30 #2, in the Spraberry Trend. It grew by acquiring tough-to-drill wells that other companies did not want.

In 2005, the company acquired Perenco Energy (later LCX Energy).

In April 2017, the company launched a $300 million joint venture with a subsidiary of Ares Management.

After Stephens was diagnosed with prostate cancer, he sold the company to provide liquidity for his family.

After an auction process, in September 2024, one month after Stevens died, Diamondback Energy acquired the company for $26 billion.
