= Sid Miller (politician) =

American politician (born 1955)

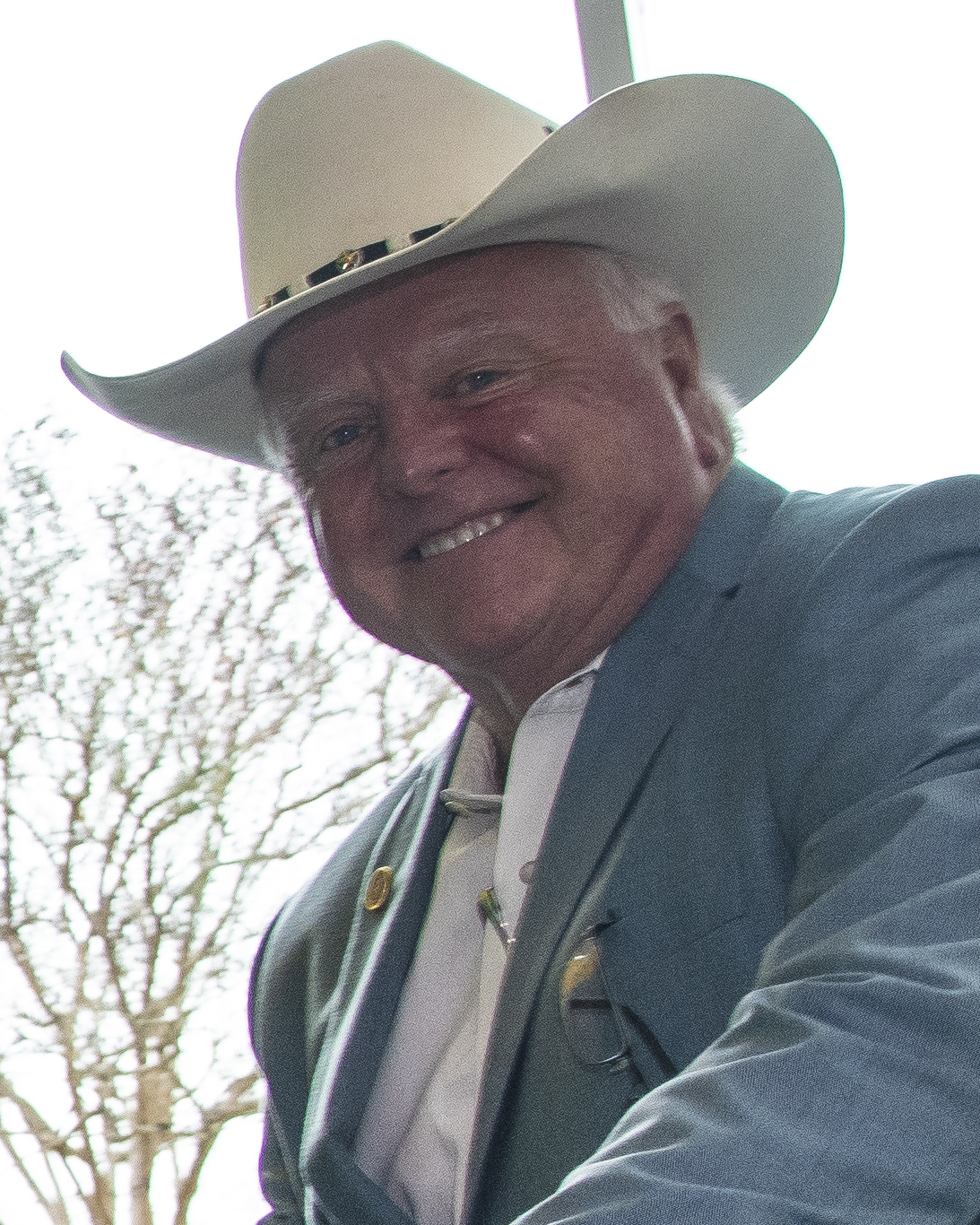
- Miller in 2020

12th Agriculture Commissioner of Texas
- Incumbent
- Assumed office January 2, 2015
- Governor: Rick Perry; Greg Abbott
- Preceded by: Todd Staples

Member of the Texas House of Representatives from the 59th district
- In office January 9, 2001 – January 8, 2013
- Preceded by: David Lengefeld
- Succeeded by: J. D. Sheffield

Personal details
- Born: Sidney Carroll Miller; September 6, 1955 (age 71) De Leon, Texas, U.S.
- Party: Republican
- Spouse: Debra Miller
- Children: 2
- Education: Cisco College (AA); Tarleton State University (BS)
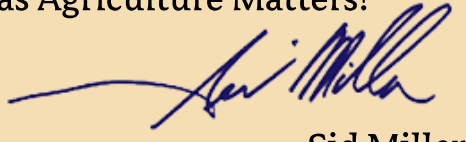
- Signature

Sidney Carroll Miller (born September 6, 1955) is an American politician from Stephenville, Texas. A member of the Republican Party, he serves as the Texas Agriculture Commissioner since January 2015.

From 2001 to 2013, Miller served in the Texas House of Representatives for District 59 in central Texas, being unseated in the Republican runoff election held on July 31, 2012, by physician J. D. Sheffield.

He has been criticized for his promotion of right-wing conspiracy theories and falsehoods. Miller ran for re-election in 2026, but lost in the Republican primary to Nate Sheets who subsequently lost the general election to Clayton Tucker, the first Democrat to win Texas Agriculture Commissioner in 36 years.

== Early life and education ==
Miller was born in De Leon, Texas. He graduated from De Leon High School. He received an Associate of Arts degree from Cisco Junior College and in 1978, received a Bachelor of Science in Vocational Agriculture Education from Tarleton State University. He operates an agricultural business known as Miller Nursery, where he grows trees, shrubs and decorative plants near Stephenville, Texas.

== Texas House of Representatives ==
In 2003 and 2007, Miller introduced bills to legalize the export of horse meat from Texas for human consumption abroad. The bill would have repealed a 1949 state law that prohibits the sale or transport in Texas of horsemeat intended for human consumption. Neither measure was enacted; the legislation passed the House in 2003, but died in a Senate committee, while the 2007 measure never made it out of a House committee.

In 2011, Miller authored legislation (dubbed the "Pork Chopper Bill") that allowed licensed hunters to contract with landowners to shoot feral hogs and coyotes on their property via helicopter.

The conservative Miller was unseated in the Republican runoff election held on July 31, 2012, by osteopathic physician J. D. Sheffield of Gatesville in Coryell County. In 2013, two complaints filed against Miller with the Texas Ethics Commission alleged campaign finance irregularities and failure to disclose loan repayments from his campaign.

=== Ethics Commission cases ===
Beginning in 2013, the Texas Ethics Commission has investigated four ethics complaints against Miller filed by attorney Mark McCaig.

"Frustrated with the commission's lag time in resolving the issues," McCaig withdrew the complaints in a 2016 letter. Nevertheless, the Commission continued investigating, and dismissed one complaint in December 2016. In June 2017, the Commission resolved two of the complaints, sanctioning Miller for improper accounting in reporting political contributions and expenditures and fined him $2,750. Miller's spokesman characterized the investigation as "nothing more than a politically motivated witch hunt" over "very minor technical issues."

== Texas Agriculture Commissioner ==
=== 2018 election ===
On November 13, 2017, Miller announced he would seek re-election in 2018. He won the March 6, 2018, Republican primary with about 56% of the vote, defeating two challengers. Miller won the general election, defeating Kim Olson.

=== 2022 election ===
Miller considered challenging Governor Greg Abbott in the Republican primary in 2022, but in June 2021 he announced he would seek re-election to a third term as Ag Commissioner. He was challenged in the Republican primary by State Representative James White of Hillister, who announced his campaign the same month. He won the March 2022 Republican primary with Trump's endorsement, obtaining 58.5% of the vote to White's 31.1% (a third candidate, rancher and economics professor Carey Counsil, received 10.4% of the votes.

=== 2026 election ===
On March 3, 2026, Miller would lose renomination in the 2026 Republican primary by a margin of 52% to 47% to Nate Sheets, who was backed by Texas Governor Greg Abbott. This would mark the first time in years that a statewide Republican official in Texas had lost their primary race. The loss also came in spite of the fact that Miller had received a late endorsement from Republican U.S. President Donald Trump.

=== Tenure ===
Miller took office on January 2, 2015. In his first official action as commissioner, Miller granted full amnesty to cupcakes at a press conference on January 12, 2015, in which he drew attention to a previous repeal of a ban on junk food in Texas schools. In Miller's first nine months in office, he awarded $413,700 in bonuses to 144 staffers. In 2016, the Austin American-Statesman reported that Miller awarded two newly created $180,000/year positions to political allies, both of whom Miller owed a combined $116,000 in campaign payments.

==== Operation Maverick ====
In 2015, the Texas Department of Agriculture under Miller launched "Operation Maverick", an effort to enforce consumer protection laws requiring Texas businesses to register scales used to buy or sell by weight with the agency. In the program's first fifteen months, some 1,000 retailers were "notified they need to register their scales, which, depending on the industry and type of scale, can cost anywhere from $12 to $400."

In 2017, following the initiative, the Texas Legislature passed a bill (approved by the House in a 146–1 vote and by the Senate in a 31–0 vote) to end the regulation of scales used by certain restaurants. Miller opposed this bill, calling it "horse hockey" and urging Governor Greg Abbott to veto it.

==== Mississippi trip ====
In February 2015, Miller took a trip to compete in the Dixie National Rodeo in Jackson, Mississippi using Texas state funds. Miller's office initially defended the use of state funds, explaining that the commissioner intended to meet with Mississippi agriculture officials. When the meeting fell through, Miller reimbursed the state using campaign funds and $16.79 from his nursery's business account. In December 2018, the Texas Ethics Commission fined Miller $500 for the trip; a report released by the commission stated "No meetings besides the horse show appear on any official Texas Agriculture Department schedules," and that Miller "has not adequately explained why he initially reimbursed the state with political funds before reimbursing his political account with personal funds."

==== School nutrition ====
Six months after taking office, Miller reversed a ban, instituted in 2004 by then-Agriculture Commissioner Susan Combs, on soft drinks and fried foods in public schools. Miller said that local school districts should have the freedom to make decisions regarding food choices for their schools. Eight of the state's ten largest school districts, including Dallas, Fort Worth, Fort Bend County, Austin, and Laredo, said that they would retain their local policies of providing nutritious foods and not serving soft drinks. The move was criticized by nutritionists and experts in public health; a spokeswoman for Miller's department said that the policy change was intended "to be a symbolic move giving more control to schools, not a directive for districts to reinstall fryers or soda machines."

==== Farm Fresh Initiative ====
Shortly after taking office, Miller created the Farm Fresh Initiative (including Farm Fresh Fridays), a farm-to-table program for Texas schools. The initiative has led many school nutrition programs to expand the program beyond one day of the week.

==== Agriculture department fee increases ====
In October 2015, Miller directed the TDA to increase 117 agriculture-related fees effective January 1, 2017. In announcing the fee increases, Miller said the changes were necessary to recover regulatory costs. The fee increases were criticized by the San Antonio Express-News, which urged Miller to drop the fee increase and legislators to determine whether the department is underfunded. Early in 2017, Miller called for raising his agency fees by another $5 million after $11 million in increases in 2016 for higher costs of licensing, registration, and inspection. Miller called the proposed increase "essential money" to keep his department operating and blamed legislative cuts for the need for the higher fees. The fee increase proposals were criticized by some, such as Republican State Representatives Ron Simmons and Larry Gonzales.

In the first nine months of 2015, Miller awarded $413,700 in one-time cash bonuses to 144 Agriculture Department employees, more than any statewide elected official. The bonus awards were criticized by government watchdog groups because of Miller's proposal to raise $20 million in fees for licenses, registrations and other services, and because Miller had dubbed himself a "fiscal hawk".

In an editorial, the San Antonio Express-News questioned why Miller as a state House member voted against increased appropriations for the agriculture department but as commissioner sought additional revenue for the department. When a $50 million budget request submitted by Miller was rejected by lawmakers in 2015, the commissioner proposed higher fees for department certifications, inspections, and registrations, a proposal rejected by a bipartisan group of state legislators as well as the American Farm Bureau Federation and Lieutenant Governor Dan Patrick. Representative John Otto of Dayton, the chairman of the House Appropriations Committee, said that fee hikes could result in lost revenue to the department because farmers and ranchers may choose alternative services. In an editorial, The Express-News urged Miller to drop the fee increase and legislators to determine whether the department is underfunded.

==== War on credit card skimmers ====
Throughout 2016 and 2017, Miller carried out a "war on credit card skimmers". The inspection initiative was designed to fight the illegal practice of capturing (or skimming) credit card information from gas pumps. Miller appeared in a video with tips to avoid being skimmed; the initiative received national attention.

==== Oklahoma trip ====
In February 2015, Miller sought state reimbursement for expenses incurred on a trip to Oklahoma, saying that he had an appointment with Oklahoma legislators, a scheduled tour of the Oklahoma National Stockyards, and a meeting with Oklahoma's chief agriculture official. Miller stated that the travel was for a public business purpose based on a brief chat with state legislators at the Oklahoma State Capitol, but the legislators said that they did not invite Miller or expect him on the day in question, the president of the stockyards said that Miller did not go on tour, and Miller later acknowledged "that he requested the meeting with the Oklahoma agriculture official - and then did not show up."

The Houston Chronicle subsequently reported that during the trip, Miller visited a doctor in Oklahoma City to receive a "Jesus shot"—an injection administered consisting of Dexamethasone, Kenalog, and Vitamin B12 that is "administered only by a single Oklahoma City-area doctor who claims that it takes away all pain for life." Miller subsequently said that he had received the medication in the past to treat chronic pain, but declined "to confirm or deny whether he received the injection during the February 2015 trip." Miller later reimbursed the state $1,500. After an investigation, the Texas Department of Public Safety declined to pursue any charges against Miller.

==== Feral hogs ====
In 2017, Miller approved the statewide use of "Kaput Feral Hog Lure" —a bait containing the poison warfarin—in order to kill feral hogs, which have increased in population in Texas and other states. Miller said that the use of the substance would be a "major new weapon" against destructive feral hogs, stating: "I am pleased to announce that the 'feral hog apocalypse' may be within Texans' reach." The approval prompted criticism from members of the hunting community and others who opposed the introduction of a poison into the environment.

The hogs number perhaps two million and cause more than $50 million in annual damage. A judge in Austin halted Miller's proposal after Wild Boar Meats, a North Texas hog processor, sued on grounds that the poison may have unintended consequences. The San Antonio Express-News editorial board opposes the use of the poison due to the risk it could impact the food chain, taint hog meat used for pet food, and poison non-targeted wildlife such as deer.

Meanwhile, state senator Kirk Watson of Austin and state representative Lynn Stucky of Denton County, a veterinarian, filed legislation to refer the feral hog matter to a university study to determine the impact the poison would have on the land, agriculture, and hunters before the Miller plan could take effect.

==== Confederate license plates ====
In 2018, Miller wrote a letter in support a proposed Sons of Confederate Veterans Texas license plate that would glorify the Confederacy, and offered to sponsor the license plate. The group's proposal is a long-running controversy in Texas.

==== Anti-transgender dress code ====
In April 2023, amid a wider push by the Texas state government to adopt policies targeting transgender people, Miller issued a "dress code and grooming policy" that ordered Texas Department of Agriculture employees, interns, and contractors to dress "in a manner consistent with their biological gender" and said that employees could be disciplined, including terminated, for failing to do so. Attorneys for the ACLU of Texas said that the rules violated Title VII (which prohibits employment discrimination), the First Amendment, and the Equal Protection Clause.

== Other political activities ==
=== Role in Donald Trump's presidential campaign ===
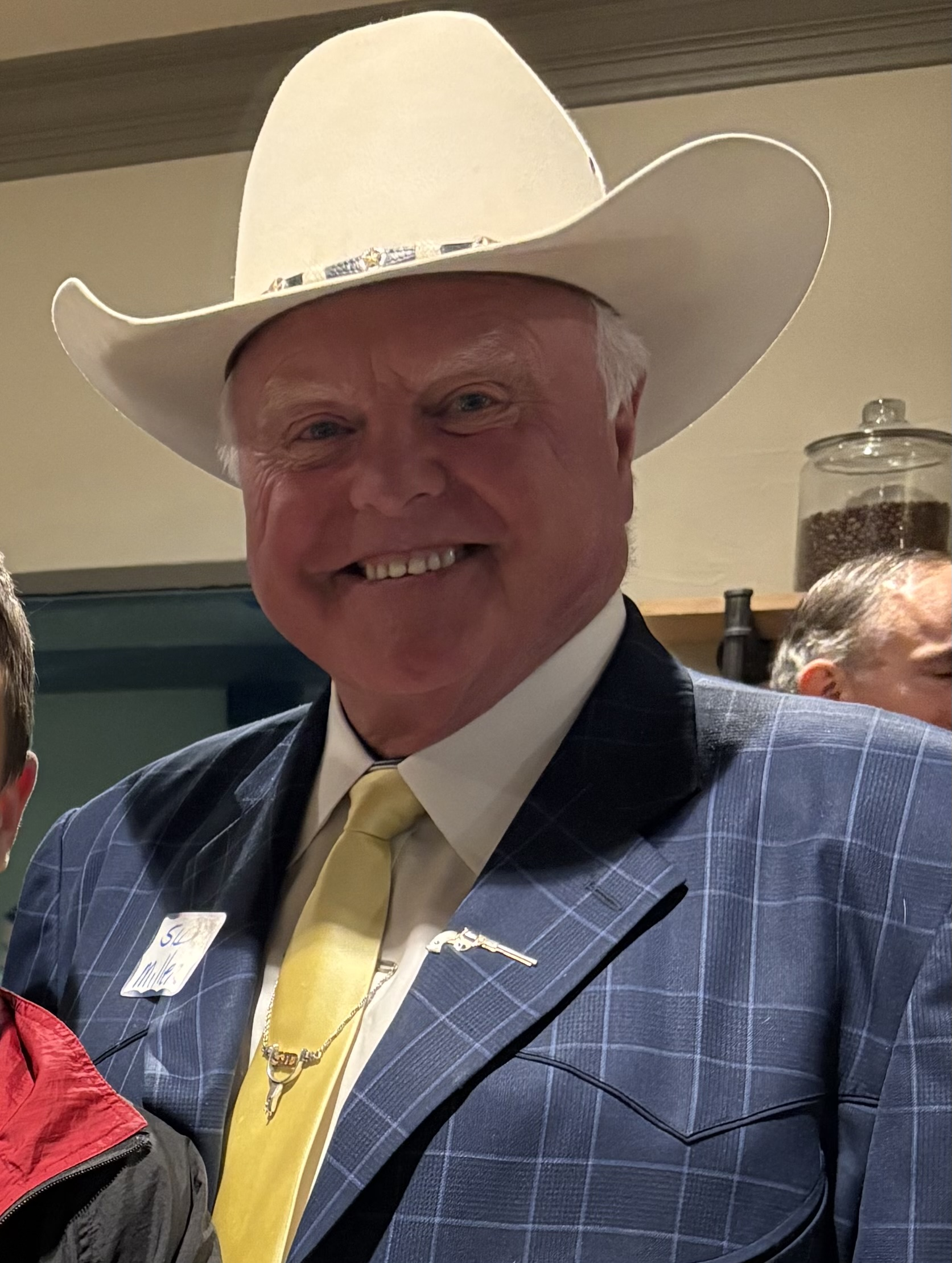
A photo of Miller at a Wise County (Texas) Conservatives state candidate forum, where he spoke, on 4 December 2025.

In the 2016 presidential election, Miller was a key Texas supporter of Republican Donald Trump. A founding member of Trump's Agricultural Advisory Board, Miller spoke at a Trump rally at the Travis County Exposition Center in Austin in May 2016. In the campaign's final days, Miller made multiple appearances on the Fox News Channel in support of Trump, while Trump praised Miller and his "big, beautiful, white cowboy hat" at rallies.

After the November 2016 election, Miller was thought to be a possible Trump choice to join the Cabinet as U.S. Secretary of Agriculture. President Trump later appointed Georgia Governor Sonny Perdue as Secretary of Agriculture.

In July of 2024, Miller kicked off a bus tour, routing through battleground states across the country, in support of Donald Trump's bid for a second term in the White House. He was mentioned as a potential candidate to the post of United States Secretary of Agriculture in the Second cabinet of Donald Trump.

=== Social media controversies ===
In August 2015, Miller posted a cartoon on his Facebook page that suggested the United States should launch a nuclear attack on the Middle East. The text read: "Japan has been at peace with the US since August 9, 1945. It's time we made peace with the Muslim world." The background was of a nuclear explosion. Miller received harsh criticism for the post and eventually removed it, but he termed the cartoon "thought provoking" and vowed not to apologize for his action.

In December 2015, Miller wrote on his Facebook page, "If one more person says Happy Holidays to me I just might slap them. Either tell me Merry Christmas or just don't say anything," in a post accompanied by a picture of a cowboy on a steer in front of a sign saying "We will never take Christ out of Christmas". The post received backlash, in which critics claimed the post encouraged violence and ignored other holidays; the Texas Democratic Party responded to the post by saying "Happy Holidays".

In November 2016, a tweet appeared on Miller's official Twitter account calling Hillary Clinton a "cunt"; the tweet was condemned by both Democratic and Republican officials. In a statement, Texas Governor Greg Abbott called the tweet "an embarrassment." The tweet was deleted within fifteen minutes. Miller apologized for the tweet. Miller's campaign at first blamed a hacker, and then a staff member. The campaign subsequently said that it had fired the employee responsible, saying that the individual was a "third-party vendor" hired to do social media.

In May 2019, Miller received backlash from Muslim groups after posts on Facebook and Twitter called for Austin Mayor Steve Adler to not attend a Ramadan event headlined by Rep. Ilhan Omar. Miller tweeted "I am shocked to learn that Austin's Jewish Mayor Steve Adler plans to share the stage at an upcoming Ramadan dinner with controversial Minnesota Rep. Ilhan Omar. I urge him to cancel his dinner reservation!". Miller followed up with a Facebook post classifying Omar's remarks as "hate speech" and saying that "repeated attacks upon the Jewish State of Israel have no place in a city like Austin that prides itself on diversity and inclusiveness."

=== Promotion of false news stories ===
A Texas Tribune analysis of "a portion of Miller's social media history" from late 2014 to late 2016 identified ten instances in which Miller posted fake news—"demonstrably false, misleading or unsupported information"—to Facebook and Twitter. For example, in March 2015, Miller posted on his Facebook a fake photo of President Obama holding a Che Guevara T-shirt and labeled the president "disgraceful." In 2018, after learning that a photo Miller shared on Facebook - showing Whoopi Goldberg wearing a shirt depicting Donald Trump shooting himself in the head - was doctored, Miller's campaign spokesman, Todd Smith, said that "We post hundreds of things a week. We put stuff out there. We're like Fox News. We report, we let people decide."

In 2017, Miller posted on his campaign's Facebook page a story about two Texas hunters supposedly attacked while camping by Mexican illegal immigrants. In fact, a subsequent police investigation determined that the hunters had shot each other and falsely blamed it on border-crossers. Presidio County Sheriff Danny Dominguez, who investigated the shooting, suggested that Miller "needs to do his job and stick to that, and I'll do my job."

=== George Soros conspiracy theories ===
In 2020, Miller shared George Soros conspiracy theories. Miller falsely claimed that Soros was paying protestors involved in protests over the murder of George Floyd.

=== Promotion of disinformation on 2020 presidential election ===
After Joe Biden's victory against Donald Trump in the 2020 presidential election, Miller repeated Trump's unsubstantiated claims of mass voter fraud. He promoted 2000 Mules, a propaganda film by Republican operative Dinesh D'Souza that promoted false claims of mass voter fraud.

=== False claims about 2021 Texas power outages ===
In February 2021, while Texas was suffering power outages amid a snowstorm, Miller falsely claimed that wind power was primarily at fault for the power outages, and wrote that "We should never build another wind turbine in Texas."

=== Lawsuit against the U.S. Department of Agriculture ===
In April 2021, Miller sued the federal government over provisions within the American Rescue Plan Act of 2021 for defining "socially disadvantaged farmers and ranchers" (eligible for a debt-relief program under the Act) as people of color. Miller sued in his individual capacity as a citizen and rancher, rather than in his official capacity as Texas agriculture commissioner. Miller's filing asserted that the program unconstitutionally excluded "white ethnic groups that have unquestionably suffered." The suit, which plaintiffs aimed to make into a class action, was sponsored by America First Legal, a group founded by former Trump administration officials, most notably former senior advisor Stephen Miller.

The suit blocked aid to Black farmers for a time. In 2022, all parties agreed to the case's dismissal, agreeing that it was moot after Inflation Reduction Act replaced the ARPA debt-relief program with a similar program that made no mention of race.

== Personal life ==
Miller and his wife, Debra, live in Stephenville; they have two sons. The Millers are active members of the Erath County Cowboy Church, where he is an elder. An avid rodeo participant, Miller holds nine world championship titles. According to his official biography, he is a member of the Houston Livestock Show and Rodeo, the Associated General Contractors of America, American Quarter Horse Association, and the American Nursery and Landscape Association.

== Electoral history ==
Texas House of Representatives 59th district election, 2000
Party	Candidate	Votes	%
Republican	Sid Miller	18,566	54.40
Democratic	David Lengefeld (inc.)	15,561	45.60

Texas House of Representatives 59th district election, 2002
Party	Candidate	Votes	%
Republican	Sid Miller (inc.)	16,186	56.75
Democratic	David Lengefeld	12,337	43.25

Texas House of Representatives 59th district election, 2004
Party	Candidate	Votes	%
Republican	Sid Miller (inc.)	27,621	63.90
Democratic	Rodney Nauert	15,603	36.10

Texas House of Representatives 59th district election, 2006
Party	Candidate	Votes	%
Republican	Sid Miller (inc.)	15,235	55.54
Democratic	Ernie Casbeer	12,198	44.46

Texas House of Representatives 59th district election, 2008
Party	Candidate	Votes	%
Republican	Sid Miller (inc.)	28,482	61.64
Democratic	Ernie Casbeer	16,546	35.81
Libertarian	Coy Reynolds	1,178	2.55

Texas House of Representatives 59th district Republican primary election, 2010
Party	Candidate	Votes	%
Republican	Sid Miller (inc.)	7,248	55.83
Republican	J. D. Sheffield	5,734	44.17

Texas House of Representatives 59th district election, 2010
Party	Candidate	Votes	%
Republican	Sid Miller (inc.)	19,985	74.87
Independent	Will Bratton	6,707	25.13

Texas House of Representatives 59th district Republican primary election, 2012
Party	Candidate	Votes	%
Republican	Sid Miller (inc.)	7,778	42.48
Republican	J. D. Sheffield	7,599	41.50
Republican	Mike Jones	2,932	16.01

Texas House of Representatives 59th district Republican primary runoff election, 2012
Party	Candidate	Votes	%
Republican	J. D. Sheffield	8,675	54.79
Republican	Sid Miller (inc.)	7,157	45.21

Texas Agriculture Commissioner Republican primary election, 2014
Party	Candidate	Votes	%
Republican	Sid Miller	411,560	34.56
Republican	Tommy Merritt	249,440	20.95
Republican	Eric Opiela	207,222	17.40
Republican	Joe Cotten	174,348	14.64
Republican	Allen Carnes	148,222	12.45

Texas Agriculture Commissioner Republican primary election runoff, 2014
Party	Candidate	Votes	%
Republican	Sid Miller	364,756	53.20
Republican	Tommy Merritt	320,835	46.80

Texas Agriculture Commissioner election, 2014
Party	Candidate	Votes	%
Republican	Sid Miller	2,699,508	58.60
Democratic	Jim Hogan	1,697,227	36.84
Libertarian	David "Rocky" Palmquist	132,518	2.88
Green	Kenneth Kendrick	77,557	1.68

Texas Agriculture Commissioner Republican primary election, 2018
Party	Candidate	Votes	%
Republican	Sid Miller	755,498	55.65
Republican	Jim Hogan	310,431	22.87
Republican	Trey Blocker	291,583	21.48

Texas Agriculture Commissioner election, 2018
Party	Candidate	Votes	%
Republican	Sid Miller	4,221,527	51.26
Democratic	Kim Olson	3,822,137	46.41
Libertarian	Richard Carpenter	191,639	2.33

Texas Agriculture Commissioner Republican primary election, 2022
Party	Candidate	Votes	%
Republican	Sid Miller	992,330	58.48
Republican	James White	528,434	31.14
Republican	Carey A. Counsil	176,083	10.38

Texas Agriculture Commissioner election, 2022
Party	Candidate	Votes	%
Republican	Sid Miller	4,480,186	56.33
Democratic	Susan Hays	3,473,603	43.67

Party political offices
Preceded by Todd Staples	Republican nominee for Agriculture Commissioner of Texas; 2014, 2018, 2022	Succeeded by Nate Sheets
Political offices
Preceded by Todd Staples	Agriculture Commissioner of Texas; 2015–present	Incumbent
