= De Leon, Texas =

- City
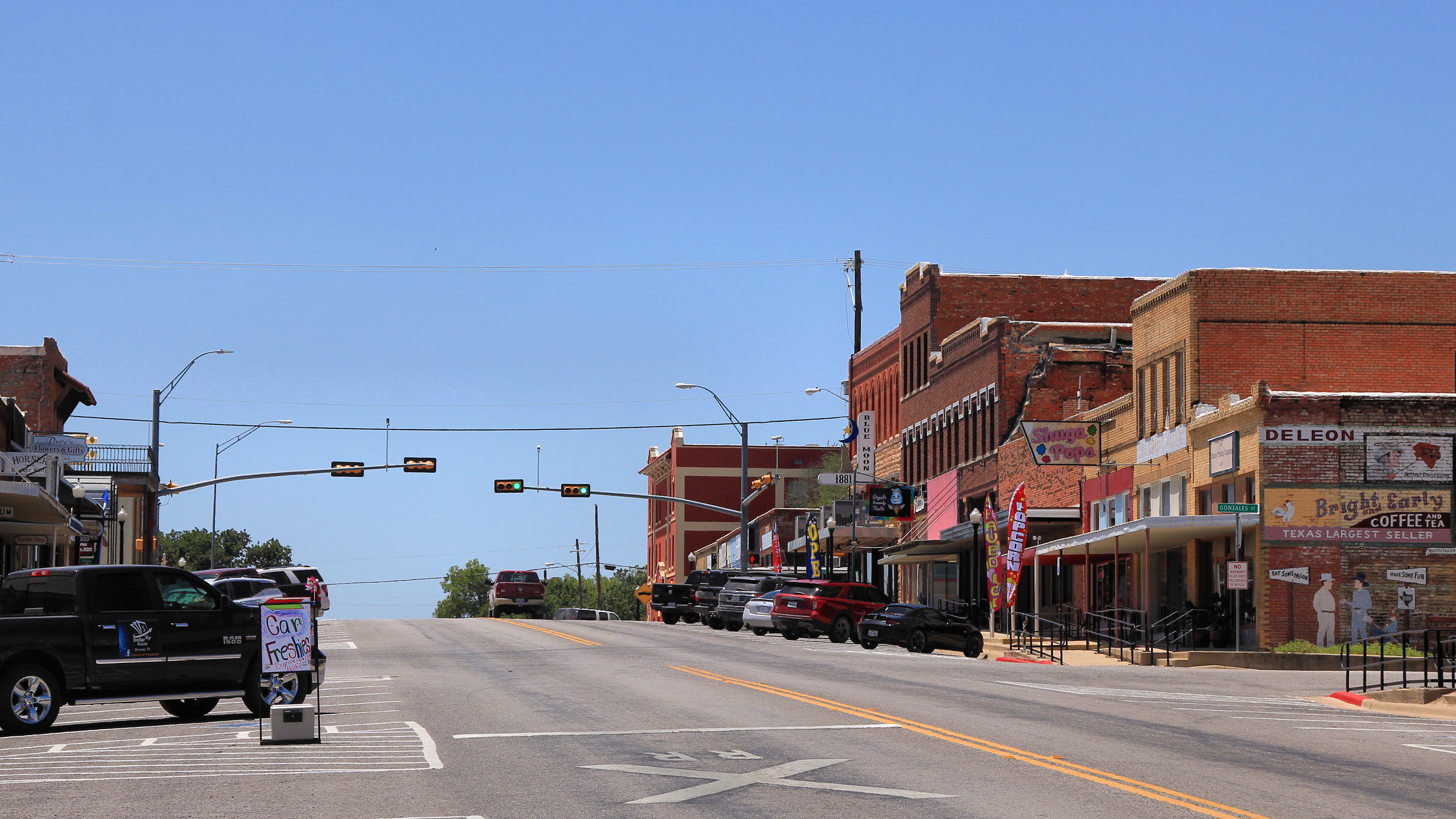
- Downtown De Leon, Texas

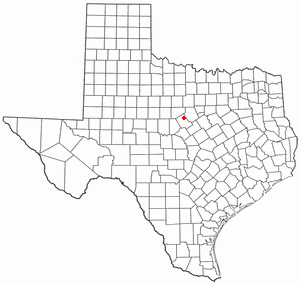
- Location of De Leon, Texas

- Coordinates: 32°06′41″N 98°32′07″W
- Country: United States
- State: Texas
- County: Comanche

Area
  - Total: 2.24 sq mi (5.81 km^{2})
  - Land: 2.24 sq mi (5.81 km^{2})
  - Water: 0 sq mi (0.00 km^{2})
- Elevation: 1,270 ft (390 m)

Population (2020)
  - Total: 2,258
  - Density: 1,010/sq mi (389/km^{2})
- Time zone: UTC-6 (Central (CST))
  - Summer (DST): UTC-5 (CDT)
- ZIP code: 76444
- Area code: 254
- FIPS code: 48-19672
- GNIS feature ID: 2410304
- Website: www.cityofdeleon.org

De Leon (/dɪ ˈliːɒn/ dih LEE-on) is a city located in Comanche County in the U.S. state of Texas. Its population was 2,258 in the 2020 census. It is commonly associated with being named after the Spanish explorer Ponce de León, but the town is actually named for its location on the Leon River (de León in Spanish), which flows directly north and east of the community, and drains into nearby Proctor Lake.

== History ==
The town was laid out in April 1881 by surveying crews of the Texas Central Railway as part of the historic Missouri-Kansas-Texas Railroad (KATY) as it constructed a line from Ross just north of the Waco area, to Stamford, with the ultimate goal of extending the line to Colorado. The first city lots were auctioned on July 7, 1881, by Robert Morris Elgin, the Texas Central's land agent and for whom the town of Elgin had been named.

Initially incorporated by an election held on August 30, 1890, the town government appears to have dwindled over the years, and the community was reincorporated in an election held August 29, 1899. The first mayor elected under the new incorporation was former Comanche County Judge John Lambert, who took office in April 1900.

=== Expulsion of the Black population ===
After a murder that led to the lynching of a Black suspect, the white residents of Comanche County visited all black residents and told them to leave the county within 10 days. In fact, the lack of Black population was later a source of civic pride. At the railroad station, a sign read "Nigger, don't let the sun go down on you in this town." Black porters would hide in the baggage cars in Comanche County.

=== Arrival of the train line ===
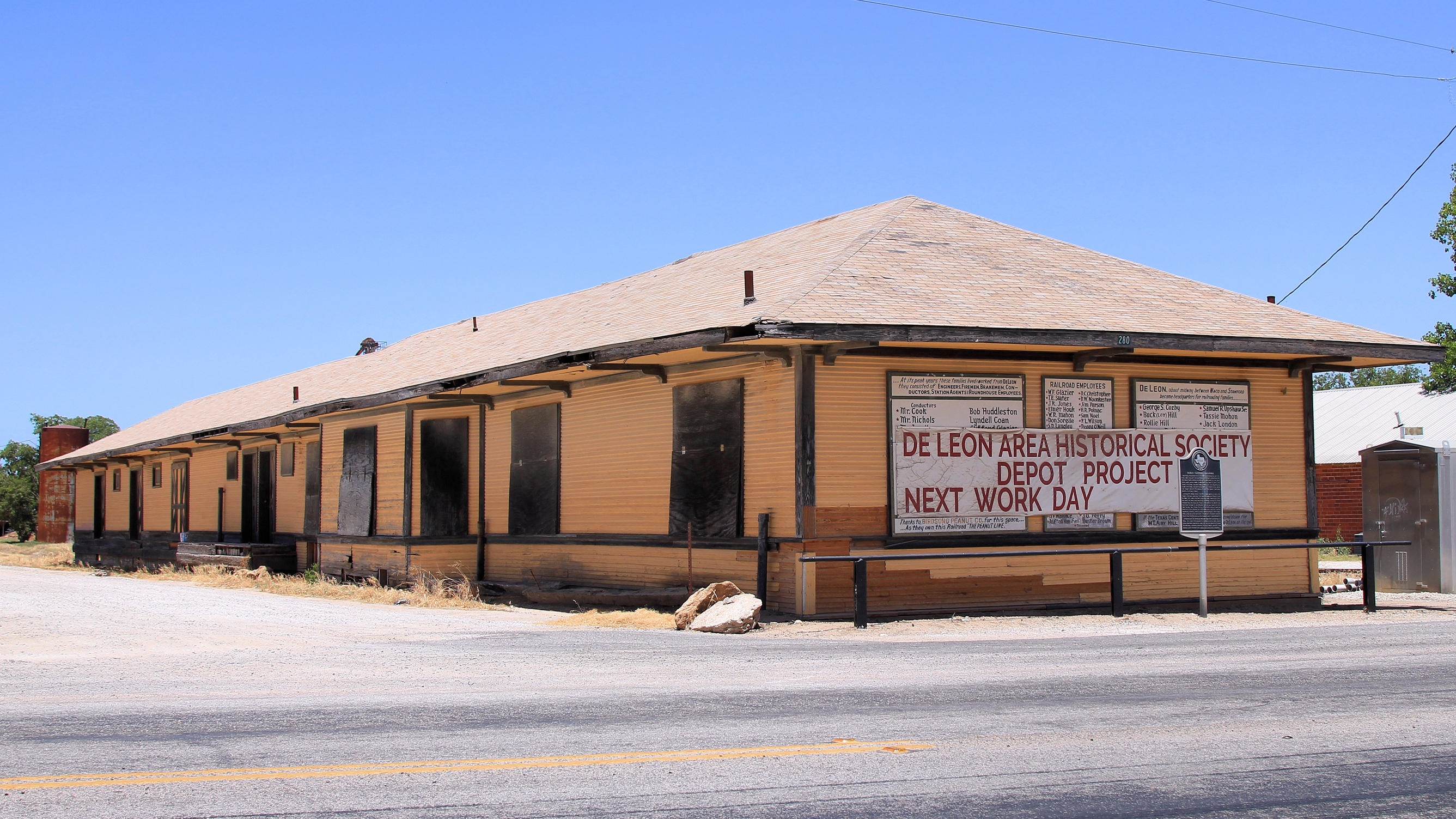
Former train station in De Leon

The population of De Leon remained under 1,000 until 1910, when a branch of the Texas Central line, then leased by the Katy Railroad, was constructed from De Leon to Rising Star and Cross Plains. It was the only town in Comanche County with railroad service and a station. De Leon then became the center point for the Katy between Waco, Albany, and Cross Plains, thereby relocating numerous railroad crew members and their families to the city. The census of 1910 showed 1,015 citizens. De Leon continues to retain its rail service and the former Texas Central Katy line from Dublin to Gorman, nicknamed the "Peanut Line", is currently operated by the Fort Worth and Western Railroad.

On Labor Day night 1918, oil was discovered north of De Leon just inside the Comanche County line near Desdemona. During the next two years, nearly 1000 wells were drilled in the area, and the population of De Leon rose to an estimate of more than 5,000 people. The boom was short-lived, though, and by the time the actual was census taken in 1920, the population was only 3,302. Since World War II, De Leon's population has stabilized at approximately 2,500.

Ranching dominated Comanche County until the coming of the Texas Central in 1881. Cotton soon became the primary crop, as immigrants from the Southern states, and in particular the area around Oxford and Pontotoc, Mississippi, came to the De Leon vicinity, starting in 1890. When the boll weevil began to make inroads in the area after 1910, farmers just west of town began to plant the small Spanish peanut. That quickly became the predominant crop, and in 1913, the De Leon Peanut Company was organized. Over time, Comanche County became the leading peanut-producing county in the U.S. Coupled with production around the neighboring community of Gorman in Eastland County, most of the peanuts went into candy, particularly Curtis Candies' Baby Ruth and Butterfinger candy bars. Nabisco eventually purchased the De Leon Peanut Company. In the 21st century, peanut production has dropped dramatically.

De Leon has one of the oldest festivals in Texas, the De Leon Peach and Melon Festival, which had its beginnings in 1914. Celebrated during the first full week in August, it draws thousands to its numerous events, including a carnival, tractor pulls, car show, and a free cold watermelon slicing. The current watermelon seed-spitting distance record, as recognized by the Guinness Book of World Records, of 75 feet 2 inches, was set at the festival on August 12, 1995, by Jason Schayot, then of Georgetown, Texas. Schayot is a descendant of two long-time De Leon families.

Among De Leon's unique events is the only paid appearance by Elvis Presley in which he sang only gospel music. It took place at Hodges Park on July 4, 1955, when he followed his friends, the Blackwood Brothers, at the Battle of Songs show. The Blackwoods had lost family members in a plane crash in Alabama the previous year, just prior to a scheduled appearance in De Leon, and had remembered them in a performance immediately preceding Presley's performance. Presley followed with more gospel music. It was one of three appearances Presley made that day for promoter W.B. Nowlin, then mayor of De Leon. The other two were in Brownwood and Stephenville.

Included among De Leon's most distinguished citizens are former Texas Speaker of the House and later Lieutenant Governor Ben Barnes, a protégé of John B. Connally and Lyndon B. Johnson, and the 1955 Pulitzer Prize winner William White, whose The Taft Story focuses upon Republican presidential contender Robert A. Taft. Winston Lee Moore, composer and singer of "Don't Let the Stars Get in Your Eyes", was reared just north of De Leon. He is better known under his stage name, Slim Willet. Former State Representative Sid Miller was born in De Leon in 1955; he was a candidate for Texas Agriculture Commissioner in the Republican primary election scheduled for March 4, 2014.

Buried in the De Leon Cemetery is Cyrus Campbell, an early resident, who was the blacksmith who made the leg irons placed on Mexican General Antonio López de Santa Anna following his capture at the Battle of San Jacinto. According to Campbell's family tradition, his three brothers and he were the men who actually captured Lopez de Santa Anna the day following the battle.

The town motto, "Busiest Town, Friendliest People", is a reminder of the slower-paced lifestyle still available in a few communities in this country.

== Geography ==
According to the United States Census Bureau, the city has a total area of 2.1 square miles (5.4 km^{2}), all land.

=== Climate ===
The climate in this area is characterized by relatively high temperatures and evenly distributed precipitation throughout the year. The Köppen climate classification describes the weather as humid subtropical, Cfa.

Climate data for De Leon, Texas
Month	Jan	Feb	Mar	Apr	May	Jun	Jul	Aug	Sep	Oct	Nov	Dec	Year
Mean daily maximum °F (°C)	50 (10)	60 (16)	73 (23)	83 (28)	83 (28)	93 (34)	97 (36)	99 (37)	86 (30)	79 (26)	70 (21)	60 (16)	78 (26)
Mean daily minimum °F (°C)	27 (−3)	28 (−2)	45 (7)	52 (11)	59 (15)	62 (17)	67 (19)	71 (22)	58 (14)	49 (9)	38 (3)	28 (−2)	49 (9)
Average precipitation inches (mm)	1.3 (33)	2.4 (61)	2.7 (69)	2.3 (58)	4.4 (110)	4.1 (100)	2.6 (66)	2.8 (71)	2.5 (64)	3.6 (91)	1.9 (48)	1.2 (30)	32 (810)
Source: Weatherbase

== Demographics ==
Historical population
Census	Pop.	Note	%±
1890	364		—
1900	807		121.7%
1910	1,015		25.8%
1920	3,302		225.3%
1930	1,766		−46.5%
1940	1,971		11.6%
1950	2,241		13.7%
1960	2,022		−9.8%
1970	2,170		7.3%
1980	2,478		14.2%
1990	2,190		−11.6%
2000	2,433		11.1%
2010	2,246		−7.7%
2020	2,258		0.5%
U.S. Decennial Census

=== 2020 census ===
As of the 2020 census, De Leon had a population of 2,258 people living in 907 households and 590 families. The median age was 40.5 years, 24.4% of residents were under 18, 21.7% were 65 years of age or older, 93.3 males lived for every 100 females overall, and 86.7 males lived for every 100 females age 18 and over.

0.0% of residents lived in urban areas, while 100.0% lived in rural areas.

There were 907 households in De Leon, of which 31.6% had children under 18 living in them. Of all households, 44.9% were married-couple households, 19.7% had a male householder with no spouse or partner present, and 29.4% had a female householder with no spouse or partner present. About 32.5% of all households were made up of individuals and 18.7% had someone living alone who was 65 years of age or older. There were 1,050 housing units, of which 13.6% were vacant. The homeowner vacancy rate was 2.4% and the rental vacancy rate was 7.3%.

Racial composition as of the 2020 census
Race	Number	Percent
White	1,620	71.7%
Black or African American	16	0.7%
American Indian and Alaska Native	21	0.9%
Asian	1	0.0%
Native Hawaiian and Other Pacific Islander	1	0.0%
Some other race	209	9.3%
Two or more races	390	17.3%
Hispanic or Latino (of any race)	744	32.9%

=== 2000 census ===
As of the census of 2000, 2,433 people, 949 households, and 605 families resided in the city. The population density was 1,175.1 inhabitants per square mile (453.7/km^{2}). The 1,127 housing units averaged 544.3 per square mile (210.2/km^{2}). The racial makeup of the city was 86.72% White, 0.12% African American, 0.29% Native American, 0.04% Asian, 0.04% Pacific Islander, 10.69% from other races, and 2.10% from two or more races. Hispanics or Latinos of any race were 27.54% of the population.

Of the 949 households, 31.3% had children under 18 living with them, 48.6% were married couples living together, 10.6% had a female householder with no husband present, and 36.2% were not families. About 33.5% of all households were made up of individuals, and 21.8% had someone living alone who was 65 or older. The average household size was 2.47, and the average family size was 3.16.

In the city, the population was distributed as 28.0% under 18, 7.0% from 18 to 24, 23.4% from 25 to 44, 19.6% from 45 to 64, and 21.9% who were 65 years of age or older. The median age was 38 years. For every 100 females, there were 87.6 males. For every 100 females 18 and over, there were 81.6 males.

The median income for a household in the city was $19,563, and for a family was $29,167. Males had a median income of $25,802 versus $19,583 for females. The per capita income for the city was $11,451. About 23.4% of families and 25.8% of the population were below the poverty line, including 34.1% of those under age 18 and 20.1% of those age 65 or over.

== Education ==
The City of De Leon is served by the De Leon Independent School District.

In May 2009, a bond was passed, and a new high school was built.

== Gallery ==
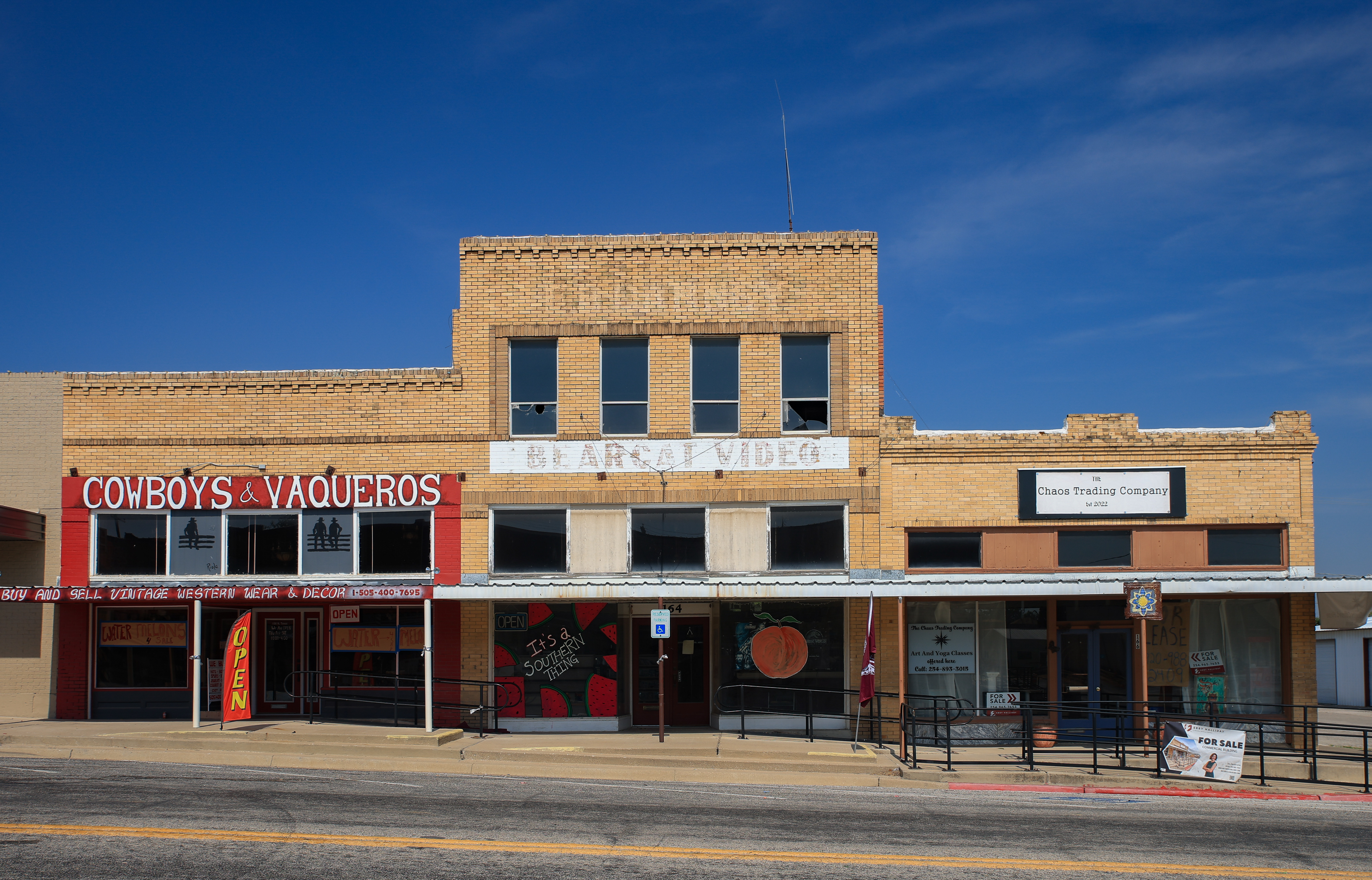
Old building in downtown De Leon

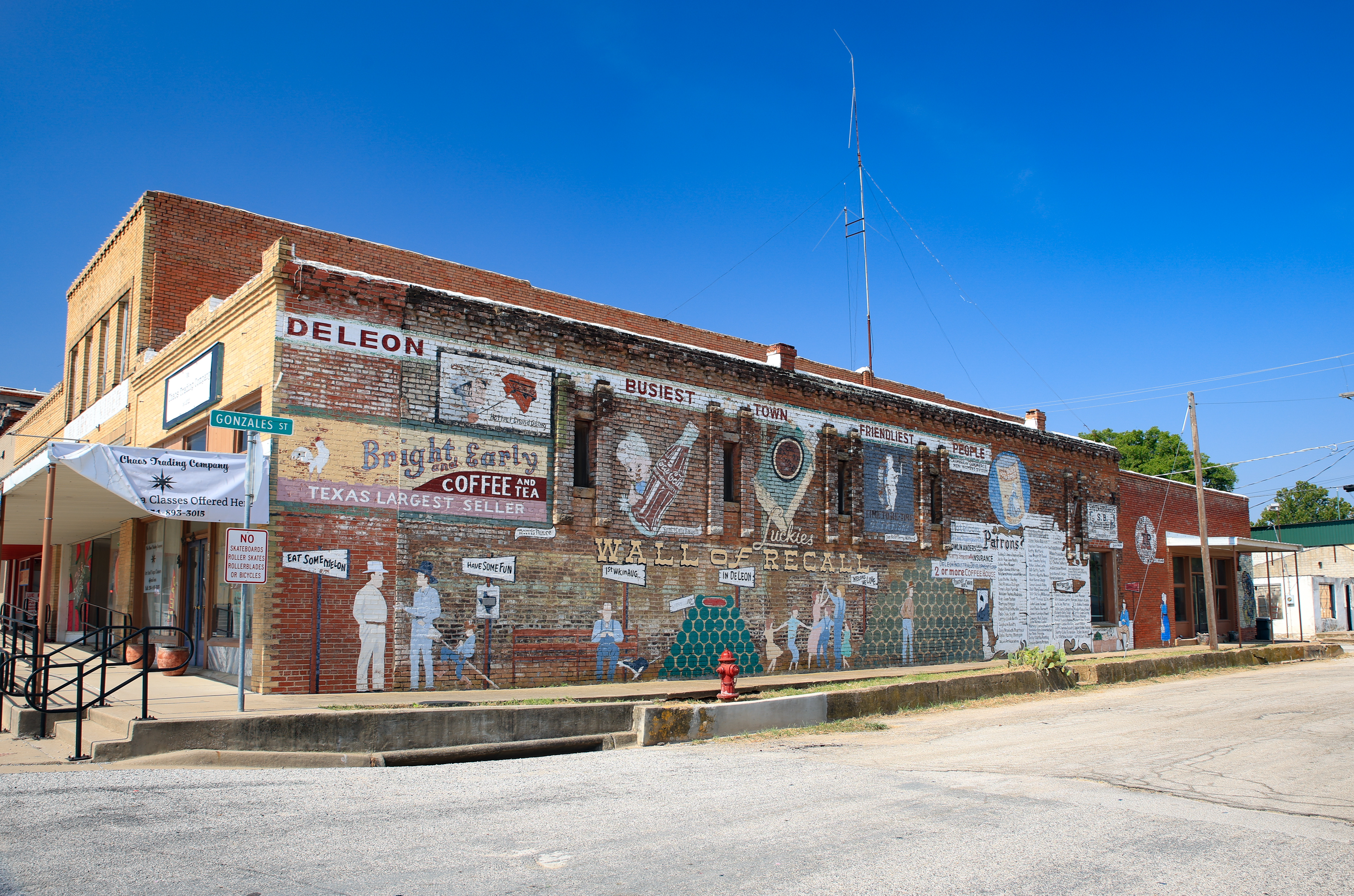
Mural in downtown De Leon

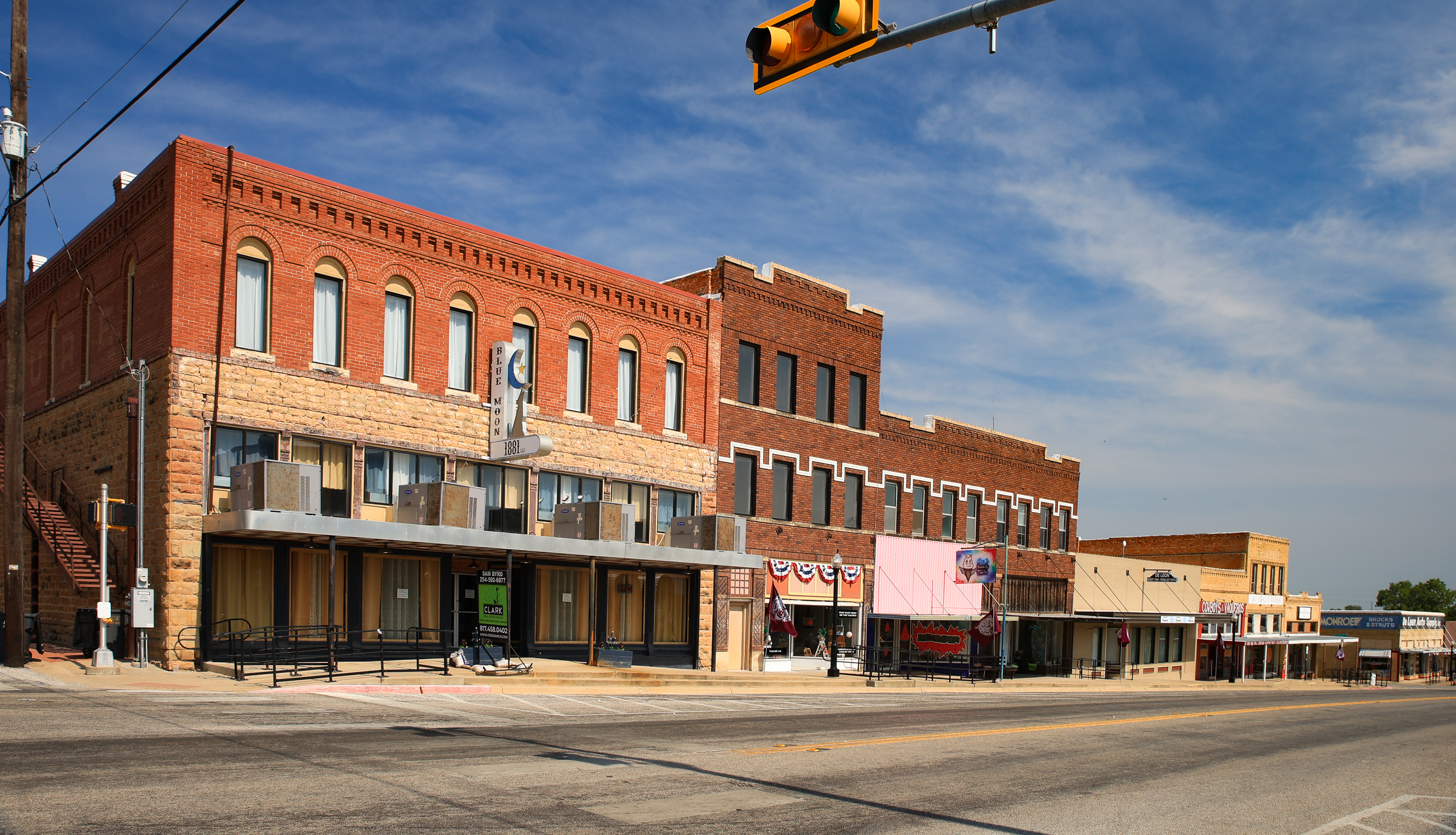
Downtown De Leon

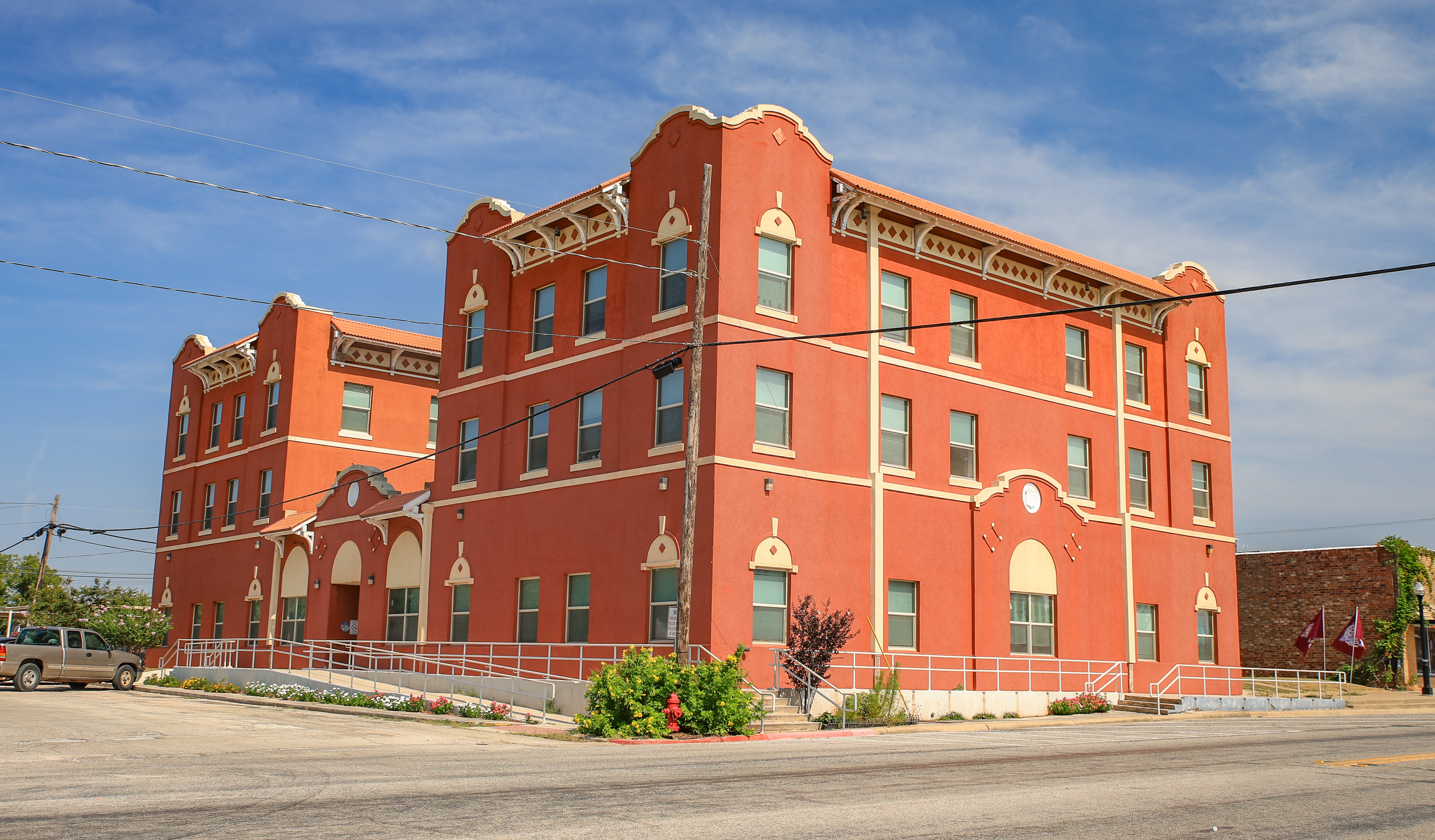
Old building in downtown De Leon

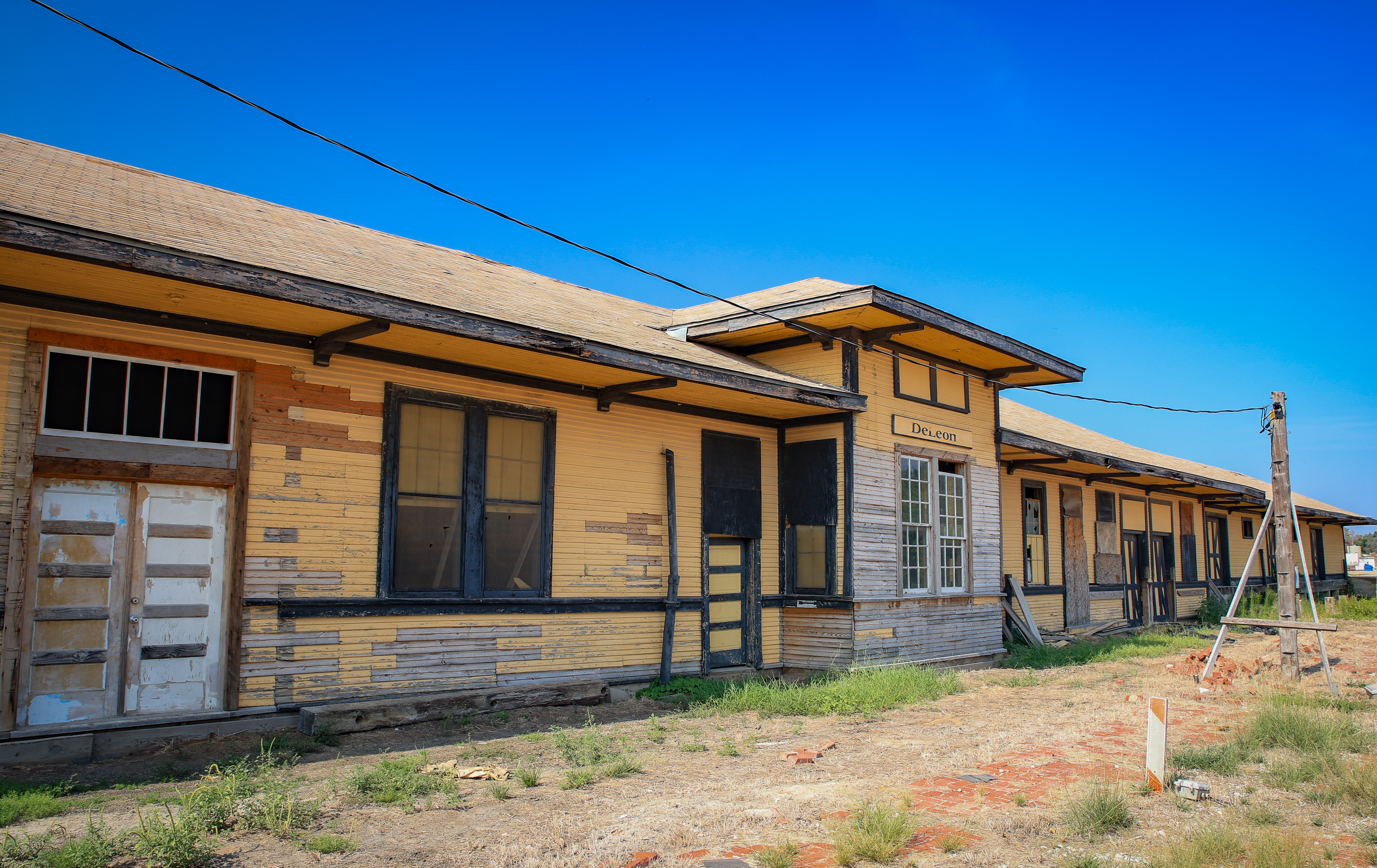
Historic train depot in De Leon

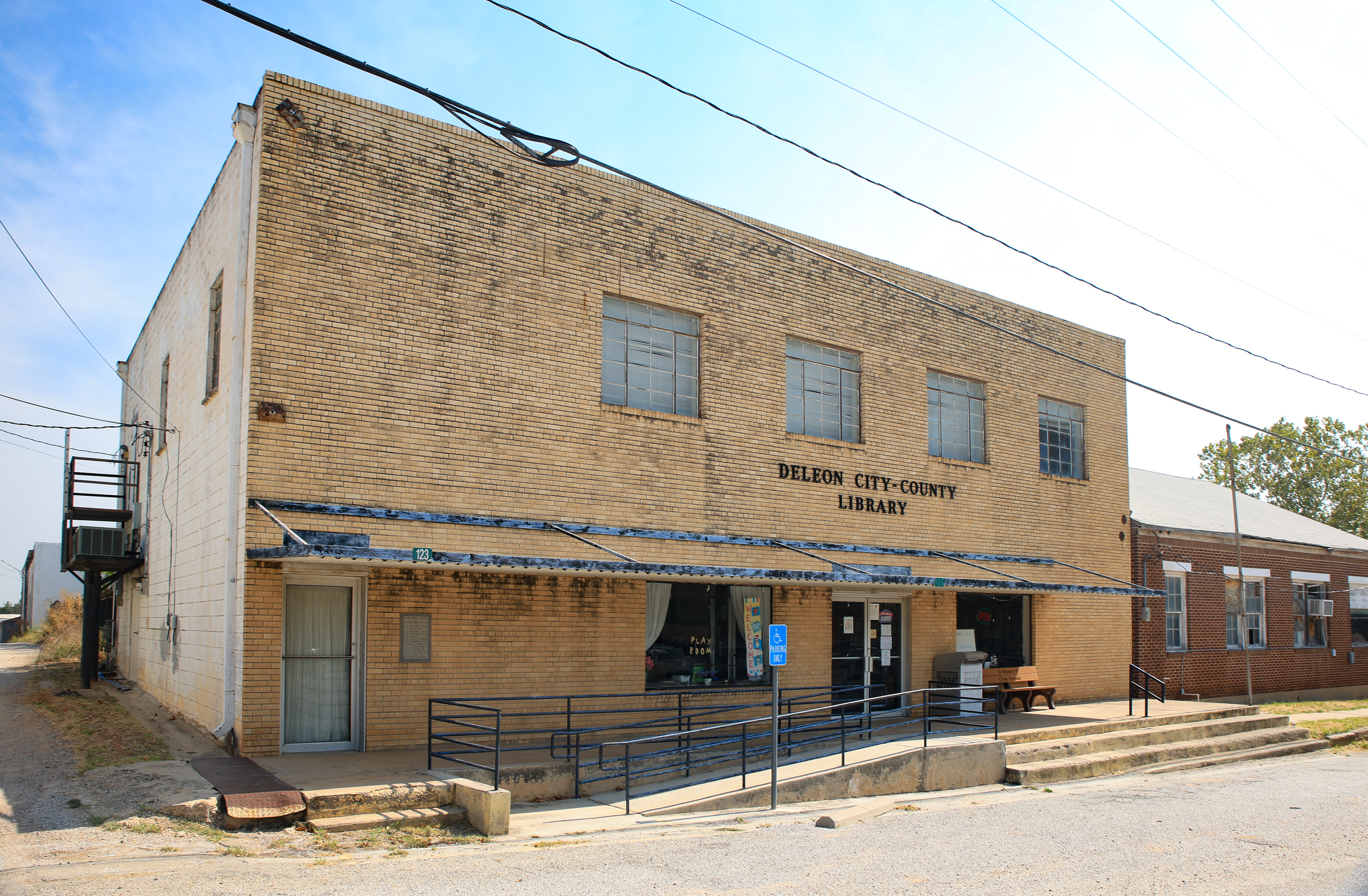
Library

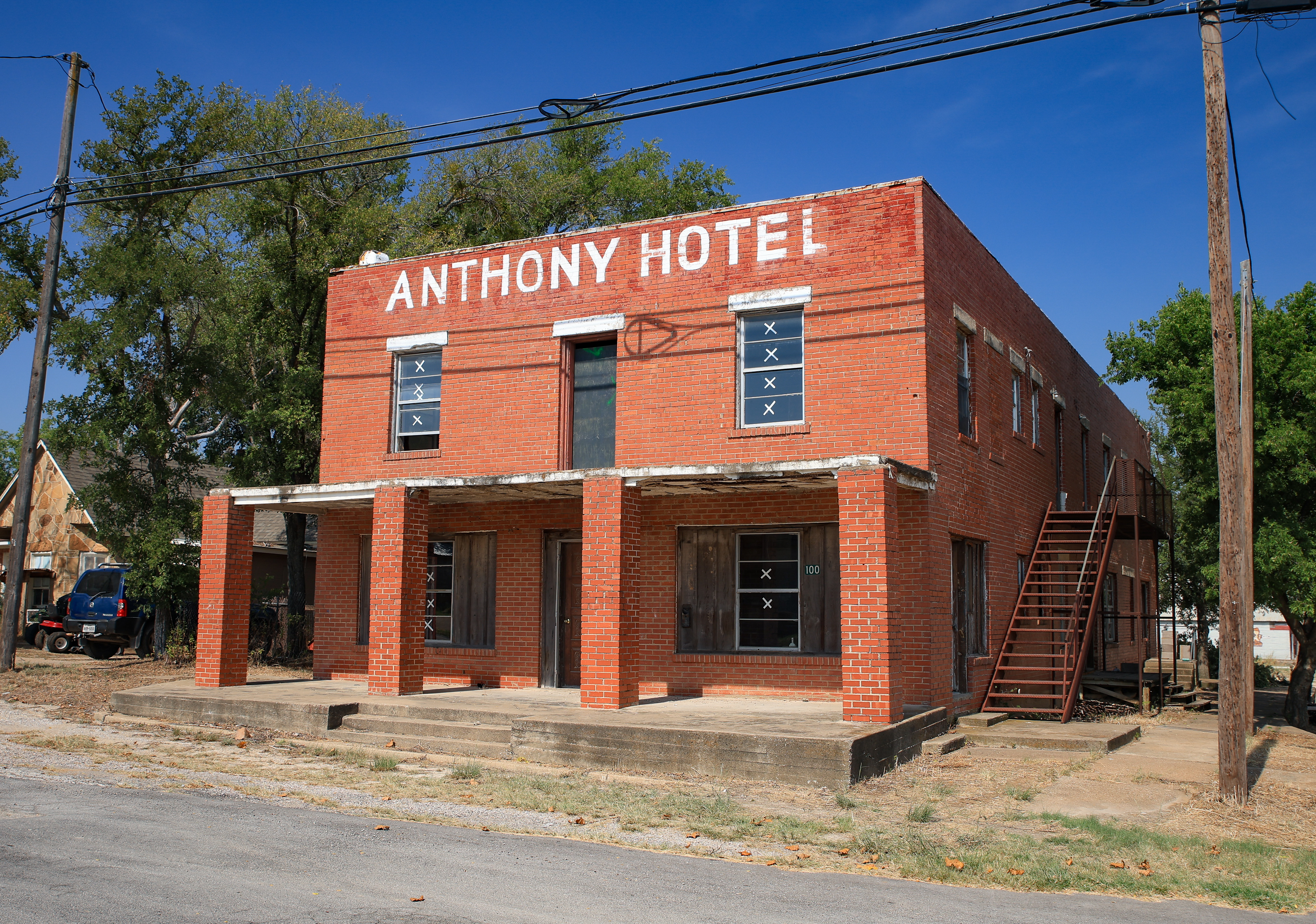
Historic Anthony Hotel in De Leon

== See also ==
- List of sundown towns in the United States
