= KVRP =

KVRP may refer to:

- KVRP-FM, a radio station (97.1 FM) licensed to Haskell, Texas, United States
- KVRP (AM), a radio station (1400 AM) licensed to Stamford, Texas, United States
