= List of Farm to Market Roads in Texas (2700–2799) =

- Texas Farm to Market Road and Ranch to Market Road markers

Highway names
- Interstates: Interstate Highway X (IH-X, I-X)
- US Highways: U.S. Highway X (US X)
- State: State Highway X (SH X)
- Loops: Loop X
- Spurs: Spur X
- Recreational: Recreational Road X (RE X)
- Farm or Ranch to Market Roads: Farm to Market Road X (FM X); Ranch to Market Road X (RM X)
- Park Roads: Park Road X (PR X)

System links
- Highways in Texas; Interstate; US; State; Former; Toll; Loops; Spurs; FM/RM; Park; Rec

Farm to Market Roads in Texas are owned and maintained by the Texas Department of Transportation (TxDOT).

== FM 2700 ==
Farm to Market Road 2700
- Location: Callahan County
- Length: 1.159 mi (1.865 km)
- Existed: September 20, 1961–present

Farm to Market Road 2700 (FM 2700) is located in Callahan County. It runs from FM 604 south of Clyde westward 1.2 miles (1.9 km) to FM 18.

FM 2700 was designated on September 20, 1961, along the current route. A westward extension 3.2 miles (5.1 km) to FM 603 was designated on August 29, 1989, pending acceptance the county. This extension was automatically cancelled due to lack of acceptance and remains under county jurisdiction.

== FM 2701 ==
Farm to Market Road 2701
- Location: Haskell and Knox counties
- Length: 2.33 mi (3.75 km)
- Existed: September 20, 1961–present

Farm to Market Road 2701 (FM 2701) is located in Haskell and Knox counties. It runs from FM 2229 east of O'Brien north 2.3 miles (3.7 km) to SH 222 in Knox City.

FM 2701 was designated on September 20, 1961, along the current route.

== FM 2702 ==
Farm to Market Road 2702
- Location: Jones County
- Length: 3.191 mi (5.135 km)
- Existed: May 20, 1961–present

Farm to Market Road 2702 (FM 2702) is located in Jones County. It runs from US 277 southwest of Stamford, at the eastern terminus of SH 92, eastward 3.2 miles (5.1 km) to SH 6, where it continues as CR 206.

FM 2702 was designated on May 20, 1961, along the current route.

== FM 2703 ==
Farm to Market Road 2703
- Location: Jones County
- Length: 1.011 mi (1.627 km)
- Existed: September 20, 1961–present

Farm to Market Road 2703 (FM 2703) is located in Jones County. It runs from FM 142 east of Stamford southward 1 mile (1.6 km) before state maintenance ends at CR 210. The roadway continues as CR 241.

FM 2703 was designated on September 20, 1961, along the current route.

== FM 2704 ==
Farm to Market Road 2704
- Location: Bosque County
- Existed: September 20, 1961–July 2, 1965

Farm to Market Road 2704 (FM 2704) was located in Bosque County. No highway currently uses the FM 2704 designation.

FM 2704 was designated on September 20, 1961, running from FM 56 north of Valley Mills eastward 2.6 miles (4.2 km) to a county road. The highway was extended further east 1.2 miles (1.9 km) on May 2, 1962. FM 2704 was cancelled on July 2, 1965, with the mileage being transferred to FM 1637.

== FM 2705 ==
Farm to Market Road 2705
- Location: Limestone County
- Length: 5.809 mi (9.349 km)
- Existed: 1961–present

Farm to Market Road 2705 (FM 2705) is located in Limestone County.

== FM 2706 ==
Farm to Market Road 2706
- Location: Anderson County
- Length: 3.521 mi (5.667 km)
- Existed: 1961–present

Farm to Market Road 2706 (FM 2706) is located in Anderson County.

== FM 2707 ==
Farm to Market Road 2707
- Location: Coleman and Callahan counties
- Length: 5.887 mi (9.474 km)
- Existed: January 30, 1963–present

Farm to Market Road 2707 (FM 2707) is located in Coleman and Callahan counties.

=== FM 2707 (1961) ===
Farm to Market Road 2707
- Location: Hamilton County
- Existed: September 20, 1961–October 9, 1961

FM 2707 was first designated on September 20, 1961, running from FM 2005 east of Pecan Wells southeast 3.7 miles (6.0 km) to a county road. The highway was cancelled on October 9, 1961, with the mileage being transferred to FM 1047.

== FM 2708 ==
Farm to Market Road 2708
- Location: Cherokee County
- Length: 2.055 mi (3.307 km)
- Existed: 1961–present

Farm to Market Road 2708 (FM 2708) is located in Cherokee County. It runs about 2 miles (3.2 km) from an intersection with a county road northward to an intersection with SH 21 in Linwood.

FM 2708 was designated on September 20, 1961.

== FM 2709 ==
Farm to Market Road 2709
- Location: Henderson County
- Length: 9.47 mi (15.24 km)
- Existed: 1961–present

Farm to Market Road 2709 (FM 2709) is located in Henderson County.

It was originally Ranch to Market Road 2709 (RM 2709).

== FM 2710 ==
Farm to Market Road 2710
- Location: Smith County
- Length: 9.353 mi (15.052 km)
- Existed: September 20, 1961–present

Farm to Market Road 2710 is a 9.353-mile (15.052 km) state road in northern Smith County that connects SH 16 in Lindale with FM 14 in Red Springs.

== FM 2711 ==
Farm to Market Road 2711
- Location: Ochiltree County
- Length: 16.595 mi (26.707 km)
- Existed: 1962–present

Farm to Market Road 2711 (FM 2711) is located in Ochiltree County.

=== FM 2711 (1961) ===
Farm to Market Road 2711
- Location: Angelina County
- Existed: September 20, 1961–1962

FM 2711 was first designated on September 20, 1961, to run from US 69, 1.5 mi north of Clawson, east 1.0 mile (1.6 km). This route was cancelled by 1962.

== FM 2712 ==
Farm to Market Road 2712
- Location: Houston County
- Length: 1.815 mi (2.921 km)
- Existed: 1961–present

Farm to Market Road 2712 (FM 2712) is located in Houston County.

== FM 2713 ==
Farm to Market Road 2713
- Location: Nacogdoches County
- Length: 3.829 mi (6.162 km)
- Existed: September 20, 1961–present

Farm to Market Road 2713 (FM 2713) is a 3.8-mile (6.1 km) route in Nacogdoches County. It connects SH 7 in Swift with FM 2112 in Shady Grove.

== FM 2714 ==
Farm to Market Road 2714
- Location: Fayette County
- Length: 1.917 mi (3.085 km)
- Existed: October 28, 1966–present

Farm to Market Road 2714 (FM 2714) is located in Fayette County.

=== FM 2714 (1961) ===
Farm to Market Road 2714
- Location: Polk and Trinity counties
- Existed: September 20, 1961–May 23, 1966

FM 2714 was first designated on September 20, 1961, running from US 59 north of Corrigan northward 6.0 miles (9.7 km) to a road intersection. The highway was cancelled on May 23, 1966, with the mileage being transferred to FM 357.

== FM 2715 ==
Farm to Market Road 2715 (FM 2715) is a highway that was designated twice. No highway currently uses the FM 2715 designation.

=== FM 2715 (1961) ===
Farm to Market Road 2715
- Location: Shelby County
- Existed: September 20, 1961–December 11, 1961

The first route numbered FM 2715 was designated on September 20, 1961, from SH 7 at Pearce Airfield northwest to FM 699. This route was cancelled 90 days later.

=== FM 2715 (1962) ===
Farm to Market Road 2715
- Location: Clay County
- Existed: May 2, 1962–June 21, 1967

The second route numbered FM 2715 was designated on May 2, 1962, running from FM 171 at Thornberry southeastward to FM 1740 at a distance of approximately 2.4 miles (3.9 km). The highway was extended 2.8 miles (4.5 km) to a road intersection on May 6, 1964. The highway was extended south to SH 79 on June 2, 1967. FM 2715 was cancelled on June 21, 1967, with the mileage being transferred to FM 2393.

== FM 2716 ==
Farm to Market Road 2716
- Location: Delta County
- Length: 2.18 mi (3.51 km)
- Existed: 1962–present

Farm to Market Road 2716 (FM 2716) is located in Delta County.

=== FM 2716 (1961) ===
Farm to Market Road 2716
- Location: Fort Bend County (possibly also Harris County) or Waller County
- Existed: September 20, 1961–December 11, 1961

A previous route numbered FM 2716 was designated on September 20, 1961. It became part of FM 1462 when it was extended.

== FM 2717 ==
Farm to Market Road 2717
- Location: Calhoun County
- Length: 3.468 mi (5.581 km)
- Existed: 1961–present

Farm to Market Road 2717 (FM 2717) is located in Calhoun County.

== FM 2718 ==
Farm to Market Road 2718
- Location: DeWitt County
- Length: 8.526 mi (13.721 km)
- Existed: 1961–present

Farm to Market Road 2718 (FM 2718) is located in DeWitt County.

== FM 2719 ==
Farm to Market Road 2719
- Location: Hill County
- Length: 5.297 mi (8.525 km)
- Existed: November 2, 1962–present

Farm to Market Road 2719 (FM 2719) is located in Hill County.

=== FM 2719 (1961) ===
Farm to Market Road 2719
- Location: Lavaca County
- Existed: September 20, 1961–May 24, 1962

FM 2719 was first designated on September 20, 1961, running from US 90-A in Shiner southwest to a county road at a distance of 3.4 miles (5.5 km). The highway's northern terminus was relocated to SH 95 on May 24, 1962. FM 2719 was cancelled later that day, with the mileage being transferred to FM 966.

== FM 2720 ==
Farm to Market Road 2720
- Location: Hays and Caldwell counties
- Length: 7.169 mi (11.537 km)
- Existed: 1961–present

Farm to Market Road 2720 (FM 2720) is located in Hays and Caldwell counties.

== RM 2721 ==
Ranch to Market Road 2721
- Location: Gillespie and Blanco counties
- Length: 14.179 mi (22.819 km)
- Existed: 1961–present

Ranch to Market Road 2721 (RM 2721) is located in Gillespie and Blanco counties.

== RM 2722 ==
Ranch to Market Road 2722
- Location: Comal County
- Length: 7.677 mi (12.355 km)
- Existed: September 20, 1961–present

Ranch to Market Road 2722 (RM 2722) is located in Comal County. It runs about 7.7 miles (12.4 km) from SH 46 in New Braunfels to FM 2673 in Canyon Lake.

== FM 2723 ==
Farm to Market Road 2723
- Location: Franklin County
- Length: 4.6 mi (7.4 km)
- Existed: 1962–present

Farm to Market Road 2723 (FM 2723) is located in Franklin County.

=== FM 2723 (1961) ===
Farm to Market Road 2723
- Location: Guadalupe County
- Existed: September 20, 1961–December 11, 1961

A previous route numbered FM 2723 was designated on September 20, 1961, to run from FM 78 in McQueeney to US 90. This route was cancelled on December 11, 1961, and became a portion of FM 725.

== FM 2724 ==
Farm to Market Road 2724
- Location: Karnes County
- Length: 8.057 mi (12.966 km)
- Existed: 1961–present

Farm to Market Road 2724 (FM 2724) is located in Karnes County.

== FM 2725 ==
Farm to Market Road 2725
- Location: San Patricio County
- Length: 3.455 mi (5.560 km)
- Existed: 1961–present

Farm to Market Road 2725 (FM 2725) is located in San Patricio County.

== FM 2726 ==
Farm to Market Road 2726
- Location: Washington County
- Length: 3.305 mi (5.319 km)
- Existed: September 20, 1961–present

Farm to Market Road 2726 (FM 2726) is located in Washington County. It runs from FM 1155 near Doe Run Farm to FM 1370.

FM 2726 was designated on September 20, 1961 on the current route.

== FM 2727 ==
Farm to Market Road 2727
- Location: Kaufman County
- Length: 8.385 mi (13.494 km)
- Existed: 1961–present

Farm to Market Road 2727 (FM 2727) is located in Kaufman County.

FM 2727 begins at an intersection with SH 243 east of Kaufman. The highway travels in a northeast direction, running between the two city lakes and Kaufman Lake. FM 2727 turns in a more eastward direction at County Road 140 before briefly turning towards the south and turning back northeast at County Road 103. The highway continues to run in a northeast direction before ending at an intersection with FM 429 southwest of College Mound.

FM 2727 was designated on September 20, 1961, running from SH 243 near Kaufman to County Road 103 at a distance of approximately 4.3 miles (6.9 km). The highway was extended to FM 429 on June 25, 1962, bringing FM 2727 to its current route.

== FM 2728 ==
Farm to Market Road 2728
- Location: Kaufman County
- Length: 18.13 mi (Note: The certified length given is shorter than the actual mileage, as the Texas Department of Transportation description of FM 2728 considers it to be discontinuous at rather than concurrent with US 80 and FM 429.) (29.18 km)
- Existed: 1961–present

Farm to Market Road 2728 (FM 2728) is located in Kaufman County.

FM 2728 begins at an intersection with SH 34 between Kaufman and Oak Ridge. The highway runs northeast through Oak Ridge then runs through more rural areas of the county. FM 2728 runs near Trinity Valley Community College and has an overlap with FM 429. The two highways separate just north of I-20, with FM 2728 running northeast to Elmo. In Elmo, the highway shares an overlap with US 80. FM 2728 continues to run in a northeast direction before turning northeast near County Road 342. The highway continues to run northwest until ending at an intersection with FM 429 near Ables Springs.

FM 2728 was designated on September 20, 1961, running from US 80 in Elmo southwestward to FM 429. The highway was extended 6.5 miles (10.5 km) from FM 429 to SH 34 near Kaufman on May 6, 1964. On May 5, 1966, FM 2728 was extended northeast 3.3 miles (5.3 km) from US 80 in Elmo to road intersection. The highway was extended further north 5.2 miles (8.4 km) to FM 429, bringing FM 2728 to its current routing.

Junction list

The entire route is in Kaufman County.

Location	mi	km	Destinations	Notes
	0.0	0.0	SH 34 – Kaufman, Terrell	
	6.5	10.5	I-20 / FM 429 south – Dallas, Shreveport	South end of FM 429 overlap; I-20 exit 506
	7.0	11.3	FM 429 north – Terrell	North end of FM 429 overlap
Elmo	10.0	16.1	US 80 west – Terrell	South end of US 80 overlap
Elmo	10.2	16.4	US 80 east – Wills Point	North end of US 80 overlap
	18.9	30.4	FM 429 – Terrell, McCoy	
1.000 mi = 1.609 km; 1.000 km = 0.621 mi: Concurrency terminus

== FM 2729 ==
Farm to Market Road 2729
- Location: Grayson County
- Length: 9.09 mi (14.63 km)
- Existed: 1962–present

Farm to Market Road 2729 (FM 2729) is located in Grayson County.

=== FM 2729 (1961) ===
Farm to Market Road 2729
- Location: Cass County
- Existed: September 20, 1961–October 1961

The original FM 2729 was designated on September 20, 1961, to run from FM 250 to Harris Chapel. This became part of FM 161 by the next month.

== FM 2730 ==
Farm to Market Road 2730
- Location: Uvalde County
- Length: 2.659 mi (4.279 km)
- Existed: 1961–present

Farm to Market Road 2730 (FM 2730) is located in Uvalde County.

== FM 2731 ==
Farm to Market Road 2731
- Location: Eastland County
- Length: 7.777 mi (12.516 km)
- Existed: 1961–present

Farm to Market Road 2731 (FM 2731) is located in Eastland County.

== FM 2732 ==
Farm to Market Road 2732
- Location: San Saba County
- Length: 9.949 mi (16.011 km)
- Existed: 1961–present

Farm to Market Road 2732 (FM 2732) is located in San Saba County.

== FM 2733 ==
Farm to Market Road 2733
- Location: Briscoe County
- Length: 2.197 mi (3.536 km)
- Existed: 1961–present

Farm to Market Road 2733 (FM 2733) is located in Briscoe County.

== FM 2734 ==
Farm to Market Road 2734
- Location: Collingsworth County
- Length: 2.986 mi (4.806 km)
- Existed: 1961–present

Farm to Market Road 2734 (FM 2734) is located in Collingsworth County.

== FM 2735 ==
Farm to Market Road 2735
- Location: Bowie County
- Length: 11.285 mi (18.161 km)
- Existed: 1958–present

Farm to Market Road 2735 (FM 2735) is located in Bowie County.

== FM 2736 ==
Farm to Market Road 2736
- Location: Hunt County
- Length: 6.277 mi (10.102 km)
- Existed: 1962–present

Farm to Market Road 2736 (FM 2736) is located in Hunt County.

== FM 2737 ==
Farm to Market Road 2737
- Location: Hunt and Rains counties
- Length: 5.964 mi (9.598 km)
- Existed: 1962–present

Farm to Market Road 2737 (FM 2737) is located in Hunt and Rains counties.

== FM 2738 ==
Farm to Market Road 2738
- Location: Johnson County
- Length: 10.587 mi (17.038 km)
- Existed: 1962–present

Farm to Market Road 2738 (FM 2738) is located in Johnson County.

== FM 2739 ==
Farm to Market Road 2739
- Location: Cooke County
- Length: 3.823 mi (6.153 km)
- Existed: 1962–present

Farm to Market Road 2739 (FM 2739) is located in Cooke County.

== FM 2740 ==
Farm to Market Road 2740
- Location: Young County
- Existed: May 2, 1962–May 22, 1964

Farm to Market Road 2740 (FM 2740) was located in Young County. No highway currently uses the FM 2740 designation.

FM 2740 was designated on May 2, 1962, running from SH 254 at Henry Chapel, northeastward to the Jack county line. The highway was cancelled on May 22, 1964, with the mileage being transferred to FM 1191.

== FM 2741 ==
Farm to Market Road 2741
- Location: Lipscomb County
- Length: 5.672 mi (9.128 km)
- Existed: 1962–present

Farm to Market Road 2741 (FM 2741) is located in Lipscomb County.

== FM 2742 ==
Farm to Market Road 2742
- Location: Coke County
- Length: 2.11 mi (3.40 km)
- Existed: 1962–present

Farm to Market Road 2742 (FM 2742) is located in Coke County.

== FM 2743 ==
Farm to Market Road 2743
- Location: Angelina County
- Length: 5.357 mi (8.621 km)
- Existed: October 28, 1966–present

Farm to Market Road 2743 (FM 2743) is located in Angelina County.

FM 2743 begins at an intersection with SH 63 east of Zavalla. The highway travels east through the Angelina National Forest and intersects FM 3373 before ending at the entrance to Caney Creek Park at Forest Service Road 336.

FM 2743 was designated on October 28, 1966, on its current route.

Junction list

The entire route is in Angelina County.

Location	mi	km	Destinations	Notes
	0.0	0.0	SH 63 – Zavalla, Jasper	
	3.9	6.3	FM 3373 north	
	5.3	8.5	Forest Service Road 336	
1.000 mi = 1.609 km; 1.000 km = 0.621 mi

=== FM 2743 (1962) ===
Farm to Market Road 2743
- Location: Concho County
- Existed: May 2, 1962–May 16, 1966

FM 2743 was first designated on May 2, 1962, running from US 87 east of Eden, northward at a distance of approximately 5.0 miles (8.0 km). The highway was cancelled on May 16, 1966, with the mileage being transferred to RM 2134 (now FM 2134).

== FM 2744 ==
Farm to Market Road 2744
- Location: Fisher County
- Length: 4.334 mi (6.975 km)
- Existed: 1962–present

Farm to Market Road 2744 (FM 2744) is located in Fisher County.

== FM 2745 ==
Farm to Market Road 2745
- Location: Falls County
- Length: 1.806 mi (2.906 km)
- Existed: June 1, 1965–present

Farm to Market Road 2745 (FM 2745) is located in Falls County.

=== FM 2745 (1962) ===
Farm to Market Road 2745
- Location: Jim Wells County
- Existed: May 2, 1962–May 1, 1965

A previous route numbered FM 2745 was designated in Jim Wells County on May 2, 1962, running from FM 716 west of Premont to SH 285 at a distance of approximately 7.4 miles (11.9 km). This route was cancelled on May 1, 1965; the southern 3.8 miles (6.1 km) was transferred to FM 1538, and the remainder was removed from the state highway system.

== FM 2746 ==
Farm to Market Road 2746
- Location: Jones County
- Length: 12.633 mi (20.331 km)
- Existed: 1962–present

Farm to Market Road 2746 (FM 2746) is located in Jones County.

== FM 2747 ==
Farm to Market Road 2747
- Location: Shelby County
- Length: 2.307 mi (3.713 km)
- Existed: September 21, 1965–present

Farm to Market Road 2747 (FM 2747) is located in Shelby County.

=== FM 2747 (1962) ===
Farm to Market Road 2747
- Location: Kent County
- Existed: May 2, 1962–June 10, 1965

FM 2747 was first designated on May 2, 1962, running from US 380, 11 miles (18 km) west of Clairemont, northward to a point at a distance of approximately 6.0 miles (9.7 km). The highway was cancelled on June 10, 1965, with the mileage being transferred to FM 1081.

== RM 2748 ==
Ranch to Market Road 2748
- Location: Real and Uvalde counties
- Length: 2.061 mi (3.317 km)
- Existed: May 7, 1974–present

Ranch to Market Road 2748 (RM 2748) is located in Real and Uvalde counties.

=== FM 2748 (1962) ===
Farm to Market Road 2748
- Location: Stonewall County
- Existed: May 2, 1962–May 22, 1964

FM 2748 was first designated on May 2, 1962, running from US 83, north of the Salt Fork Brazos River, southeast to a point at a distance of approximately 5.0 miles (8.0 km). The highway was extended 3.2 miles (5.1 km) to the Salt Fork Brazos River on June 28, 1963. FM 2748 was cancelled on May 22, 1964, with the mileage being transferred to FM 1263.

=== FM 2748 (1965) ===
Farm to Market Road 2748
- Location: Bell County
- Existed: June 1, 1965–January 31, 1974

FM 2748 was designated a second time on June 1, 1965, running from SH 317 in Belton to FM 439. The highway was cancelled on January 31, 1974, with the mileage being transferred to FM 93.

== FM 2749 ==
Farm to Market Road 2749
- Location: Limestone County
- Length: 9.707 mi (15.622 km)
- Existed: 1962–present

Farm to Market Road 2749 (FM 2749) is located in Limestone County.

== FM 2750 ==
Farm to Market Road 2750
- Location: Cherokee County
- Length: 2.791 mi (4.492 km)
- Existed: May 2, 1962–present

Farm to Market Road 2750 (FM 2750) is located in Cherokee County. It runs 2.8 miles (4.5 km) from an intersection with FM 2064 northwest of New Summerfield, east to an intersection with SH 110.

FM 2750 was designated on May 2, 1962, along the current route.

== FM 2751 ==
Farm to Market Road 2751
- Location: Gregg County
- Length: 3.42 mi (5.50 km)
- Existed: 1962–present

Farm to Market Road 2751 (FM 2751) is located in Gregg County, running from FM 1844 near Judson north to Brown Rd.

FM 2751 was designated in 1962 from proposed SH 26 (now US 259) north 3.6 miles (5.8 km). In 1977, FM 2751 was extended north to US 259, its current northern terminus.

Junction list

The entire route is in Gregg County.

Location	mi	km	Destinations	Notes
			FM 1844	
			US 259 – Ore City, Longview	
			FM 449	
			Brown Rd	
1.000 mi = 1.609 km; 1.000 km = 0.621 mi

== FM 2752 ==
Farm to Market Road 2752
- Location: Henderson County
- Length: 2.926 mi (4.709 km)
- Existed: 1962–present

Farm to Market Road 2752 (FM 2752) is located in Henderson County.

== FM 2753 ==
Farm to Market Road 2753
- Location: Rusk County
- Length: 2.556 mi (4.113 km)
- Existed: 1962–present

Farm to Market Road 2753 (FM 2753) is located in Rusk County.

== FM 2754 ==
Farm to Market Road 2754
- Location: Austin County
- Length: 8.262 mi (13.296 km)
- Existed: 1962–present

Farm to Market Road 2754 (FM 2754) is located in Austin County.

== FM 2755 ==
Farm to Market Road 2755
- Location: Collin County
- Length: 5.493 mi (8.840 km)
- Existed: 1962–present

Farm to Market Road 2755 (FM 2755) is located in Collin County. FM 2755 is located Southeast of the city of Lavon. FM 2755 starts at an intersection with Main Street and ends at an intersection with FM 1138.

== FM 2756 ==
Farm to Market Road 2756
- Location: Collin County
- Length: 4.912 mi (7.905 km)
- Existed: 1962–present

Farm to Market Road 2756 (FM 2756) is located in Collin County. FM 2756 is located between FM 1377 and State Highway 78. FM 2756 is located north of Farmersville and Princeton.

== FM 2757 ==
Farm to Market Road 2757
- Location: Kaufman County
- Length: 3.696 mi (5.948 km)
- Existed: 1962–present

Farm to Market Road 2757 (FM 2757) is located in Kaufman County.

FM 2757 begins at an intersection with FM 740 in Mesquite just south of I-20. The highway runs in a southeast direction through rural areas of the county, running just south of Soil Conservation Service Site Reservoir 11 before ending at an intersection with FM 741 southeast of the Heartland subdivision.

FM 2757 was designated on June 25, 1962, along the current route.

== RM 2758 ==
Ranch to Market Road 2758
- Location: Hemphill County
- Length: 14.892 mi (23.966 km)
- Existed: May 6, 1964–present

Ranch to Market Road 2758 (RM 2758) is located in Hemphill County.

=== FM 2758 ===
Farm to Market Road 2758
- Location: Fort Bend County
- Existed: May 2, 1962–July 30, 1963

A previous route numbered FM 2758 was designated on May 2, 1962, from SH 36 at Orchard north 2.5 miles (4.0 km) to a point 0.4 miles (0.64 km) south of the Brazos River. On July 30, 1963, FM 2758 was cancelled and transferred to FM 1489.

== FM 2759 ==
Farm to Market Road 2759
- Location: Fort Bend County
- Length: 9.256 mi (14.896 km)
- Existed: May 2, 1962–present

Farm to Market Road 2759 (FM 2759) is located in Fort Bend County. The highway begins at Interstate 69 (I-69)/U.S. Highway 59 (US 59), heads southwest to Farm to Market Road 762, turns southeast and ends in Thompsons.

FM 2759 starts as a four-lane road at the I-69/US 59 underpass and goes southwest for 1.8 miles (2.9 km). In this stretch, FM 2759 is also known as Crabb River Road. The highway is a continuation of SH 99 which heads northeast from I-69/US 59. Nearby communities include Greatwood, Tara and Canyongate at the Brazos. Businesses along Crabb River Road include a car dealership, a few petrol stations, and a number of stores and restaurants. There are traffic signals at Sansbury Boulevard and Tara Drive and bridges over Middle Bayou and Rabbs Bayou. FM 2759 turns sharply to the east-southeast at the traffic light controlled intersection with FM 762.

From this place to its terminus, FM 2759 runs parallel to the BNSF Railway tracks. For 1.0 mile (1.6 km) until it reaches Macek Road, the highway passes along the south side of the Tara subdivision. The William C. Velasquez Elementary School of the Lamar Consolidated Independent School District is 500 yards (457 m) north of the highway at Macek Road. After this point the landscape becomes rural. At Booth, the highway bends more to the southeast. The Riverpointe Golf Club is southeast of Booth on the north side. Just before Pittman Road, FM 2759 passes under electric transmission lines before curving slightly more to the southeast. As the highway approaches Thompsons, there is an oil well, tanks and a flare on the north side. Near Y. U. Jones Road, the highway bends so that it goes nearly east. After an additional 0.5 miles (0.8 km) FM 2759 intersects with Thompsons Oil Field Road, which goes south across the railroad tracks. The road continues east for another 0.5 miles (0.8 km) but only connects with minor roads beyond that point.

FM 2759 was originally designated on May 2, 1962, to go from FM 762 at Crabb to the southeast about 7.4 miles (11.9 km) to Thompsons. On September 5, 1973, the highway was extended an additional 1.7 miles (2.7 km) to the northeast from FM 762 to what is now I-69/US 59 and SH 99 intersection.

Junction list

The entire highway is in Fort Bend County.

Location	mi	km	Destinations	Notes
Greatwood			I-69 / US 59 / SH 99 (Frontage Road) – Houston, Victoria, Spring	I-69/US 59 exit 104; northern terminus
Crabb			FM 762	
Thompsons			Thompsons Oil Field Road	Southern terminus
1.000 mi = 1.609 km; 1.000 km = 0.621 mi

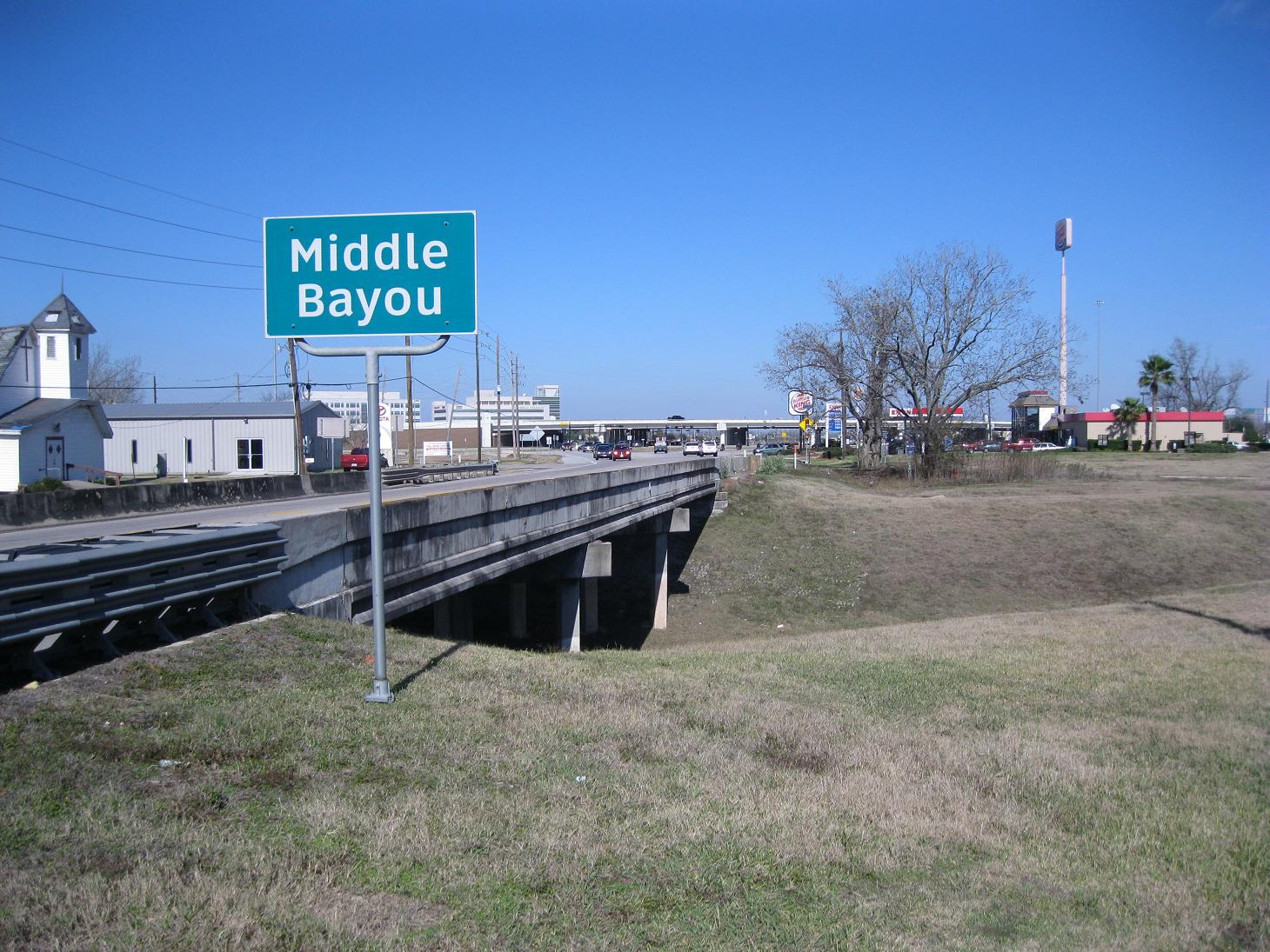
North end of FM 2759 near the I-69/US 59 overpass

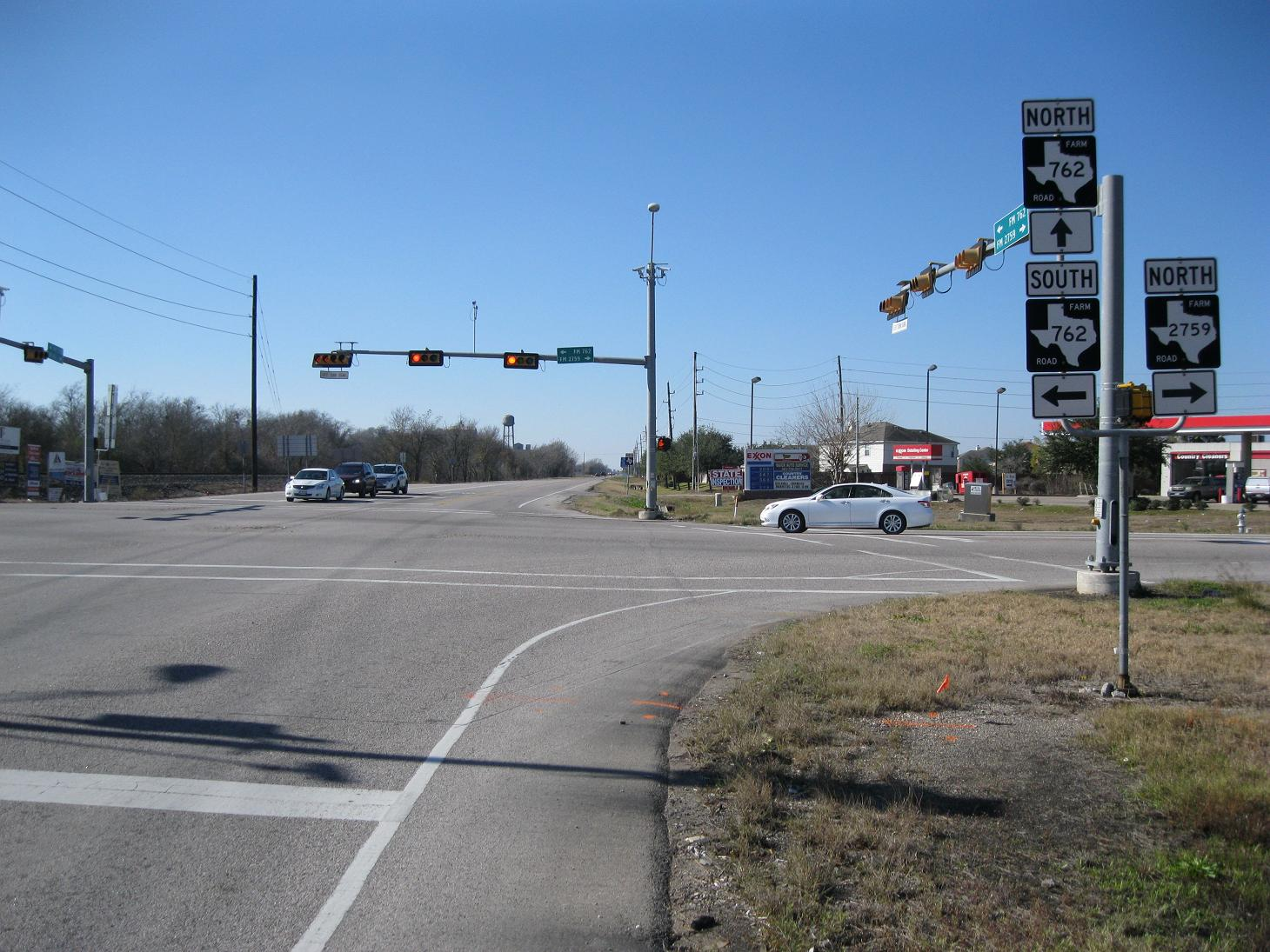
View northwest at FM 762 and Crabb River Rd

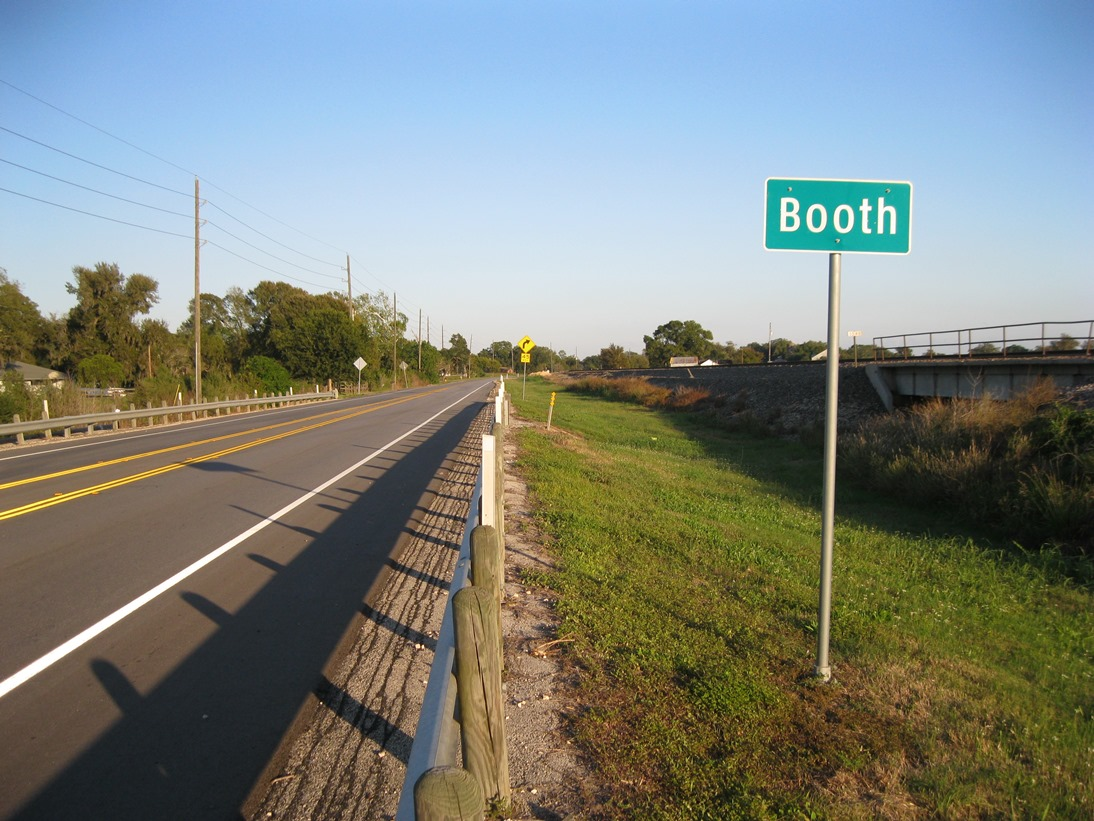
Looking southeast at Booth with BNSF Railway on right

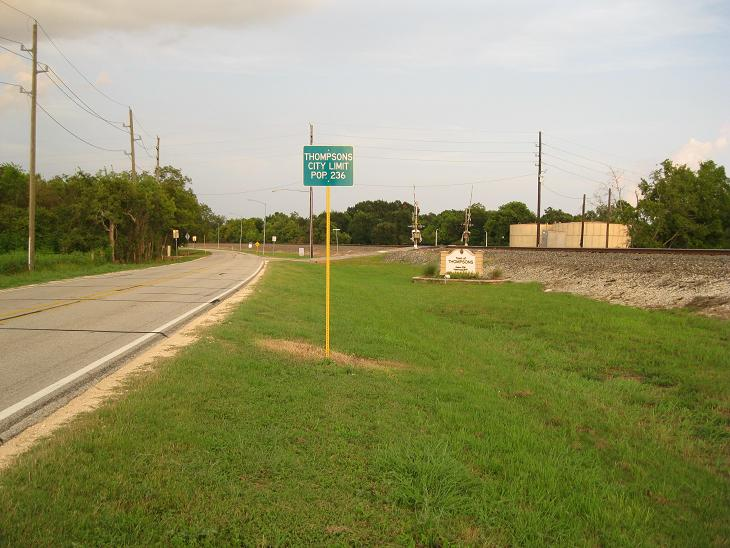
View east at Y. U. Jones Rd in Thompsons

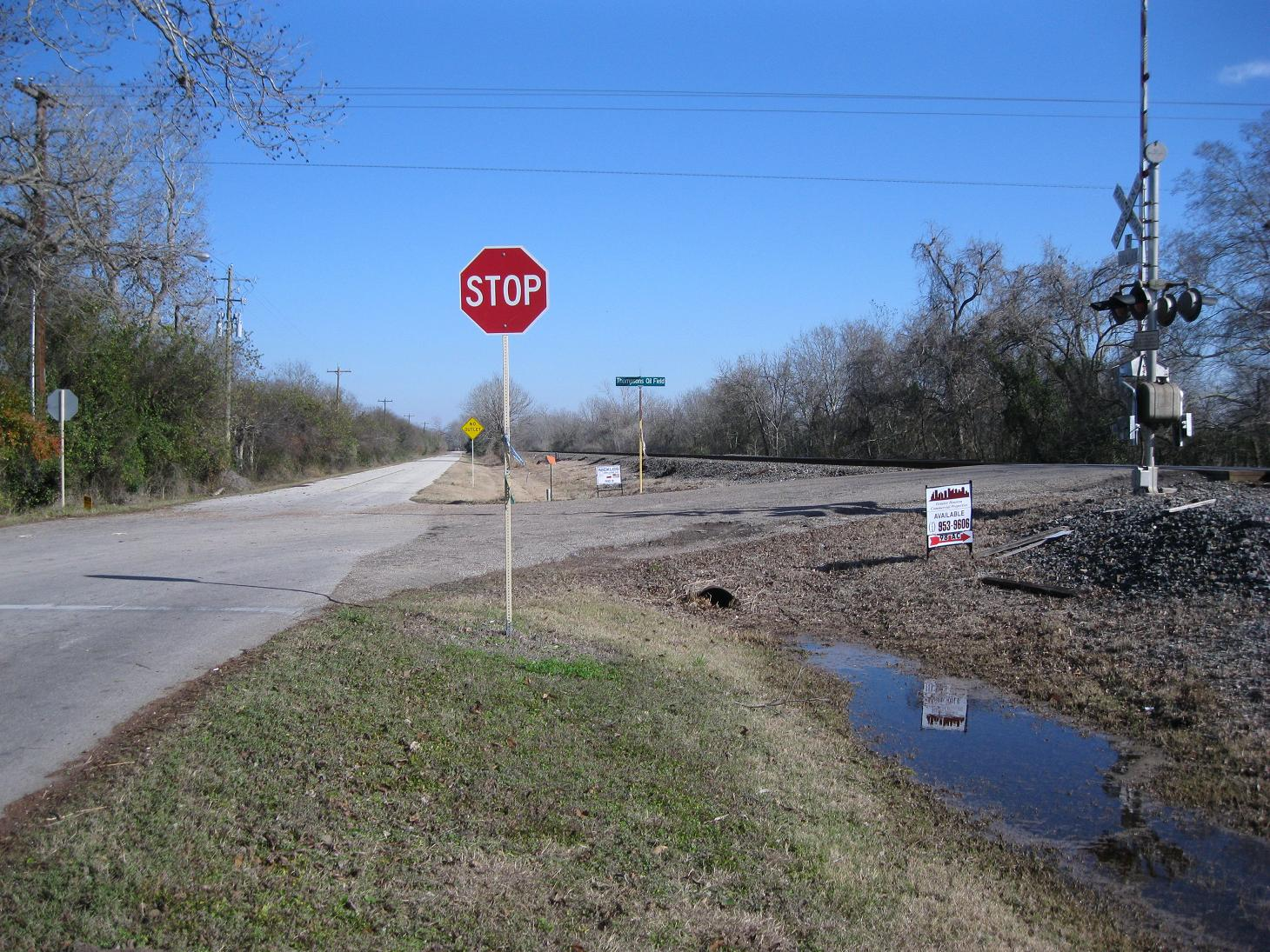
South end of FM 2759 at Thompsons Oil Field Rd

== FM 2760 ==
Farm to Market Road 2760
- Location: Calhoun County
- Length: 2.923 mi (4.704 km)
- Existed: 1962–present

Farm to Market Road 2760 (FM 2760) is located in Calhoun County.

== FM 2761 ==
Farm to Market Road 2761
- Location: Colorado County
- Length: 5.871 mi (9.448 km)
- Existed: 1962–present

Farm to Market Road 2761 (FM 2761) is located in Colorado County.

== FM 2762 ==
Farm to Market Road 2762
- Location: Fayette County
- Length: 8.558 mi (13.773 km)
- Existed: 1962–present

Farm to Market Road 2762 (FM 2762) is located in Fayette County.

== FM 2763 ==
Farm to Market Road 2763
- Location: Scurry County
- Length: 2.69 mi (4.33 km)
- Existed: July 9, 1970–present

Farm to Market Road 2763 (FM 2763) is located in Scurry County.

=== FM 2763 (1962) ===
Farm to Market Road 2763
- Location: Lavaca County
- Length: 6.9 mi (11.1 km)
- Existed: May 2, 1962–May 18, 1970

A previous route numbered FM 2763 was designated on May 2, 1962, from US 77, 1 mile (1.6 km) south of Hallettsville, southwest 5.3 miles (8.5 km) to Mont. On November 26, 1969, the road was extended southwest 1.8 miles (2.9 km) from Mont. On May 5, 1970, the road was extended southwest to FM 531. FM 2763 was cancelled on May 18, 1970, and became a portion of FM 318.

== FM 2764 ==
Farm to Market Road 2764
- Location: Wharton and Colorado counties
- Length: 4.406 mi (7.091 km)
- Existed: 1962–present

Farm to Market Road 2764 (FM 2764) is located in Wharton and Colorado counties. The two-lane highway begins at US 90 Alt. northwest of Lissie, heads northeast along the boundary line between Colorado and Wharton Counties and ends at FM 1093 in Chesterville.

A two-lane road along its full course, FM 2764 starts at a stop sign on US 90 Alt. at a distance 1.8 miles (2.9 km) northwest of Lissie. From this point, the highway crosses the Union Pacific Railroad and heads northeast along the Colorado–Wharton county line. The gravel road that goes southwest from the starting point is called County Line Road. FM 2764 runs 4.4 miles (7.1 km) through croplands until it crosses a disused railroad and ends at FM 1093. A short distance before its end, FM 2764 curves to the north into Colorado County and meets FM 1093 at a stop sign in the small community of Chesterville.

FM 2764 was designated on May 2, 1962, along the current route.

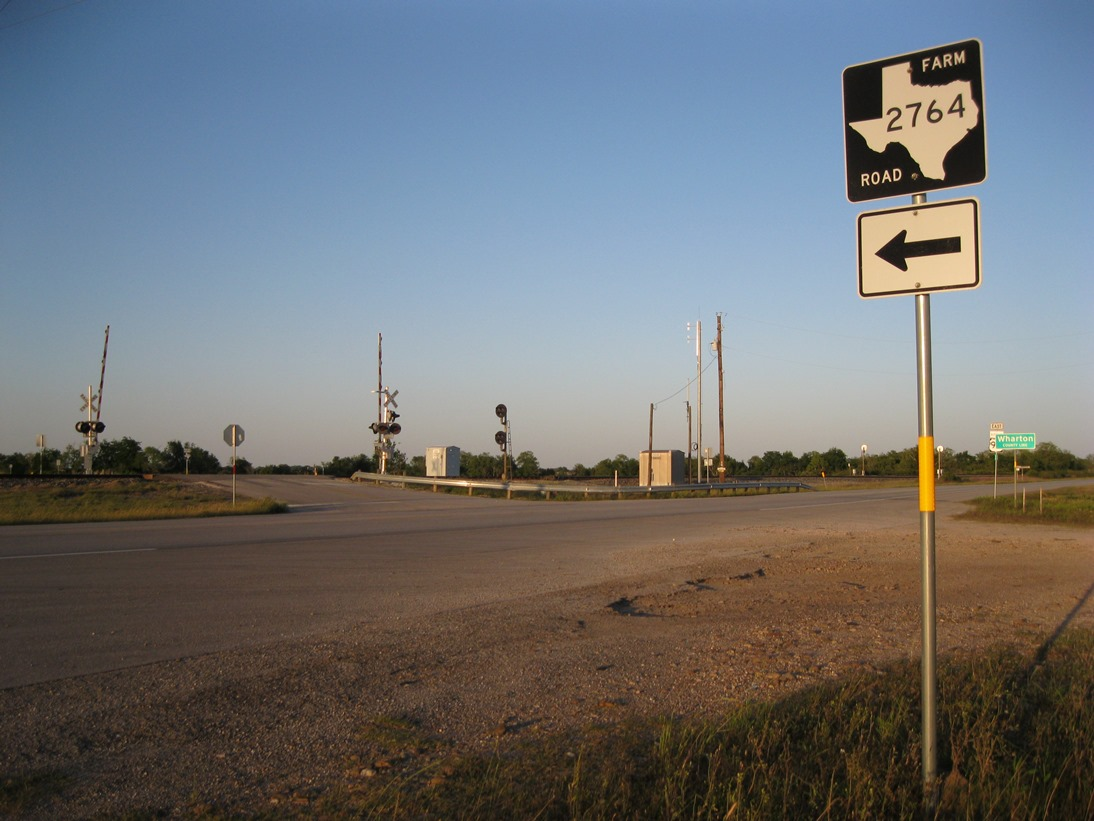
View northeast at junction of US 90 Alt. and FM 2764

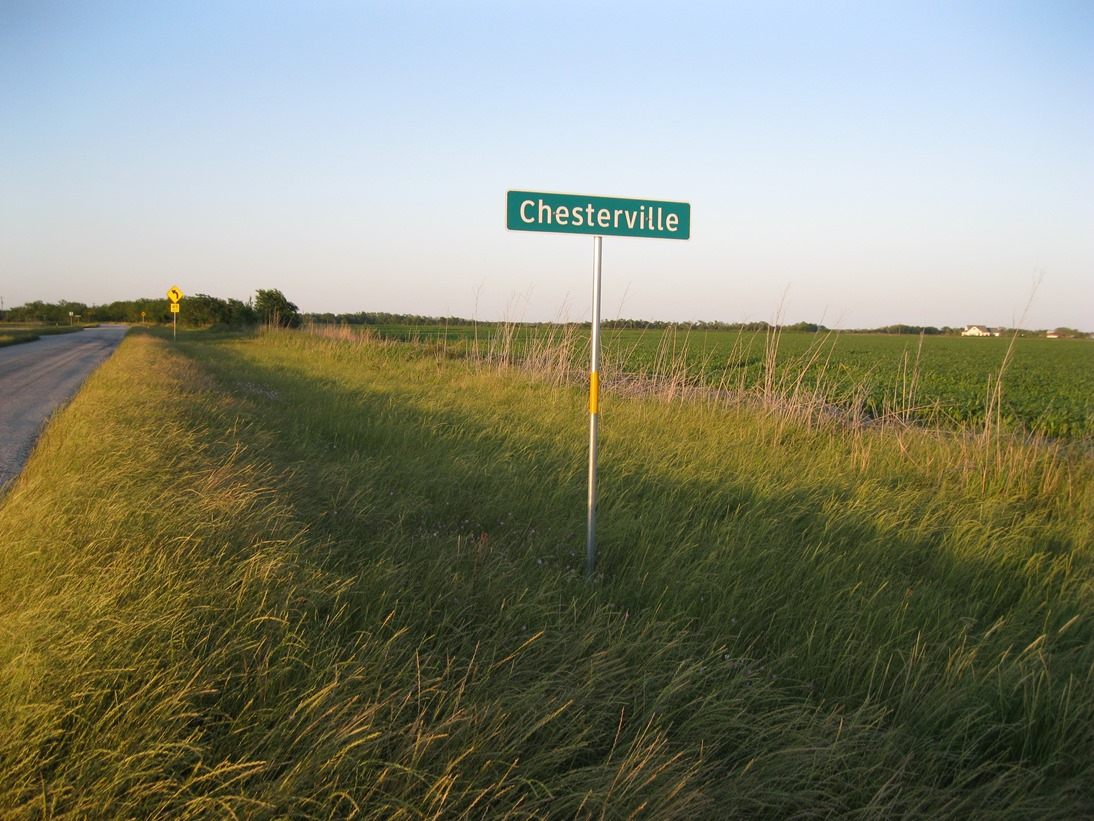
Chesterville sign on FM 2764 looking northeast

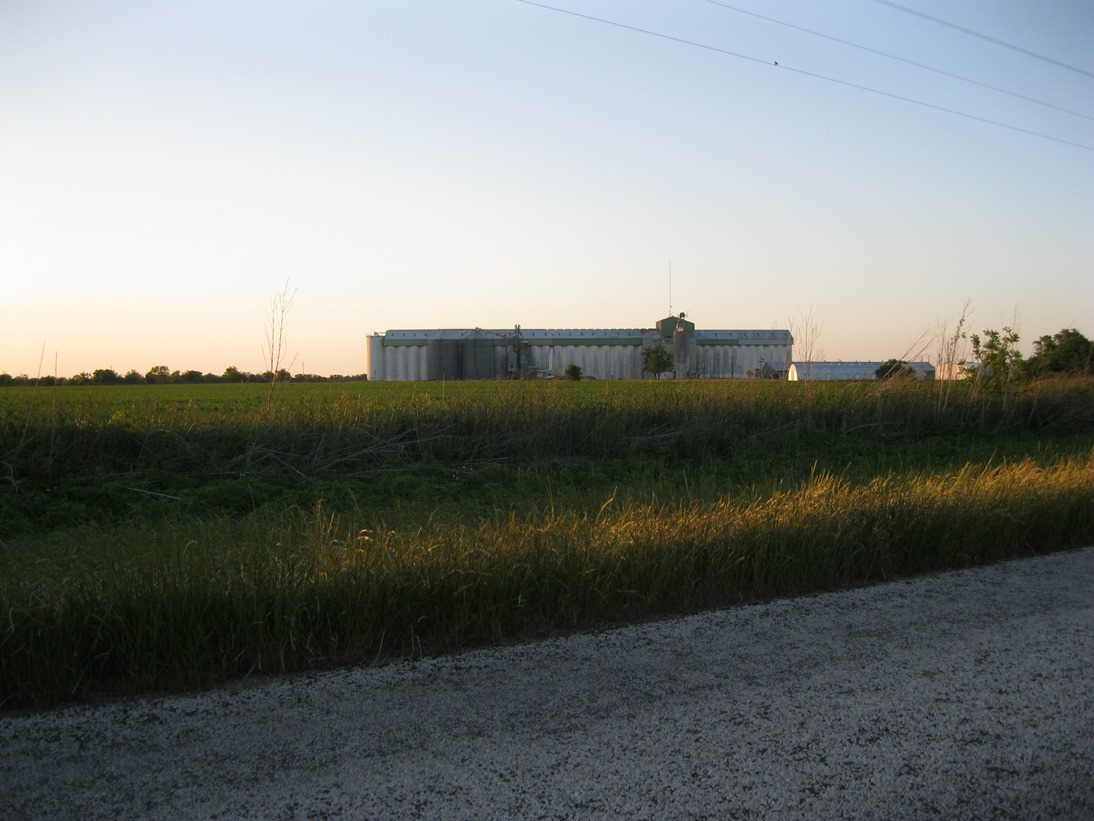
Grain storage unit in Chesterville from FM 2764

== FM 2765 ==
Farm to Market Road 2765
- Location: Wharton County
- Length: 6.83 mi (10.99 km)
- Existed: 1962–present

Farm to Market Road 2765 (FM 2765) is located in Wharton County.

== RM 2766 ==
Ranch to Market Road 2766
- Location: Blanco County
- Length: 9.194 mi (14.796 km)
- Existed: 1962–present

Ranch to Market Road 2766 (RM 2766) is located in Blanco County.

== FM 2767 ==
Farm to Market Road 2767
- Location: Smith and Gregg counties
- Length: 18.298 mi (29.448 km)
- Existed: December 20, 1963–present

Farm to Market Road 2767 (FM 2767), also known as Old Kilgore Highway, runs from Loop 323 in Tyler east to SH 31 near Kilgore.

The current route of FM 2767 was designated on December 20, 1963. On September 29, 2005, FM 2767 was rerouted to end at Loop 323 further north; the old route from FM 850 to the new route was obliterated, the old route from FM 850 to near Loop 323 was given to the county, and a small portion near Loop 323 was obliterated.

Junction list

County	Location	mi	km	Destinations	Notes
Smith	Tyler			Loop 323	
Smith				FM 850 east	
Smith				FM 2908	
Smith				FM 757	
Gregg				SH 31 – Tyler, Kilgore	
1.000 mi = 1.609 km; 1.000 km = 0.621 mi

=== RM 2767 ===
Ranch to Market Road 2767
- Location: Gillespie County
- Existed: May 2, 1962–July 10, 1963

A previous route numbered Ranch to Market Road 2767 (RM 2767) was designated in Gillespie County on May 2, 1962, from US 87 north of Fredericksburg northward 6.5 miles (10.5 km). RM 2767 was cancelled on July 10, 1963, and became part of RM 2323, which was extended.

== RM 2768 ==
Ranch to Market Road 2768
- Location: Llano County
- Length: 2.592 mi (4.171 km)
- Existed: 1962–present

Ranch to Market Road 2768 (RM 2768) is located in Llano County.

== RM 2769 ==
Ranch to Market Road 2769
- Location: Travis County
- Length: 7.151 mi (11.508 km)
- Existed: 1962–present

Ranch to Market Road 2769 (RM 2769) is a 7-mile (11 km) route in Travis County. A portion of RM 2769 carries the name Anderson Mill Road.

RM 2769 begins in Volente at an intersection with Lime Creek Road. It proceeds northeast to an intersection with Anderson Mill Road, along which it continues for one mile (1.6 km) before terminating at RM 620 near the Travis–Williamson county line.

RM 2769 was designated on May 2, 1962, with its current description.

RM 2769 originally ran continuously from Volente to its intersection with RM 620. In 2007, Anderson Mill Road was extended along the most easterly mile (1.6 km) of this right-of-way. RM 2769 now approaches from the southwest and continues onto Anderson Mill Road using a T-intersection.

County	Location	mi	km	Destinations	Notes
Travis	Volente	0.000	0.000	Lime Creek Road / Wharf Cove	Western terminus
Travis–Williamson county line	Austin–Cedar Park line	7.151	11.508	RM 620 – Round Rock	Eastern terminus; road continues as Anderson Mill Road
1.000 mi = 1.609 km; 1.000 km = 0.621 mi

== FM 2770 ==
Farm to Market Road 2770
- Location: Hays County
- Length: 6.126 mi (9.859 km)
- Existed: June 12, 1968–present

Farm to Market Road 2770 (FM 2770) is located in Hays County.

=== FM 2770 (1962) ===
Farm to Market Road 2770
- Location: Guadalupe County
- Existed: May 2, 1962–June 15, 1967

A previous route numbered FM 2770 was designated on May 2, 1962, from FM 466, 2.7 miles (4.3 km) east of FM 477, south 8.0 miles (12.9 km) to a point 3.5 miles (5.6 km) north of the Gonzales County line. On June 2, 1967, the road was extended to the Gonzales County line. FM 2770 was cancelled on June 15, 1967, and became a portion of FM 1117.

== FM 2771 ==
Farm to Market Road 2771
- Location: Kerr County
- Length: 6.281 mi (10.108 km)
- Existed: 1962–present

Farm to Market Road 2771 (FM 2771) is located in Kerr County. The highway is known locally as Lower Turtle Creek Road.

FM 2771 begins at an intersection with SH 16 southwest of Kerrville. The highway runs parallel to Turtle Creek and crosses the creek twice before turning north and ending at an intersection with SH 173 southeast of Kerrville. FM 2771 is a two-lane road with a speed limit of 55 MPH for its entire length.

FM 2771 was designated on May 2, 1962, along the current route.

== FM 2772 ==
Farm to Market Road 2772
- Location: Wilson County
- Length: 1.976 mi (3.180 km)
- Existed: 1962–present

Farm to Market Road 2772 (FM 2772) is located in Wilson County.

== FM 2773 ==
Farm to Market Road 2773
- Location: Karnes County
- Length: 2.768 mi (4.455 km)
- Existed: 1962–present

Farm to Market Road 2773 (FM 2773) is located in Karnes County.

== FM 2774 ==
Farm to Market Road 2774
- Location: Burleson County
- Length: 1.464 mi (2.356 km)
- Existed: 1962–present

Farm to Market Road 2774 (FM 2774) is located in Burleson County.

== RM 2775 ==
Ranch to Market Road 2775
- Location: El Paso County
- Length: 5.481 mi (8.821 km)
- Existed: June 2, 1967–present

Ranch to Market Road 2775 (RM 2775) is located in El Paso County. The highway is known locally as Hueco Tanks Road.

RM 2775 begins in western Butterfield northeast of El Paso at Montana Avenue which carries US 62 and US 180 in northeastern El Paso County. The 5.5-mile (8.9 km) route encounters gentle grades running through a valley in the western Hueco Mountains east of Fort Bliss, past the Hueco Tanks rock formation to Hueco Tanks State Historic Site, a state park maintained by the Texas Parks and Wildlife Department. The road becomes PR 68 upon entering the park. Along its length, the road intersects only local streets and private roads.

RM 2775 was designated on June 2, 1967, along the current route. On February 21, 1974, the continuation of the road within the state park, previously without designation, was named Park Road 68.

=== FM 2775 (1962) ===
Farm to Market Road 2775
- Location: Kleberg County
- Existed: May 2, 1962–May 18, 1966

A previous route numbered FM 2775 was designated on May 2, 1962, running from FM 628 (now RM 628) west of Loyola Beach to a point approximately 3.0 miles (4.8 km) to the northwest. The highway was cancelled on May 18, 1966, with the mileage being transferred to FM 772.

== FM 2776 ==
Farm to Market Road 2776
- Location: Brazos County
- Length: 5.053 mi (8.132 km)
- Existed: 1962–present

Farm to Market Road 2776 (FM 2776) is located in Brazos County. It runs from FM 974, 0.9 miles (1.4 km) northeast of Tabor, southeastward to SH 21 and US 190 in Wixon Valley.

FM 2776 was designated in 1962 along its current route.

== FM 2777 ==
Farm to Market Road 2777
- Location: Freestone County
- Length: 2.581 mi (4.154 km)
- Existed: 1962–present

Farm to Market Road 2777 (FM 2777) is located in Freestone County.

== FM 2778 ==
Farm to Market Road 2778
- Location: Walker County
- Existed: May 2, 1962–December 21, 1990

Farm to Market Road 2778 (FM 2778) was located in Walker County. No highway currently uses the FM 2778 designation.

FM 2778 was designated on May 2, 1962, from SH 150 northeastward a distance of 4.9 miles (7.9 km). FM 2778 was cancelled on December 21, 1990, and became a portion of FM 2693. FM 2778 was not cancelled until the road connecting FM 2693's previous end 0.8 miles (1.3 km) to FM 2778 was complete.

== FM 2779 ==
Farm to Market Road 2779
- Location: Frio County
- Length: 13.536 mi (21.784 km)
- Existed: 1962–present

Farm to Market Road 2779 (FM 2779) is located in Frio County.

=== FM 2779 (1962) ===
Farm to Market Road 2779
- Location: Milam County
- Existed: May 2, 1962–June 25, 1962

The original FM 2779 was designated on May 2, 1962, to run from FM 2268 near Val Verde to Davilla. This route was cancelled on June 25, 1962 in exchange for extending FM 437 to Davilla.

== FM 2780 ==
Farm to Market Road 2780
- Location: Washington County
- Length: 8.981 mi (14.454 km)
- Existed: 1962–present

Farm to Market Road 2780 (FM 2780) is located in Washington County.

== FM 2781 ==
Farm to Market Road 2781
- Location: Houston and Trinity counties
- Length: 20.368 mi (32.779 km)
- Existed: 1962–present

Farm to Market Road 2781 (FM 2781) is located in Houston and Trinity counties.

== FM 2782 ==
Farm to Market Road 2782
- Location: Nacogdoches County
- Length: 9.031 mi (14.534 km)
- Existed: 1962–present

Farm to Market Road 2782 (FM 2782) is located in Nacogdoches County.

== FM 2783 ==
Farm to Market Road 2783
- Location: Nacogdoches County
- Length: 3.698 mi (5.951 km)
- Existed: 1962–present

Farm to Market Road 2783 (FM 2783) is located in Nacogdoches County.

== FM 2784 ==
Farm to Market Road 2784
- Location: Sabine County
- Length: 3.788 mi (6.096 km)
- Existed: 1962–present

Farm to Market Road 2784 (FM 2784) is located in Sabine County.

== FM 2785 ==
Farm to Market Road 2785
- Location: San Augustine County
- Length: 1.44 mi (2.32 km)
- Existed: 1962–present

Farm to Market Road 2785 (FM 2785) is located in San Augustine County.

== FM 2786 ==
Farm to Market Road 2786
- Location: Collin County
- Length: 1.943 mi (3.127 km)
- Existed: May 25, 1976–present

Farm to Market Road 2786 (FM 2786) is located in Collin County. The highway is locally known as Stacy Road.

FM 2786 begins at junction with SH 5 in Allen. FM 2786 enters into Fairview and ends at an intersection with FM 1378.

The current FM 2786 was designated on May 25, 1976, running from US 75 eastward to FM 1378. On June 27, 1995, the entire route was redesignated Urban Road 2786 (UR 2786). On July 26, 2007, the section from US 75 to SH 5 was cancelled and removed from the state highway system. The designation of the remaining section reverted to FM 2786 with the elimination of the Urban Road system on November 15, 2018.

=== FM 2786 (1962) ===
Farm to Market Road 2786
- Location: San Augustine County
- Existed: May 2, 1962–June 20, 1967

The first route numbered FM 2786 was designated on May 2, 1962, running from SH 103 to a road intersection at a distance of approximately 1.2 miles (1.9 km). The highway was decommissioned on June 20, 1967, with the mileage being transferred to FM 1992.

=== FM 2786 (1967) ===
Farm to Market Road 2786
- Location: Bell County
- Existed: October 25, 1967–December 29, 1975

The second route numbered FM 2786 was designated on October 25, 1967, running from FM 1670 to Stillhouse Hollow Lake at a distance of approximately 5.0 miles (8.0 km) as a redesignation of the old route of FM 1670. The highway's western terminus was moved 0.46 miles (0.74 km) on October 1, 1968. FM 2786 was cancelled on December 29, 1975, with the mileage being transferred to FM 2484.

== FM 2787 ==
Farm to Market Road 2787
- Location: Shelby County
- Length: 3.873 mi (6.233 km)
- Existed: 1962–present

Farm to Market Road 2787 (FM 2787) is located in Shelby County.

== FM 2788 ==
Farm to Market Road 2788
- Location: Shelby County
- Length: 1.281 mi (2.062 km)
- Existed: 1962–present

Farm to Market Road 2788 (FM 2788) is located in Shelby County.

== FM 2789 ==
Farm to Market Road 2789
- Location: Bowie County
- Length: 2.221 mi (3.574 km)
- Existed: 1962–present

Farm to Market Road 2789 (FM 2789) is located in Bowie County.

== FM 2790 ==
Farm to Market Road 2790
- Location: Medina, Atascosa, and Bexar counties
- Length: 21.378 mi (Note: The certified length given is shorter than the actual mileage as the Texas Department of Transportation description of FM 2790 considers to be discontinuous at rather than concurrent with SH 132 in Lytle.) (34.405 km)
- Existed: August 23, 1973–present

Farm to Market Road 2790 (FM 2790) runs from FM 471 in LaCoste to I-410 in southwestern San Antonio.

FM 2790 begins at an intersection with FM 471 in LaCoste and runs along the southern half of Castro Avenue through the city. The highway runs in a southern direction before entering the city of Lytle and has an overlap with SH 132. FM 2790 meets I-35 before leaving the city and turns to the east. The highway enters Somerset and runs along Dixon Street before turning northeast onto Somerset Road. FM 2790 intersects with Loop 1604 before leaving the city. The highway enters the city limits of San Antonio and crosses over the Medina River. FM 2790 continues to run in a northeast direction through the southwestern part of the city before ending at I-410/SH 16/SH 130.

The current FM 2790 was designated on August 23, 1973, running from FM 471 in LaCoste to a point at US 81 (now SH 132) in Lytle, then from another point at US 81 to FM 1604 (now Loop 1604) in Somerset as a renumbering of a portion of FM 1518. On June 21, 1977, the eastern terminus of the highway was moved when FM 1604 was re-rerouted through Somerset. The highway was extended 1.6 miles (2.6 km) northeast past Loop 1604. The highway was extended further northeastward to the Medina River on May 27, 1987. The last change came on November 11, 1987, when FM 2790 was extended to I-410 in San Antonio.

Junction list

County	Location	mi	km	Destinations	Notes
Medina	LaCoste	0.0	0.0	FM 471 – Natalia, Castroville	
Atascosa	Lytle	5.8	9.3	SH 132 south (Main Street) – Devine	West end of SH 132 overlap
Atascosa	Lytle	6.5	10.5	SH 132 north (Main Street) – San Antonio	East end of SH 132 overlap
Atascosa	Lytle	6.9	11.1	I-35 – San Antonio, Natalia	I-35 exit 131
Bexar		13.4	21.6	FM 476 south – Poteet	
Bexar	Somerset	15.5	24.9	Loop 1604 (Anderson Loop)	
Bexar	San Antonio	22.5	36.2	I-410 / SH 16 / SH 130	I-410 exit 51
1.000 mi = 1.609 km; 1.000 km = 0.621 mi: Concurrency terminus

=== FM 2790 (1962) ===
Farm to Market Road 2790
- Location: Bowie County
- Existed: May 2, 1962–May 18, 1970

FM 2790 was first designated on May 2, 1962, running from SH 26 (now US 259) west of DeKalb westward 5.1 miles (8.2 km) to a county road. This highway was cancelled on May 18, 1970, with the mileage being transferred to FM 1701.

== FM 2791 ==
Farm to Market Road 2791
- Location: Cass County
- Length: 10.19 mi (16.40 km)
- Existed: 1962–present

Farm to Market Road 2791 (FM 2791) is located in Cass County.

== FM 2792 ==
Farm to Market Road 2792
- Location: Panola County
- Length: 1.367 mi (2.200 km)
- Existed: November 24, 1970–present

Farm to Market Road 2792 (FM 2792) is located in Panola County. It runs from US 59 northeast to FM 1794.

FM 2792 was designated on November 24, 1970, on its current route.

=== FM 2792 (1962) ===
Farm to Market Road 2792
- Location: Panola County
- Existed: May 2, 1962–November 24, 1970

A previous route numbered FM 2792 was designated on May 2, 1962, from FM 31 in DeBerry west and south 4.7 miles (7.6 km) to FM 1186. FM 2792 was cancelled on November 24, 1970, and became a portion of FM 1794; FM 2792 was reassigned to the old route of US 59.

== FM 2793 ==
Farm to Market Road 2793
- Location: Walker County
- Length: 1.514 mi (2.437 km)
- Existed: 1972–present

Farm to Market Road 2793 (FM 2793) is located in Walker County.

=== FM 2793 (1962) ===
Farm to Market Road 2793
- Location: Upshur County
- Existed: May 2, 1962–August 3, 1971

FM 2793 was first designated on May 2, 1962, from SH 154 southward through Kelsey to FM 554. This was cancelled on August 3, 1971, and mileage was transferred to FM 1795.

== FM 2794 ==
Farm to Market Road 2794
- Location: Crosby and Dickens counties
- Length: 21.112 mi (33.976 km)
- Existed: 1962–present

Farm to Market Road 2794 (FM 2794) is located in Crosby and Dickens counties.

=== FM 2794 (1962) ===
Farm to Market Road 2794
- Location: Chambers County
- Existed: May 2, 1962–August 1962

The original FM 2794 was designated on May 2, 1962, from FM 47 west 4.8 miles (7.7 km) to FM 751. This route was cancelled 90 days later.

== FM 2795 ==
Farm to Market Road 2795
- Location: Rains County
- Length: 10.848 mi (17.458 km)
- Existed: 1962–present

Farm to Market Road 2795 (FM 2795) is located in Rains County.

=== FM 2795 (1962) ===
Farm to Market Road 2795
- Location: Chambers County
- Existed: May 2, 1962–August 27, 1962

The original FM 2795 was designated on May 2, 1962, from FM 564 (now decommissioned) 3.0 miles (4.8 km) south of SH 61 to FM 562. This route was cancelled, along with the 0.9 miles (1.4 km) extension of FM 562 south of Smith Point, on August 29, 1962 in exchange for extending FM 2354.

== FM 2796 ==
Farm to Market Road 2796
- Location: Upshur County
- Length: 10.026 mi (16.135 km)
- Existed: 1962–present

Farm to Market Road 2796 (FM 2796) is located in Upshur County.

== FM 2797 ==
Farm to Market Road 2797
- Location: Liberty County
- Length: 2.42 mi (3.89 km)
- Existed: 1962–present

Farm to Market Road 2797 (FM 2797) is located in Liberty County.

== FM 2798 ==
Farm to Market Road 2798
- Location: Hardin and Polk counties
- Length: 10.851 mi (17.463 km)
- Existed: 1962–present

Farm to Market Road 2798 (FM 2798) is located in Hardin and Polk counties.

== FM 2799 ==
Farm to Market Road 2799
- Location: Jasper County
- Length: 8.35 mi (13.44 km)
- Existed: 1962–present

Farm to Market Road 2799 (FM 2799) is located in Jasper County.
