= List of highways numbered 68 =

The following highways are numbered 68:

== Australia ==
- Channel Highway (Tasmania)
- NSW (Multiple routes)

== Canada ==
- Alberta Highway 68
- Manitoba Highway 68
- Ontario Highway 68

== Chile ==
- Chile Route 68

== Greece ==
- EO68 road

== India ==
- National Highway 68 (India)

== Korea, South ==
- Gukjido 68

== Philippines ==
- N68 highway (Philippines)

== Poland ==
- National road 68

== United States ==
- Interstate 68
  - Interstate 68 (Maryland 1975) (former proposal)
- U.S. Route 68
- Alabama State Route 68
  - County Route 68 (Lee County, Alabama)
- Arizona State Route 68
- Arkansas Highway 68 (former)
- California State Route 68
- Colorado State Highway 68 (former)
- Connecticut Route 68
- Florida State Road 68
  - County Road 68 (Okeechobee County, Florida)
  - County Road 68 (St. Lucie County, Florida)
- Georgia State Route 68
  - Georgia State Route 68 (1921–1932) (former)
- Illinois Route 68
- Indiana State Road 68
- Iowa Highway 68 (former)
- K-68 (Kansas highway)
- Louisiana Highway 68
  - Louisiana State Route 68 (former)
- Maryland Route 68
- Massachusetts Route 68
- M-68 (Michigan highway)
- Minnesota State Highway 68
  - County Road 68 (Ramsey County, Minnesota)
- Missouri Route 68
  - Missouri Route 68 (1922) (former)
- Nebraska Highway 68
- Nevada State Route 68 (former)
- New Jersey Route 68
  - County Route 68 (Bergen County, New Jersey)
- New Mexico State Road 68
- New York State Route 68
  - County Route 68 (Chautauqua County, New York)
  - County Route 68 (Dutchess County, New York)
  - County Route 68 (Erie County, New York)
  - County Route 68 (Herkimer County, New York)
  - County Route 68 (Oneida County, New York)
  - County Route 68 (Putnam County, New York)
  - County Route 68 (Rensselaer County, New York)
  - County Route 68 (Rockland County, New York)
  - County Route 68 (Steuben County, New York)
  - County Route 68 (Suffolk County, New York)
  - County Route 68 (Westchester County, New York)
- North Carolina Highway 68
- North Dakota Highway 68
- Ohio State Route 68 (1923) (former)
- Pennsylvania Route 68
- South Carolina Highway 68
- Tennessee State Route 68
- Texas State Highway 68 (proposed)
  - Texas State Highway 68 (pre-1942) (former)
  - Texas State Highway Loop 68 (former)
  - Texas State Highway Spur 68 (former)
  - Farm to Market Road 68
  - Texas Park Road 68
- Utah State Route 68
- Vermont Route 68 (former)
- Virginia State Route 68
- West Virginia Route 68
- Wisconsin Highway 68

Territories

- U.S. Virgin Islands Highway 68

== See also ==
- A68 (disambiguation)

Preceded by 67	Lists of highways 68	Succeeded by 69
