= First Baptist Church (Stamford, Texas) =

Historic church in Texas, United States

- U.S. National Register of Historic Places
- Recorded Texas Historic Landmark
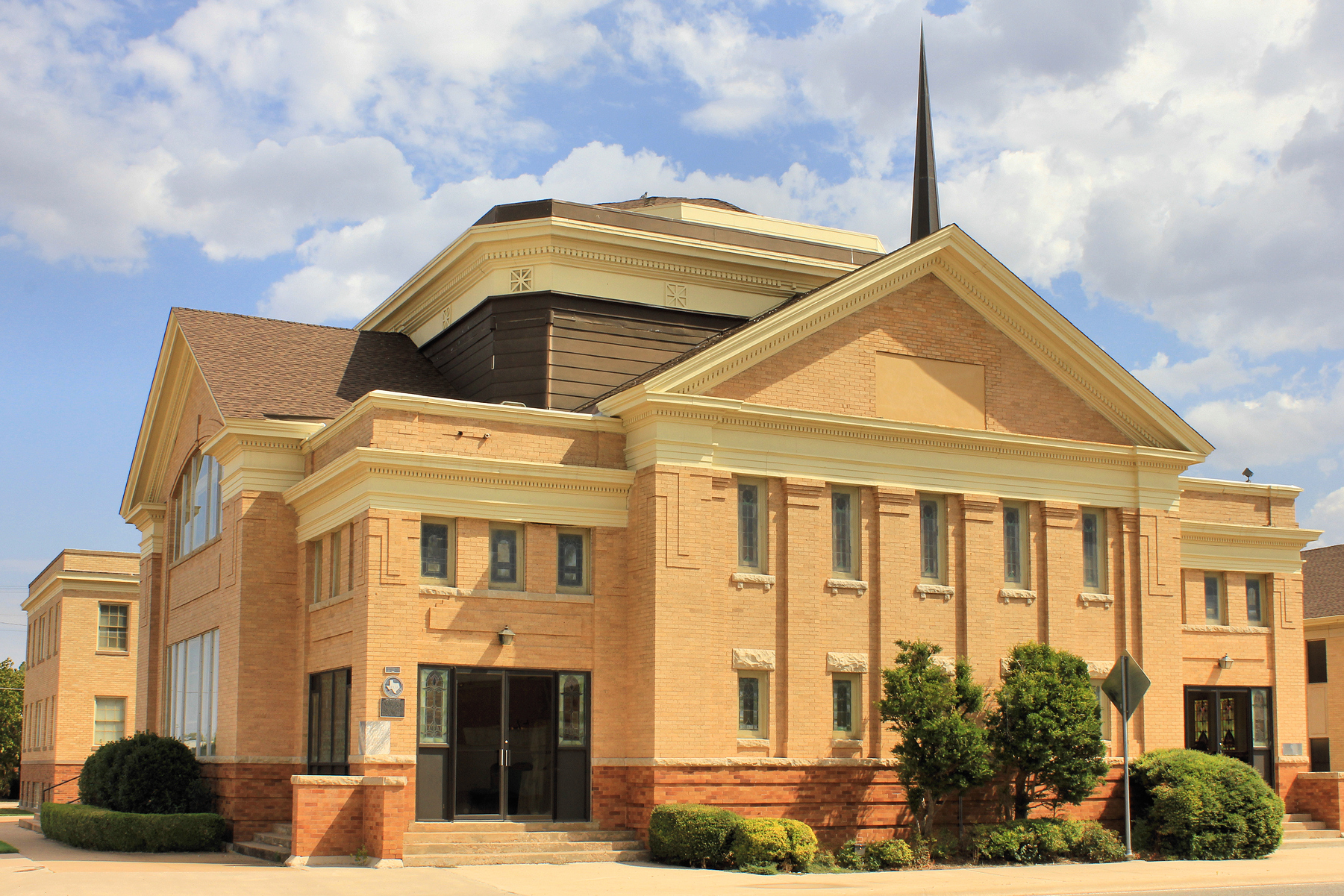
- First Baptist Church

- Location within Texas Location within the United States
- Location: E. Oliver and N. Swenson, Stamford, Texas
- Coordinates: 32°56′50″N 99°48′8″W
- Area: less than one acre
- Built: 1908
- Architectural style: Colonial Revival
- MPS: Stamford MRA
- NRHP reference No.: 86002359
- RTHL No.: 15310

Significant dates
- Added to NRHP: September 24, 1986
- Designated RTHL: 1989

First Baptist Church is a Baptist church at E. Oliver and N. Swenson in Stamford, Texas. It is affiliated with the Southern Baptist Convention. Built in 1908, the church is a large, domed structure built on a Greek Cross form and covered with buff-colored brick. It was listed on the National Register of Historic Places on September 24, 1986, and designated a Recorded Texas Historic Landmark in 1989. A two-story educational building was added in 1932 and another educational wing in 1960.

The First Baptist Church was organized in Stamford in early 1900. Frank Shelby Groner became pastor in 1905. He increased the membership from 147 to about 750 and that made a new and larger church necessary. After using temporary facilities for seven years, the congregation had grown and prospered enough to initiate a new structure. Ten leading members of the church each pledged $1,000 for construction, and the new church stood as one of the city's most elaborate and expensive structures.

== See also ==
- National Register of Historic Places listings in Jones County, Texas
- Recorded Texas Historic Landmarks in Jones County
