= KJTZ =

KJTZ may refer to:

- KJTZ-LP, a low-power radio station (96.1 FM) licensed to serve Alameda, California, United States
- KLGD, a radio station (106.9 FM) licensed to serve Stamford, Texas, United States, which held the call sign KJTZ from 2004 to 2011
