= Saint John's Methodist Church (Texas) =

Historic church in Texas, United States

- U.S. National Register of Historic Places
- Recorded Texas Historic Landmark
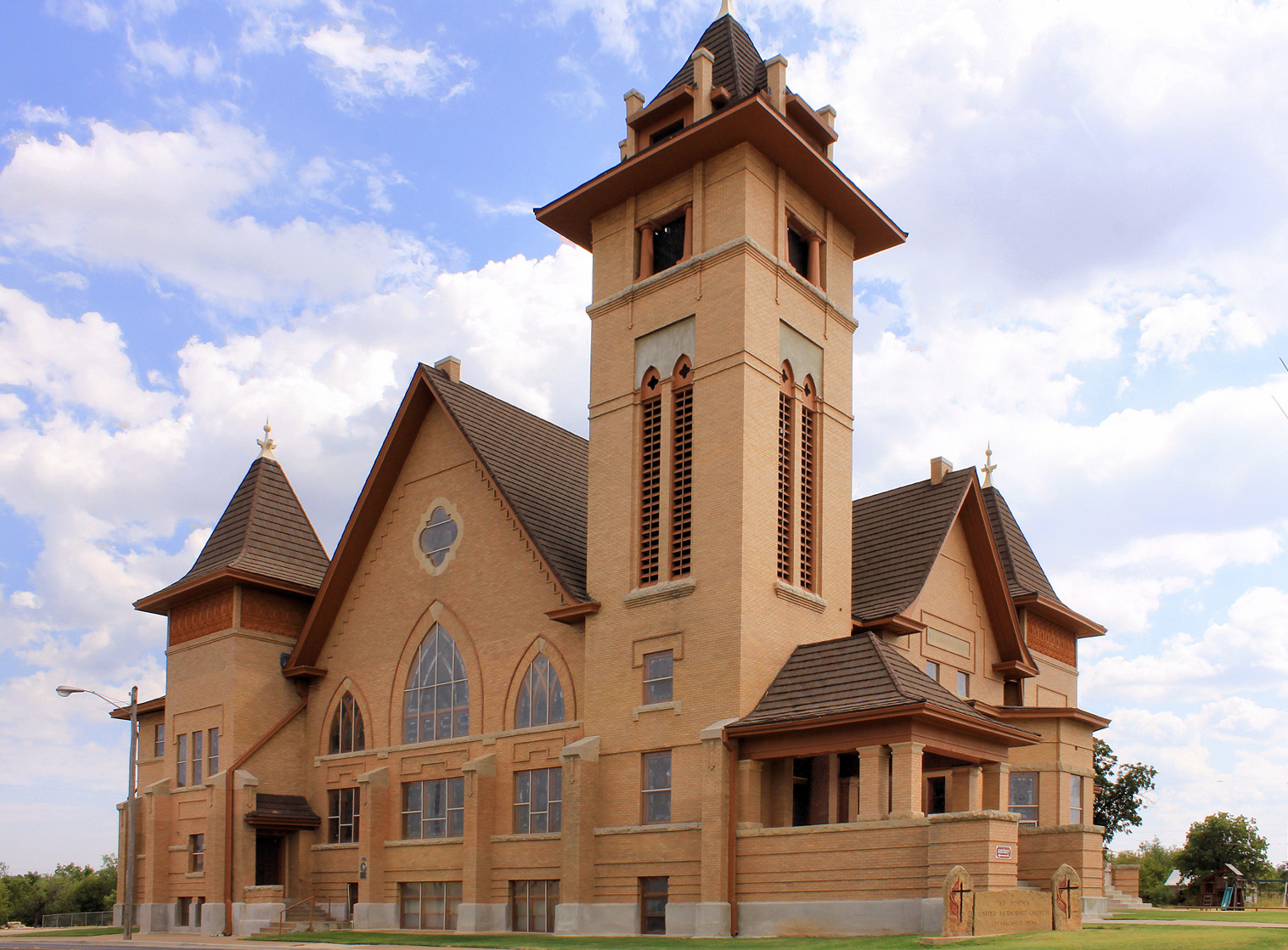
- Saint John's Methodist Church

- Location within Texas Location within the United States
- Location: S. Ferguson St., Stamford, Texas
- Coordinates: 32°56′38″N 99°47′59″W
- Area: less than one acre
- Built: 1910
- Architect: James E. Flanders, Et al.
- Architectural style: Prairie School
- MPS: Stamford MRA
- NRHP reference No.: 86002351
- RTHL No.: 5046

Significant dates
- Added to NRHP: September 24, 1986
- Designated RTHL: 1964

Saint John's Methodist Church is a historic church at S. Ferguson Street in Stamford, Texas.

It was built in 1910 and added to the National Register in 1986.

== See also ==
- National Register of Historic Places listings in Jones County, Texas
- Recorded Texas Historic Landmarks in Jones County
