= List of Carnegie libraries in Texas =

The following list of Carnegie libraries in Texas provides detailed information on United States Carnegie libraries in Texas, where 32 public libraries were built from 30 grants (totaling $649,500) awarded by the Carnegie Corporation of New York from 1898 to 1915. In addition, an academic library was built at Wiley University in Marshall from a $15,000 grant awarded March 26, 1906.

Today 13 of these buildings survive, with 10 listed on the National Register of Historic Places. They were often designed by the leading Texas architects of the day. For example, the now-demolished main libraries in Dallas, Houston, and San Antonio were works by James Riely Gordon, the master architect of county courthouses.

== Key ==
Building still operating as a library
Building standing, but now serving another purpose
Building no longer standing
Building listed on the National Register of Historic Places

== Public libraries ==
| | Library | City or town | Image | Date granted | Grant amount | Location | Notes |
|---|---|---|---|---|---|---|---|
| 1 | Abilene | Abilene | | Mar 9, 1907 | $17,500 | | Building demolished in 1958 |
| 2 | Ballinger | Ballinger | | Feb 10, 1908 | $17,500 | 204 N 8th St | Still a public library |
| 3 | Belton | Belton | | Feb 2, 1903 | $10,000 | 201 N Main St | Now the Bell County Museum |
| 4 | Brownwood | Brownwood | | Mar 27, 1903 | $15,000 | | Building demolished in 1965 |
| 5 | Bryan | Bryan | | Apr 11, 1902 | $10,000 | 111 S Main St | Now the Carnegie History Center |
| 6 | Clarksville | Clarksville | | Sep 5, 1902 | $10,000 | | Building destroyed by fire in 1980 |
| 7 | Cleburne | Cleburne | | Apr 13, 1903 | $20,000 | 201 N Caddo St | Now the Layland Museum |
| 8 | Corsicana | Corsicana | | Mar 16, 1904 | $25,000 | | Building demolished in 1967 |
| 9 | Dallas Main | Dallas | | Aug 23, 1899 | $76,000 | Commerce & Harwood Streets | Building demolished in 1954 |
| 10 | Dallas Branch | Dallas | | Aug 23, 1899 | — | | Building demolished |
| 11 | El Paso | El Paso | | Jan 9, 1902 | $37,500 | | Building demolished in 1968 |
| 12 | Fort Worth | Fort Worth | | Jun 30, 1899 | $50,000 | W 9th St and Throckmorton St | Building demolished in 1937 |
| 13 | Franklin | Franklin | | Apr 2, 1913 | $7,500 | 315 E Decherd | Now the Robertson County Public Library |
| 14 | Gainesville | Gainesville | | Apr 3, 1912 | $15,000 | 201 S Denton St | Now the Butterfield Stage |
| 15 | Greenville | Greenville | | Apr 13, 1903 | $15,000 | | Building demolished in 1953 |
| 16 | Houston Main | Houston | | Oct 28, 1899 | $65,000 | | Building demolished |
| 17 | Houston Segregated | Houston | | Oct 28, 1899 | $15,000 | Frederick St. and Robin St. (later replatted, the area is now Two Allen Center) | Building demolished in 1970s |
| 18 | Jefferson | Jefferson | | May 15, 1906 | $10,000 | 301 W Lafayette | Still the Jefferson Carnegie Library |
| 19 | Memphis | Memphis | | Jan 27, 1912 | $10,000 | | Building demolished in mid-1980s |
| 20 | Palestine | Palestine | | Sep 27, 1912 | $15,000 | 502 N Queen St | Resumed service as the Palestine Public Library in June 2023 |
| 21 | Pecos | Pecos | | Jun 25, 1911 | $9,000 | | Building demolished in early 1960s |
| 22 | Pittsburg | Pittsburg | | Apr 30, 1898 | $5,000 | | The eighth library in the US to be commissioned by Carnegie and only the second outside of Southwestern Pennsylvania. Building destroyed by fire in 1939 |
| 23 | San Antonio | San Antonio | | Jan 6, 1900 | $70,000 | | Building demolished |
| 24 | Sherman | Sherman | | Apr 3, 1912 | $20,000 | 301 S Walnut | Now The Sherman Museum |
| 25 | Stamford | Stamford | | Jun 29, 1908 | $15,000 | 600 E McHarg St | Still the Stamford Carnegie Library |
| 26 | Sulphur Springs | Sulphur Springs | | Apr 10, 1909 | $12,000 | 100 Jefferson St W | Now Alliance Bank |
| 27 | Temple | Temple | | Jan 22, 1902 | $15,000 | | Building destroyed by fire in 1918 |
| 28 | Terrell | Terrell | | Feb 20, 1903 | $10,000 | 207 N Frances St | Now the Terrell Heritage Museum |
| 29 | Tyler | Tyler | | Mar 20, 1903 | $15,000 | 125 S College St | Now the Smith County History Center |
| 30 | Vernon | Vernon | | Apr 19, 1915 | $12,500 | | Building demolished in late 1970s |
| 31 | Waco | Waco | | Apr 28, 1902 | $30,000 | | Building demolished |
| 32 | Winnsboro | Winnsboro | | Apr 6, 1908 | $10,000 | | Building demolished in 1967 |

== Academic library ==
| | Institution | Locality | Image | Date granted | Grant amount | Location | Notes |
|---|---|---|---|---|---|---|---|
| 1 | Wiley University | Marshall | | Mar 26, 1906 | $15,000 | 711 Wiley Ave. | Now the Willis J. King Administration Building |

== See also ==
- List of libraries in the United States
