= National Register of Historic Places listings in Jones County, Texas =

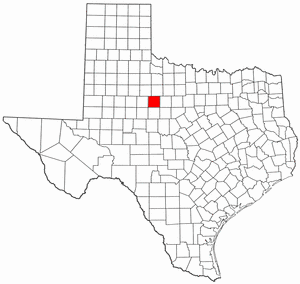
Location of Jones County in Texas

This is a list of the National Register of Historic Places in Jones County, Texas.

This is intended to be a complete list of properties listed on the National Register of Historic Places in Jones County, Texas. There are 22 properties listed on the National Register in the county. Three of these are also Recorded Texas Historic Landmarks.

This National Park Service list is complete through NPS recent listings posted March 27, 2026.

== Current listings ==
The locations of National Register properties may be seen in a mapping service provided.

	Name on the Register	Image	Date listed	Location	City or town	Description
1	J. P. Astin House	J. P. Astin House	September 24, 1986 (#86002390)	111 E. Campbell; 32°56′56″N 99°48′06″W	Stamford	
2	Buena Vista Hotel	Buena Vista Hotel	September 24, 1986 (#86002369)	123 N. Wetherbee; 32°56′47″N 99°48′07″W	Stamford	
3	Dr. E. P. Bunkley House and Garage	Dr. E. P. Bunkley House and Garage	September 24, 1986 (#86002380)	1034 E. Reynolds; 32°56′25″N 99°47′12″W	Stamford	
4	First Baptist Church	First Baptist Church	September 24, 1986 (#86002359)	E. Oliver and N. Swenson; 32°56′50″N 99°48′08″W	Stamford	Recorded Texas Historic Landmark
5	Fort Phantom Hill	Fort Phantom Hill	September 14, 1972 (#72001367)	N of Abilene on Ranch Rd. 600; 32°38′38″N 99°40′41″W	Abilene	
6	House at 501 North Swenson	House at 501 North Swenson	September 24, 1986 (#86002374)	501 N. Swenson; 32°57′01″N 99°48′12″W	Stamford	
7	House at 502 South Orient	House at 502 South Orient	September 24, 1986 (#86002377)	502 S. Orient; 32°56′25″N 99°47′41″W	Stamford	
8	House at 610 East Oliver	House at 610 East Oliver	September 24, 1986 (#86002394)	610 E. Oliver; 32°56′50″N 99°47′43″W	Stamford	
9	House at 709 East Reynolds	House at 709 East Reynolds	September 24, 1986 (#86002384)	709 E. Reynolds; 32°56′28″N 99°47′37″W	Stamford	
10	House at 719 East Reynolds	House at 719 East Reynolds	September 24, 1986 (#86002385)	719 E. Reynolds; 32°56′28″N 99°47′35″W	Stamford	
11	House at 815 East Campbell		September 24, 1986 (#86002392)	815 E. Campbell; 32°56′56″N 99°47′28″W	Stamford	
12	A. J. Jackson House		September 24, 1986 (#86002366)	305 S. Ferguson; 32°56′33″N 99°48′02″W	Stamford	Demolished
13	Jones County Courthouse	Jones County Courthouse	May 1, 2003 (#03000330)	1100 12th St. 32°45′23″N 99°53′47″W	Anson	Recorded Texas Historic Landmark
14	Old Bryant-Link Building	Old Bryant-Link Building	September 24, 1986 (#86002361)	120 S. Swenson; 32°56′41″N 99°48′11″W	Stamford	
15	Old Penick-Hughes Company	Old Penick-Hughes Company	September 24, 1986 (#86002354)	100-106 E. Hamilton; 32°56′38″N 99°48′09″W	Stamford	
16	Old West Texas Utilities Company	Old West Texas Utilities Company	September 24, 1986 (#86002335)	127 E. McHarg; 32°56′44″N 99°48′06″W	Stamford	
17	Old H. O. Wooten Grocery		September 24, 1986 (#86002363)	128 E. Rotan; 32°56′34″N 99°48′06″W	Stamford	Demolished
18	Saint John's Methodist Church	Saint John's Methodist Church	September 24, 1986 (#86002351)	S. Ferguson St. 32°56′38″N 99°47′59″W	Stamford	Recorded Texas Historic Landmark
19	SMS Building	SMS Building	September 24, 1986 (#86002336)	101 S. Wetherbee and 210 E. McHarg; 32°56′42″N 99°48′05″W	Stamford	
20	Stamford City Hall	Stamford City Hall	September 24, 1986 (#86002348)	201 E. McHarg; 32°56′44″N 99°48′05″W	Stamford	
21	A. J. Swenson House		September 24, 1986 (#86002395)	305 E. Oliver; 32°56′52″N 99°47′48″W	Stamford	
22	US Post Office	US Post Office	September 24, 1986 (#86002332)	115 S. Swenson St. 32°56′41″N 99°48′08″W	Stamford	

== See also ==
- National Register of Historic Places listings in Texas
- Recorded Texas Historic Landmarks in Jones County
