= Swante M. Swenson =

Swante Magnus Swenson
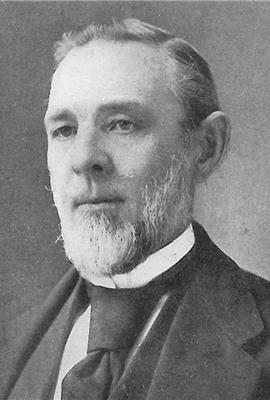
- Born: Sven Magnus Svensson; February 24, 1816; Barkeryd, Sweden-Norway
- Died: June 13, 1896 (aged 80); Brooklyn, New York, US
- Resting place: Woodlawn Cemetery, Bronx
- Citizenship: American
- Occupations: Banker, businessman
- Known for: Father of Swedish emigration to Texas; founder of Swenson Land & Cattle Co.; introduced the Colt revolver in Texas
- Spouses: Jeanette W. Long 1843; Susan Margaret McCready 1851

Swante M. Swenson (February 24, 1816 – June 13, 1896) was the founder of the SMS ranches in West Texas. It was through his efforts that Swedish immigration to Texas was begun in 1848. In 1972, he was inducted into the Hall of Great Westerners of the National Cowboy & Western Heritage Museum.

== Biography ==
Svante Magnus Svenson was born at Alarp, Barkeryd Parish, Jönköping County, Sweden. He migrated to America in 1836, where he worked in New York City before traveling to Baltimore, Maryland, and then to Galveston. In 1850 Swenson moved to Austin and established a mercantile business with his uncle Swante Palm. While running the business, Swenson continued to buy Texas Railroad Certificates and to acquire land.

Swenson arranged passage for Swedish families principally from Småland, who in turn worked for Swenson to pay off the price of the ticket. Most of the early immigrants also bought land from Swenson.

Swenson began shipments of the Texas pecan to the North and East; and in 1850 established himself in the general merchandise and banking business at Austin. In Austin, Swenson also served two terms (in 1852 and 1856) as a Travis County commissioner and in 1853 became the first treasurer of the State Agricultural Society.

In 1854 he invested in the Buffalo Bayou, Brazos and Colorado Railway, which gained him acres of land in northwestern and western Texas. Swenson's greatest interest lay in the accumulation of land. He traded many of the manifold supplies carried by his large frontier trading post for Texas railroad land certificates. Under the privilege then accorded to holders and owners of such certificates to file on any untaken state land, Swenson in 1854 began acquiring acreage of unclaimed properties in Northwest Texas. By 1860 he owned over 128,000 acres around Austin, in addition to his West Texas holdings, which had increased to nearly 500,000 acres.

SMS Ranches eventually became one of the largest landowners in Texas. Swenson leased his ranch holdings to his sons, who operated the ranches under the name of Swenson Brothers Cattle Company from headquarters in Stamford, Texas.

Swenson established the banking house of S. M. Swenson and Sons in New York City. Though he lived in New York, he maintained his ties to Texas, operating a clearinghouse for Texas products, continuing his work as a cotton agent, and regularly visiting his extensive land holdings. Swenson died in Brooklyn, New York, and was buried in Woodlawn Cemetery (Bronx, New York).

On September 3, 1850, Swenson purchased a city lot in Austin. In 1854, he built the Swenson Building on Congress Avenue where the current Piedmont Hotel stands today. Inside the building, on the first floor, were a drug store, a general goods store, a hardware store, and a grocery store; a hotel, (named the Avenue Hotel but locally known as the Stringer’s Hotel) was located on the upper two levels of the building. The Travis County Deeds Records show that sometime later, Swenson leased the hotel to a John Stringer, giving the hotel its name “the Stringer’s Hotel.” An 1885 Austin city Sanborn map of the Swenson Building shows that Swenson had a room built for “servants” in the hotel portion of the building. There is no documentation detailing whether enslaved people stayed in that room since the Sanborn map is dated twenty years after the Civil War.

Through his trade dealings in the south, Swenson befriended a slaveholder by the name of George Long, who then hired Swenson to work at his newly relocated plantation in Texas. A year later, when Long died due to poor health, Swenson married his widow, who then too died of tuberculosis three years later. By 1843, Swenson became a full-scale slaveholder in Texas through inheriting his now-deceased wife’s plantation. In 1848, he enlarged his property holdings by purchasing the adjoining plantation and expanding his cotton crop. In 1850, along with purchasing 182 acres a few miles outside of Austin, he bought the lot on Congress Avenue and constructed the Swenson Building and inside, the Stringer’s Hotel.

According to the Texas State Historical Association Handbook of Texas, during the secession crisis, Swenson, who opposed both northern and southern radicalism, agreed to help Governor Sam Houston in an attempt to prevent Texas secession; Swenson was to raise supplies for an independent Texas army and in 1861 was promised a commission as quartermaster-general on Houston's staff, a position with the rank of colonel. When the effort failed, Swenson, who by this time had sold all his slaves, remained in Texas but vowed that he would not aid the South and that he would never take up arms against the United States.

Swenson married twice. With his second wife, Susan McRady, he had five children:

- Sarah Margareta "Greta" Swenson (October 23, 1852 – November 19, 1879)
- Eric Pierson Swenson (April 24, 1855 – August 14, 1945) – founded Freeport Sulphur
- Ebba McRady Swenson (1858–1859)
- Swen Albin Swenson (July 30, 1860 – November 16, 1927)
- Mary Eleonora "Nora" Swenson (August 24, 1862 – February 23, 1958).

His two sons leased SMS ranches and carried on the family business.

== See also ==
- Stamford, Texas
- Morab
- Swenson, Texas

== Sources ==
- Clarke, Mary Whatley The Swenson Saga and the SMS Ranches (Austin: Jenkins, 1976)
- Swenson, Gail S. M. Swenson and the Development of the SMS Ranches (University of Texas, 1960)
- Anderson, August Hyphenated, or The Life Story of S. M. Swenson (Austin: Steck, 1916)
- Hastings, Frank S. The Story of the S.M.S. Ranch (Swenson Bros. Stamford, Texas. 1917)

   “Negroes for Sale.” The Texas Almanac. December 27, 1862, 1 edition, sec. 34.
   “Texas General Land Office Land Grant Database”, Digital Images, Texas General Land Office, Entry for Swenson, S M, Austin City Lots, Travis Co., TX, Patent no 429, vol.1
   “Austin 1885 Sheet 5,” Sanborn Fire Insurance Maps, Map Collection, Perry-Castañeda Library, Austin, Texas.
   Olmsted, Frederick Law. A Journey through Texas: or, A Saddle-Trip on the Southwestern Frontier. Austin: University of Texas Press, 1989: 50;
   Austin City Sanborn Map, 1885;
   Bullock Hotel. Photograph, University of North Texas Libraries, The Portal to Texas History, accessed December 3, 2019
