= Frank Shelby Groner =

American lawyer (1877–1943)

Frank Shelby Groner (January 7, 1877 – November 8, 1943) was an American lawyer, pastor of Baptist churches, chairman of the Southern Baptist Hospital Commission, executive secretary of the Baptist General Convention of Texas, director of fund-raising in Texas for the Southern Baptist Convention, founder of the Baptist Student Division and the Department of Evangelism, president of the College of Marshall, Texas (now East Texas Baptist University), and author of several religious books.

== Early life ==
Frank Shelby Groner was born near the town of Weston, Texas, in Collin County, Texas, to William Christopher Groner and Cleopatra Clementine Dunnegan on January 7, 1877. His parents moved to Graham, Texas, when he was three years old, where he started to preach by using a flat-top trunk as a pulpit. Groner was the first-born of four boys and four girls. The family later moved to a farm in Jack County, Texas, where he attended a school where his father was the teacher, until he was 14.

He first attended the short-lived North Texas Baptist College in Jacksboro, Texas, from the age of 14 where he was awarded a Master of Science degree in 1896. His graduating thesis was on the subject of "The Evidence of Christianity as shown in Profane History".

== Adult life ==
=== School teacher ===
Groner taught school for three years after graduation, one year in Jack County and two years in Benjamin, Texas.

=== Law practice ===
Groner early settled on a career in law. Groner then studied at the University of Texas Law School. Groner was nominated as county attorney by the Jack County Democratic Society near the end of his second year in law school. He immediately took the bar exam. He passed the bar exam in 1900 and was elected as county attorney.

Groner's served as county attorney of Jack County from 1900 to 1904. after which he entered private practice of law.

=== Baptist pastor ===
Groner then entered the Baptist ministry as pastor of the First Baptist Church of Stamford, Texas, where he was ordained in 1905 and was pastor for seven years. In the course of his pastorship, the existing church building became too small and a new building was built. The congregation increased in size from 147 to about 750 at the time of his departure.

Groner became the second pastor of the Columbus Avenue Baptist Church in Waco, Texas, in 1911, where he succeeded the Reverend R. G. Bowers, a position which he held until 1918, when he resigned to become executive secretary of the Baptist General Convention of Texas (BGCT).

=== Baptist executive ===
Groner was selected to head the Southern Baptist Hospital Commission in 1916. He was able to raise sufficient funds to found Hillcrest Baptist Hospital in Waco, Texas, and the Southern Baptist Hospital in New Orleans, Louisiana. In 1918, he relocated to Dallas, Texas. He served as executive secretary of the BGCT until June 1928. He is reported to have served "wisely and well".

He also accepted the directorship for Texas of the Southern Baptist Convention's $75 million fundraising campaign in 1920. He raised $12 million in Texas despite the opposition of J. Frank Norris.

=== College president ===
Groner was chosen as president of the College of Marshall in Marshall, Texas, in June 1928. Groner used his financial skills to greatly enlarge the College of Marshall by acquiring additional property and buildings. Groner served as president of the College of Marshall for 14 years and stepped down in 1942 due to ill health; he was then appointed president emeritus of the College of Marshall.

=== Author ===
Groner also found time in the course of his life to author several books on Christianity, including:

- The Witness of Great Minds to Christian Verities
- Christian Education
- Our Sainted Loved Ones

== Honors ==
Howard Payne College and Baylor University granted honorary doctorates to Groner in recognition of his service to the College of Marshall.

== Personal life ==
Groner met Laura Virginia Wyatt (1878–1951) of Cleveland County, Arkansas, while they were both students at North Texas Baptist College. They were married in 1903 and had seven children.

Groner was a close friend of Patrick Morris Neff, president of Baylor University and Governor of Texas, for whom he named his last child. He was a member of the Democratic Party and a Mason.

== Death and burial ==
Groner died at the age of 66 in a hospital in Marshall on November 8, 1943, following a cerebral hemorrhage. A funeral service was held in Marshall, followed by a second funeral service in Waco, Texas. He was buried in Oakwood Cemetery, Waco.
