= SMS ranches =

The SMS Ranches are a famous group of cattle ranches located in West Texas.

== Background ==
Swante M. Swenson migrated to America from Sweden during 1836. In 1850 Swenson moved to Austin, Texas and established a mercantile business with his uncle Swante Palm. While running the business, Swenson continued to buy railroad land and then bought school scripts to acquire additional property. In 1854 Svenson invested in the Buffalo Bayou, Brazos and Colorado Railway, which gained him acres of land in northwestern and western Texas.

SMS Ranches eventually became one of the largest landowners in Texas. At their peak, the SMS Ranches occupy considerable portions of twelve counties in the lower plains area of West Texas and comprise more than 300,000 acres (1,200 km^{2}). The ranches were named for the initials of the founder, Swante M. Swenson. The SMS brand, consisting of an extended M sandwiched between two reversed S's, was registered by the Swensons in the spring of 1882. At one time most, if not all, foremen of the SMS Ranches were immigrant Swedes. Swenson leased his holdings to his sons, who operated them under the name of Swenson Brothers Cattle Company from headquarters in Stamford, Texas.

=== Ranching Units ===
- Throckmorton Ranch - located in Throckmorton County
- Flat Top Ranch - located in Jones County, Stonewall County, and Haskell County
- Ericsdahl Ranch - located in Jones County and Haskell County
- Tongue River Ranch - located in Cottle County, King County, Motley County, and Dickens County
- Ellerslie Ranch - located in Jones County and Haskell County

== Primary sources ==
- Clark, Mary Whatley The Swenson Saga and the SMS Ranches (Austin, Texas: Jenkins Book Publishing Co. 1976)
- Swenson, Gail S. M. Swenson and the Development of the SMS Ranches (University of Texas, 1960)
- Hastings, Frank S The Story of the SMS Ranch (S. M. Swenson & Sons. 1922)
- Anderson, August Hyphenated, or The Life Story of S. M. Swenson (Austin: Steck, 1916)
