= Texas Park Road 68 =

Street park in taxas

PR 68
- Hueco Tanks State Park Road
- PR 68 highlighted in red

Route information
- Maintained by TxDOT
- Length: 2.060 mi (3.315 km)
- Existed: 1974–present

Major junctions
- South end: RM 2775
- North end: Hueco Tanks State Historic Site

Location
- Country: United States
- State: Texas
- Counties: El Paso

Highway system
- Highways in Texas; Interstate; US; State; Former; Toll; Loops; Spurs; FM/RM; Park; Rec
← PR 67	→ PR 69

Texas Park Road 68 (Hueco Tanks State Park Road) is a state park road in Hueco Tanks State Historic Site in El Paso County, Texas.

== Route description ==
The southern terminus of Park Road 68 is at RM 2775 at the southern boundary of Hueco Tanks State Historic Site. It proceeds two miles (3.2 km) northward from there, entirely within the state park.

== History ==
Park Road 68 was established along its current route in 1974.

== Major intersections ==
The entire route is in El Paso County.

Location	mi	km	Destinations	Notes
Hueco Tanks State Historic Site	0.0	0.0	RM 2775	Southern terminus
Hueco Tanks State Historic Site	2.1	3.4		Northern terminus
1.000 mi = 1.609 km; 1.000 km = 0.621 mi
