= Jefferson Carnegie Library =

Library in Texas, USA

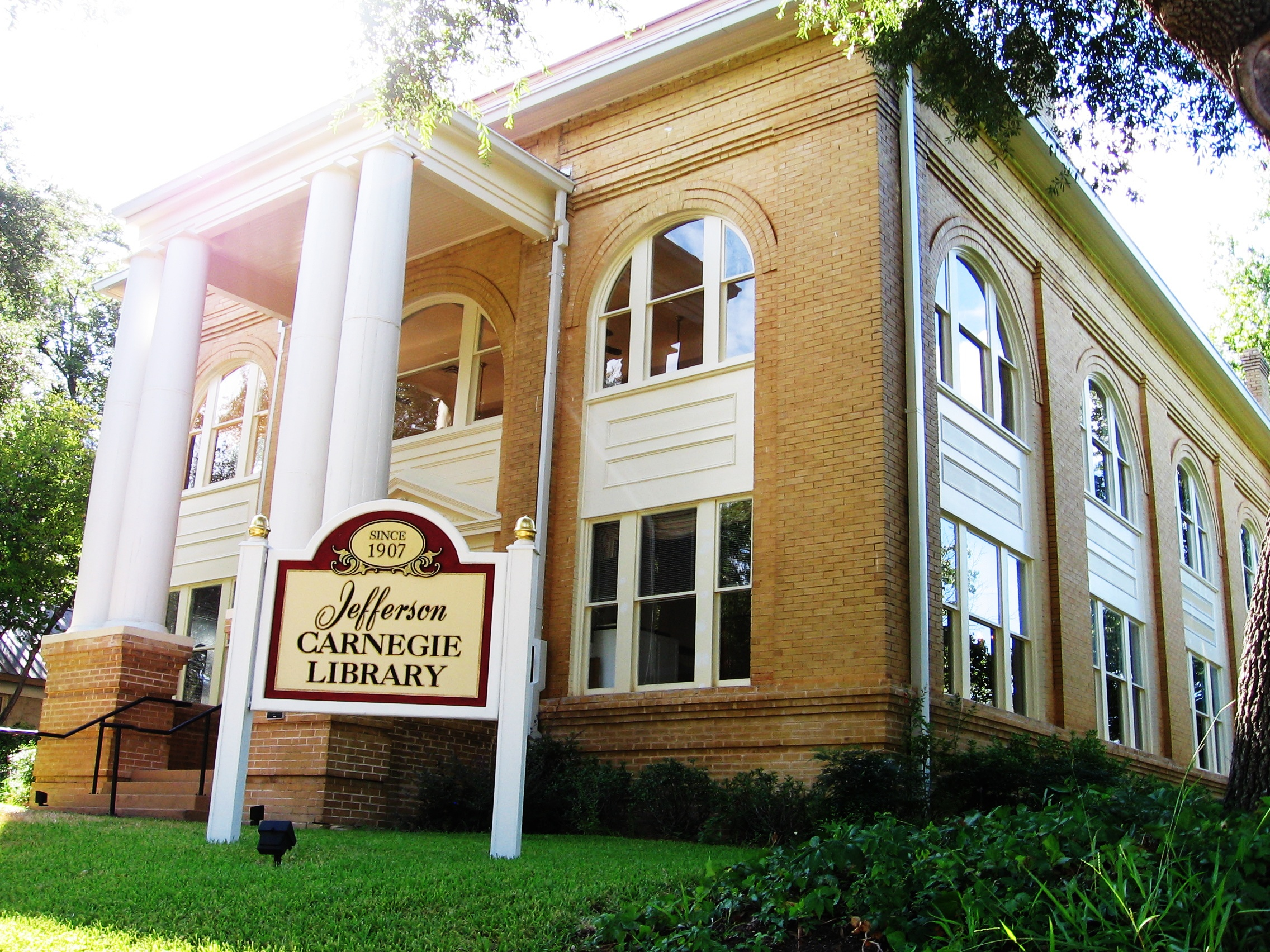
The Carnegie Library in Jefferson, Texas in 2010

The Jefferson Carnegie Library is a library in Jefferson, Texas, built with money donated by Scottish-American businessman and philanthropist Andrew Carnegie. Hallett & Rawson of Des Moines were the architects. Built in 1907, it is one of four libraries in Texas, from the original 34, to currently operate as a library.

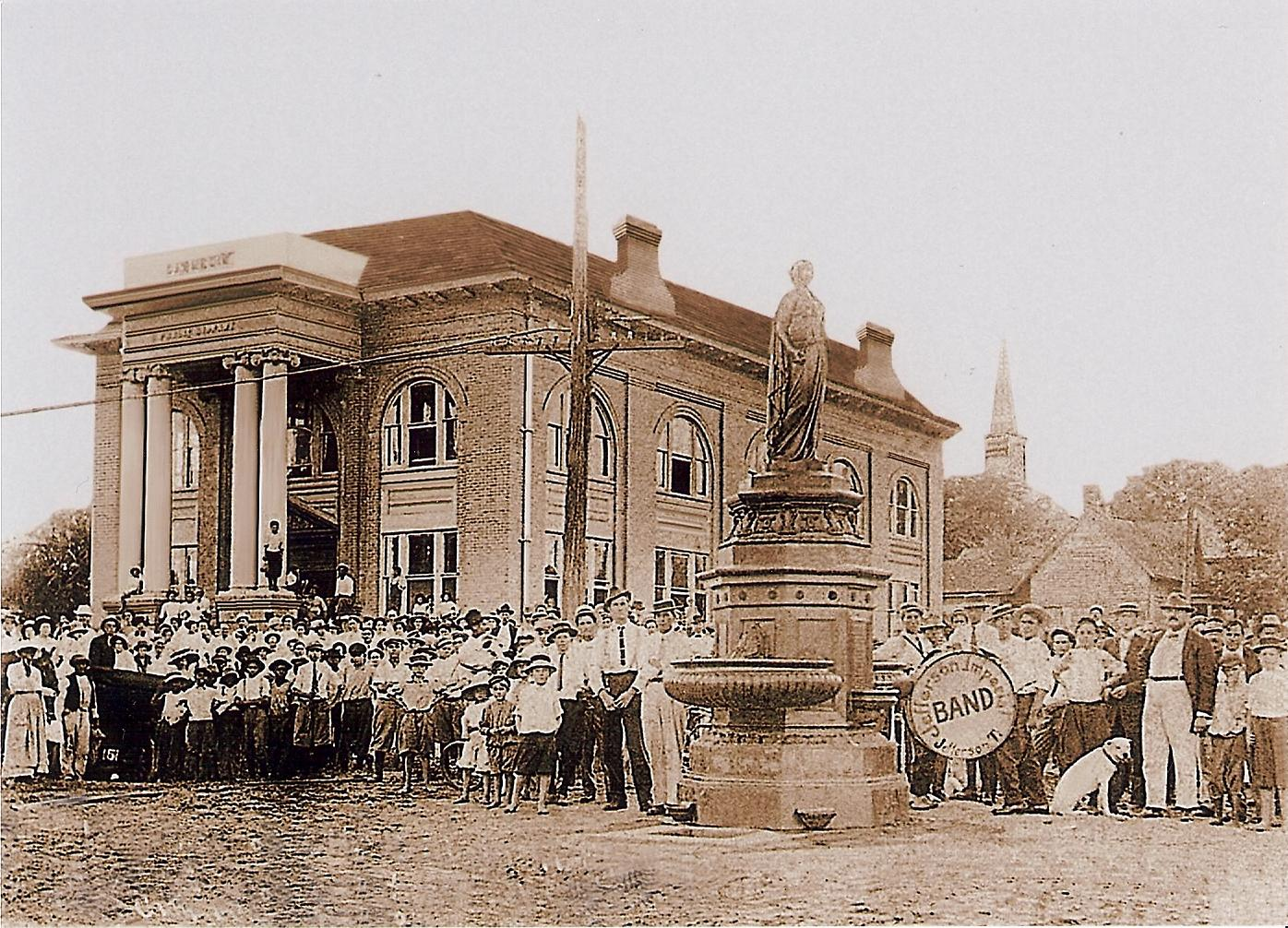
The Carnegie Library in 1913

== History ==
The ladies of the Jefferson Library Association proposed that a restroom be built and that the fees generated by its use pay for library services. Also, a ten-cent tea was planned at the building the library was occupying on Walnut Street, and proceeds were designated for buying a badly needed bookcase for the two hundred volume collection. Both of these ideas did not work, so in 1907, the library association received a grant from Andrew Carnegie for $7,500 to build a library on the condition that the city appropriate a budget for its upkeep.

== Continuing legacy ==
In 2007, the library began a restoration project which was recognized by the Lucille Terry Award.

== See also ==
- List of Carnegie libraries in the United States
