= KVRP-FM =

Coordinates: 33.161°N 99.816°W

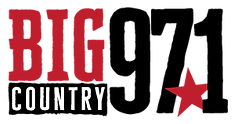

Haskell, Texas; United States
- Broadcast area: Abilene, Texas
- Frequency: 97.1 MHz
- Branding: Big Country 97.1

Programming
- Format: Country
- Affiliations: Compass Media Networks

Ownership
- Owner: 1 Chronicles 14, L.P.
- Sister stations: KVRP

History
- First air date: 1981

Technical information
- Licensing authority: FCC
- Facility ID: 57464
- Class: C1
- ERP: 100,000 watts
- HAAT: 162 meters (531 ft)

Links
- Public license information: Public file; LMS
- Webcast: Listen Live
- Website: kvrp.com

KVRP-FM (97.1 MHz) is a commercial radio station in Haskell in the U.S. state of Texas, broadcasting to the Abilene, Texas, area. KVRP-FM airs a country music format branded as "Big Country".

The station is owned by 1 Chronicles 14, L.P., which is based in San Antonio, Texas.

KVRP-FM is an affiliate of the Texas Tech Red Raiders and airs Texas Tech football, basketball and baseball.
