= KVRP (AM) =

Coordinates: 32°55′52″N 99°47′00″W

Stamford, Texas; United States
- Broadcast area: Abilene, Texas
- Frequency: 1400 (kHz)
- Branding: AM 1400 The River

Programming
- Format: Christian Contemporary

Ownership
- Owner: 1 Chronicles 14, L.P.
- Sister stations: KVRP-FM

History
- First air date: 1947

Technical information
- Licensing authority: FCC
- Facility ID: 57475
- Class: C
- Power: 1,000 Watts
- Translator: (104.5 MHz) K283CU (Haskell)

Links
- Public license information: Public file; LMS
- Website: KVRP FM

KVRP (1400 AM) is a commercial radio station located in Stamford, Texas, broadcasting to the northern sections of the Abilene, Texas, area. KVRP airs a Christian contemporary music format branded as "The River". The programming is syndicated by Salem Radio Network.

The station is an affiliate of the Dallas Cowboys radio network.
