= A68 =

A68 or A-68 may refer to:

== Roads ==
- A68 motorway (France), a road connecting Toulouse and Albi
- A68 road (Great Britain), a road connecting Darlington in England and Dalkeith in Scotland
- A-68, a major road in Spain renamed Autopista AP-68

== Other ==
- Benoni Defense, in the Encyclopaedia of Chess Openings
- HLA-A68, an HLA-A serotype
- A68 protein, a protein used to diagnose Alzheimer's disease that is also found in foetuses and infants up to 2 years of age
- Iceberg A-68, name for the iceberg calved from Larsen C ice shelf in Antarctica between 10 and 12 July 2017
