= Volente, Texas =

- Village
- Coordinates: 30°26′43″N 97°54′28″W
- Country: United States
- State: Texas
- County: Travis

Government
  - Type: Village of Volente is a General Rule B city under the Local Government Codes of the State of Texas.

Area
  - Total: 2.12 sq mi (5.48 km^{2})
  - Land: 2.12 sq mi (5.48 km^{2})
  - Water: 0 sq mi (0.00 km^{2})
- Elevation: 883 ft (269 m)

Population (2020)
  - Total: 561
  - Density: 265/sq mi (102/km^{2})
- Time zone: UTC-6 (Central (CST))
  - Summer (DST): UTC-5 (CDT)
- ZIP code: 78641
- Area code: 512-250-2075
- FIPS code: 48-75752
- GNIS feature ID: 2413598
- Website: www.villageofvolente-tx.gov

Volente is a village in Travis County, Texas United States located on the north shore of Lake Travis. A post office was first established at Volente in 1886, with Andrew J. Stanford as postmaster but was not incorporated until 2003. The population was 561 at the 2020 census.

== Geography ==
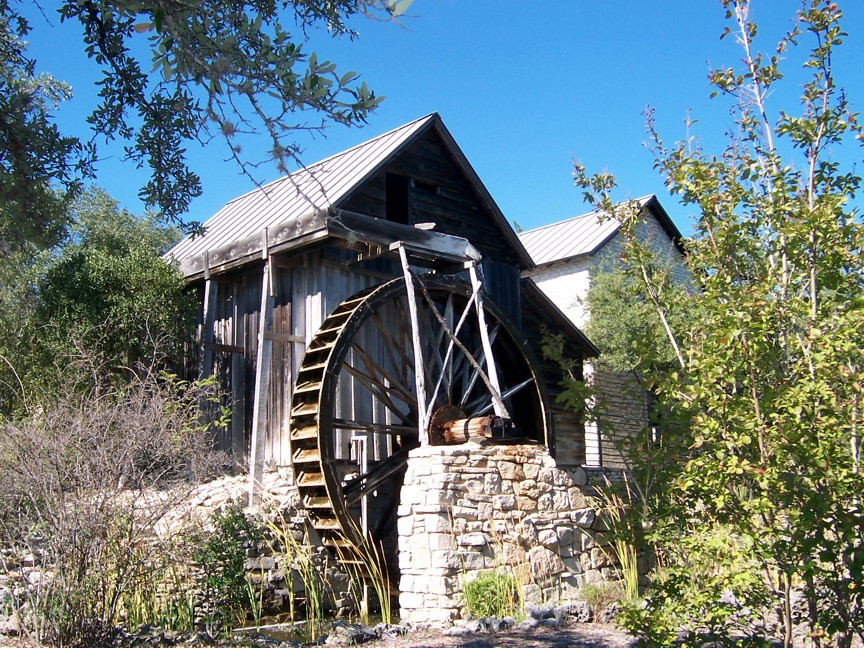
Anderson Mill Reproduction

Volente has a total area of 2.1 square miles (5.4 km^{2}), all land.

== Demographics ==
Historical population
| Census | Pop. | Note | %± |
|---|---|---|---|
| 2010 | 520 | | — |
| 2020 | 561 | | 7.9% |
U.S. Decennial Census

In terms of ethnicity, 84.4% were of Non-Hispanic White, 13.0% were of Hispanic and Latin-Americans, 3.0% were of Mixed origins. In terms of ancestry, 41.7% were of German, 30.0% were of English, 10.9% were of Irish, 7.3% were of French, 4.9% were of American, 3.9% were of Italian.
