= KLGD =

Coordinates: 32.938°N 99.956°W

- Stamford, Texas; United States
- Broadcast area: Stamford / Haskell / Aspermont / Anson / Hamlin / Abilene, Texas
- Frequency: 106.9 MHz
- Branding: KLGD 106.9 FM

Programming
- Format: Classic country
- Affiliations: Texas Agri Life

Ownership
- Owner: Vance Communications

History
- First air date: 2004 (as KJTZ)
- Former call signs: KJTZ (2004–2011)

Technical information
- Licensing authority: FCC
- Facility ID: 78557
- Class: C2
- ERP: 40,000 watts
- HAAT: 167 meters (548 ft)

Links
- Public license information: Public file; LMS

KLGD is an FM radio station licensed to Stamford, Texas that serves the Abilene, Texas area with classic country music. The KLGD studio is located in Abilene, and the transmitter is located west of Stamford in northern Jones County.
