= Stamford, Texas =

- City
- City of Stamford
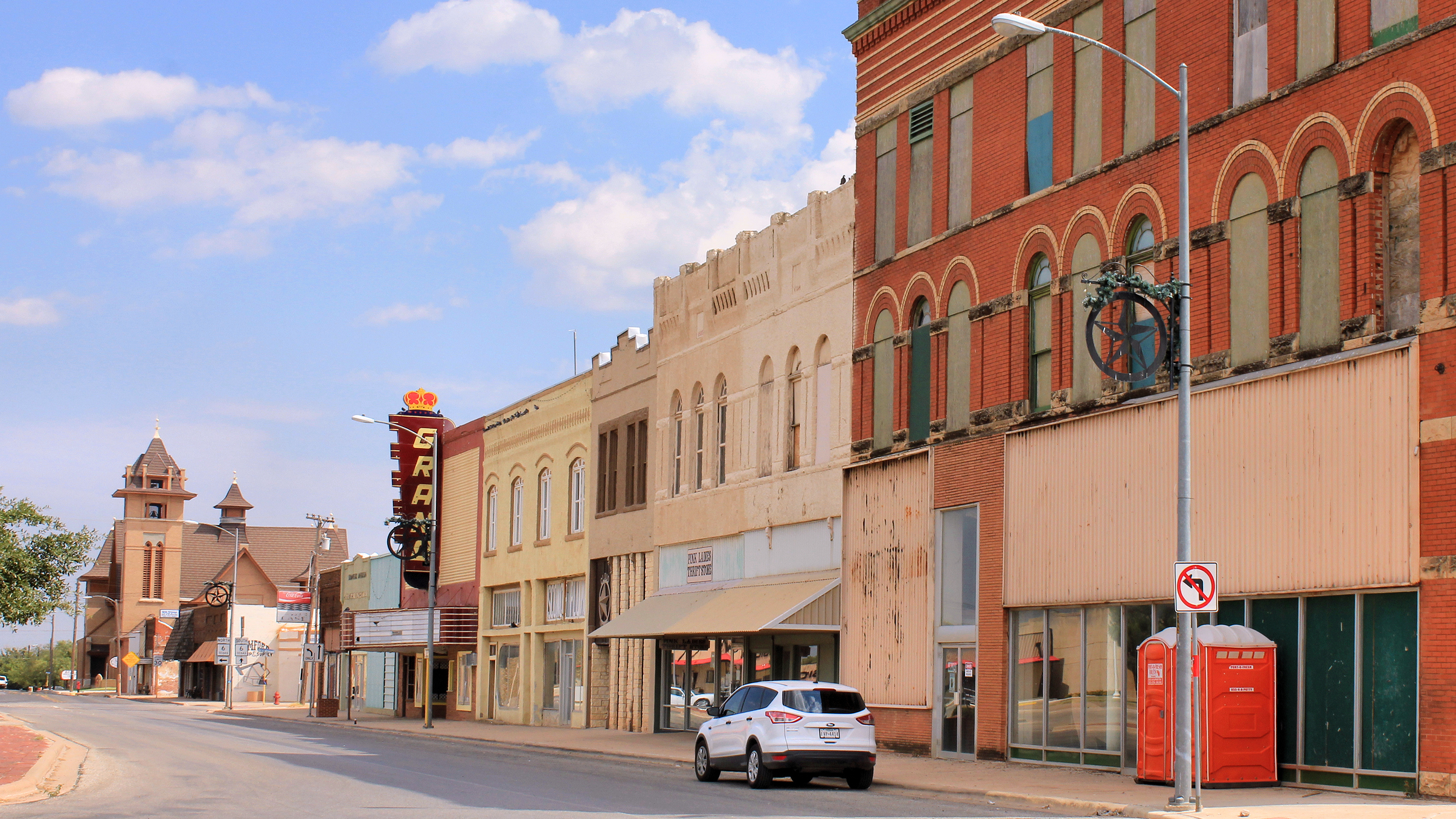
- Downtown Stamford

- Location within Texas Location within the United States
- Coordinates: 32°59′50″N 99°41′20″W
- Country: United States
- State: Texas
- Counties: Jones, Haskell
- Incorporated (city): 2 January 1900
- Named for: Stamford, Connecticut

Government
  - Type: Mayor-Council

Area
  - Total: 12.92 sq mi (33.46 km^{2})
  - Land: 5.96 sq mi (15.44 km^{2})
  - Water: 6.95 sq mi (18.01 km^{2})
- Elevation: 1,450 ft (440 m)

Population (2020)
  - Total: 2,907
  - Density: 487.6/sq mi (188.3/km^{2})
- Demonym: Stamfordite
- Time zone: UTC−6 (Central (CST))
  - Summer (DST): UTC−5 (CDT)
- ZIP code: 79553
- Area code: 325
- FIPS code: 48-69980
- GNIS feature ID: 2411966
- Website: www.stamfordtx.org

Stamford is a city on the border of Jones and Haskell counties in west-central Texas, United States. The population was 2,907 at the 2020 census. Henry McHarg, president of the Texas Central Railroad, named the site in 1900 for his hometown of Stamford, Connecticut. The city is home to the Texas Cowboy Reunion.

Stamford is on US 277 and SH 6. Most of the city is in Jones County. The portion of the city within Jones County is part of the Abilene Metro Area.

== History ==
While the town was named by Henry King McHarg for Stamford, Connecticut, the townsite was donated by the family of Swante Magnus Swenson. Mr. Swenson was the first Swedish immigrant to Texas. He became one of the largest landowners in Texas, and by 1860, his holdings in West Texas approached 500,000 acres (202,343 ha). These ranches, which spread across 12 Texas counties, became known as the SMS Ranches. Later reorganized as the Swenson Land and Cattle Company, it is headquartered in Stamford to this day. Mr. Swenson had two sons, Eric Pierson and Swen Albin, who became known as the Swenson brothers. They ran SMS Ranches, and even developed a Morab horse-breeding program near the city.

Swante M. Swenson is largely responsible for initiating and supporting Swedish immigration to Texas, starting in 1847. Mr. Swenson assisted Swedish immigrants with the cost of their passage from Sweden to Texas in exchange for their labor. In 1899, the Swenson brothers persuaded Henry McHarg, president of the Texas Central Railroad, to extend the railroad through their land. The brothers then founded Stamford in 1900 and provided the townsite of 640 acres (259 ha). The town and surrounding area were then partially settled by immigrants from Sweden. Many of the cotton farmers who moved to the area bought tracts of land from the Swenson brothers. Stamford's main street is named Swenson.

In 1900, the railroad arrived in Stamford, when the independent Texas Central Railway completed its 38-mile (61 km) line from Albany to the town. In 1906–7, the Texas Central built another line, connecting Stamford with Rotan. By 1908, Stamford was connected to points north and east, through a line of the Wichita Valley Railroad running south from Seymour and commissioned expressly for this purpose.

Stamford College was founded as Stamford Collegiate Institute in September 1907 by the Northwest Texas Methodist Conference. Drought and World War I caused declining enrollments, and the college was closed in 1918 after a fire. The president of Stamford College went on to found McMurry University in Abilene.

In 1930, the Swensons were largely responsible for the founding of the annual Texas Cowboy Reunion.

The city's general-aviation airport, Arledge Field, began operation in April 1941 as an Army Air Corps training center during World War II.

For the city's first half century, order was kept by police chief George G. Flournoy. A small, crippled, cigar-chewing man, Flournoy began each day's work with target shooting at a stump outside city hall.

In 1967, the rail line which connected Stamford to Albany and Waco was abandoned by the Missouri, Kansas & Texas Railway, which had leased the Texas Central since 1914. Though the line from Stamford to Rotan was reacquired by the Texas Central Railway, it was sold three years later to the Fort Worth & Denver Railway Company, and subsequently abandoned.

== Geography ==
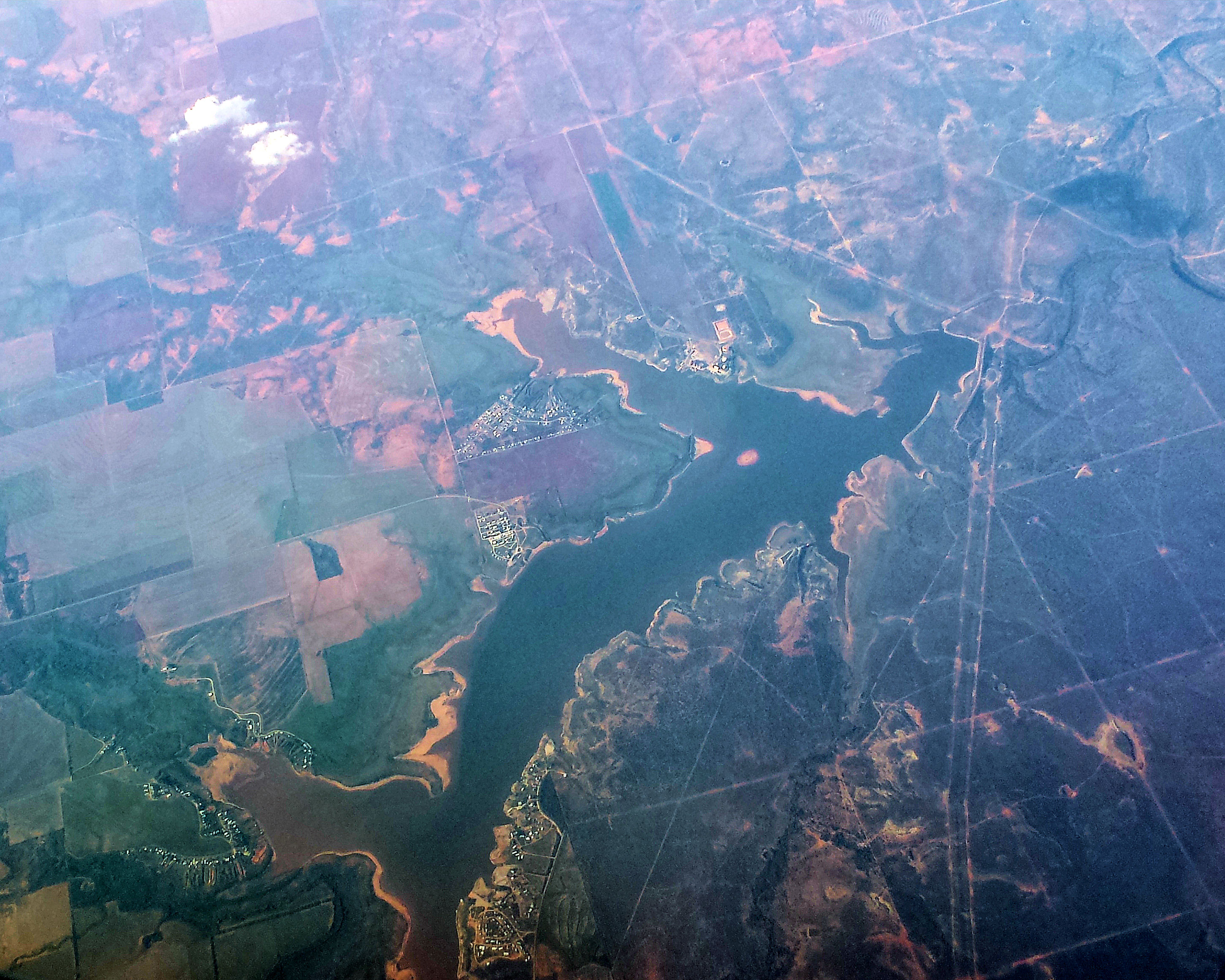
Lake Stamford from 34,000 feet

Stamford is located in west-central Texas, and is part of the Southwest. The city is also part of the physical region in West Texas known as the Rolling Plains.

Stamford is 41 miles (66 km) north of Abilene, 132 miles (212 km) west of Fort Worth, 137 miles (220 km) east southeast of Lubbock, and 160 miles (257 km) due west of DFW Airport.

According to the United States Census Bureau, the city has a total area of 12.9 square miles (33.5 km^{2}), of which 5.9 square miles (15.4 km^{2}) are land and 6.9 square miles (18.0 km^{2}), or 53.85%, are covered by water.

=== Lake Stamford ===
Lake Stamford, owned by the city, is located about 10 miles (16 km) northeast of the city proper. The lake was created in 1953 by the impoundment of Paint Creek in Haskell County. Lake Stamford serves as the municipal water source for Stamford, as well as several neighboring communities and rural water suppliers. The lake also provides recreational fishing and boating.

== Climate ==
Stamford has a semiarid climate, according to the Köppen climate classification. Stamford's record high temperature was 118 °F (48 °C) on June 28, 1994, and the record low temperature was −7 °F (−22 °C) on February 2, 1985. Average annual rainfall is 24.7 in (630 mm). Record snowfall of 8 in (200 mm) occurred on two separate dates: November 25, 2007, and April 6, 1996. In September 1900, months after Stamford was formed, the 1900 Galveston hurricane caused flooding in the city and reportedly killed 10 people. Because of its position at the southern edge of Tornado Alley, Stamford is susceptible to supercell thunderstorms, which produce large hail and can produce tornadoes.

Climate data for Stamford, Texas, 1991–2020 normals, extremes 1911–present
Month	Jan	Feb	Mar	Apr	May	Jun	Jul	Aug	Sep	Oct	Nov	Dec	Year
Record high °F (°C)	87 (31)	96 (36)	97 (36)	106 (41)	113 (45)	118 (48)	113 (45)	111 (44)	109 (43)	103 (39)	92 (33)	96 (36)	118 (48)
Mean maximum °F (°C)	78.3 (25.7)	82.5 (28.1)	89.1 (31.7)	95.4 (35.2)	101.4 (38.6)	103.5 (39.7)	105.3 (40.7)	104.7 (40.4)	100.1 (37.8)	93.9 (34.4)	84.5 (29.2)	78.6 (25.9)	107.1 (41.7)
Mean daily maximum °F (°C)	56.1 (13.4)	60.5 (15.8)	69.2 (20.7)	78.1 (25.6)	86.0 (30.0)	93.4 (34.1)	97.4 (36.3)	96.5 (35.8)	88.4 (31.3)	78.2 (25.7)	66.1 (18.9)	57.3 (14.1)	77.3 (25.1)
Daily mean °F (°C)	43.1 (6.2)	46.9 (8.3)	55.3 (12.9)	63.8 (17.7)	73.0 (22.8)	81.0 (27.2)	84.9 (29.4)	83.8 (28.8)	75.9 (24.4)	65.1 (18.4)	53.1 (11.7)	44.6 (7.0)	64.2 (17.9)
Mean daily minimum °F (°C)	30.1 (−1.1)	33.4 (0.8)	41.4 (5.2)	49.5 (9.7)	60.0 (15.6)	68.6 (20.3)	72.4 (22.4)	71.2 (21.8)	63.4 (17.4)	51.9 (11.1)	40.1 (4.5)	31.9 (−0.1)	51.2 (10.6)
Mean minimum °F (°C)	16.8 (−8.4)	19.0 (−7.2)	25.1 (−3.8)	34.4 (1.3)	45.3 (7.4)	59.8 (15.4)	65.5 (18.6)	64.0 (17.8)	51.0 (10.6)	35.6 (2.0)	24.7 (−4.1)	18.5 (−7.5)	12.1 (−11.1)
Record low °F (°C)	−1 (−18)	−7 (−22)	10 (−12)	24 (−4)	34 (1)	50 (10)	50 (10)	52 (11)	38 (3)	20 (−7)	10 (−12)	−2 (−19)	−7 (−22)
Average precipitation inches (mm)	1.16 (29)	1.40 (36)	1.75 (44)	2.05 (52)	3.27 (83)	4.03 (102)	1.73 (44)	2.09 (53)	3.05 (77)	2.38 (60)	1.47 (37)	1.33 (34)	25.71 (651)
Average snowfall inches (cm)	1.0 (2.5)	1.0 (2.5)	0.1 (0.25)	0.3 (0.76)	0.0 (0.0)	0.0 (0.0)	0.0 (0.0)	0.0 (0.0)	0.0 (0.0)	0.1 (0.25)	0.5 (1.3)	0.6 (1.5)	3.6 (9.06)
Average precipitation days (≥ 0.01 in)	3.4	3.6	4.1	4.0	6.2	5.5	3.3	3.9	4.7	4.3	3.2	3.0	49.2
Average snowy days (≥ 0.1 in)	0.5	0.5	0.1	0.0	0.0	0.0	0.0	0.0	0.0	0.1	0.3	0.3	1.8
Source 1: NOAA
Source 2: National Weather Service

== Demographics ==
Historical population
Census	Pop.	Note	%±
1910	3,902		—
1920	3,704		−5.1%
1930	4,095		10.6%
1940	4,810		17.5%
1950	5,819		21.0%
1960	5,259		−9.6%
1970	4,558		−13.3%
1980	4,542		−0.4%
1990	3,817		−16.0%
2000	3,636		−4.7%
2010	3,124		−14.1%
2020	2,907		−6.9%
U.S. Census Bureau Texas Almanac

=== 2020 census ===
As of the 2020 census, Stamford had a population of 2,907. The median age was 41.7 years; 25.2% of residents were under the age of 18 and 20.4% of residents were 65 years of age or older. For every 100 females there were 93.3 males, and for every 100 females age 18 and over there were 91.0 males.

0.0% of residents lived in urban areas, while 100.0% lived in rural areas.

There were 1,136 households, including 852 families, of which 30.0% had children under the age of 18 living in them. Of all households, 44.1% were married-couple households, 18.5% were households with a male householder and no spouse or partner present, and 31.5% were households with a female householder and no spouse or partner present. About 30.7% of all households were made up of individuals and 16.1% had someone living alone who was 65 years of age or older.

There were 1,431 housing units, of which 20.6% were vacant. The homeowner vacancy rate was 2.9% and the rental vacancy rate was 10.2%.

Racial composition as of the 2020 census
Race	Number	Percent
White	1,847	63.5%
Black or African American	243	8.4%
American Indian and Alaska Native	28	1.0%
Asian	6	0.2%
Native Hawaiian and Other Pacific Islander	2	0.1%
Some other race	289	9.9%
Two or more races	492	16.9%
Hispanic or Latino (of any race)	1,096	37.7%

=== 2010 Census ===
As of the census of 2010, there were 3,124 people, 1,254 households, and 802 families residing in the city. The population density was 524.3 per square mile (202/km^{2}). The 1,638 housing units averaged 274.9 per square mile (106/km^{2}). The racial makeup of the city was 77.1% White, 8.5% African American, 0.8% Native American, 0.3% Asian, 10.1% from other races, and 3.0% from two or more races. Hispanics or Latinos of any race were 32.4% of the population.

Of the 1,254 households, 25.6% had children under the age of 18 living with them, 44.1% were married couples living together, 14.5% had a female householder with no husband present, and 36.0% were not families. About 31.3% of all households were made up of individuals, and 16.1% had someone living alone who was 65 years of age or older. The average household size was 2.39 and the average family size was 3.01. In the city, the population was distributed as 24.3% under the age of 18, 6.7% from 18 to 24, 19.5% from 25 to 44, 28.4% from 45 to 64, and 21.1% who were 65 years of age or older. The median age was 44.5 years. For every 100 females, there were 90.9 males. For every 100 females age 18 and over, there were 85.5 males.

The median income for a household in the city was $32,441, and for a family was $40,801. The per capita income for the city was $18,971. About 14.6% of families and 29.5% of the population were below the poverty line, including 41.9% of those under age 18 and 13.6% of those age 65 or over.

== Education ==
The city is served by the Stamford Independent School District and is home to the Stamford High School Bulldogs.

=== Public library ===
Of the 32 original Carnegie libraries built in Texas, Stamford Carnegie Library is one of only four that remain as libraries, and one of 13 that survive.

== Texas Cowboy Reunion ==
The first annual Texas Cowboy Reunion was held on June 28, 1930. It was established as a tribute to Texas cowboys, to preserve their traditions, and to lift the Depression-era morale. The first year was a success, as over 12,000 attendees watched three days of calf roping, bronco riding, steer riding, and the rodeo's first exhibition of wild-cow milking. The Old Timers' Association, a group composed of retired cowboys, was formed for historical commemoration.

Will Rogers made one of his last public appearances at the Texas Cowboy Reunion in 1935, less than two months before he died. In 1937, when rural West Texas was at its most populous, a record 70,000 visitors made their way to the event. Wild-cow milking was not Stamford's only contribution to modern rodeo events. Subsequent years had the creation of double mugging, a staple of Texas rodeos and ranch rodeo competitions. The worldwide phenomenon of barrel racing was modernized in Stamford, where the now-ubiquitous cloverleaf pattern was first used. In 1940, the American Quarter Horse Association held its first show at the Texas Cowboy Reunion. With a contestant roster made up primarily of working cowboys and regular folks, the event came to be billed as the "world's largest amateur rodeo". In the 1948 United States Senate election in Texas, candidate Coke Stevenson participated in the event and rode down the street on horseback, which won him many cheers.

Today, the event is held for four days each year around July 4 at the Texas Cowboy Reunion Grounds in Stamford. Annual events include a grand parade, four rodeo performances, a matched horse race, ropings, chuckwagon and barbecue cookoffs, daily barbecue meals, a Western art show and sale, fiddling and poetry performances, and dances.

== Culture ==
=== Elvis Presley ===
Elvis Presley performed at the Roundup Hall on the Texas Cowboy Reunion grounds on Friday, April 15, 1955. Earlier that evening, Elvis performed a stage show at the Stamford High School auditorium. Just over two months later, Elvis performed at the Roundup Hall on Friday, June 17, 1955.

=== Museum ===
The Museum of the West Texas Frontier celebrates the area's ranching heritage by showcasing original paintings and prints by noted cowboy artists, farm and ranch artifacts from the early 20th century, antique furnishings, period clothing, and a chuck wagon.

== Economy ==
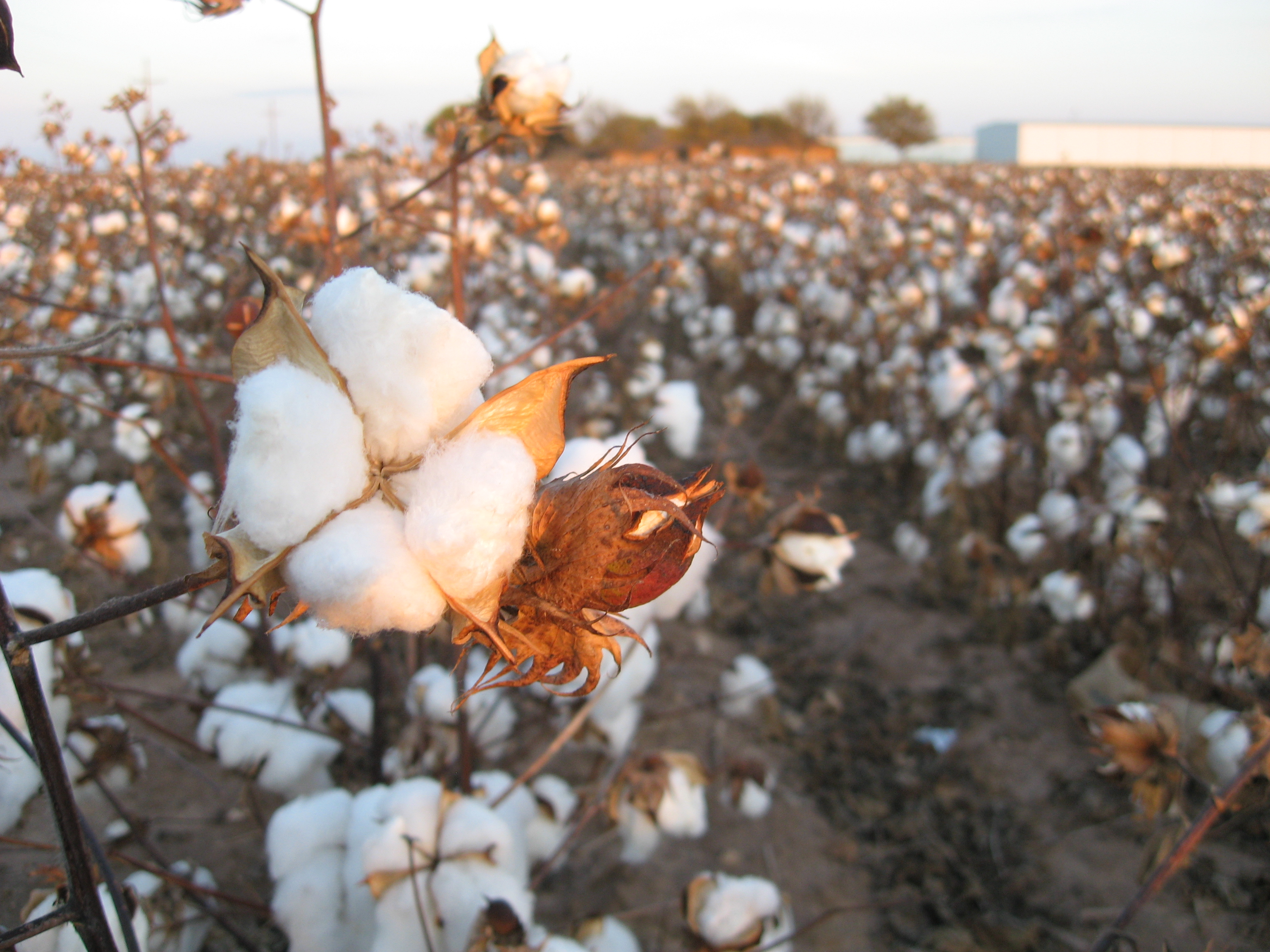

The economy of Stamford is based largely on education, healthcare, and agriculture.

Many thousands of acres of arable farmland surround the city, the majority of which is used to cultivate upland cotton. A cotton gin is in Stamford, and several more are within 8 miles (13 km) of the city. Other businesses include a cotton delinting plant, cotton compress, cottonseed oil mill, clothing factory, and grain elevator.

== Health care ==
Stamford Memorial Hospital is a 25-bed, acute-care hospital and health clinic. The hospital was originally established in 1910 as Stamford Sanitarium, and was the only hospital in the area until 1924, with the construction of Hendrick Hospital in Abilene.

== Media ==
=== Newspapers ===
Stamford has two weekly newspapers:

- The Stamford American
- The Stamford Star

=== Radio ===
- KVRP (AM) 1400 AM "The River" (Christian Contemporary)
- KLGD 106.9 FM "The Country Giant" (Classic Country)

== Major highways ==
- US 277
- SH 6
- SH 92
- SH 283

== Notable people ==
- Noel Brown, mid-20th century tennis player, was born in Stamford
- Pete Cole, former American football player, was born in Stamford
- Mike Compton, former MLB player for the 1970 Philadelphia Phillies
- Charles Coody, professional golfer, born in Stamford
- Norm Cox, former American football player, born in Stamford
- Frank Shelby Groner, president of the College of Marshall
- Bob Harrison, former defensive lineman in the National Football League
- William C. Holden, first director of the Museum of Texas Tech University
- Jeannie C. Riley, country singer with pop hit "Harper Valley PTA"
- James Washington, he had 76 receptions for 1,331 yards while at Stamford tx he also had 24 touchdowns he went to play for college football at Oklahoma State University he went to go play in the national football league for the Pittsburgh Steelers, Dallas Cowboys,New York Giants,New Orleans Saints,Indianapolis Colts,Atlanta Falcons
- John V. Roach, early proponent of the personal computer, born in Stamford
- Robert S. Strauss, Ambassador to Russia, Special Envoy for the Middle East was raised in Stamford
- Charles Stenholm, former congressman born in Stamford
- Joe S. Vásquez, Archbishop for the Diocese of Houston, born in Stamford

== See also ==
- National Register of Historic Places listings in Jones County, Texas
- List of museums in West Texas
- Lake Stamford
