= Lake Stamford =

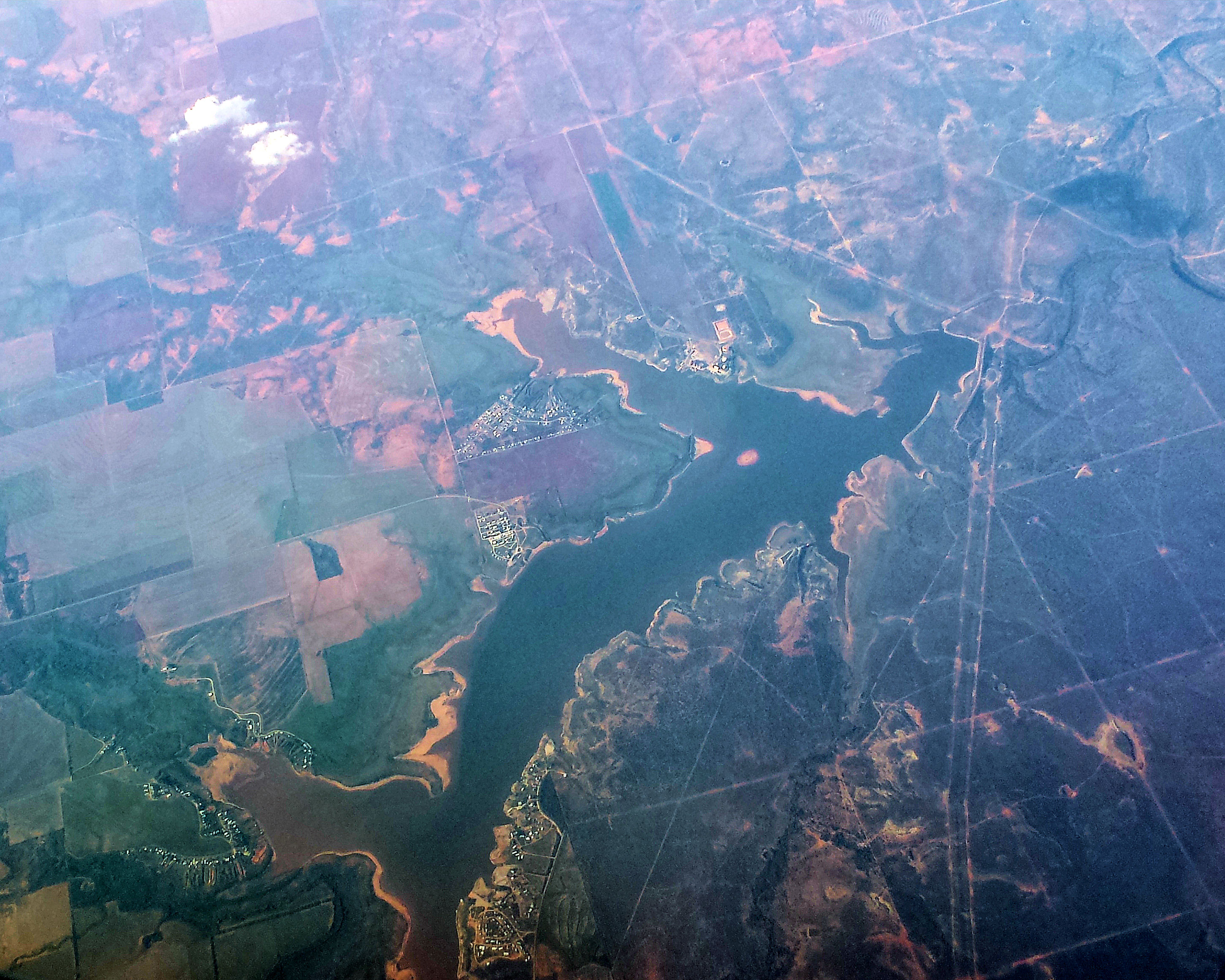
- Lake Stamford from 34,000 ft (10,000 m)

- Location within Texas Location within the United States

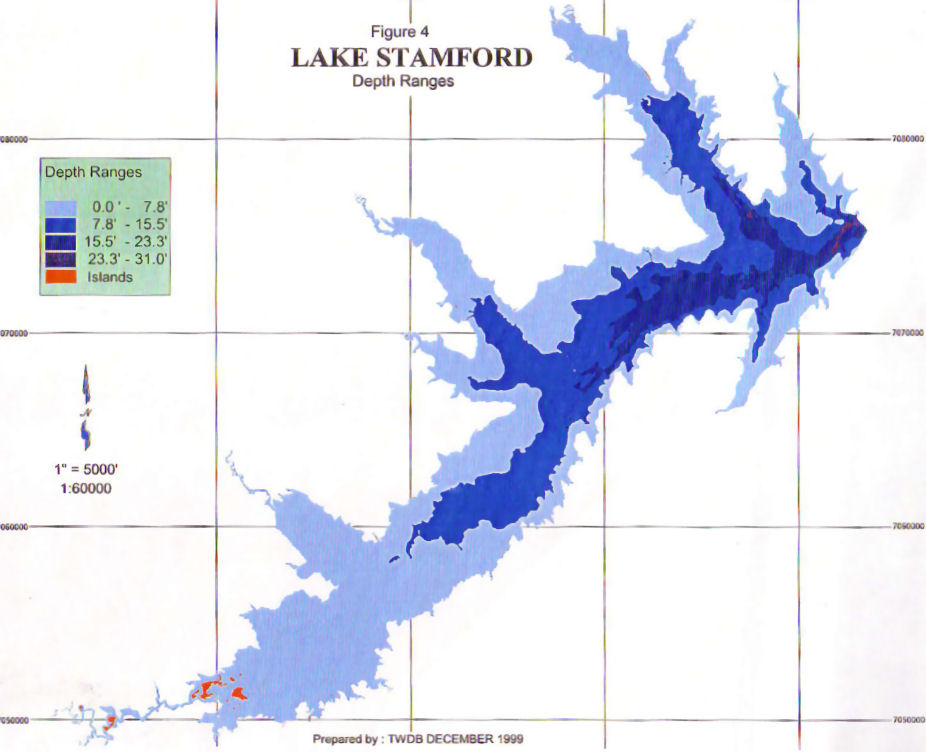
- Lake Stamford depth ranges
- Location: Haskell County, Texas
- Coordinates: 33.0444°N 99.6082°W
- Lake type: reservoir
- Primary inflows: Paint Creek
- Primary outflows: Paint Creek
- Catchment area: 368 sq mi (950 km^{2})
- Basin countries: United States
- Built: 1953
- Max. length: 7.2 mi (11.6 km)
- Max. width: 3.2 mi (5.1 km)
- Surface area: 5,125 acres (2,074 ha)
- Average depth: 11.5 ft (3.5 m)
- Max. depth: 45.3 ft (13.8 m)
- Water volume: 51,573 acre⋅ft (0.0636 km^{3})
- Residence time: 2.5 years
- Shore length^{1}: 63 mi (101 km)
- Surface elevation: 1,416.8 ft (431.8 m)
- Frozen: never
- ^{1} Shore length is not a well-defined measure.

Lake Stamford, a reservoir formed by Stamford Dam, is located 10 miles (16 km) northeast of Stamford, Texas, in southeastern Haskell County. The lake had a storage capacity in 1999 of 51,573 acre-feet (63,614,000 m^{3}) and drains an area of 368 square miles (950 km^{2}). Due to sedimentation, the estimated capacity as of 2013 is 50,061 acre⋅ft (61,749,000 m^{3}). The City of Stamford owns the lake and half the water rights to Lake Stamford, while American Electric Power (AEP) owns the other half. The city also owns, operates, and maintains associated Stamford Dam.

Lake Stamford serves as the municipal water source for Stamford and the small neighboring communities of Lueders, Ericksdahl, Paint Creek, Sagerton, Avoca, and Corinth. For the lake's 60-year history, water levels have retained significant importance to these communities, providing them their sole source of water. Several notable rain events occurred in 1978 and 2005, resulting in record water levels. Recreational activities include boating, fishing, waterskiing, jet-skiing, and camping. Two marinas are on the lake: Stamford Marina on the south shore, and Anchor Marina on the north.

== History ==
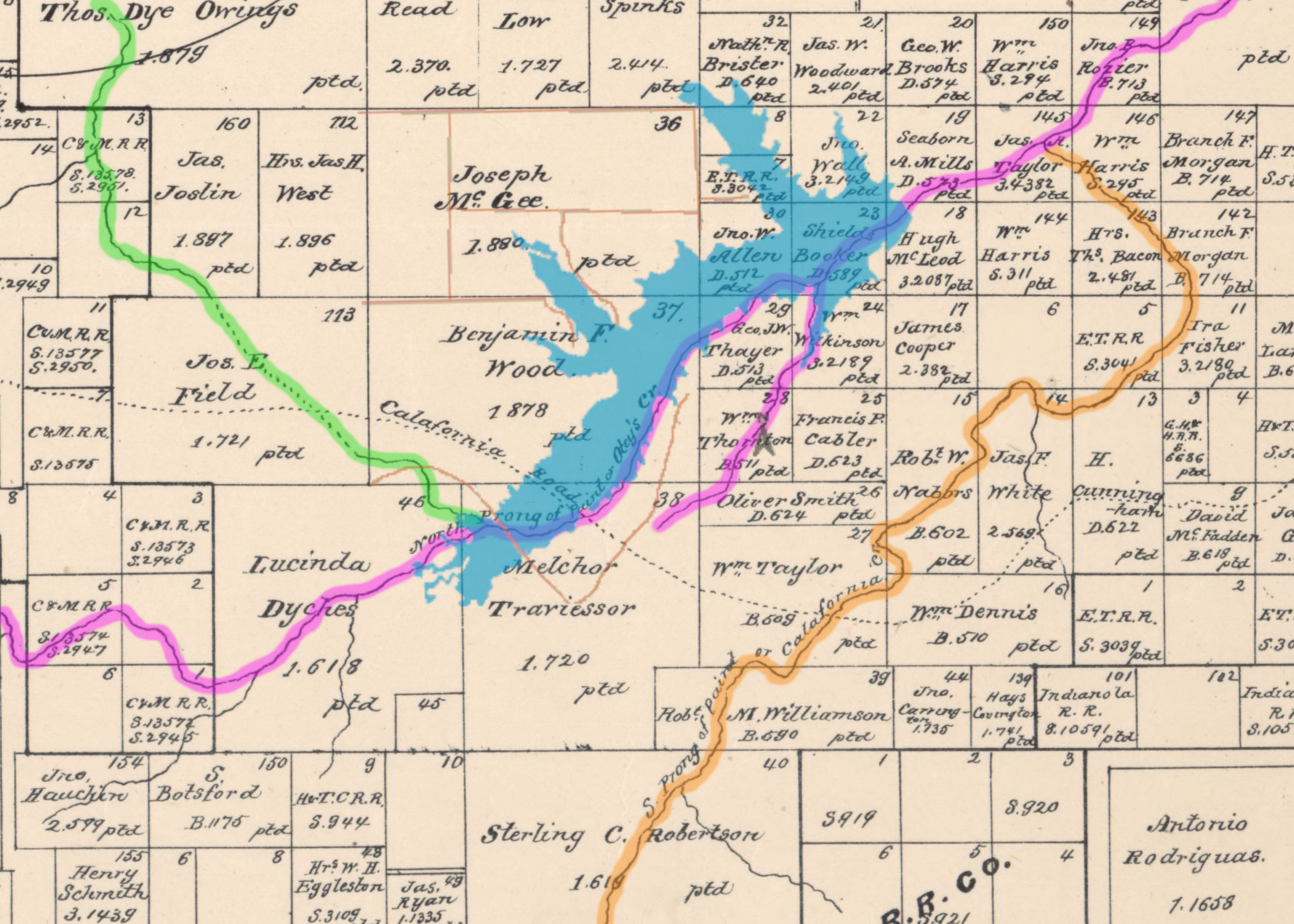
1879 Haskell County survey, Paint Creek (purple), Mule Creek (green), California Creek (orange), showing future location of Lake Stamford (blue)

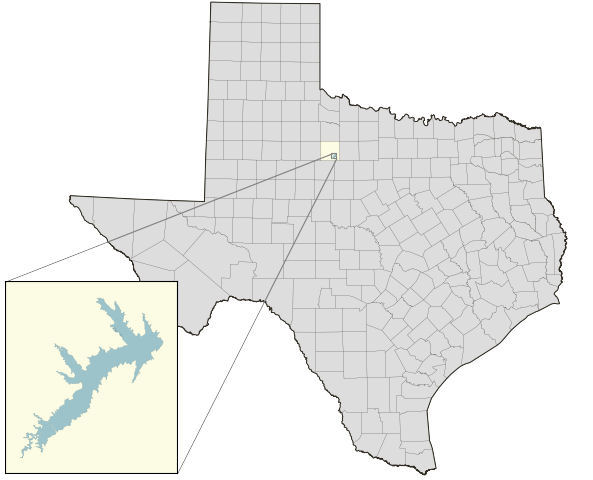
Lake Stamford location in Texas

Except for a period from 1919 to 1941, droughts, fairly common in the area, occurred in 1885–87, 1896, 1910, 1918, 1943, and 1952–56. People and animals relied primarily on natural springs. These springs and spring-fed lakes supported a wide variety of animals. Buffalo, turkey, and ducks were abundant, particularly before 1875 when the buffalo slaughter began in Haskell County. The mouth of Mule Creek is located about 0.25 mi (0.40 km) west of the FM 600 bridge as it crosses the lake on the north side. At the mouth of Mule Creek was located the Blue Hole Springs. Area residents obtained water from these springs, and in the 1880s, M O Ranch had cattle pens there. As the water table fell due to irrigation pumping, an alternative was necessary. When the lake is nearing capacity, this area of former springs is under Lake Stamford.

When the City of Stamford was formed in 1900, two small reservoirs were built close to the city. Another was built in 1905, and a fourth was built in 1910, 5 miles west of the city. These small reservoirs grew insufficient for the growing town, and in 1919, the Clear Fork Brazos River was dammed just southeast of Lueders to form Lake Penick. This lake was originally 7 mi (11 km) long and held 3,096 acre⋅ft (0.0038 km^{3}), and initially proved an adequate supply for the city, but by 1927, the capacity of Lake Penick had dropped by a third to 2,126 acre⋅ft (0.0026 km^{3}) caused by sedimentation from severe erosion upstream. By 1949, the city's water supply had become a significant concern for mayor A.C. Humphrey. Prospective area locations were surveyed, and all were rejected except for a site on Paint Creek.

=== Construction ===
Construction for Lake Stamford and Stamford Dam started July 14, 1951, and was completed in March 1953. Deliberate impoundment began in June 1953. Stamford Dam impounds Paint Creek, but numerous other creeks flow into the lake. Horse, Buffalo, and Mule Creeks all flow directly into the lake and are part of the watershed. The design engineer for the project was Freese and Nichols and the general contractor was L. & S. Contractor. The dam is an earthfill embankment 3,600 feet (1,100 m) long with a maximum height of 78 feet (24 m). The estimated cost of the dam was $289,365.00. The top of Stamford Dam is at an elevation of 1,434.0 feet (437.1 m) and is 15.2 feet (4.6 m) above the spillway. The service spillway is 900 feet (270 m) north of the dam, where the uncontrolled spillway crest is 100 feet (30 m) in length at an elevation of 1,416.8 feet (431.8 m). Lake Stamford is considered "full" (maximum desired capacity) when the lake's water level is 1,416.8 feet (431.8 m) above mean sea level.

=== California Creek diversion project ===
At the height of the drought in 2000, a water diversion project on California Creek was built to divert future rainfall from the creek to Lake Stamford, in an effort to supplement the lake's primary inflow of Paint Creek. The project consisted of a channel dam, pump station, and pipeline, and cost an estimated $6.3 million. California Creek runs from west of Hamlin to north of Corinth and Avoca, and then turns northeast and runs parallel to Lake Stamford at a distance around 2.5 mi (4.0 km). California Creek does not flow directly into Lake Stamford, but meets with Paint Creek one mile downstream (east) of Stamford Dam. The drainage area for California Creek is 478 sq mi (1,240 km^{2}), which supplements Lake Stamford's watershed of 368 sq mi (950 km^{2}). Water is only diverted at sporadic intervals when there is sufficient flow in California Creek.

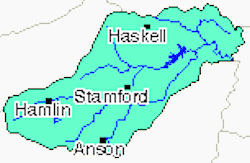
Approximate Lake Stamford watershed (including California Creek diversion)

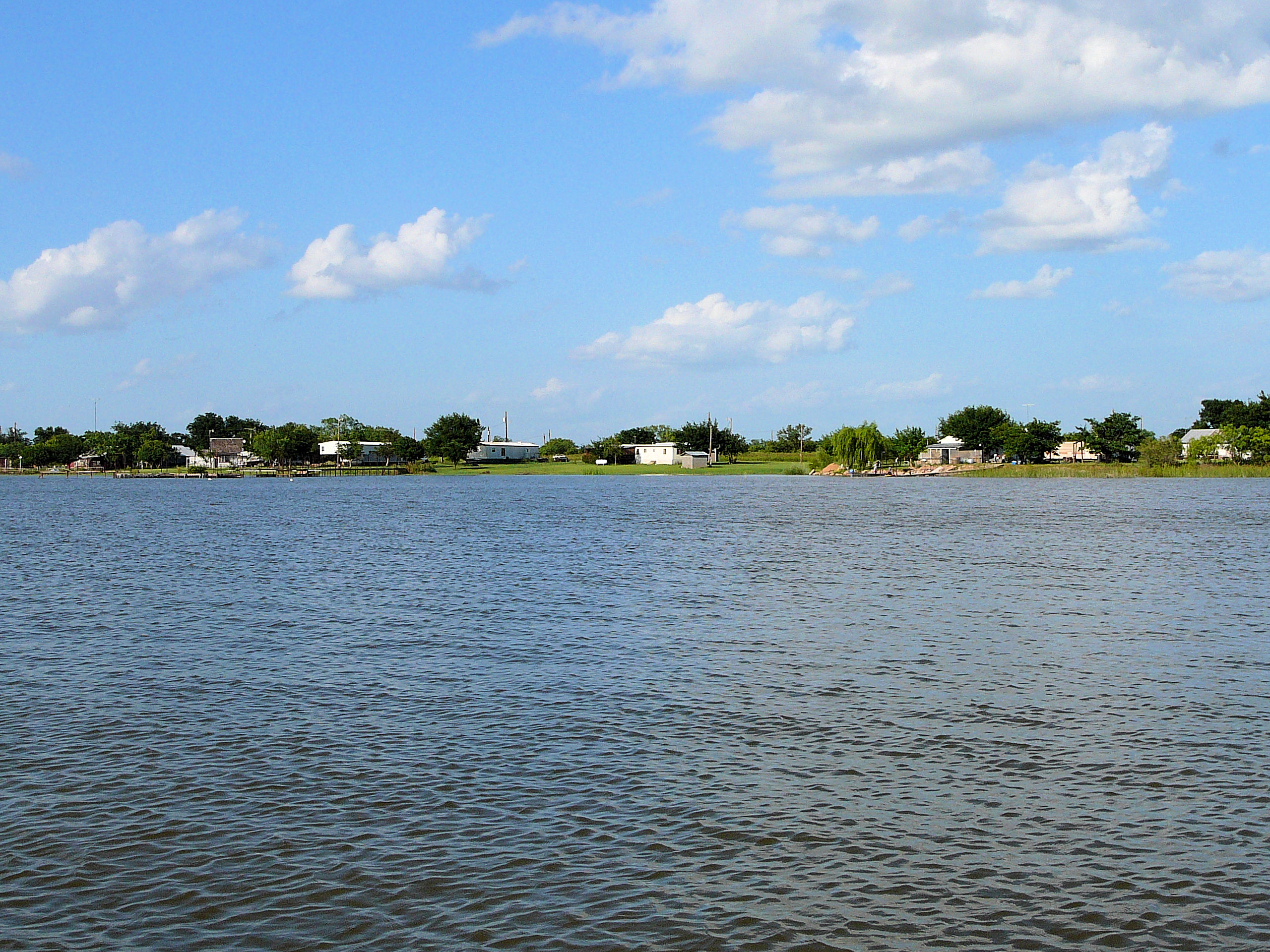
Lake Stamford, June 2007, at capacity

== Water levels ==
Water levels in Lake Stamford fluctuate significantly, primarily due to extended periods of drought. These droughts steadily reduce the lake level throughout the year, and have ultimately resulted in two occasions when the lake was less than 20% full. The first drought event occurred in the late 1990s until November 2000. The second prolonged drought began July 2013 and ended June 2015. These droughts are usually only resolved after a substantially prolonged period of heavy rains. The lake commonly reaches full capacity with the help of a tropical system moving up from the Gulf of Mexico, as occurred in August 1978 with Tropical Storm Amelia and in August 2007 with Tropical Storm Erin. The amount of water is a key concern for area residents, for whom the lake is their sole source of water.

=== Record low levels ===
Since impoundment in June 1953 and initial filling, the lowest water level ever in Lake Stamford occurred on April 13, 2015. The lake was 17.42 feet (5.31 m) below conservation pool elevation, held 5,013 acre-feet (6,183,000 m^{3}) of water, and was 9.7% full.

Two prior periods of drought produced what were, at the time, record lows. The second-lowest water level occurred on four days in October 2000. On October 20, 2000, the lake was 15.8 feet (4.8 m) below conservation pool elevation, held 6,760 acre-feet (8,340,000 m^{3}) of water, and was 13.1% full. The third-lowest lake level occurred on August 3, 1978, when the lake was 27.7% full.

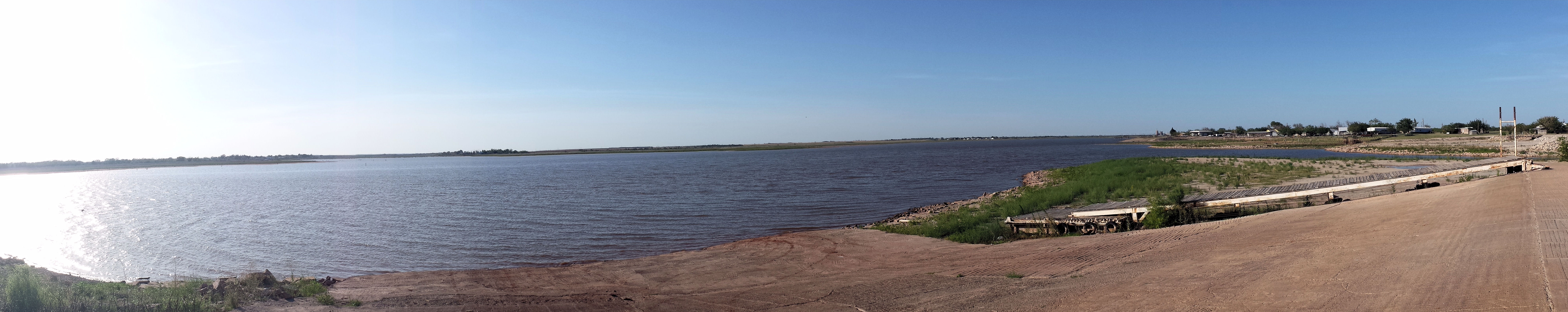
Lake Stamford (boat ramp and dock), June 2013, 21% full

=== Record high levels and cresting events ===
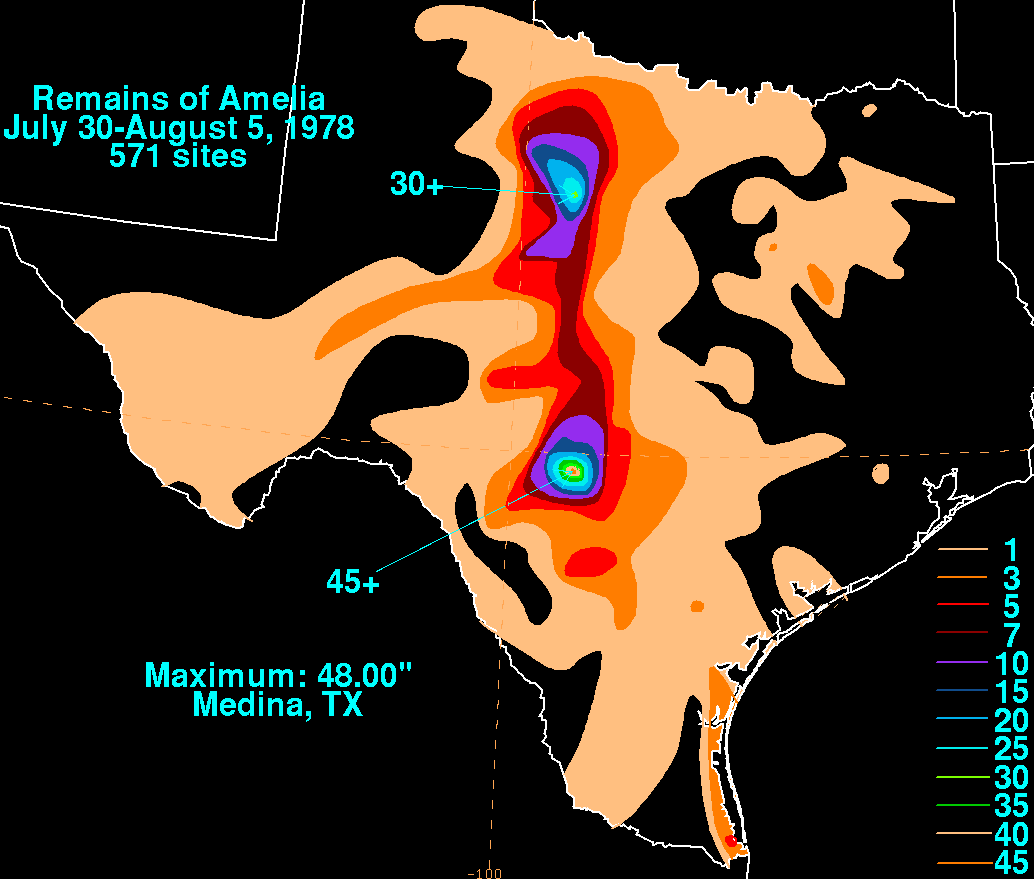
Rainfall from Amelia in 1978

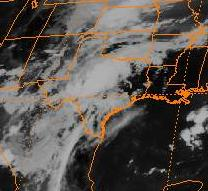
Remnants of Amelia, August 3, 1978

==== August 1978 ====
Two days after recording its third-lowest level, the lake surged to its second-highest level ever. On August 5, 1978, the water in Lake Stamford was 5.38 feet (1.64 m) above the spillway. This represents an increase over 15.2 feet (4.6 m) in less than 48 hours, the lake's fastest-ever change in elevation. In fact, the rise was so fast. it took some three hours for the lake to simply fill to capacity by increasing almost 10 feet (3.0 m). This was due to remnants of Tropical Storm Amelia. Though Amelia was weak and poorly organized, as it dissipated over Texas, it cause severe flooding.

On August 4, 1978, Stamford received its daily all-time record rainfall of 8.22 inches (209 mm). That same day, 29.05 inches (738 mm) fell on nearby Albany, the record daily rainfall for the entire state of Texas. Also, the nearby California Creek had a peak discharge of 40,000 cubic feet (1,100 m^{3}) per second and a flood stage height of 31.0 feet (9.4 m), the highest since at least 1897. President Carter declared Haskell county, among counties in Texas, a disaster area. The lake receded down to the spillway by August 19, 1978.

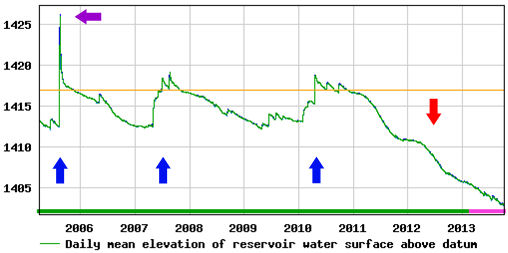
Lake Stamford elevation changes from 2005 to 2013 (green), record high (purple), high levels (blue), low level (red)

==== August 2005 ====
Since the drought in 2000, the lake has reached (and exceeded) capacity on three occasions. The first event happened very rapidly when, between August 13 and 16, 2005, the lake rose 13.53 feet (4.12 m). During the month of August 2005, the City of Stamford received 10.64 inches (270 mm) of rain. Most of the rain was concentrated during the aforementioned four days, with the city receiving 4.52 inches (115 mm) on August 14, 2005, alone. On August 17, 2005, these rains put the lake overcapacity by 9.38 feet (2.86 m) with the surface elevation of 1,426.18 ft (434.70 m) and resulted in the record high water level for Lake Stamford. This caused extensive flooding to more than 340 homes, resulting in a disaster area declaration by Governor Perry. Water levels dropped back below the spillway on November 28, 2005.

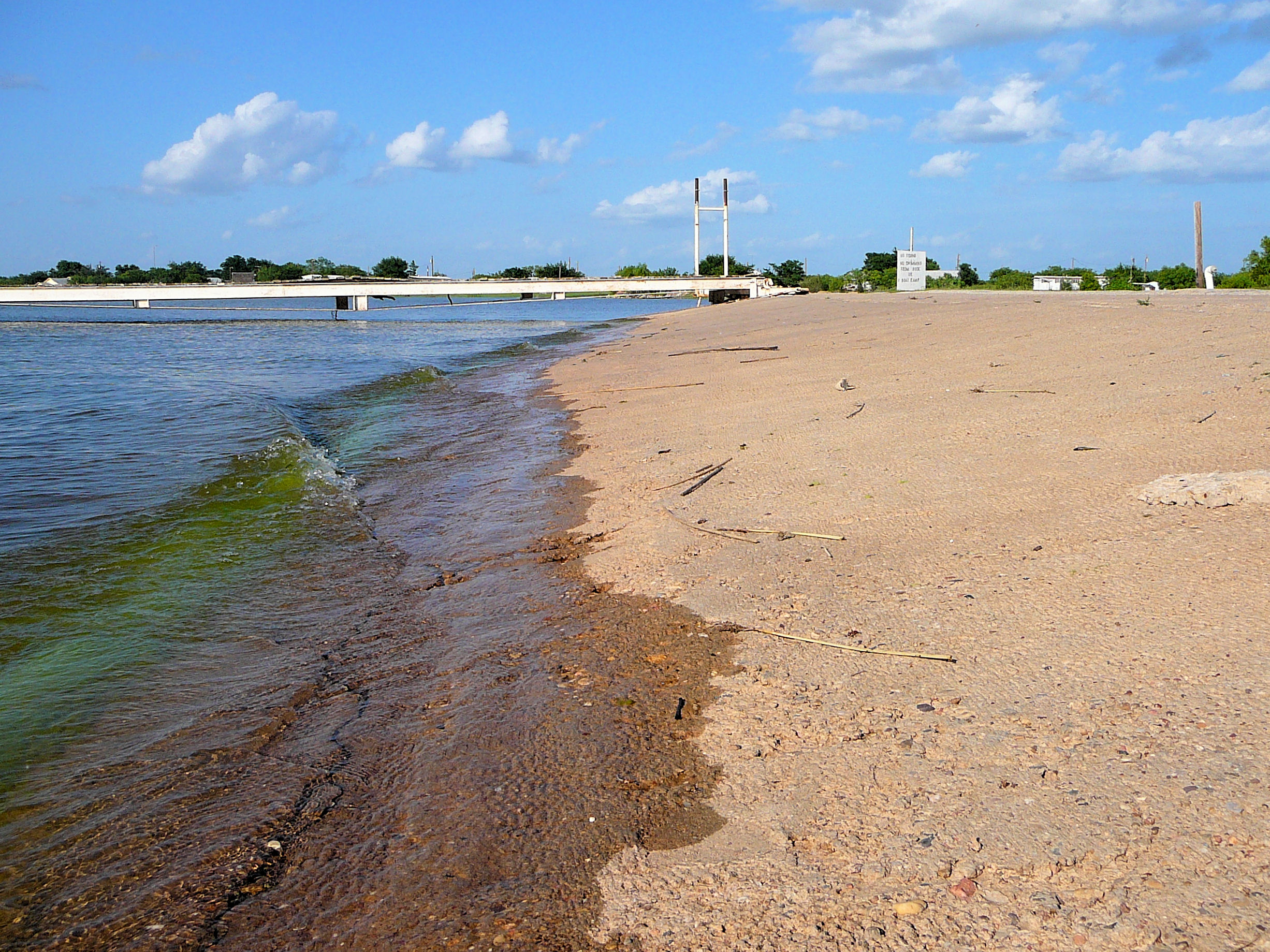
Lake Stamford (boat ramp), June 2007, at capacity

==== June and August 2007 ====
The second event was not so much an event as a period. The preponderance of this period's rains were north and west of Stamford, near Haskell and Hamlin. Starting in late April 2007, the area received enough rain to raise the lake by about 4.4 feet (1.3 m) by the first week of June, filling the lake just shy of capacity. Then in June 2007, Stamford received 6.37 inches (162 mm) of rain and by July 3, the lake was overcapacity by about 1.6 feet (0.49 m). As the lake was dropping back down to capacity (less than 4 inches (100 mm) above the spillway), Stamford received an additional 4.85 inches (123 mm) of rain on August 18, 2007, from Tropical Storm Erin. The lake crested on August 21 to 2.35 feet (0.72 m) above capacity, and then dropped back below the spillway on November 14, 2007.

==== April 2010 ====
Beginning the last week of January 2010, the area received two to three times its average monthly precipitation, and February had notable snowfall. This increased the lake by just under 2.5 feet (0.76 m) by mid-March.

Then on April 17, 2010, Stamford received 4.65 inches (118 mm) of rain and a total of 6.38 inches (162 mm) for the month. By April 21, lake levels crested at 1.98 feet (0.60 m) above capacity, having increased by 3.49 feet (1.06 m). Additional rain events in June and September each moved the lake overcapacity again by less than 1 foot (0.30 m). Water levels eventually dropped below the spillway on December 5, 2010, the last time Lake Stamford was full until July 10, 2015.

Lake Stamford record water levels
High	Over Spillway	Date
1	9.38 ft	August 17, 2005
2	5.38 ft	August 5, 1978
Low	% full	Date
1	9.7%	April 13, 2015
2	13.1%	October 20, 2000
3	27.7%	August 3, 1978

== Sale of water to Tenaska ==
On July 12, 2011, the Stamford city council approved the sale of all "excess water" from Lake Stamford for use in Tenaska Energy's Trailblazer Energy Center in Nolan County, Texas. No public debate was held before the decision was made. This sale of water was fairly contentious among many area residents, who were not as confident as the city council that the lake could support such a significant new drain like a large power plant. According to the contract, the exact amount of water to be taken can be adjusted according to a redefinition of the "safe yield", but is currently estimated to be 773 acre⋅ft (953,000 m^{3}) per year. The length of the contract (effective July 18, 2011) is either 30 years (starting when the plant begins operation) or 45 years from the date of the contract, whichever is earliest. Tenaska also has at its option two 10-year contract extensions, plus three additional 10-year extensions subject to approval of Stamford (which "shall not be unreasonably withheld").

Tenaska and its use of water is not subject to any water-conservation or drought-contingency plans enacted by Stamford. In addition to the 773 acre⋅ft (953,000 m^{3}), Stamford will sell Tenaska all of its effluent water of about 250,000 gallons/day (280 acre ft/year). The proposed coal-fired power plant would be located 37 miles southwest of Stamford and 47 miles southwest of Lake Stamford.

On June 21, 2013, Tenaska cancelled their proposed Trailblazer coal-fired power plant. While Stamford would have provided the majority of the project's water, Tenaska was unable to find a secondary source of water.

== Power plant ==
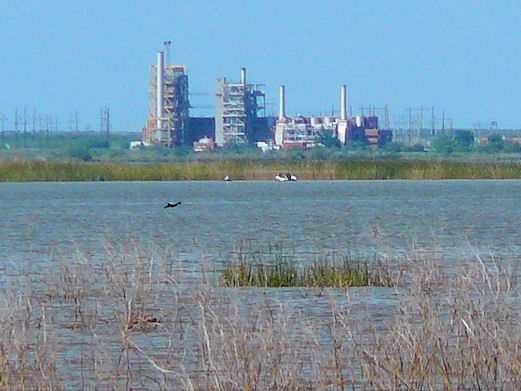
Paint Creek Power Plant

AEP (formerly West Texas Utilities) owns a gas-fired electric generating power plant located at Lake Stamford. The plant has a generating capacity of 218 MW. When operating, water is pumped directly from the lake for industrial (cooling) purposes. The plant was put into inactive status and mothballed in September 2002.

AEP holds half the water rights in Lake Stamford. AEP's water supply contract with Stamford expires September 16, 2041, but can be extended by AEP for one additional 10-year term.

== Fish species ==
Lake Stamford provides angling opportunities with these species:

Bass

- Largemouth Bass
- White Bass

Catfish

- Blue Catfish
- Channel Catfish

Crappie and others

- Crappie
- Sunfish

== See also ==
- Tropical Storm Amelia (1978)#Northern Texas
- Floods in the United States: 1901–2000#Tropical Storm Amelia floods of August 1978
- 2010–13 Southern United States drought

== Gallery ==
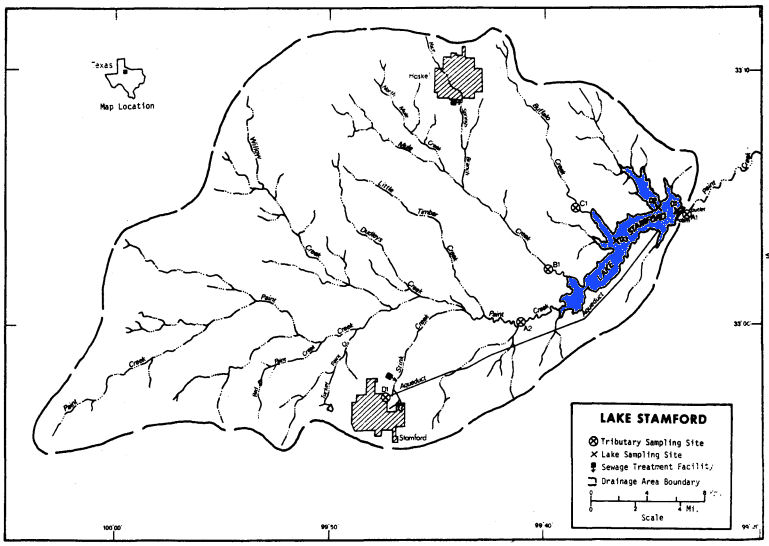
Lake Stamford watershed, without California Creek diversion

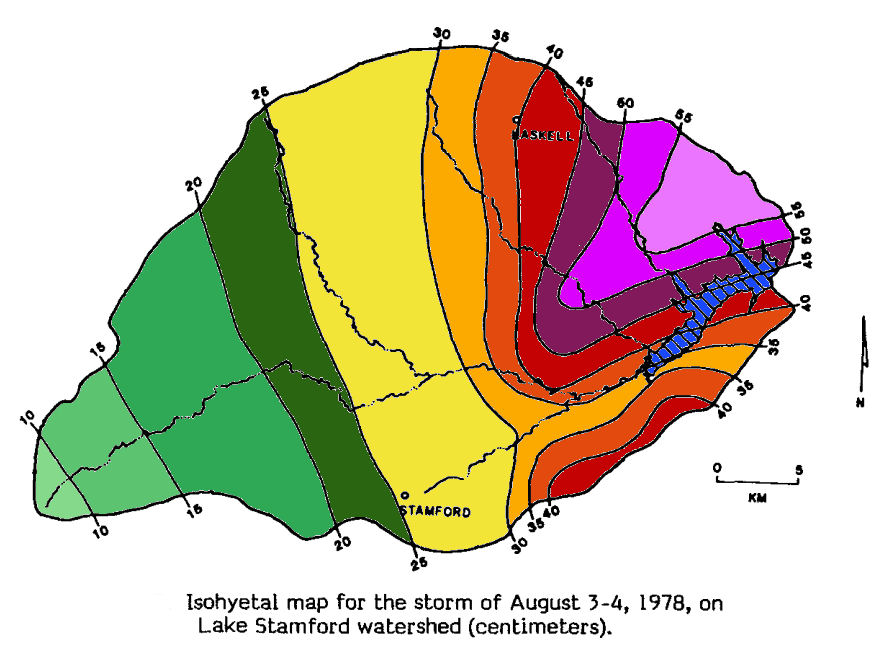
Rainfall amounts (cm) on Lake Stamford watershed from Tropical Storm Amelia, August 3-4, 1978

Tropical Storm Amelia, August 1-4, 1970
