= Hawley, Texas =

City in Jones County, Texas, United States

- City
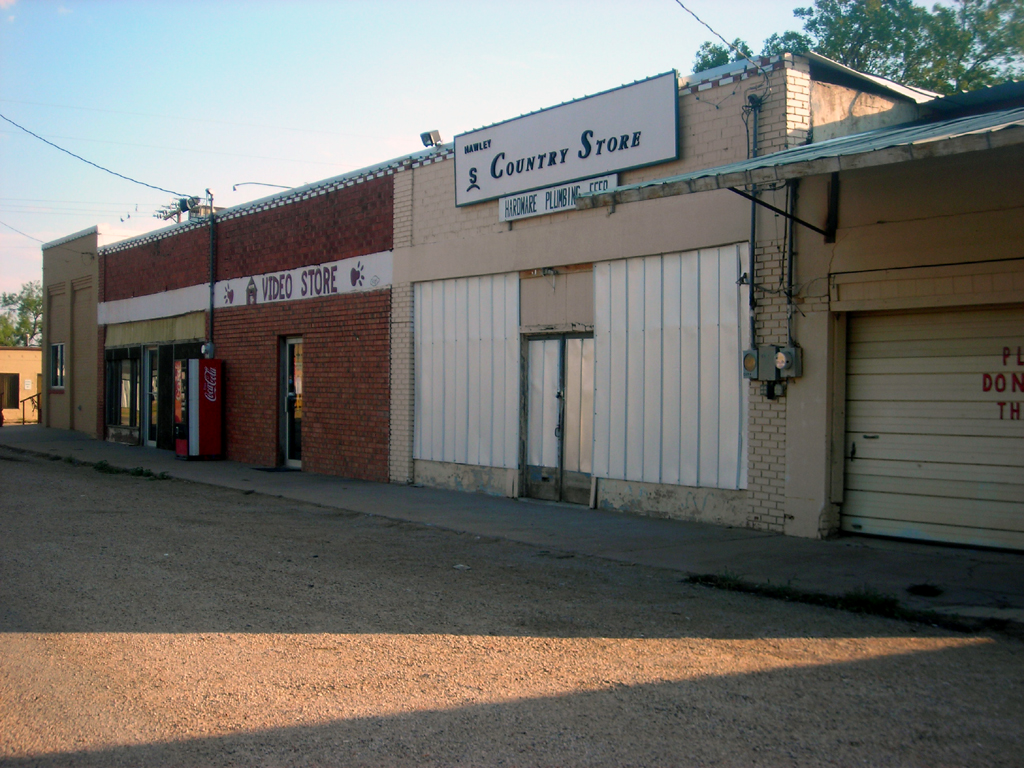
- Street in Hawley, September 2011

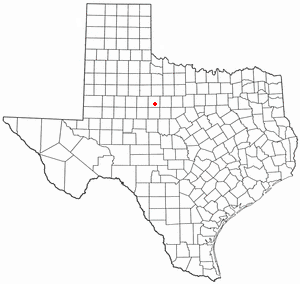
- Location of Hawley, Texas

- Coordinates: 32°36′13″N 99°48′40″W
- Country: United States
- State: Texas
- County: Jones

Area
  - Total: 2.94 sq mi (7.61 km^{2})
  - Land: 2.93 sq mi (7.59 km^{2})
  - Water: 0.0077 sq mi (0.02 km^{2})
- Elevation: 1,631 ft (497 m)

Population (2020)
  - Total: 545
  - Density: 186/sq mi (71.8/km^{2})
- Time zone: UTC-6 (Central (CST))
  - Summer (DST): UTC-5 (CDT)
- ZIP code: 79525
- Area code: 325
- FIPS code: 48-32840
- GNIS feature ID: 2410719
- Website: www.cityofhawley.com

Hawley is a city in Jones County, Texas, United States. Its population was 545 at the 2020 census. Hawley is part of the Abilene metropolitan area.

== History ==
The community is named for Congressman Robert B. Hawley.

On evening of May 2, 2024, a strong EF3 tornado struck southwest of Hawley. One of the storm chasers following it, Freddy McKinney, happened to witness the tornado destroy the home of the Lambert family: Husband and father Wes, wife and mother Kasey, 7-year old son Lane, 4-year old daughter Allie, and their two dogs Millie and Scout. When he investigated the aftermath, the Lamberts had somehow miraculously survived their home's destruction after taking a direct hit from the tornado, but were seriously injured. Freddy took it upon himself to drive them all the way to Hendrick Medical Center in Abilene to get medical attention, and support a GoFundMe fundraiser to help them rebuild their lives after the tornado.

== Geography ==
Hawley is located in southeastern Jones County. U.S. Routes 83 and 277, running concurrently, pass through the southwestern side of the city, leading northwest 11 miles (18 km) to Anson, the county seat, and southeast 13 miles (21 km) to Abilene.

According to the United States Census Bureau, Hawley has a total area of 2.9 square miles (7.6 km^{2}), of which 0.01 square miles (0.02 km^{2}), or 0.25%, is covered by water. The Clear Fork of the Brazos River flows through the city, south of the center.

=== Climate ===
The climate in this area is characterized by hot, dry summers and generally mild to cool winters. According to the Köppen climate classification, Hawley has a humid subtropical climate, Cfa on climate maps.

== Demographics ==
=== 2020 census ===
As of the 2020 census, Hawley had a population of 545 and a median age of 38.7 years; 23.1% of the residents were under 18 and 16.3% were 65 or older. For every 100 females, there were 88.6 males, and for every 100 females 18 and over, there were 87.9 males age 18 and over.

Of the 216 households in Hawley, 30.1% had children under 18 living in them, 50.0% were married-couple households, 16.7% were households with a male householder and no spouse or partner present, and 29.6% were households with a female householder and no spouse or partner present. About 25.5% of all households were made up of individuals, and 8.3% had someone living alone who was 65 or older.

The city had 242 housing units, of which 10.7% were vacant. The homeowner vacancy rate was 2.7% and the rental vacancy rate was 8.7%.

None of the residents lived in urban areas, while 100.0% lived in rural areas.

Racial composition as of the 2020 census
Race	Number	Percentage
White	489	89.7%
Black or African American	2	0.4%
American Indian and Alaska Native	6	1.1%
Some other race	9	1.7%
Two or more races	39	7.2%
Hispanic or Latino (of any race)	34	6.2%

=== 2000 census ===
Historical population
Census	Pop.	Note	%±
1980	679		—
1990	606		−10.8%
2000	646		6.6%
2010	634		−1.9%
2020	545		−14.0%
U.S. Decennial Census

As of the census of 2000, 646 people, 239 households, and 184 families resided in the city. The population density was 219.7 inhabitants per square mile (84.8/km^{2}). The 264 housing units averaged 89.8/sq mi (34.7/km^{2}). The racial makeup of the city was 96.44% White, 0.15% African American, 0.93% Asian, 1.70% from other races, and 0.77% from two or more races. Hispanics or Latinos of any race were 4.18% of the population.

Of the 239 households, 39.3% had children under 18 living with them, 63.6% were married couples living together, 9.2% had a female householder with no husband present, and 22.6% were not families. About 20.1% of all households were made up of individuals, and 10.9% had someone living alone who was 65 or older. The average household size was 2.70, and the average family size was 3.11.

In the city, the age distribution was 30.7% under 18, 7.3% from 18 to 24, 28.5% from 25 to 44, 22.3% from 45 to 64, and 11.3% who were 65 years of age or older. The median age was 34 years. For every 100 females there were 96.4 males. For every 100 females age 18 and over, there were 94.8 males.

The median income in the city for a household was $31,771 and for a family was $36,625. Males had a median income of $25,893 versus $21,071 for females. The per capita income for the city was $14,879. About 9.3% of families and 13.0% of the population were below the poverty line, including 18.8% of those under 18 and 15.9% of those 65 or over.

== Education ==
The city is served by the Hawley Independent School District, in Hawley.

== See also ==
- List of municipalities in Texas
