= Larry Cox (American football) =

American football player (born 1943)

No. 66, 77, 75
- Positions: Defensive tackle, defensive end

Personal information
- Born: November 12, 1943 (age 82); Anson, Texas, U.S.
- Listed height: 6 ft 3 in (1.91 m)
- Listed weight: 255 lb (116 kg)

Career information
- High school: Anson
- College: Abilene Christian
- AFL draft: 1966: 10th round, 85th overall pick

Career history
- Denver Broncos (1966–1968); Las Vegas Cowboys (1969); Norfolk Neptunes (1970)

Awards and highlights
- First-team Little All-American (1965)
- Stats at Pro Football Reference

Lawrence Donald Cox (born November 12, 1943) is an American former professional football defensive lineman who played for the Denver Broncos of the American Football League (AFL). He played college football for the Abilene Christian Wildcats and was selected by the Broncos in the tenth round of the 1966 AFL draft.

== Early life ==
Lawrence Donald Cox was born on November 12, 1943, in Anson, Texas. He played high school football at Anson High School. He earned third-team all-state honors at end as a senior in 1962 while serving as a team captain and also spending some time at fullback. Cox was also an All-District center on the basketball team and averaged 11.4 points per game.

== College career ==
Cox originally committed to Texas Tech. In March 1962, he switched his commitment to Abilene Christian College, where he played college football for the Wildcats. He made the traveling team for the 1962 season. Cox garnered All-Southland Conference recognition in both 1964 (at tackle) and 1965 (at defensive tackle). He was named a first-team Little All-American in 1965 at tackle.

== Professional career ==
Cox was selected by the Denver Broncos in the 10th round, with the 85th overall pick, of the 1966 AFL draft. He was waived/injured on August 28, 1966, after his motorcycle skidded on the road. Cox was "badly cut up" but suffered no serious internal injuries or broken bones. He reverted to injured reserve on August 29, and was activated on September 29. He played in 11 games, starting seven, for the Broncos during the 1966 season and posted 0.5 sacks. Cox appeared in 13 games, starting three, in 1967 and recorded 2.5 sacks. He played in nine games in 1968. He was released on September 9, 1969, before the start of the 1969 season.

Cox played for the Las Vegas Cowboys of the Continental Football League in 1969 and the Norfolk Neptunes of the Atlantic Coast Football League in 1970.
