= Paint Creek (Clear Fork Brazos River tributary) =

Paint Creek (Clear Fork Brazos River)

Location
- Country: United States
- State: Texas

Physical characteristics
- Source
  - location: Jones County
  - coordinates: 32°56′0″N 100°2′9″W
  - elevation: 1,690 ft (520 m)
- Mouth: Clear Fork Brazos River
  - location: Throckmorton County
  - coordinates: 33°3′7″N 99°22′21″W
  - elevation: 1,260 ft (380 m)
- Length: 53 mi (85 km)

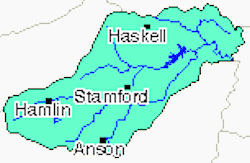
Paint Creek watershed

Paint Creek runs through Jones, Haskell, and Throckmorton counties, and is the main tributary of the Clear Fork Brazos River.

Lake Stamford is formed where Paint Creek is impounded by Stamford Dam. The lake's primary inflow (and outflow) is Paint Creek.

One mile past (east) of Stamford Dam is a site called Scott Crossing. This is where California Creek, Paint Creek's most significant tributary, flows into Paint Creek. California Creek is the site of a diversion project to move water to Lake Stamford.

The nearby town of Paint Creek, Texas, was named after this creek.

== See also ==
- List of rivers of Texas
