= Anson High School =

Anson High School may refer to:

== In the United States ==
- Anson High School (North Carolina), Wadesboro, North Carolina
- Anson High School (Texas), Anson, Texas
