= Nugent, Texas =

Unincorporated community in Texas, US

Coordinates: 32°41′38″N 99°40′03″W

Nugent is an unincorporated community in Jones County, Texas, United States. According to the Handbook of Texas, the community had an estimated population of 41 in 2000. It is part of the Abilene, Texas metropolitan statistical area.

The Lueders-Avoca Independent School District serves area students.

== Climate ==
The climate in this area is characterized by hot, humid summers and generally mild to cool winters. According to the Köppen climate classification, Nugent has a humid subtropical climate, Cfa on climate maps.
