= Dave Lince =

American football player (1944–2001)

No. 87
- Position: Tight end

Personal information
- Born: May 17, 1944; Fargo, ND, U.S.
- Died: December 29, 2001 (aged 57); Laguna Beach, CA, U.S.
- Listed height: 6 ft 7 in (2.01 m)
- Listed weight: 265 lb (120 kg)

Career information
- High school: Lincoln (ND)
- College: North Dakota
- NFL draft: 1966: 7th round, 99th overall pick

Career history
- Philadelphia Eagles (1966–1967)

Career NFL statistics
- Games played: 18
- Stats at Pro Football Reference

David Leroy Lince (May 17, 1944 – December 29, 2001) was an American professional football tight end who played for the Philadelphia Eagles of the National Football League (NFL).

== College career ==
Lince was named to the 1965 Little All-America college football team. He was inducted into the University of North Dakota Hall of fame in 1983 for his playing career there.
