= Jones County Courthouse (Texas) =

Courthouse building in Anson, Jones County, Texas

- U.S. National Register of Historic Places
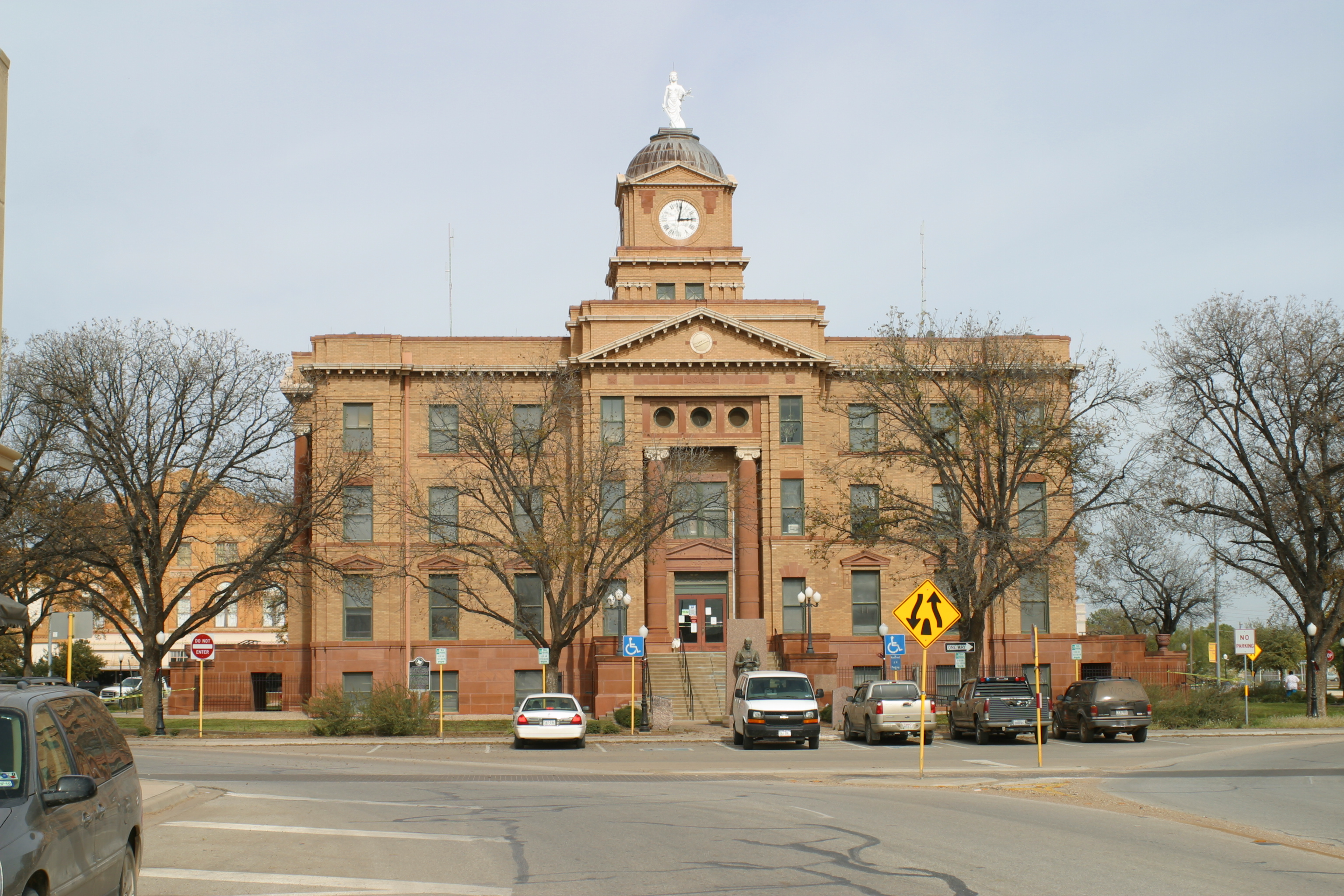
- Jones County Courthouse (2009)

- Location within Texas Location within the United States
- Interactive map showing the location of Jones County Courthouse
- Location: 1100 12th St., Anson, Texas
- Coordinates: 32°45′22″N 99°53′48″W
- Area: less than one acre
- Built: 1910
- Architect: Elmer George Withers
- Architectural style: Beaux-Arts
- NRHP reference No.: 03000330
- Added to NRHP: May 1, 2003

The Jones County Courthouse is a courthouse building in the town of Anson, Jones County, Texas. It was listed on the National Register of Historic Places in 2003. The building was designed by architect Elmer George Withers using a Beaux-Arts style It was completed in 1910.

The building was designated as a Recorded Texas Historic Landmark in 2000.

== Structure ==
The courthouse was built with Pecos red sandstone and brick, reflecting a Beaux-Arts style.
