= List of storms named Amelia =

The name Amelia has been used for one tropical cyclone in the North Atlantic Ocean and two tropical cyclones to the north of Australia.

Atlantic Ocean:

- Tropical Storm Amelia (1978), a weak tropical storm that made landfall in Texas; severe flooding killed 33 people and caused $20 million (1978 USD) in damage

Australian region:

- Cyclone Amelia (1975), formed in the Arafura Sea and made landfall in the Northern Territory
- Cyclone Amelia (1981), formed in the Gulf of Carpentaria and passed over the northernmost part of the Northern Territory before dissipating in the Timor Sea
