= Tropical Storm Amelia (1978) =

Atlantic tropical storm in 1978

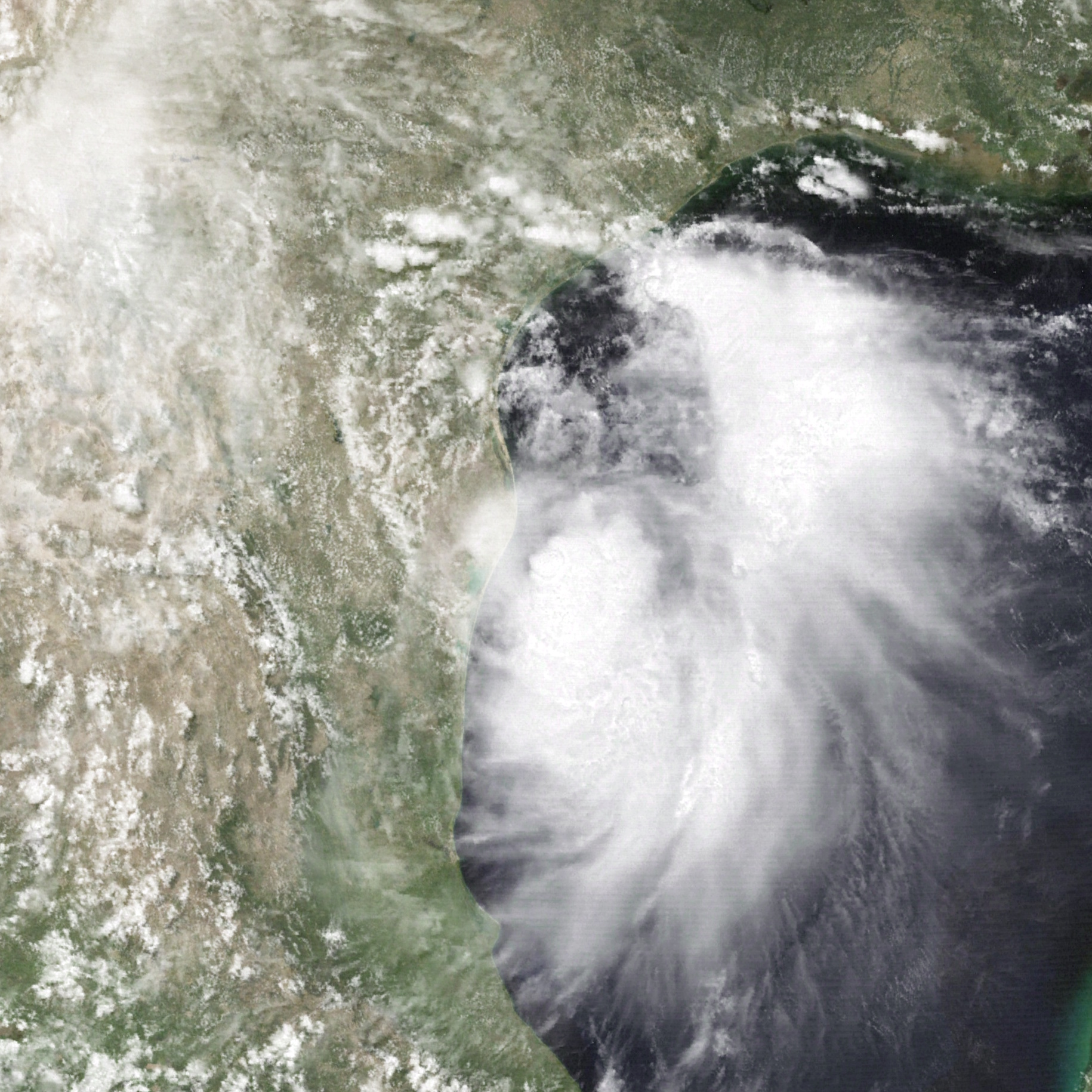
- Amelia as a newly-formed tropical depression on July 30

Meteorological history
- Formed: July 30, 1978
- Dissipated: August 1, 1978

Tropical storm
- 1-minute sustained (SSHWS/NWS)
- Highest winds: 50 mph (85 km/h)
- Lowest pressure: 1005 mbar (hPa); 29.68 inHg

Overall effects
- Fatalities: 33 direct
- Damage: $110 million (1978 USD)
- Areas affected: Texas
- IBTrACS
- Part of the 1978 Atlantic hurricane season

Tropical Storm Amelia was a weak but catastrophic tropical storm that was the second-wettest tropical cyclone on record to strike the continental United States. Amelia developed from a tropical wave that moved through the Atlantic Ocean uneventfully. The disturbance then entered an area of the Gulf of Mexico that was conducive to tropical cyclogenesis and became the first tropical depression of the season, after which it was forecast to make landfall before any significant intensification. However, the tropical depression defied predictions, quickly strengthening into a weak tropical storm just hours before making landfall in Corpus Christi. The storm lasted roughly a day over land before becoming unidentifiable after being active for just under 48 hours. After dissipating, the storm caused a severe flooding disaster in Texas.

Amelia affected the Texas coast for two days which caused several shipping incidents and minor damage in Corpus Christi and South Padre Island. While active, there were no deaths linked to the storm. However, the biggest impact from the storm followed its dissipation, when its remnants contributed to record rainfall totals over the state. The state, already suffering from a previous drought, believed that the rain would help alleviate the conditions. However, the dry ground aided the flooding from the storm. The rainfall caused several rivers and creeks to flood, especially around the Texas Hill Country and northern Texas, leading to severe damage. Following the storm, President Jimmy Carter declared six counties in the state as federal disaster areas, allowing residents to seek aid from the government. Additional aid was brought in from as far away as New York. Overall, Amelia caused 33 fatalities with an estimated $110 million in damages in what then-governor Dolph Briscoe called one of the worst floods in the history of the state.

== Meteorological history ==
Map plotting the storm's track and intensity, according to the Saffir–Simpson scale Map key Saffir–Simpson scale Tropical depression (≤38 mph, ≤62 km/h) Tropical storm (39–73 mph, 63–118 km/h) Category 1 (74–95 mph, 119–153 km/h) Category 2 (96–110 mph, 154–177 km/h) Category 3 (111–129 mph, 178–208 km/h) Category 4 (130–156 mph, 209–251 km/h) Category 5 (≥157 mph, ≥252 km/h) Unknown Storm type Tropical cyclone Subtropical cyclone Extratropical cyclone, remnant low, tropical disturbance, or monsoon depression

A tropical wave moved off the African coast on July 19. The system headed westward through the Atlantic Ocean for the next week with no change in development. After entering the Caribbean Sea on July 26, convection began to come together two days later due to the influence of anticyclonic flow. The disturbance passed the Yucatan Peninsula on July 29 and entered the Gulf of Mexico. No circulation was found in the developing system, however.

On July 30, the disturbance turned to the northwest and entered an area of the Gulf with slightly above normal sea surface temperatures and low vertical wind shear, which favored further development. At this point, the presentation seen on satellite imagery had indicated that a tropical cyclone was beginning to form in the Gulf. After a reconnaissance aircraft went into the system, the cyclone was upgraded into the first tropical depression of the season that afternoon while 30 miles (48 km) south of Brownsville, Texas. When it formed, it was moving north-northwest at 12 mph (19 km/h), which was thought at the time to inhibit further strengthening due to the depression moving onto land. Several hours later, the depression was upgraded to Tropical Storm Amelia, a decision that one forecaster said was made to be on the safe side. Amelia peaked at 50 mph (80 km/h) in wind speed when it was upgraded, with the system beginning to skirt the Texas coast. At peak intensity, the storm had gale-force winds along a diameter of 150 miles (240 km).

Amelia, which never had a well-defined center, went up the coast during the afternoon and evening of July 30, making landfall in Corpus Christi the next day. The system was tracked until passing just west of San Antonio, where it became indiscernible after the morning of August 1. The storm was active for a short span of time — just under two days — forming and dissipating so quickly that, following the storm, there was some controversy about the reliability of the weather forecasters.

== Preparations ==
While the storm was over water, small craft advisories were issued by the Coast Guard in addition to cautioning people on vacation in South Padre Island to avoid the beaches. However, as it was a Sunday evening, most of the ships were already coming into port. As Amelia approached the Texas coast, gale warnings were issued for the area from Brownsville to Port O'Connor on July 30. Due to it forming in close proximity to the coast, warnings were issued as soon as the storm was named. As the state had been in the midst of a severe drought the previous six weeks, there was hope that Amelia would relieve the dry conditions. However, the drought conditions would benefit the floods from the storm due to the ground being rendered so dry that it was unable to soak up all the rain from the storm.

== Impact ==
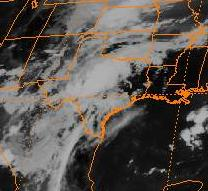
The remnants of Amelia on August 3.

Effects from Amelia as a tropical cyclone ranged from 38 miles per hour (61 km/h) winds in Brownsville to gusts of up to 58 miles per hour (93 km/h) in Corpus Christi. Inland Texas fared much worse, though. The continuous flow of tropical moisture during Amelia's dissipation and remnant stage brought heavy flooding for two to three days, putting 25 counties under flash flood warnings. The orographic effect of the Edwards Plateau enhanced the flooding, leading to rainfall totals as high as 48 inches (1,200 mm) in a two-day period. Although the showers stretched into Dallas, Oklahoma, and Arkansas, any damages from the storm in these areas are unknown. The final toll from the storm was 33 dead, most of which occurred a week after the storm made landfall, and $110 million in damage. Most of the damage was located in two specific areas: an area consisting of the towns of Albany and Graham, and the Texas Hill Country, although light flooding was reported elsewhere.

=== Gulf of Mexico and the Texas Coast ===
In coastal areas of Texas, damage was limited to the sinking of several shrimp boats and the beaching of sail boats. One ship — the Mermaid of the Sea — was caught in the middle of the storm. Although it sank, its crew was rescued. A pleasure boat with three occupants and the two-man crew of a beached catamaran were all reported missing, but were later found. Three other people on board a fishing vessel were treated for exposure. Rescue ships were hampered by anchored Mexican boats and surfers in a channel near the Coast Guard station. According to the Coast Guard, all nine ships that had been reported missing in the storm were later accounted for. Along with the ships, an oil drilling rig in the Gulf was ripped from its location and ran aground near Matagorda Island by the storm. The 19 crew members of the rig were rescued by helicopter. As the rig had not yet begun drilling, there was no threat from an oil spill.

In Port Isabel, there was some flooding on the southeast part of the town which was alleviated when some of the manhole covers were opened. In addition, a tornado was thought to have touched down, causing minor damage. South Padre Island reported power outages after receiving over 4 inches (100 mm) of rain and the Queen Isabella Causeway was rendered nearly impassable due to rainfall. During its time as a tropical cyclone, there were no deaths linked to Amelia.

=== Northern Texas ===
The town of Albany was hit hard when the town drainage system and Hubbard Creek both flooded. The ensuing torrent destroyed 25–30 houses and a dozen businesses and damaged hundreds more while inundating 80% of the town. In addition, all incoming roads were flooded, the pavement on U.S. Route 283 was washed away, and a bridge on U.S. Route 180 buckled, preventing anyone from entering or leaving on land. The town's water supply was contaminated and the electricity and communications were also knocked out. The death toll from Albany was set at nine dead and twelve missing, although the town sheriff said that four people who were missing would likely never be found due to several cave-ins along the creek, possibly burying them up to 20 feet (6.1 m) deep in mud. Rescue efforts here were hampered by overflowing creeks and a lack of communication. The rain was also responsible for carving a 50 feet (15 m) deep hole in an earthen dam at nearby Lake Throckmorton, but the water from the dam was safely taken up by a nearby creek. The town of Throckmorton itself was completely evacuated and, like Albany, had its fresh water supply contaminated.

North of Albany, the Brazos River also flooded, with the Clear Fork Brazos River becoming 2 miles (3.2 km) wide at one point, despite normally being a dry creek bed. The Brazos overflowing, in addition to the flooding of the nearby Salt Creek, resulted in the west side of Graham — the county seat of Young County where flood victims from Eliasville and South Bend had taken shelter — becoming flooded over to within blocks of the Young County Courthouse. Later, the flood waters were reported to have entered the basement of the courthouse. Effects from the flooding in Graham ranged from 150 houses and 40–50 businesses being inundated to the loss of water and electrical utilities. No fatalities were reported, however, due to the water levels rising gradually, leaving time for residents to evacuate. The crest of the Brazos flood then headed for the Possum Kingdom Lake with a threat of lowland flooding, resulting in evacuations of riverside towns in Parker and Palo Pinto counties, although a report from Palo Pinto said that no flooding was expected. The flooding was alleviated at the Possum Kingdom Lake, as the lake was already down 6 feet (1.8 m) from normal and some of the floodgates there were opened, taking most of the water from the flood. Elm Creek, near Abilene, also swelled, flooding into the town, but the only reported damage there was street flooding. An additional death was reported in the town of Morse.

=== Southern Texas ===
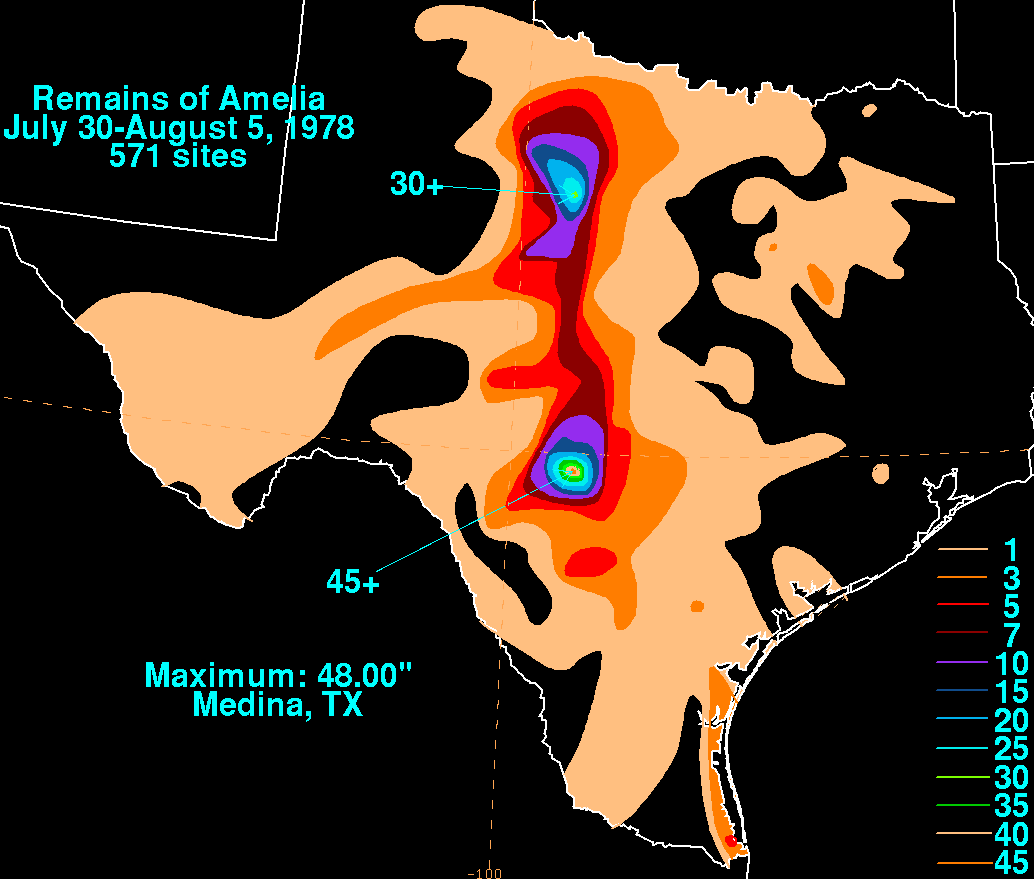
Amelia's Rainfall Totals in Texas

The hardest hit area during the storm was the Guadalupe River basin and its tributaries. A sign of the oncoming problem was a wall of water witnessed cascading down the Leona River in Uvalde. Like with Graham, Uvalde was ultimately flooded up to a block away from the courthouse. The Guadalupe River became heavily flooded, rising 10 feet (3.0 m) in one hour. The rapid rise covered a bridge on U.S. Route 281, 40 miles (64 km) north of San Antonio and prompted evacuations in a 20 miles (32 km) area near the flood plains. The overflowing river was responsible for ten total deaths in Kendall and Kerr Counties and submerging Comfort under seven feet of water, killing four people there. The towns of Welfare and Center Point were also reported to be flooded. In nearby Hunt, a group of military personnel who entered the region to assist with rescues got stranded themselves. After receding, the Guadalupe steadily became filled again, prompting re-evacuations. Near Stonewall, the Pedernales overflowed its banks, covering the area in up to 28 feet (8.5 m) of water and swamping the Lyndon B. Johnson National Historical Park. The only overflow to emanate from Mexico was from the Rio Conchos, which dumped its overflowing water into the Rio Grande and subsequently damaged the international bridge between Mexico and the United States in Presidio.

The worst impact was confined to Bandera County. The impact in the county stemmed from flooding of the Medina River which, infused with high rainfall, produced a 500-year flood. In Bandera, the Medina turned into a 50 feet (15 m) wall of water, which destroyed several of the trees along the river in addition to causing various items to litter the roads. In isolated areas, there was an odor from decaying livestock. Two people were witnessed clinging to a roof that was swept into the Medina. A further 100 people were cut off due to the river flood. 10–15 houses were washed away and the courthouse became an evacuation center by virtue of being the only area above the water. Electricity and all phone lines save the Sheriff Department line were knocked out in the city and several houses that were still standing had standing water inside them. At the riverfront Camp Bandina, eight people were reported killed while 100 children escaped by staying at the church camp nearby. The Peaceful Valley Ranch was nearly decimated, with only the building foundations still remaining. Six people were killed by the floods while sleeping while 20 guests and staff rode out the storm by clinging to trees and roofs for six hours. The town of Medina was rendered inaccessible by road after the Medina combined with the Sabinal River. There were also reports of looting in the county, but no arrests were made. One of the survivors of the flooding in this area was former Miss USA Kimberly Tomes, whose family was vacationing at a dude ranch in the area. After leaving and grabbing onto a tree, she witnessed cars and mobile homes passing by.

== Aftermath ==
Following the storm, there was some controversy as to the nature of the storms. A cloud seeding project was underway near Albany only hours before the town was hit with flooding. However, the rains were determined to have been tropical in origin. At the request of Governor Dolph Briscoe, President Jimmy Carter declared Kendall, Kerr, and Bandera Counties as disaster areas, allowing citizens in these areas to receive federal aid. All three counties had previously been declared disaster areas due to the prior drought. Later, three more counties — Young, Shackleford, and Haskell — were added to the list. Briscoe described the disaster as one of the worst floods in the history of the state. Evacuation centers were set up in Kerrville, Comfort, and Center Point to allow refugees to wait out the floods. In Bandera, 300 people applied for relief and 200 mobile homes were sent to help the homeless. The cafeteria of the junior high school was used as both a morgue and a Red Cross emergency center.

In Albany, New York, a disk jockey named Bryan Jackson helped organize a relief effort for the Texas town of the same name, with sponsorship from radio station WOKO and a local supermarket chain. After raising six tons of emergency aid and $1,000 from area residents, a C-130 airplane was loaded with the provisions, but the plane was continuously grounded due to calls saying that Albany, Texas was not a disaster area and did not need the relief. After what was described by U.S. Senator Samuel S. Stratton as almost a comedy of errors, the flight was funded by the Defense Department and was able to take off. In addition, a sheriff dispatch in the Texas town mentioned that aid was possibly being sent from several other towns with the same name as well as from other Texas towns like Abilene.

=== Records ===
Amelia and its remnants set several records for rainfall and flooding. The Medina River crested at 45 feet (14 m), breaking the record for flood stage reached on the river that was set in 1919 at 43 feet (13 m) as well as breaking the record for water flow, or the rate in which water flows down the river, at 79 billion gallons per day. Additionally, the Brazos River had its highest flooding since 1957. Records were also set for flowing on the Guadalupe, which flowed at 149 billion gallons a day, more than twice the previous record and nearly 1500 times its usual rate of 100 million gallons per day. The storm total of 48 inches (120 cm) measured at Medina was the wettest known storm total rainfall amount for both the state of Texas and any tropical cyclone impacting the continental United States until Hurricane Harvey in 2017. A 12-hour total of 26 inches (660 mm) of rain at Abilene was an extreme example of the precipitation.

In addition, with genesis occurring at a longitude of 97.0°W Amelia holds the record for the westernmost formation of a tropical cyclone in the North Atlantic hurricane database, which dates back to 1851.

== See also ==
- Tropical Storm Allison (2001)
- Tropical Storm Charley (1998)
- Tropical Storm Claudette (1979)
- Tropical Storm Danielle (1980)
- Tropical Storm Frances (1998)
- Tropical Storm Colin (2016) – another storm that was poorly organized, never had a well-defined center and was questioned about its status
- Tropical Storm Imelda (2019)
- Other storms of the same name
- List of wettest tropical cyclones in Texas
