= Lueders, Texas =

City in Texas

- City
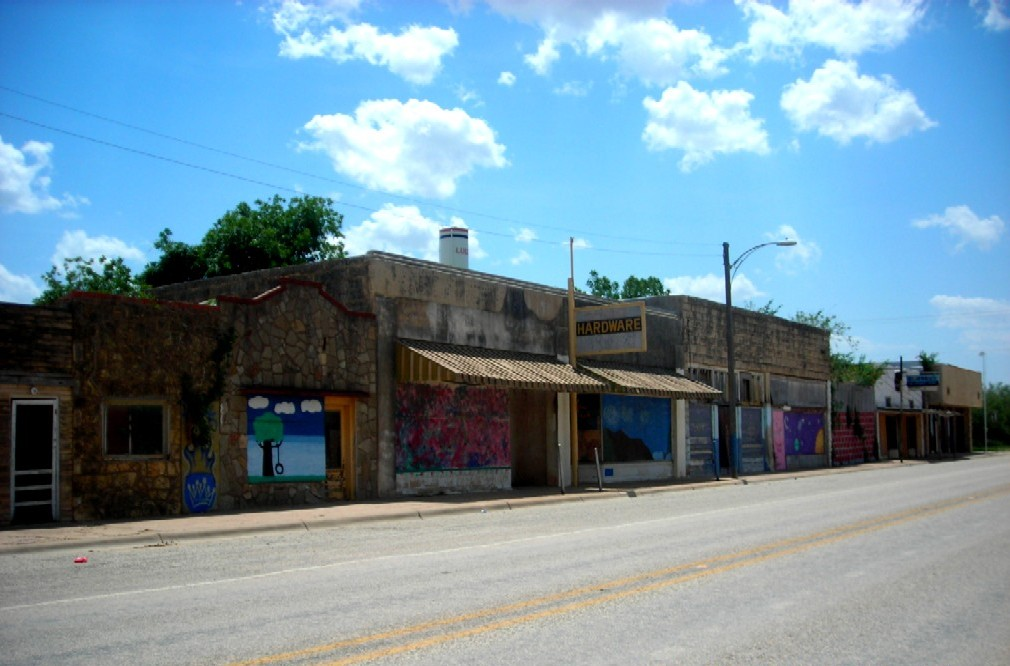
- A row of shops in Lueders

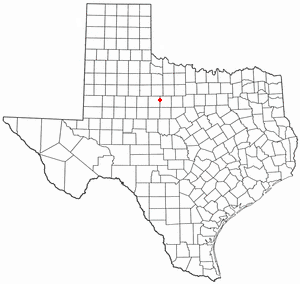
- Location of Lueders, Texas

- Coordinates: 32°48′02″N 99°37′24″W
- Country: United States
- State: Texas
- Counties: Jones, Shackelford
- Incorporated (city): 1947

Government
  - Type: General Law Type A

Area
  - Total: 0.59 sq mi (1.5 km^{2})
  - Land: 0.59 sq mi (1.5 km^{2})
  - Water: 0 sq mi (0 km^{2})
- Elevation: 1,565 ft (477 m)

Population (2020)
  - Total: 258
  - Density: 440/sq mi (170/km^{2})
- Time zone: UTC-6 (Central (CST))
  - Summer (DST): UTC-5 (CDT)
- ZIP code: 79533
- Area code: 325
- GNIS feature ID: 2410894

Lueders is a city in Jones and Shackelford Counties in the U.S. state of Texas. Its population was 258 at the 2020 census. The portion of Lueders located in Jones County is part of the Abilene, Texas metropolitan area.

== Geography ==
Lueders is located in eastern Jones County. The city limits extend east to include 3,465 square metres (0.9 acres) with zero population in Shackelford County. (Note: "Geographic Identifiers: 2010 Demographic Profile Data (G001): Lueders city (part), Albany CCD, Shackelford County, Texas". U.S. Census Bureau, American Factfinder.) The city has a total area of 1.5 square kilometres (0.58 sq mi), all land.

Texas State Highway 6 passes through the city on Main Street, leading northwest 15 miles (24 km) to Stamford and southeast 21 miles (34 km) to Albany. The Clear Fork Brazos River passes just south of the city limits.

== Demographics ==
Historical population
Census	Pop.	Note	%±
1950	708		—
1960	654		−7.6%
1970	511		−21.9%
1980	420		−17.8%
1990	365		−13.1%
2000	300		−17.8%
2010	346		15.3%
2020	258		−25.4%
U.S. Decennial Census

=== 2020 census ===
As of the 2020 census, Lueders had a population of 258, with 115 households and 60 families residing in the city.

As of the 2020 census, the median age was 40.3 years, 23.3% of residents were under the age of 18, and 16.3% of residents were 65 years of age or older; for every 100 females there were 118.6 males and for every 100 females age 18 and over there were 120.0 males age 18 and over.

As of the 2020 census, 0.0% of residents lived in urban areas, while 100.0% lived in rural areas.

Of the 115 households in Lueders, 34.8% had children under the age of 18 living with them, 39.1% were married-couple households, 26.1% were households with a male householder and no spouse or partner present, and 28.7% were households with a female householder and no spouse or partner present. About 27.8% of all households were made up of individuals and 16.5% had someone living alone who was 65 years of age or older. There were 123 housing units, of which 6.5% were vacant; the homeowner vacancy rate was 0.0% and the rental vacancy rate was 2.9%.

Racial composition as of the 2020 census
Race	Number	Percent
White	218	84.5%
Black or African American	0	0.0%
American Indian and Alaska Native	1	0.4%
Asian	1	0.4%
Native Hawaiian and Other Pacific Islander	0	0.0%
Some other race	9	3.5%
Two or more races	29	11.2%
Hispanic or Latino (of any race)	38	14.7%

=== 2000 census ===
As of the 2000 census, 300 people, 125 households, and 75 families resided in the city. The population density was 485.4 inhabitants per square mile (187.4/km^{2}). The 168 housing units had an average density of 271.8 per square mile (104.9/km^{2}). The racial makeup of the city was 95.67% White, 0.67% African American, 1.33% Native American, 2.00% from other races, and 0.33% from two or more races. Hispanics or Latinos of any race were 3.67% of the population.

Of the 125 households, 30.4% had children under 18 living with them, 46.4% were married couples living together, 8.8% had a female householder with no husband present, and 40.0% were not families. About 36.8% of all households were made up of individuals, and 20.0% had someone living alone who was 65 or older. The average household size was 2.40 and the average family size was 3.25.

In the city, the age distribution was 29.7% under 18, 6.3% from 18 to 24, 20.7% from 25 to 44, 26.3% from 45 to 64, and 17.0% who were 65 or older. The median age was 39 years. For every 100 females, there were 92.3 males. For every 100 females 18 and over, there were 78.8 males.

The median income for a household in the city was $26,058 and for a family was $29,318. Males had a median income of $25,341 versus $15,000 for females. The per capita income for the city was $13,877. About 11.0% of families and 15.6% of the population were below the poverty line, including 7.2% of those under 18 and 22.9% of those 65 or over.

== Education ==
Lueders had its own schools until 1967, when they merged with those in Avoca to form the Lueders-Avoca Independent School District.
