= Tuxedo, Texas =

- Unincorporated community
- Location within Texas Location within the United States
- Coordinates: 32°55′58″N 99°57′06″W
- Country: United States
- State: Texas
- County: Jones
- Elevation: 1,683 ft (513 m)
- Time zone: UTC-6 (Central (CST))
  - Summer (DST): UTC-5 (CDT)
- GNIS feature ID: 1379185

Tuxedo is an unincorporated community in Jones County, Texas, United States.
