= 1965 Little All-America college football team =

American college football all-star team

The 1965 Little All-America college football team is composed of college football players from small colleges and universities who were selected by the Associated Press (AP) as the best players at each position. For 1965, the AP selected two teams, each team having separate offensive and defensive platoons.

Senior Mel Stanton earned first-team honors after rushing for 1,238 yards, scoring 21 touchdowns, and leading Eastern Washington to its first conference championship since 1951.

Senior quarterback was described as "one of the most exciting quarterbacks of recent years", passing for 4,308 yard during his career at Texas A&I.

Junior linebacker Willie Lanier of Morgan State went on to play 11 years with the Kansas City Chiefs and was inducted into both the College and Pro Football Hall of Fames.

Defensive tackle Frank Cornish of Grambling was the largest player on the first team at 6 feet, 7 inches, and 285 pounds.

== First team ==
Position	Player	Team
Offense
QB	Randy Johnson	Texas A&I
HB	Mel Stanton	Eastern Washington
HB	Allen Smith	Findlay
FB	Randy Schultz	State College of Iowa
E	Tom Mitchell	Bucknell
E	Jerome Bell	Central State (OK)
T	Larry Cox	Abilene Christian
T	Richard Rhodes	Northeast Missouri State
G	Dan Summers	Arkansas State
G	Willie Young	Grambling
C	Marvin Peterson	Pacific Lutheran
Defense
DE	Tom Nelson	Sul Ross
DE	Dave Lince	North Dakota
DT	Robert Burles	Willamette
DT	Frank Cornish	Grambling
LB	Willie Lanier	Morgan State
LB	John Huard	Maine
LB	Keith Atchley	Middle Tennessee
DB	Pat Whalin	St. John's (MN)
DB	Timothy Chilcutt	Austin Peay
DB	John Perry	Tampa
DB	Barry Roach	East Stroudsburg

== Second team ==
Position	Player	Team
Offense
QB	Ray Jones	Los Angeles State
HB	Ken Rota	North Dakota State
HB	David Flet	Northern Michigan
FB	Dave Alexander	East Carolina
E	Rich Kotite	Wagner
E	Milt Morin	UMass
T	Fred Cremer	St. John's (MN)
T	Leonard Tyler	Ithaca
G	Harlan Aden	Omaha
G	Robert Ferguson	Linfield
C	Al DePalma	Montclair State
Defense
DE	Tom Davis	Tennessee A&I
DE	Bill Scott	Northeastern Oklahoma State
DT	Brad Hamilton	Southwestern Louisiana
DT	Sid Otton	Weber State
LB	Vern McManus	Lamar Tech
LB	Wayne Harrington	Montana
LB	Henry Sorrell	Chattanooga
DB	Al Mota	Illinois Wesleyan
DB	Carlos Maiord	McMurry
DB	Richard Heinen	Northwest Missouri State
DB	George Clayton	Fairmont State

== See also ==
- 1965 College Football All-America Team
