= Lueders-Avoca Independent School District =

School district in Texas

Coordinates: 32.7983°N 99.6248°W

Lueders-Avoca Independent School District is a public school district based in Lueders, Texas, United States.

In addition to Lueders, the district serves the unincorporated communities of Avoca and Nugent in eastern Jones County. A portion of Shackelford County also lies within the district.

Lueders-Avoca ISD has two schools - Lueders-Avoca High (grades 9–12; located in Avoca) and Lueders-Avoca Elementary/Junior High (prekindergarten-grade 8) located in Lueders.

== Academic achievement ==
In 2009, the school district was rated "recognized" by the Texas Education Agency.

== Special programs ==
=== Athletics ===
Lueders-Avoca High School plays six-man football.

== See also ==
- List of school districts in Texas
