= Avoca, Texas =

Unincorporated community in Texas, US

Coordinates: 32°51′56″N 99°42′57″W

Location of Avoca in Texas

Avoca (/əˈvoʊkə/ ə-VOH-kə) is an unincorporated community in Jones County, Texas, United States.

It is on State Highway 6 at the intersection of Farm to Market Road 600 and Farm to Market Road 1636, 8 mi southeast of Stamford. Avoca is part of the Abilene, Texas, metropolitan statistical area.

== History ==
Avoca was laid out at its current location in 1900, when the railroad was extended to that point; the town site had formerly been located a few miles away. The name is derived from the post office at the former site called Avo, before then the small town was called Spring Creek. As of 2022, Avoca had two churches: Avoca Baptist Church Pastor Mims and Avoca United Methodist Church, of which the pastor was Dennis Huffaker, and the Lueders Avoca High School. The area has no post office, nor any businesses.

== Education ==
The Lueders-Avoca Independent School District serves the area's high school students in grades 9-12. Pre-kindergarten through eighth grade attend the Lueders Campus.

== Notable person ==
- Charles Stenholm lived in Avoca while a member of the United States House of Representatives.
- Max Williams (February 28, 1938 - January 27,2025) lived in Avoca through his high school years, graduating from Avoca High School in 1956, and helped form the Dallas Chaparrals as part of the American Basketball Association and became the general manager from 1967-71 and was their head coach in 1970-1971. Before he joined the ABA, Williams accumulated 3,360 career points as a high school basketball player during the 1950s in Avoca. With the SMU Mustangs men's basketball team, Williams held the free throw percentage season record for the university in 1958 and 1960. He had 940 career points with SMU after his final season in 1960. Williams was inducted into the Texas Sports Hall of Fame in 2009 and the Big Country Athletic Hall of Fame in 2013. He was also selected as one of the best 100 boys basketball players in Texas by the UIL upon the organization's 100th anniversary.
