= Hawley Independent School District =

School district in Texas

Location
- Hawley, TX ESC Region 14 USA

District information
- Type: Public
- Grades: Pre-K through 12
- Superintendent: Kim Meyer

Students and staff
- Athletic conference: UIL Class AA
- District mascot: Bearcat

Other information
- Website: Hawley ISD

Hawley Independent School District is a public school district based in Hawley, Texas, United States.

The district has three campuses - Hawley High (grades 9-12), Hawley Middle (grades 6-8), and Hawley Elementary (prekindergarten-grade 5).

The Bearcats won the 1995 Class AAA and 1997 Class AA state softball championships, and they were the UIL Class AA 2022 Football State Champions.

In 2009, the school district was rated "recognized" by the Texas Education Agency.
