= Corinth, Jones County, Texas =

- Unincorporated community
- Location within Texas Location within the United States
- Coordinates: 32°51′15″N 99°52′09″W
- Country: United States
- State: Texas
- County: Jones
- Elevation: 1,641 ft (500 m)
- Time zone: UTC-6 (Central (CST))
  - Summer (DST): UTC-5 (CDT)
- Area code: 325
- GNIS feature ID: 1378159

Corinth is an unincorporated community in Jones County, Texas, United States. Corinth is located on U.S. Route 277, 7.4 miles (11.9 km) south-southwest of Stamford. The community had a population of 25 from 1940 to 1990 and a population of 10 in 2000.
