= Jones County, Texas =

County in Texas, United States

- County
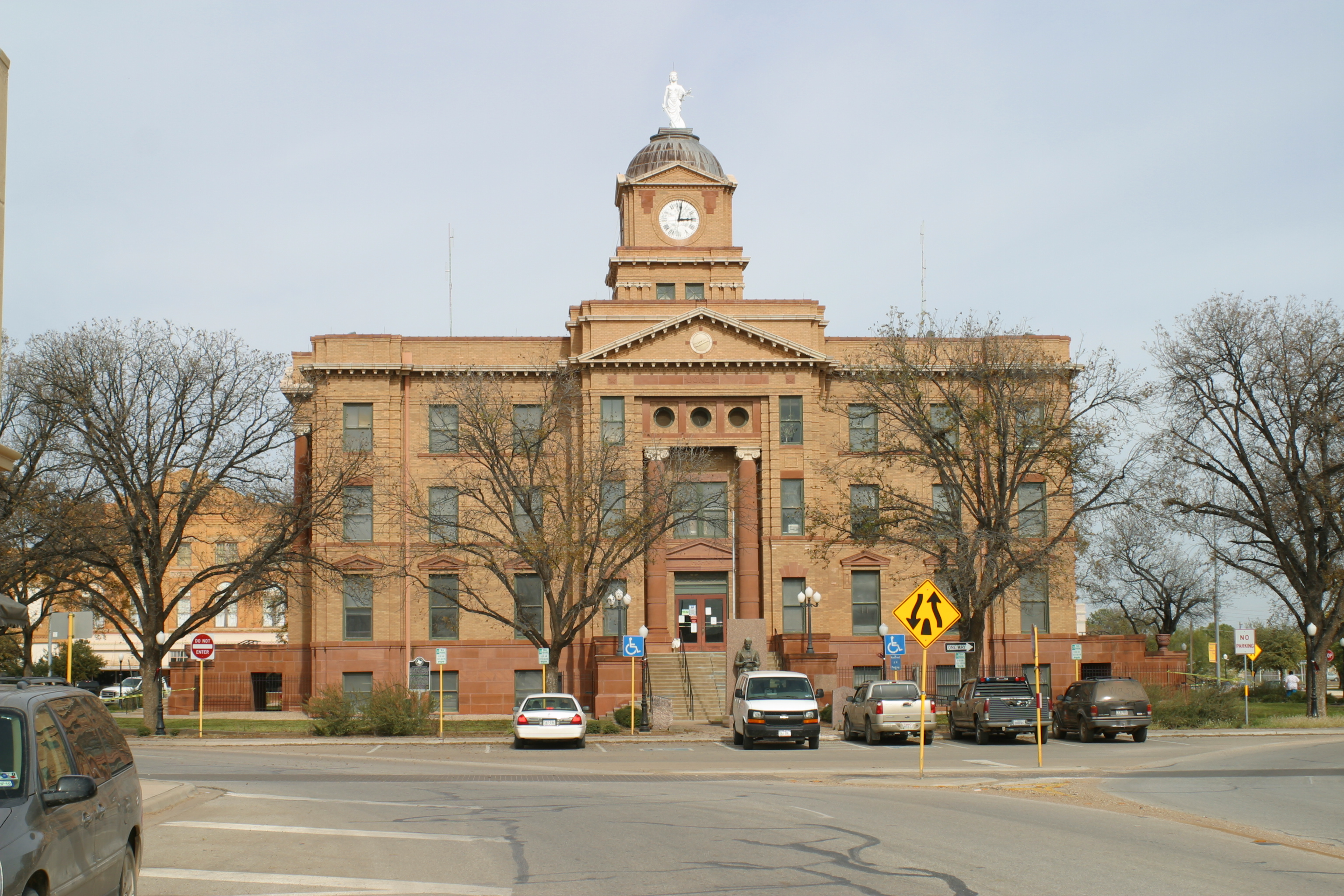
- Jones County Courthouse in Anson, Texas

- Location within the U.S. state of Texas
- Coordinates: 32°44′N 99°53′W
- Country: United States
- State: Texas
- Founded: 1881
- Named for: Anson Jones
- Seat: Anson
- Largest city: Stamford

Area
  - Total: 937.1 sq mi (2,427 km^{2})
  - Land: 928.6 sq mi (2,405 km^{2})
  - Water: 8.6 sq mi (22 km^{2}) 0.9%

Population (2020)
  - Total: 19,663
  - Estimate (2025): 20,861 ▲
  - Density: 21.17/sq mi (8.176/km^{2})
- Time zone: UTC−6 (Central)
  - Summer (DST): UTC−5 (CDT)
- Congressional district: 19th
- Website: www.co.jones.tx.us

Jones County is a county located in the U.S. state of Texas. As of the 2020 census, its population was 19,663. Its county seat is Anson. The county was created in 1858 and organized in 1881. Both the county and its county seat are named for Anson Jones, the fourth and final president of the Republic of Texas.

Jones County is included in the Abilene metropolitan area.

== Geography ==
According to the U.S. Census Bureau, the county has a total area of 937 square miles (2,430 km^{2}), of which 8.6 square miles (22 km^{2}) (0.9%) are covered by water.

=== Major highways ===
- U.S. Highway 83
- U.S. Highway 180
- U.S. Highway 277
- State Highway 6
- State Highway 92
- State Highway 351

=== Adjacent counties ===
- Haskell County (north)
- Shackelford County (east)
- Callahan County (southeast)
- Taylor County (south)
- Fisher County (west)
- Stonewall County (northwest)

== Demographics ==
Historical population
Census	Pop.	Note	%±
1880	546		—
1890	3,797		595.4%
1900	7,053		85.8%
1910	24,299		244.5%
1920	22,323		−8.1%
1930	24,233		8.6%
1940	23,378		−3.5%
1950	22,147		−5.3%
1960	19,299		−12.9%
1970	16,106		−16.5%
1980	17,268		7.2%
1990	16,490		−4.5%
2000	20,785		26.0%
2010	20,202		−2.8%
2020	19,663		−2.7%
2025 (est.)	20,861	▲	6.1%
U.S. Decennial Census; 1850–2010 2010 2020

=== Racial and ethnic composition ===
Jones County, Texas – Racial and ethnic composition Note: the US Census treats Hispanic/Latino as an ethnic category. This table excludes Latinos from the racial categories and assigns them to a separate category. Hispanics/Latinos may be of any race.
Race / Ethnicity (NH = Non-Hispanic)	Pop 1980	Pop 1990	Pop 2000	Pop 2010	Pop 2020	% 1980	% 1990	% 2000	% 2010	% 2020
White alone (NH)	13,865	12,970	13,752	12,549	11,485	80.29%	78.65%	66.16%	62.12%	58.41%
Black or African American alone (NH)	756	651	2,368	2,292	1,978	4.38%	3.95%	11.39%	11.35%	10.06%
Native American or Alaska Native alone (NH)	41	39	62	62	66	0.24%	0.24%	0.30%	0.31%	0.34%
Asian alone (NH)	58	29	91	76	111	0.34%	0.18%	0.44%	0.38%	0.56%
Native Hawaiian or Pacific Islander alone (NH)	x	x	2	1	4	x	x	0.01%	0.00%	0.02%
Other race alone (NH)	16	15	19	27	41	0.09%	0.09%	0.09%	0.13%	0.21%
Multiracial (NH)	x	x	145	186	474	x	x	0.70%	0.92%	2.41%
Hispanic or Latino (any race)	2,532	2,786	4,346	5,009	5,504	14.66%	16.90%	20.91%	24.79%	27.99%
Total	17,268	16,490	20,785	20,202	19,663	100.00%	100.00%	100.00%	100.00%	100.00%

=== 2020 census ===
As of the 2020 census, the county had a population of 19,663. The median age was 39.2 years; 17.7% of the residents were under 18 and 15.5% were 65 or older. For every 100 females, there were 165.1 males, and for every 100 females 18 and over, there were 183.8 males 18 and over.

The racial makeup of the county was 65.6% White, 10.3% Black or African American, 0.6% American Indian and Alaska Native, 0.6% Asian, <0.1% Native Hawaiian and Pacific Islander, 15.1% from some other race, and 7.7% from two or more races. Hispanic or Latino residents of any race comprised 28.0% of the population.

About 0.1% of residents lived in urban areas, while almost all lived in rural areas.

Of the 5,735 households in the county, 30.1% had children under 18 living in them, 53.8% were married-couple households, 18.0% were households with a male householder and no spouse or partner present, and 23.1% were households with a female householder and no spouse or partner present. About 25.5% of all households were made up of individuals, and 12.9% had someone living alone who was 65 years of age or older.

The county had 7,037 housing units, of which 18.5% were vacant. Among occupied housing units, 79.9% were owner-occupied and 20.1% were renter-occupied. The homeowner vacancy rate was 2.0% and the rental vacancy rate was 11.7%.

=== 2000 census ===
As of the 2000 census, 20,785 people, 6,140 households, and 4,525 families resided in the county. The population density was 22 people per square mile (8.5 people/km^{2}). The 7,236 housing units averaged 8 units per square mile (3.1/km^{2}). The racial makeup of the county was 78.80% White, 11.51% Black or African American, 0.49% Native American, 0.47% Asian, 7.47% from other races, and 1.27% from two or more races. About 20.9% of the population was Hispanic or Latino of any race.

Of the 6,140 households, 33.4% had children under 18 living with them, 59.6% were married couples living together, 10.1% had a female householder with no husband present, and 26.3% were not families. About 24.1% of all households were made up of individuals, and 13.4% had someone living alone who was 65 or older. The average household size was 2.58, and the average family size was 3.06.

The age distribution was 22.5% under 18, 11.1% from 18 to 24, 31.5% from 25 to 44, 21.0% from 45 to 64, and 14.0% who were 65 or older. The median age was 36 years. For every 100 females, there were 150.1 males. For every 100 females 18 and over, there were 159.7 males.

The median income in the county for a household was $29,572 and for a family was $35,391. Males had a median income of $26,892 versus $17,829 for females. The per capita income for the county was $13,656. About 13.1% of families and 16.8% of the population were below the poverty line, including 22.7% of those under 18 and 16.6% of those 65 or over.

== Government and infrastructure ==
The Texas Department of Criminal Justice (TDCJ) operates the Robertson Unit, located 10 miles from downtown. The state Middleton transfer unit is located partially in Abilene and also in Jones County.

From 2007 to 2017 Republican Susan King represented Jones, Nolan, and Taylor Counties in the state house.

=== Politics ===
"From their first presidential election in 1884 through 1992, the voters in Jones County have generally chosen Democratic candidates. They supported Republican candidates in 1928, 1952, 1972, 1984, and 1988."

Since 2000, the majority of voters selected Republican presidential candidates, with the margin of victory for the party's candidates increasing in each election.

Jones County is part of the 71st district for elections to the Texas House of Representatives.

Jones County is part of the 28th district for elections to the Texas Senate.

United States presidential election results for Jones County, Texas
Year	Republican		Democratic		Third party(ies)	
Year	No.	%	No.	%	No.	%
1912	63	3.89%	1,301	80.36%	255	15.75%
1916	114	5.34%	1,798	84.18%	224	10.49%
1920	270	11.83%	1,792	78.53%	220	9.64%
1924	566	15.39%	3,010	81.86%	101	2.75%
1928	1,995	55.95%	1,563	43.83%	8	0.22%
1932	224	7.03%	2,934	92.03%	30	0.94%
1936	305	8.24%	3,396	91.71%	2	0.05%
1940	401	9.79%	3,688	90.08%	5	0.12%
1944	361	8.77%	3,417	83.00%	339	8.23%
1948	432	10.34%	3,599	86.16%	146	3.50%
1952	2,941	52.21%	2,680	47.58%	12	0.21%
1956	2,073	44.32%	2,594	55.46%	10	0.21%
1960	2,196	44.04%	2,772	55.60%	18	0.36%
1964	1,295	26.32%	3,622	73.62%	3	0.06%
1968	1,676	33.66%	2,372	47.64%	931	18.70%
1972	3,202	75.11%	1,050	24.63%	11	0.26%
1976	2,072	38.26%	3,318	61.26%	26	0.48%
1980	2,765	47.07%	3,043	51.80%	66	1.12%
1984	4,017	62.93%	2,343	36.71%	23	0.36%
1988	3,000	50.71%	2,898	48.99%	18	0.30%
1992	2,088	35.20%	2,400	40.46%	1,444	24.34%
1996	2,351	43.46%	2,422	44.77%	637	11.77%
2000	4,080	67.46%	1,899	31.40%	69	1.14%
2004	4,254	71.72%	1,658	27.95%	19	0.32%
2008	4,203	72.37%	1,528	26.31%	77	1.33%
2012	4,262	76.56%	1,226	22.02%	79	1.42%
2016	4,819	80.86%	936	15.70%	205	3.44%
2020	5,660	83.89%	999	14.81%	88	1.30%
2024	5,988	86.20%	907	13.06%	52	0.75%

United States Senate election results for County, Texas1
Year	Republican		Democratic		Third party(ies)	
Year	No.	%	No.	%	No.	%
2024	5,729	83.02%	1,039	15.06%	133	1.93%

United States Senate election results for Jones County, Texas2
Year	Republican		Democratic		Third party(ies)	
Year	No.	%	No.	%	No.	%
2020	5,546	83.76%	967	14.61%	108	1.63%

Texas Gubernatorial election results for Jones County
Year	Republican		Democratic		Third party(ies)	
Year	No.	%	No.	%	No.	%
2022	4,349	87.12%	581	11.64%	62	1.24%

== Communities ==
=== Cities ===
- Abilene (mostly in Taylor County)
- Anson (county seat)
- Hamlin (small part in Fisher County)
- Hawley
- Lueders (small part in Shackelford County)
- Stamford (small part in Haskell County)

=== Unincorporated communities ===
- Avoca
- Corinth
- Noodle
- Nugent
- Radium
- Tuxedo

== Education ==
School districts include:

- Abilene Independent School District
- Anson Independent School District
- Clyde Consolidated Independent School District
- Hamlin Independent School District
- Hawley Independent School District
- Lueders-Avoca Independent School District
- Merkel Independent School District
- Paint Creek Independent School District
- Roby Consolidated Independent School District
- Stamford Independent School District
- Trent Independent School District

The Texas Legislature designated the county as being in the Western Texas College District.

== Notable person ==
- Charles Stenholm, former member of the United States House of Representatives

== See also ==
- Dry counties
- List of museums in West Texas
- National Register of Historic Places listings in Jones County, Texas
- Recorded Texas Historic Landmarks in Jones County
