= Anson Independent School District =

School district in Texas

Location
- 1431 Commercial Ave. Anson, Texas ESC Region 14 USA
- Coordinates: 32°45′12″N 99°53′47″W

District information
- Type: Independent school district
- Grades: Pre-K through 12
- Superintendent: Jay Baccus
- Schools: 3 (2009-10)
- NCES District ID: 4808400

Students and staff
- Students: 690 (2010-11)
- Teachers: 68.97 (2009-10) (on full-time equivalent (FTE) basis)
- Student–teacher ratio: 10.67 (2009-10)
- Athletic conference: UIL Class 1A Football Division I
- District mascot: Tigers
- Colors: Red, Black

Other information
- TEA District Accountability Rating for 2011-12: Recognized
- Website: Anson ISD

Anson Independent School District is a public school district based in Anson, Texas, United States.

== History ==
The first school taught in the town section of Anson was opened in April 1882 and closed in July of the same year. It was taught at the home of R. M. Huie which was located near the First Baptist Church. The next school was taught by and in the home of E. G. Jones, with the assistance of his wife (in 1956, the Johnny Moore Magnolia Station was located in the same place). The first school building was built on Block 55, Lot 4 (in 1933 it was owned by Joe Grace Estate). The decision to build the school was made at a mass meeting at the Buie Law office in 1883. They raised enough money by public subscription to build one room. The Masonic Lodge agreed to build a room for their own use, to cover the building, and to furnish the lot. The school was built by volunteer labor and was taught by E.G. Jones. In 1889, a larger building was needed. $5,000 was paid by the taxpayers and used to build this building. This was the building where the first graduating class was taught. They were graduated in 1897; the class consisting of Lola Hale, Allie Maxwell, Lelia Morris, Effie Neville, and Nannie Thompkins, and the principal was C. E. Evans. This school building was sold in 1904 and moved to become the Ansford Hotel. It stood until it burned down in 1943. A new, two-story brick school was built and used for all grades until 1910. Then a new high school building was erected south of the square. In 1929, the original unit of Ward School was constructed. In 1948 a $250,000 school bond was passed to build a new elementary school and remodel the existing high school. Finally, in 1968, the present high school was built.

The Texas author Lou Halsell Rodenberger (1926–2009) graduated as the valedictorian of Anson High School at the age of sixteen in 1942.

== Finances ==
As of the 2010-2011 school year, the appraised valuation of property in the district was $125,174,000. The maintenance tax rate was $0.117 and the bond tax rate was $0.022 per $100 of appraised valuation.

== Academic achievement ==
In 2011, the school district was rated "recognized" by the Texas Education Agency. Thirty-five percent of districts in Texas in 2011 received the same rating. No state accountability ratings will be given to districts in 2012. A school district in Texas can receive one of four possible rankings from the Texas Education Agency: Exemplary (the highest possible ranking), Recognized, Academically Acceptable, and Academically Unacceptable (the lowest possible ranking).

Historical district TEA accountability ratings

- 2011: Recognized
- 2010: Recognized
- 2009: Recognized
- 2008: Recognized
- 2007: Academically Acceptable
- 2006: Academically Acceptable
- 2005: Recognized
- 2004: Recognized

== Schools ==
In the 2011-2012 school year, the district had students in three schools.

- Anson High School (Grades 9-12)
- Anson Middle School (Grades 6-8)
- Anson Elementary School (Grades PK-5)

== Special programs ==
=== Athletics ===
Anson High School participates in the boys sports of baseball, basketball, football, and wrestling. The school participates in the girls sports of basketball, softball, and volleyball. For the 2012 through 2014 school years, Anson High School will play football in UIL Class 1A Division I.

== See also ==
- List of school districts in Texas
- List of high schools in Texas
