= Anson High School (Texas) =

Coordinates: 32.752921°N 99.896052°W

Location
- 1509 S Commercial; Anson, Texas 79501-5207; United States

Information
- School type: Public High School
- School district: Anson Independent School District
- Principal: Gina Overby
- Staff: 24.81 (FTE)
- Grades: 9-12
- Enrollment: 209 (2023–2024)
- Student to teacher ratio: 8.42
- Colors: Red, black, and white
- Athletics conference: UIL Class 3A
- Mascot: Tiger
- Yearbook: The Tiger
- Website: Anson High School

Anson High School is a public high school located in Anson, Texas and classified as a 3A school by the UIL. It is part of the Anson Independent School District and located in central Jones County. In 2015, the school was rated "Met Standard" by the Texas Education Agency.

== Athletics ==
The Anson Tigers compete in cross country, football, basketball, powerlifting, golf, tennis, track, baseball, and softball.

== Notable alumni ==
- Lou Halsell Rodenberger (September 21, 1926 – April 9, 2009) was a Texas author, educator, professor and journalist.
