= Clear Fork Brazos River =

River in Texas, United States

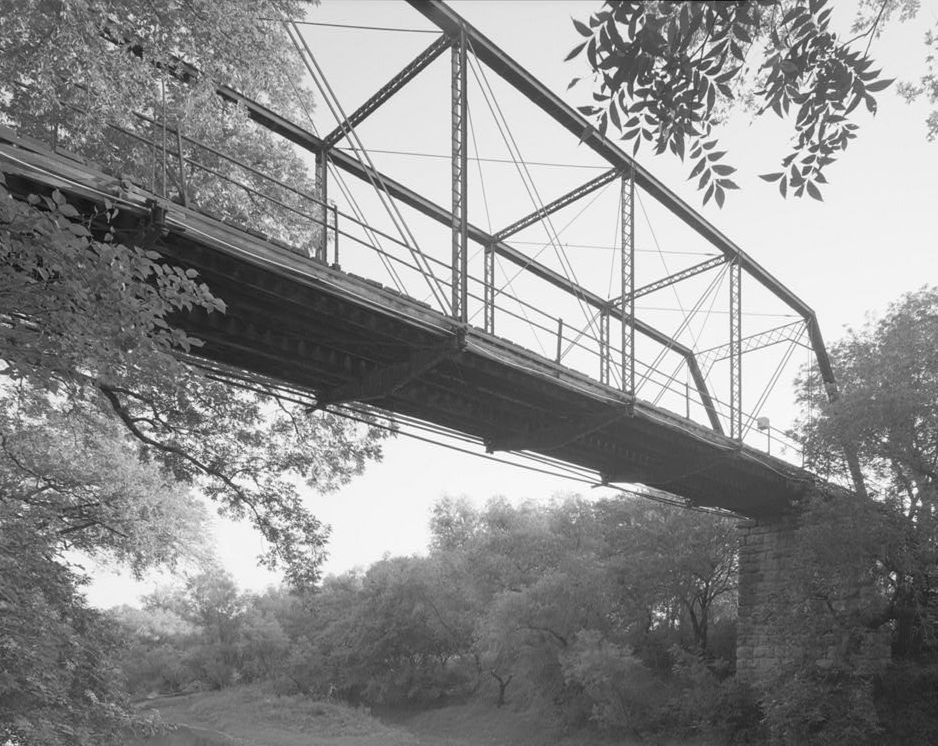
- Fort Griffin Iron Truss Bridge spanning the Clear Fork

Location
- Country: United States
- State: Texas

Physical characteristics
- Source: 2 miles (3.2 km) east-southeast of Hermleigh, Texas
  - location: Scurry County, Texas
  - coordinates: 32°39′43″N 100°44′34″W
  - elevation: 2,440 ft (740 m)
- Mouth: Confluence with Brazos River, 7.8 mi (12.6 km) south-southeast of Graham.
  - location: Young County, Texas
  - coordinates: 33°00′57″N 098°40′08″W
  - elevation: 1,017 ft (310 m)
- Length: 180 mi (290 km)
- Basin size: 3,350 sq mi (8,700 km^{2})

The Clear Fork Brazos River (from Comanche Pash-a-pe-ho-no) is the longest tributary of the Brazos River of Texas. It originates as a dry channel or draw in Scurry County about 2 mi (3.2 km) northeast of Hermleigh and runs for about 180 mi (290 km) through portions of Scurry, Fisher, Jones, Shackelford, and Throckmorton counties before joining the main stem of the Brazos River in Young County about 7.8 mi (12.6 km) south-southeast of Graham, Texas.

A tributary of the Clear Fork Brazos River is Paint Creek, which is dammed to form Lake Stamford.

== See also ==
- Canyon Valley, Texas
- Double Mountain Fork Brazos River
- Duffy's Peak
- Hobbs, Texas
- White River (Texas)
- Yellow House Canyon
- List of rivers of Texas
