= Anson, Texas =

- City
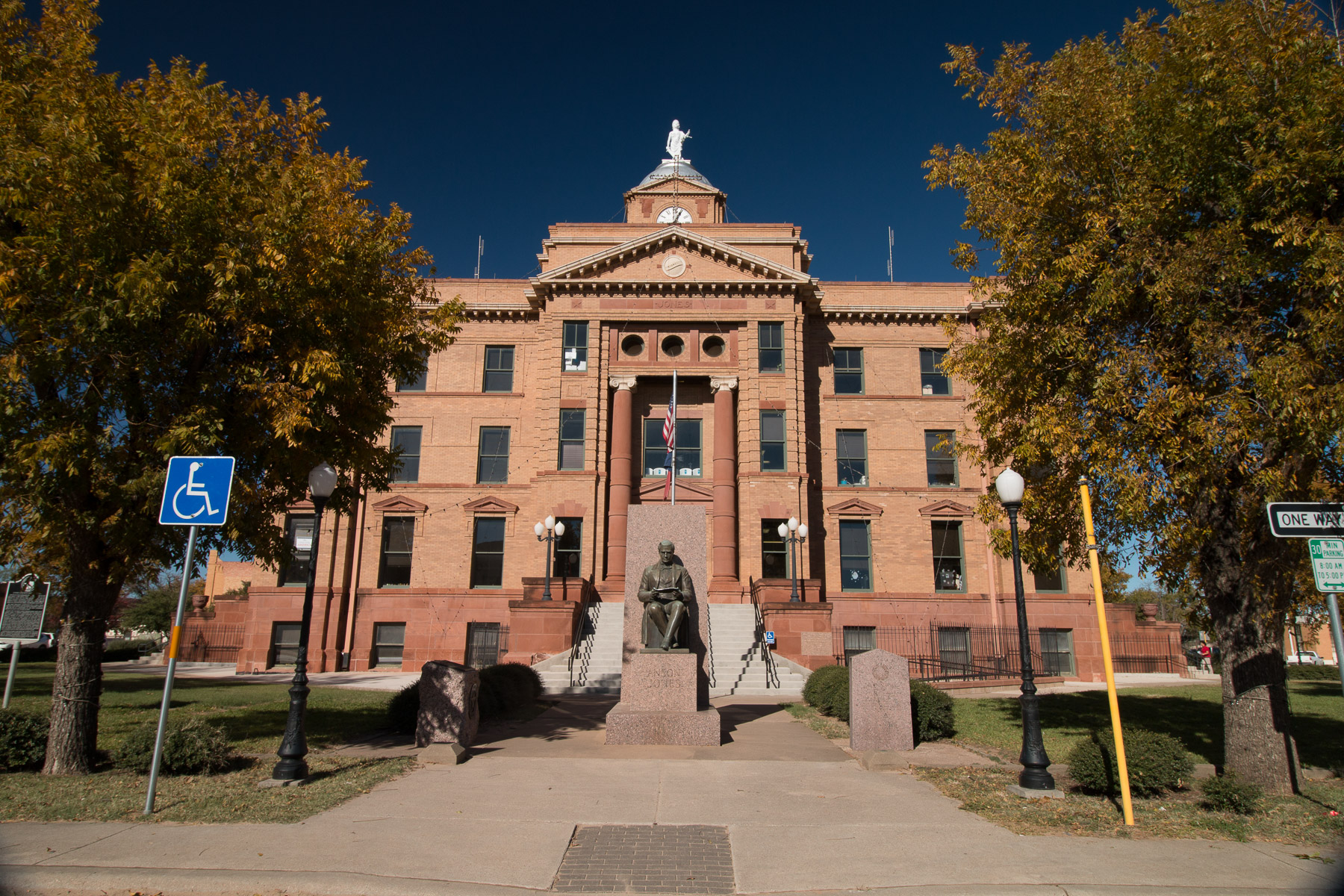
- Jones County Courthouse
- Interactive map of Anson, Texas
- Coordinates: 32°44′58″N 99°53′45″W
- Country: United States
- State: Texas
- County: Jones

Area
  - Total: 2.76 sq mi (7.16 km^{2})
  - Land: 2.76 sq mi (7.15 km^{2})
  - Water: 0.0039 sq mi (0.01 km^{2})
- Elevation: 1,729 ft (527 m)

Population (2020)
  - Total: 2,294
  - Density: 830.2/sq mi (320.56/km^{2})
- Time zone: UTC-6 (Central (CST))
  - Summer (DST): UTC-5 (CDT)
- ZIP code: 79501
- Area code: 325
- FIPS code: 48-03372
- GNIS feature ID: 2409713
- Website: anson-tx.us

Anson is a city in and the county seat of Jones County, Texas, United States. Its population was 2,294 at the 2020 census. It is part of the Abilene, Texas metropolitan area. Originally named "Jones City", the town was renamed "Anson" in 1882 in honor of Anson Jones, the last president of the Republic of Texas.

== Geography ==
Anson is located in central Jones County. Three U.S. highways pass through the city. U.S. Routes 83 and 277 run north–south through the center as Commercial Avenue, while U.S. Route 180 crosses on 17th Street. US 83 leads northwest 36 miles (58 km) to Aspermont, while US 277 leads northeast 15 miles (24 km) to Stamford, and the highways together lead southeast 24 miles (39 km) to Abilene. US 180 leads east 36 miles (58 km) to Albany and west 61 miles (98 km) to Snyder.

According to the United States Census Bureau, Anson has a total area of 2.8 square miles (7.2 km^{2}), of which 2.2 acres (8,855 m^{2}), or 0.12%, are covered by water. The city is part of the Brazos River watershed, with the southeastern corner of the city crossed by Carter Creek, and the northern part draining to Redmud Creek.

Anson is the site of Bluebonnet Detention Center, a controversial, privately owned and operated facility that houses individuals awaiting deportation by U.S. Immigration and Customs Enforcement.

== Climate ==
The climate in this area is characterized by hot, humid summers and generally mild to cool winters. According to the Köppen climate classification, Anson has a humid subtropical climate, Cfa on climate maps.

Climate data for Anson, Texas, 1991–2020 normals, extremes 1898–present
Month	Jan	Feb	Mar	Apr	May	Jun	Jul	Aug	Sep	Oct	Nov	Dec	Year
Record high °F (°C)	88 (31)	95 (35)	100 (38)	101 (38)	113 (45)	114 (46)	110 (43)	112 (44)	109 (43)	104 (40)	92 (33)	89 (32)	114 (46)
Mean maximum °F (°C)	78.6 (25.9)	82.8 (28.2)	88.9 (31.6)	93.3 (34.1)	99.7 (37.6)	101.4 (38.6)	103.6 (39.8)	103.2 (39.6)	98.6 (37.0)	93.5 (34.2)	84.1 (28.9)	78.4 (25.8)	106.0 (41.1)
Mean daily maximum °F (°C)	57.3 (14.1)	61.6 (16.4)	69.1 (20.6)	78.4 (25.8)	85.7 (29.8)	92.8 (33.8)	95.6 (35.3)	95.1 (35.1)	87.7 (30.9)	78.5 (25.8)	66.6 (19.2)	57.9 (14.4)	77.2 (25.1)
Daily mean °F (°C)	43.3 (6.3)	47.1 (8.4)	54.6 (12.6)	63.7 (17.6)	72.2 (22.3)	80.0 (26.7)	83.3 (28.5)	82.9 (28.3)	75.3 (24.1)	64.8 (18.2)	53.1 (11.7)	44.7 (7.1)	63.8 (17.7)
Mean daily minimum °F (°C)	29.4 (−1.4)	32.7 (0.4)	40.1 (4.5)	49.0 (9.4)	58.6 (14.8)	67.2 (19.6)	71.0 (21.7)	70.6 (21.4)	63.0 (17.2)	51.2 (10.7)	39.6 (4.2)	31.5 (−0.3)	50.3 (10.2)
Mean minimum °F (°C)	17.3 (−8.2)	20.3 (−6.5)	24.6 (−4.1)	34.6 (1.4)	46.1 (7.8)	59.2 (15.1)	64.9 (18.3)	63.4 (17.4)	51.3 (10.7)	36.7 (2.6)	25.8 (−3.4)	19.1 (−7.2)	13.1 (−10.5)
Record low °F (°C)	3 (−16)	−5 (−21)	9 (−13)	26 (−3)	35 (2)	48 (9)	55 (13)	50 (10)	32 (0)	19 (−7)	14 (−10)	−12 (−24)	−12 (−24)
Average precipitation inches (mm)	1.03 (26)	1.41 (36)	1.53 (39)	1.95 (50)	3.32 (84)	3.56 (90)	2.46 (62)	2.58 (66)	2.26 (57)	2.50 (64)	1.46 (37)	1.37 (35)	25.43 (646)
Average snowfall inches (cm)	0.9 (2.3)	0.4 (1.0)	0.0 (0.0)	0.5 (1.3)	0.0 (0.0)	0.0 (0.0)	0.0 (0.0)	0.0 (0.0)	0.0 (0.0)	0.0 (0.0)	1.2 (3.0)	0.8 (2.0)	3.8 (9.6)
Average precipitation days (≥ 0.01 in)	3.2	3.6	4.4	4.3	6.0	5.6	3.5	4.8	4.2	4.5	3.9	3.3	51.3
Average snowy days (≥ 0.1 in)	0.4	0.5	0.1	0.1	0.0	0.0	0.0	0.0	0.0	0.0	0.3	0.4	1.8
Source 1: NOAA
Source 2: National Weather Service

== Demographics ==
Historical population
Census	Pop.	Note	%±
1890	495		—
1910	1,842		—
1920	1,425		−22.6%
1930	2,093		46.9%
1940	2,338		11.7%
1950	2,708		15.8%
1960	2,890		6.7%
1970	2,615		−9.5%
1980	2,831		8.3%
1990	2,644		−6.6%
2000	2,556		−3.3%
2010	2,430		−4.9%
2020	2,294		−5.6%
U.S. Decennial Census

=== 2020 census ===
As of the 2020 census, 2,294 people, 845 households, and 532 families resided in Anson. The median age was 38.4 years; 27.0% of residents were under 18 and 19.0% were 65 or older. For every 100 females, there were 94.1 males, and for every 100 females 18 and over, there were 89.6 males 18 and over.

None of the residents lived in urban areas, while 100.0% lived in rural areas.

Of those households, 34.9% had children under 18 living in them, 45.9% were married-couple households, 18.9% were households with a male householder and no spouse or partner present, and 29.5% were households with a female householder and no spouse or partner present. About 26.0% of all households were made up of individuals and 14.2% had someone living alone who was 65 or older.

The city had 1,034 housing units, of which 18.3% were vacant. Among occupied housing units, 72.3% were owner-occupied and 27.7% were renter-occupied. The homeowner vacancy rate was 1.0% and the rental vacancy rate was 13.7%.

Racial composition as of the 2020 census
Race	Percent
White	70.1%
Black or African American	2.3%
American Indian and Alaska Native	0.9%
Asian	0.6%
Some other race	10.7%
Two or more races	15.3%
Hispanic or Latino (of any race)	38.2%

=== 2000 census ===
As of the census of 2000, 2,556 people, 950 households, and 681 families resided in the city. The population density was 1,219.2 inhabitants per square mile (470.7/km^{2}). The 1,089 housing units had an average density of 519.5 per square mile (200.6/km^{2}). The racial makeup of the city was 75.82% White, 2.78% African American, 0.47% Native American, 0.74% Asian, 18.62% from other races, and 1.56% from two or more races. Hispanics or Latinos of any race were 32.63% of the population.

Of the 950 households, 35.2% had children under 18 living with them, 51.8% were married couples living together, 16.1% had a female householder with no husband present, and 28.3% were not families. About 26.6% of all households were made up of individuals, and 18.0% had someone living alone who was 65 or older. The average household size was 2.57, and the average family size was 3.10.

In the city, the age distribution was 28.3% under 18, 7.8% from 18 to 24, 24.2% from 25 to 44, 19.0% from 45 to 64, and 20.7% who were 65 or older. The median age was 37 years. For every 100 females, there were 86.0 males. For every 100 females 18 and over, there were 79.0 males.

The median income in the city for a household was $23,954 and for a family was $30,284. Males had a median income of $26,893 versus $19,038 for females. The per capita income for the city was $11,798. About 17.0% of families and 19.8% of the population were below the poverty line, including 25.0% of those under 18 and 18.8% of those 65 or over.

== Traditions ==
Anson is home to the Texas Cowboys' Christmas Ball, a three-night event held the weekend before Christmas. The first ball was held by M.G. Rhodes at his Star Hotel in Anson in 1885 and annually thereafter until 1890, when the hotel burned down. The event happened sporadically until it faded away during Prohibition. Teacher and folklorist Leonora Barrett revived the event in 1940. The dance was (and still is) held in Pioneer Hall, a Works Progress Administration project from the Great Depression. Music is usually provided by Michael Martin Murphey and his band.

Anson also may or may not have been the inspiration for the movie Footloose (1984), and as of 1987, still had an enforced "no dancing" law on the books that is/was only lifted for the annual Christmas dance. An effort was made in 1987 to change the ordinance to allow supervised dancing, which was successful. The conflict was the basis for the book, No Dancin' in Anson: An American Story of Race and Social Change, by University of Texas professor Ricardo Ainslie.

== Education ==
The city is served by the Anson Independent School District and is home to the Anson High School Tigers.

== Notable people ==
- Omar Burleson, late U.S. representative, was born in Anson.
- Greg Glazner, Walt Whitman Award-winning poet, was born in Anson.
- Jeannie C. Riley, country singer, was born in Anson.

== Gallery ==
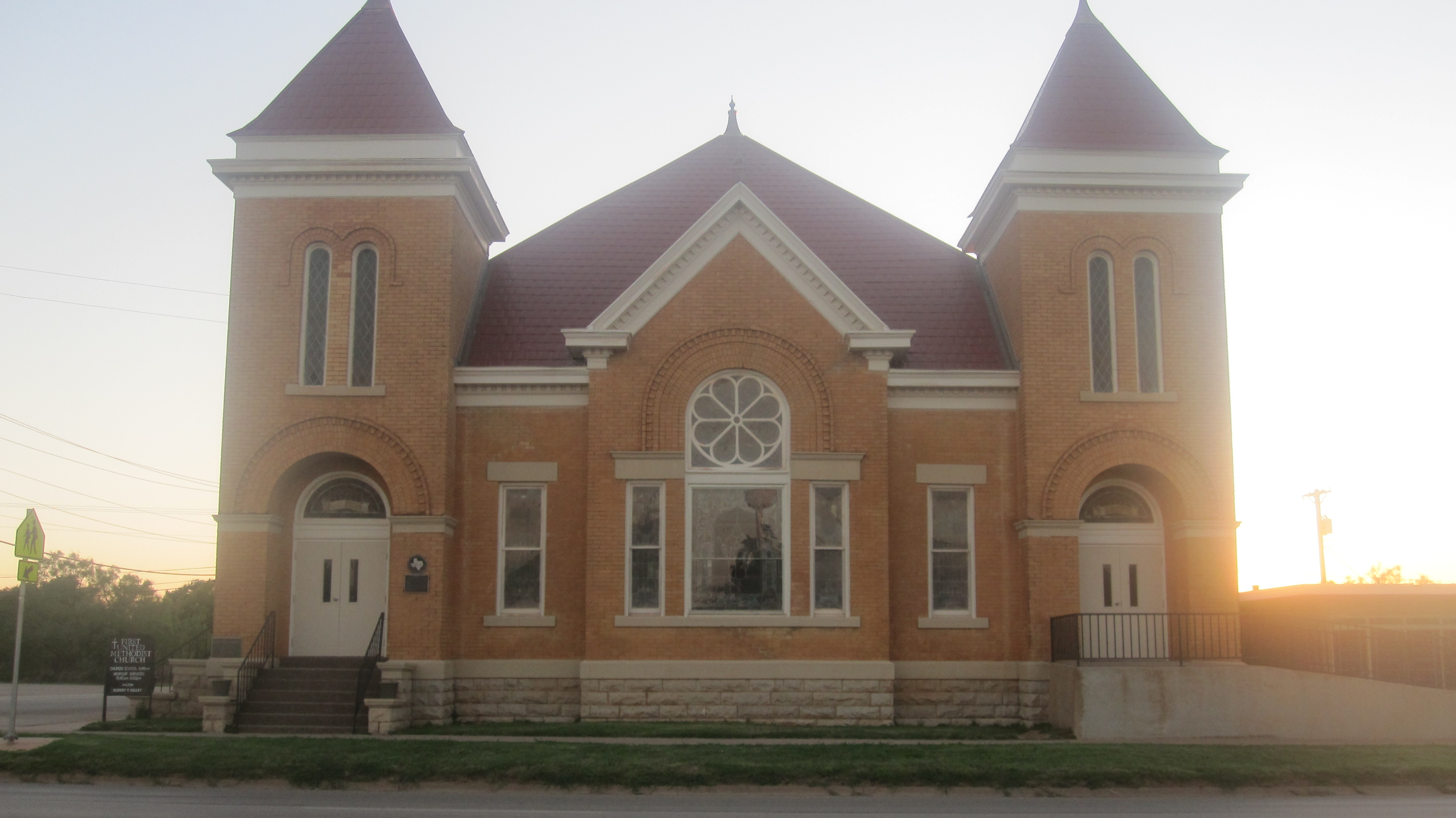
Historic First United Methodist Church in Anson, Texas

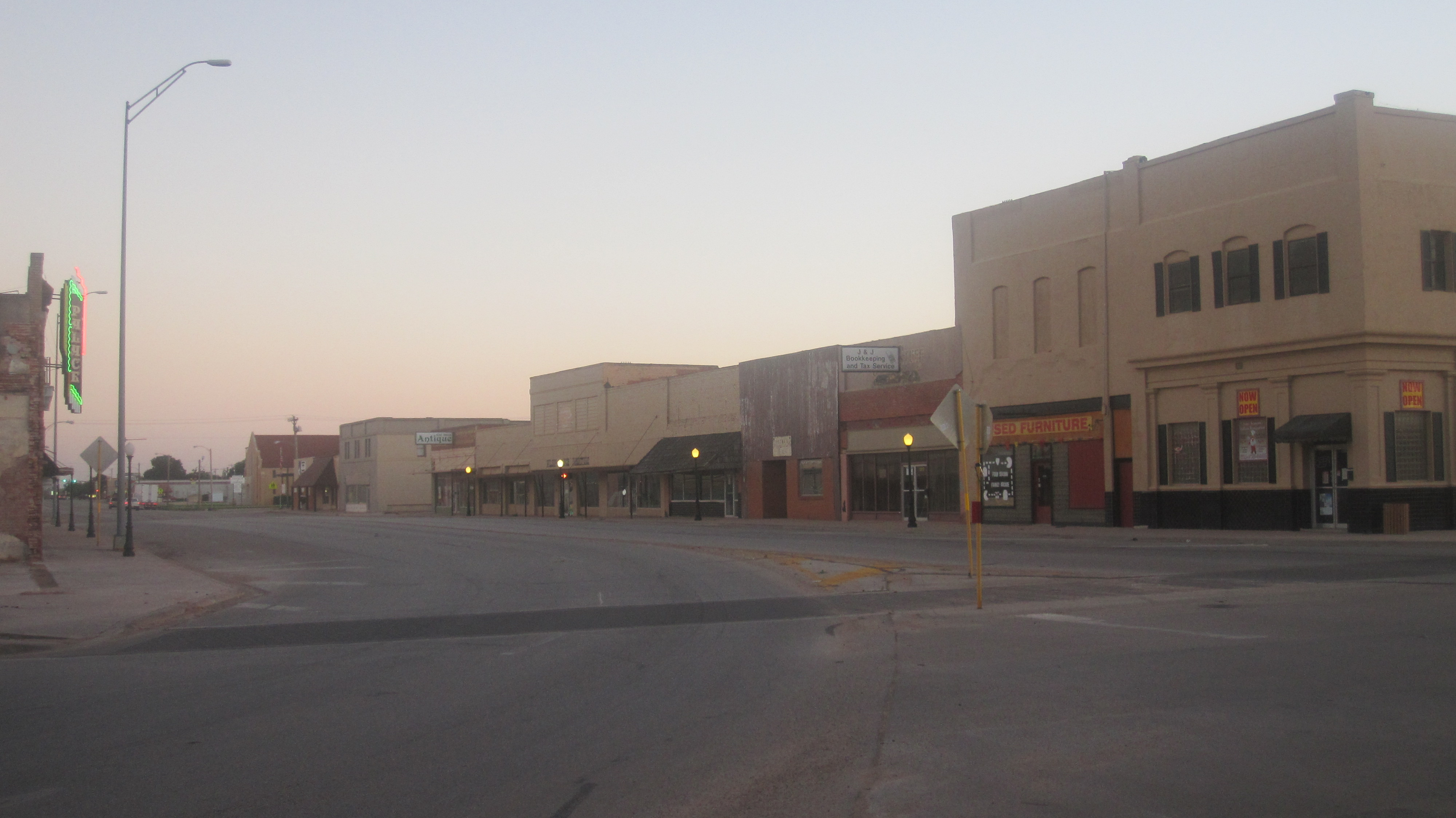
Downtown Anson south of the courthouse at sunset

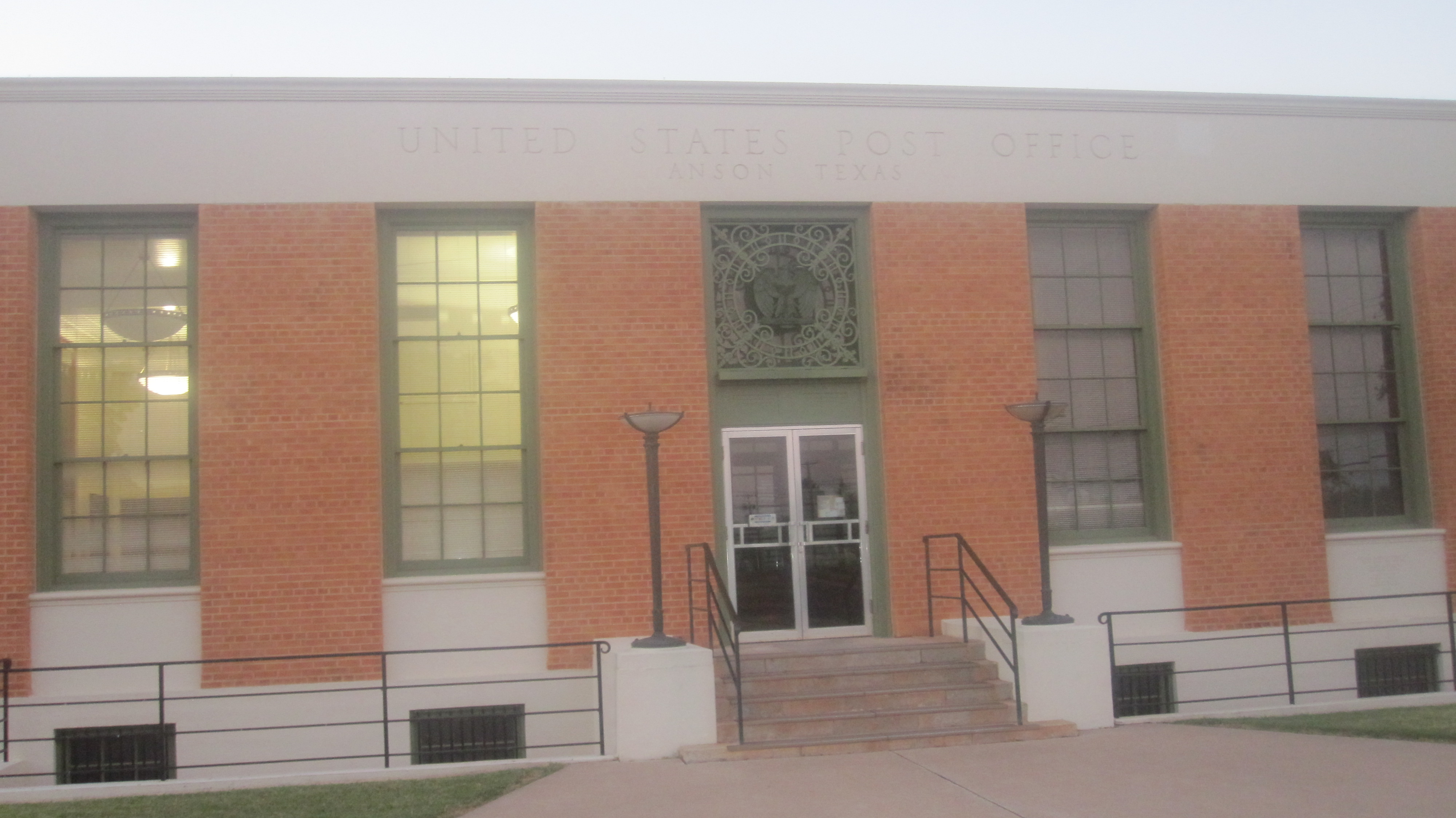
U.S. Post Office in Anson

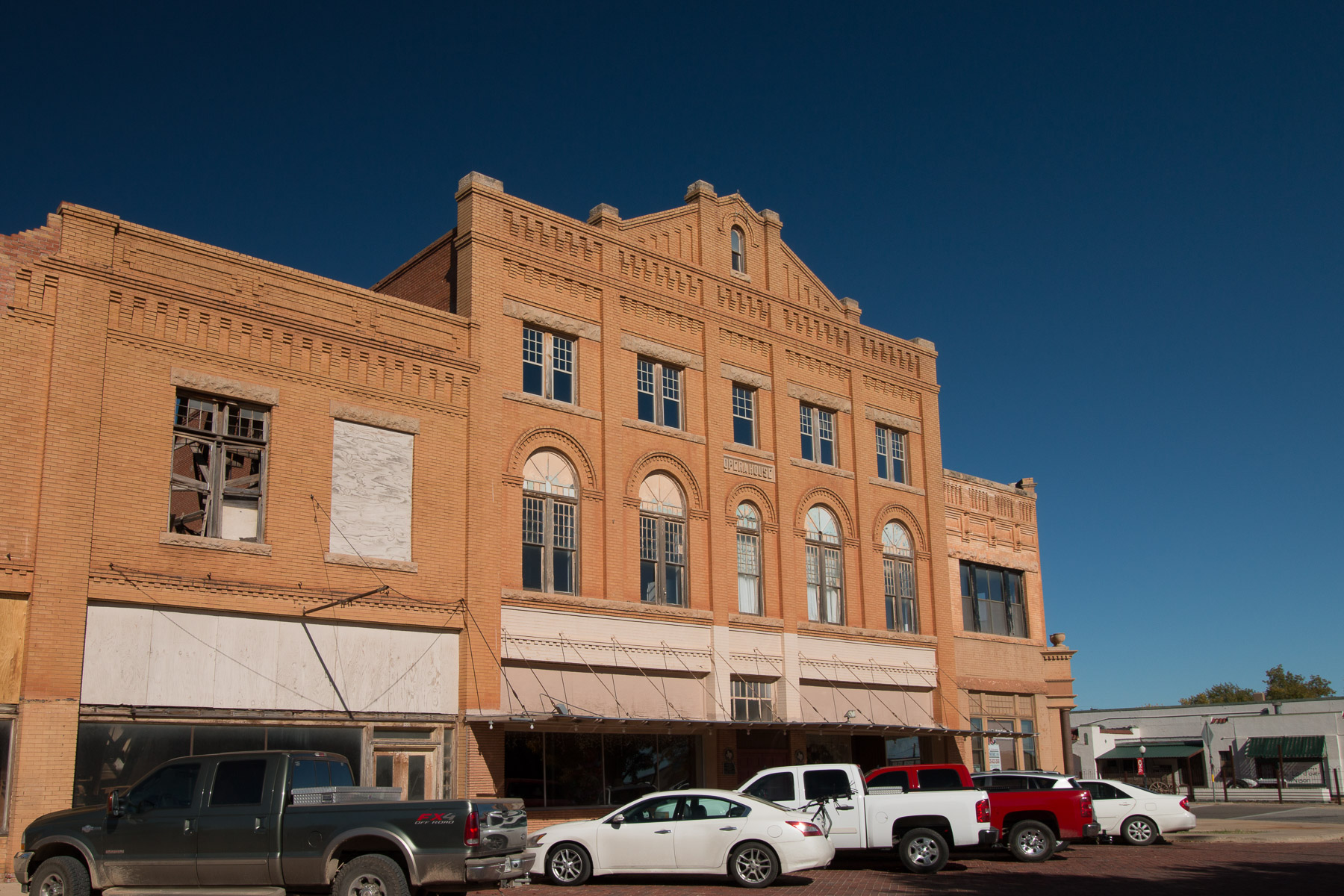
Opera house
