= Scurry County, Texas =

County in Texas, United States

- County
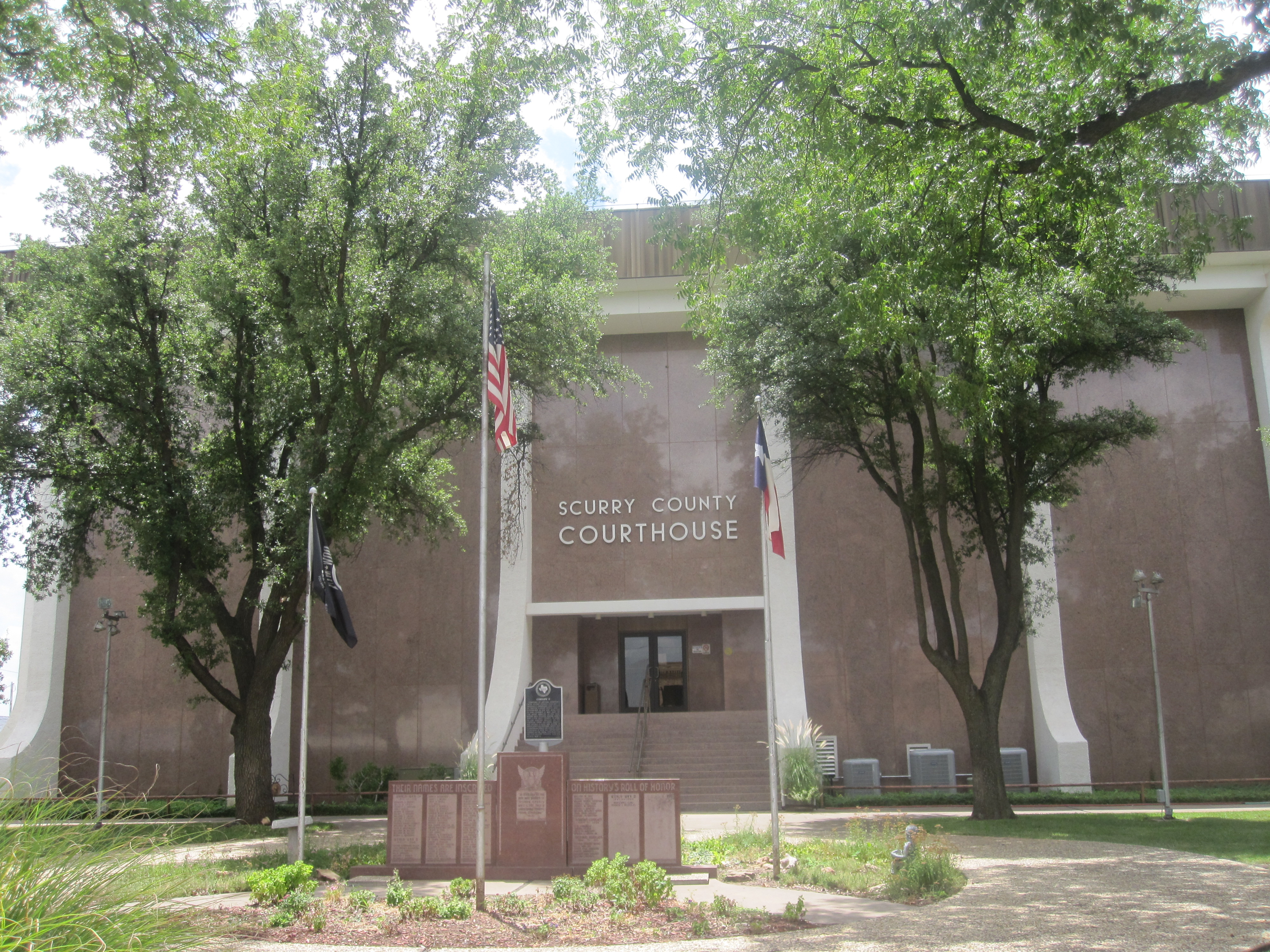
- Scurry County Courthouse in Snyder

- Location within the U.S. state of Texas
- Coordinates: 32°45′N 100°55′W
- Country: United States
- State: Texas
- Founded: 1884
- Named for: William Read Scurry
- Seat: Snyder
- Largest city: Snyder

Area
  - Total: 908 sq mi (2,350 km^{2})
  - Land: 905 sq mi (2,340 km^{2})
  - Water: 2.1 sq mi (5.4 km^{2}) 0.2%

Population (2020)
  - Total: 16,932
  - Estimate (2025): 16,162 ▼
  - Density: 18.7/sq mi (7.22/km^{2})
- Time zone: UTC−6 (Central)
  - Summer (DST): UTC−5 (CDT)
- Congressional district: 19th
- Website: www.co.scurry.tx.us

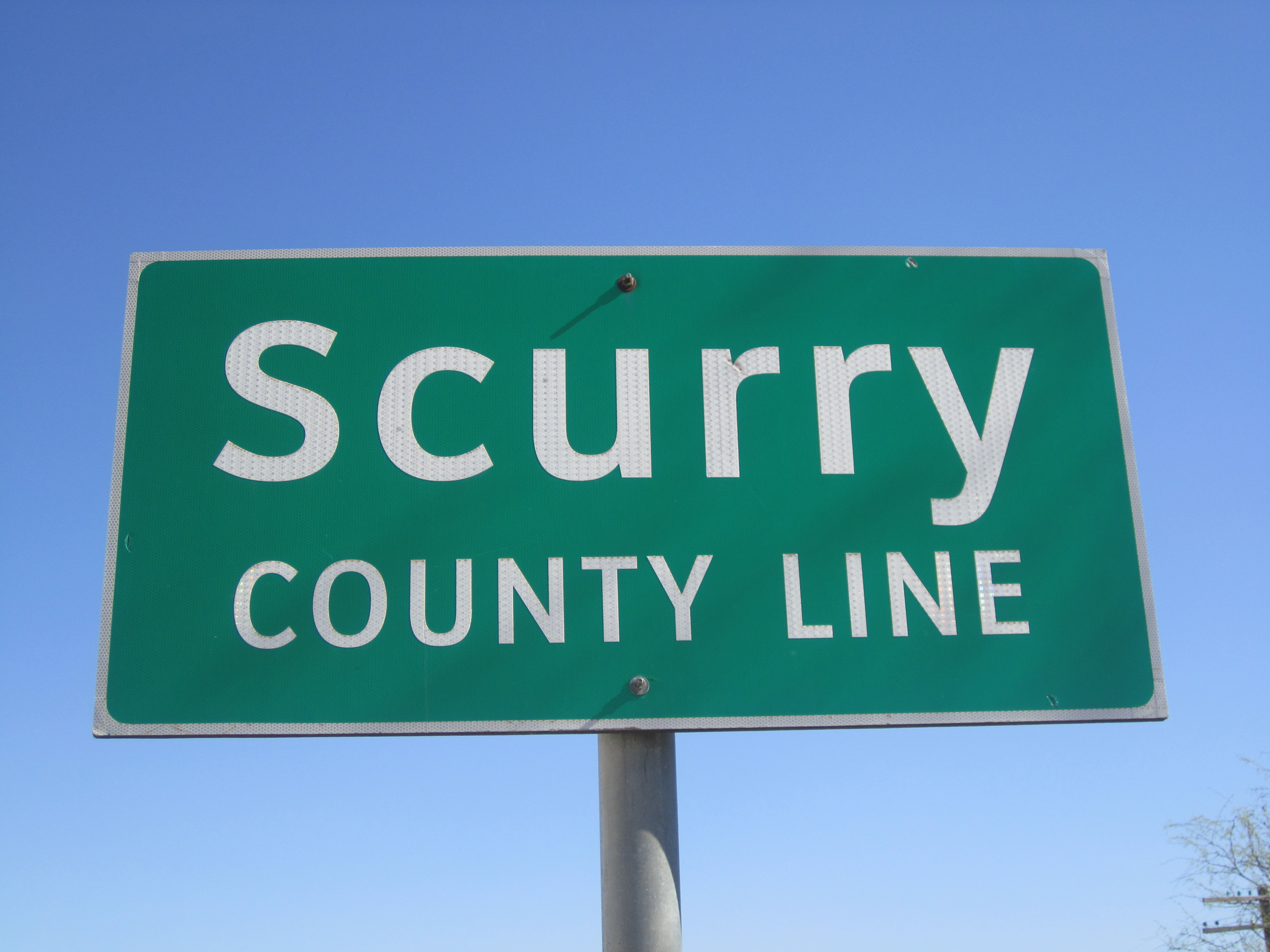
Scurry County marker

Scurry County is a county located in the U.S. state of Texas. As of the 2020 census, its population was 16,932. Its county seat is Snyder, which is the home of Western Texas College. Scurry County is named for Confederate General William Scurry. The county was created in 1876 and organized in 1884. Scurry County was one of 46 prohibition, or entirely dry counties, in Texas, until a 2006 election approved the sale of beer and wine in Snyder, and a 2008 election approved the sale of liquor by the drink throughout the county.

Scurry County comprises the Snyder, Texas, micropolitan statistical area.

== History ==
This county, lying directly north of Mitchell County, was created in 1876, and was organized June 28, 1884. It was named for William Read Scurry, lawyer and Confederate Army general. Until 1909, it was without railroad facilities, and the nearest shipping points were Colorado City to the south and still later the railroad towns in Fisher County to the east.

The first railroad was the Roscoe, Snyder and Pacific Railway, built from Roscoe on the Texas & Pacific in Nolan County, to Snyder, the county seat of Scurry County, about 1909, and subsequently extended to Fluvanna, also in Scurry County. In 1911, the Texico-Coleman division of the Santa Fe system was built through the county, giving it a trunk line of railway. Development has been particularly rapid during the early 1900s.

Some of the important pioneer facts concerning Scurry County are found in a sketch of W. H. Snyder, after whom the county seat town was named. In 1877, he opened a trading camp in the county, hauling lumber on wagons from Dallas to build his store and also hauling a good portion of his goods from the same place. He used what was known as trail wagons, with seven yoke of oxen to a team, each wagon having a capacity of 50,000 pounds. Mr. Snyder erected a house in Scurry County and began dealing in general merchandise and supplies for buffalo hunters. Other parties moved into the same locality, and that was the beginning of the town of Snyder.

In 1882, Mr. Snyder laid out the town, and two years later, it became the county seat. Snyder has had an enterprising citizenship, and 10 years later had an independent school district and four churches and was an important center for trade.

Its importance has greatly increased since the coming of the railway, and in 1910, its population was 2,154. Other towns have sprung up along the railway, the most important of which is Fluvanna, at the terminus of the Roscoe, Snyder & Pacific, and Hermleigh.

== Geography ==
According to the U.S. Census Bureau, the county has a total area of 908 square miles (2,350 km^{2}), of which 905 square miles (2,340 km^{2}) are land and 2.1 square miles (5.4 km^{2}) (0.2%) are covered by water.

Since 1952, Lake J. B. Thomas has operated in Scurry County covering up to 2,947 hectares (7,282 acres) when filled to the spillway at an elevation of 2,258 ft (688 m) above sea level.

=== Major highways ===
- U.S. Highway 84
- U.S. Highway 180
- State Highway 208
- State Highway 350

=== Adjacent counties ===
- Kent County (north)
- Fisher County (east)
- Mitchell County (south)
- Borden County (west)
- Garza County (northwest)

== Demographics ==
Historical population
Census	Pop.	Note	%±
1880	102		—
1890	1,415		1,287.3%
1900	4,158		193.9%
1910	10,924		162.7%
1920	9,003		−17.6%
1930	12,188		35.4%
1940	11,545		−5.3%
1950	22,779		97.3%
1960	20,369		−10.6%
1970	15,760		−22.6%
1980	18,192		15.4%
1990	18,634		2.4%
2000	16,361		−12.2%
2010	16,921		3.4%
2020	16,932		0.1%
2025 (est.)	16,162	▼	−4.5%
U.S. Decennial Census; 1850–2010 2010 2020

=== Racial and ethnic composition ===
Scurry County, Texas – Racial and ethnic composition Note: the US Census treats Hispanic/Latino as an ethnic category. This table excludes Latinos from the racial categories and assigns them to a separate category. Hispanics/Latinos may be of any race.
Race / Ethnicity (NH = Non-Hispanic)	Pop 2000	Pop 2010	Pop 2020	% 2000	% 2010	% 2020
White alone (NH)	10,672	9,773	8,637	65.23%	57.76%	51.01%
Black or African American alone (NH)	984	764	599	6.01%	4.52%	3.54%
Native American or Alaska Native alone (NH)	50	47	60	0.31%	0.28%	0.35%
Asian alone (NH)	36	48	82	0.22%	0.28%	0.48%
Pacific Islander alone (NH)	0	2	5	0.00%	0.01%	0.03%
Other race alone (NH)	1	12	27	0.01%	0.07%	0.16%
Mixed race or Multiracial (NH)	74	126	383	0.45%	0.74%	2.26%
Hispanic or Latino (any race)	4,544	6,149	7,139	27.77%	36.34%	42.16%
Total	16,361	16,921	16,932	100.00%	100.00%	100.00%

=== 2020 census ===
As of the 2020 census, the county had a population of 16,932. The median age was 36.6 years; 25.3% of residents were under 18 and 15.5% were 65 or older. For every 100 females, there were 111.7 males, and for every 100 females 18 and over, there were 113.4 males 18 and over.

The racial makeup of the county was 64.2% White, 3.8% Black or African American, 0.7% American Indian and Alaska Native, 0.5% Asian, <0.1% Native Hawaiian and Pacific Islander, 16.8% from some other race, and 14.0% from two or more races. Hispanic or Latino residents of any race comprised 42.2% of the population.

About 68.2% of residents lived in urban areas, while 31.8% lived in rural areas.

Of the 5,925 households in the county, 35.7% had children under 18 living in them, 51.1% were married-couple households, 18.6% were households with a male householder and no spouse or partner present, and 24.8% were households with a female householder and no spouse or partner present. About 26.6% of all households were made up of individuals, and 12.5% had someone living alone who was 65 or older.

The county had 6,889 housing units, of which 14.0% were vacant. Among occupied housing units, 71.7% were owner-occupied and 28.3% were renter-occupied. The homeowner vacancy rate was 2.6% and the rental vacancy rate was 14.4%.

=== 2000 census ===
As of the census of 2000, 16,361 people, 5,756 households, and 4,161 families resided in the county. The population density was 18 people per square mile (6.9 people/km^{2}). The 7,112 housing units averaged 8 units per square mile (3.1 units/km^{2}). The racial makeup of the county was 81.27% White, 6.06% Black or African American, 0.53% Native American, 0.23% Asian, 10.51% from other races, and 1.41% from two or more races. About 27.77% of the population were Hispanic or Latino of any race.

Of the 5,756 households, 33.9% had children under 18 living with them, 58.4% were married couples living together, 10.4% had a female householder with no husband present, and 27.7% were not families; 25.1% of all households were made up of individuals, and 12.9% had someone living alone who was 65 or older. The average household size was 2.55, and the average family size was 3.05.

In the county, the population was distributed as 25.2% under 18, 10.7% from 18 to 24, 26.2% from 25 to 44, 22.4% from 45 to 64, and 15.4% who were 65 or older. The median age was 37 years. For every 100 females, there were 107.8 males. For every 100 females 18 and over, there were 109.5 males.

The median income in the county for a household was $31,646 and for a family was $38,467. Males had a median income of $30,399 versus $18,061 for females. The per capita income for the county was $15,871. About 12.60% of families and 16.00% of the population were below the poverty line, including 21.60% of those under 18 and 11.70% of those 65 or over.

== Communities ==
=== City ===
- Snyder (county seat)

=== Census-designated place ===
- Fluvanna
- Hermleigh

=== Unincorporated communities ===
- Dunn
- Ira

=== Ghost town ===
- Pyron

== Politics ==
Scurry County is located within District 83 of the Texas House of Representatives. Scurry County is located within District 31 of the Texas Senate.

United States presidential election results for Scurry County, Texas
Year	Republican		Democratic		Third party(ies)	
Year	No.	%	No.	%	No.	%
1912	31	3.81%	661	81.20%	122	14.99%
1916	40	3.59%	994	89.15%	81	7.26%
1920	151	15.01%	801	79.62%	54	5.37%
1924	269	16.71%	1,292	80.25%	49	3.04%
1928	1,597	77.49%	462	22.42%	2	0.10%
1932	105	6.14%	1,604	93.75%	2	0.12%
1936	162	8.47%	1,746	91.32%	4	0.21%
1940	280	10.84%	2,303	89.16%	0	0.00%
1944	285	13.10%	1,761	80.93%	130	5.97%
1948	201	8.71%	2,040	88.39%	67	2.90%
1952	2,620	51.37%	2,480	48.63%	0	0.00%
1956	2,250	45.46%	2,691	54.37%	8	0.16%
1960	2,235	42.25%	3,020	57.09%	35	0.66%
1964	1,741	33.89%	3,381	65.82%	15	0.29%
1968	1,745	35.90%	2,031	41.78%	1,085	22.32%
1972	3,777	74.79%	1,223	24.22%	50	0.99%
1976	2,797	51.24%	2,639	48.34%	23	0.42%
1980	3,745	64.06%	2,003	34.26%	98	1.68%
1984	5,028	75.85%	1,564	23.59%	37	0.56%
1988	3,749	63.61%	2,119	35.95%	26	0.44%
1992	2,670	43.62%	1,609	26.29%	1,842	30.09%
1996	2,929	49.95%	2,099	35.79%	836	14.26%
2000	4,060	76.23%	1,193	22.40%	73	1.37%
2004	4,576	82.12%	981	17.61%	15	0.27%
2008	4,414	79.26%	1,088	19.54%	67	1.20%
2012	4,124	82.04%	838	16.67%	65	1.29%
2016	4,410	83.02%	733	13.80%	169	3.18%
2020	4,983	84.74%	818	13.91%	79	1.34%
2024	4,945	86.44%	734	12.83%	42	0.73%

United States Senate election results for Scurry County, Texas1
Year	Republican		Democratic		Third party(ies)	
Year	No.	%	No.	%	No.	%
2024	4,683	83.16%	811	14.40%	137	2.43%

United States Senate election results for Scurry County, Texas2
Year	Republican		Democratic		Third party(ies)	
Year	No.	%	No.	%	No.	%
2020	4,870	84.01%	805	13.89%	122	2.10%

Texas Gubernatorial election results for Scurry County
Year	Republican		Democratic		Third party(ies)	
Year	No.	%	No.	%	No.	%
2022	3,607	87.38%	480	11.63%	41	0.99%

== Education ==
School districts in the county include:

- Colorado Independent School District
- Hermleigh Independent School District
- Ira Independent School District
- Roscoe Collegiate Independent School District
- Snyder Independent School District

The Texas Legislature designated the county as being in the Western Texas College District.

== Gallery ==
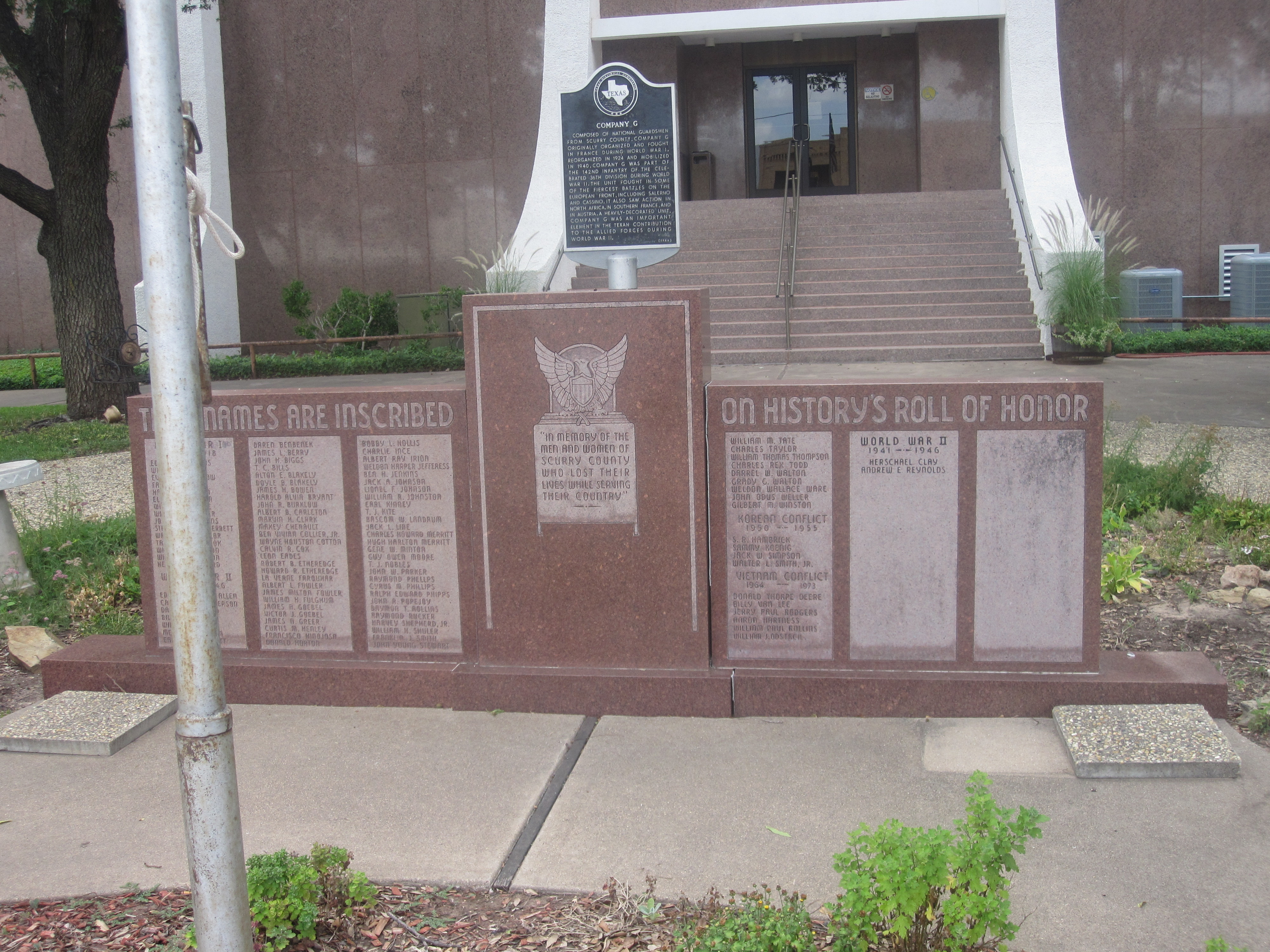
Veterans Monument at the Scurry County Courthouse

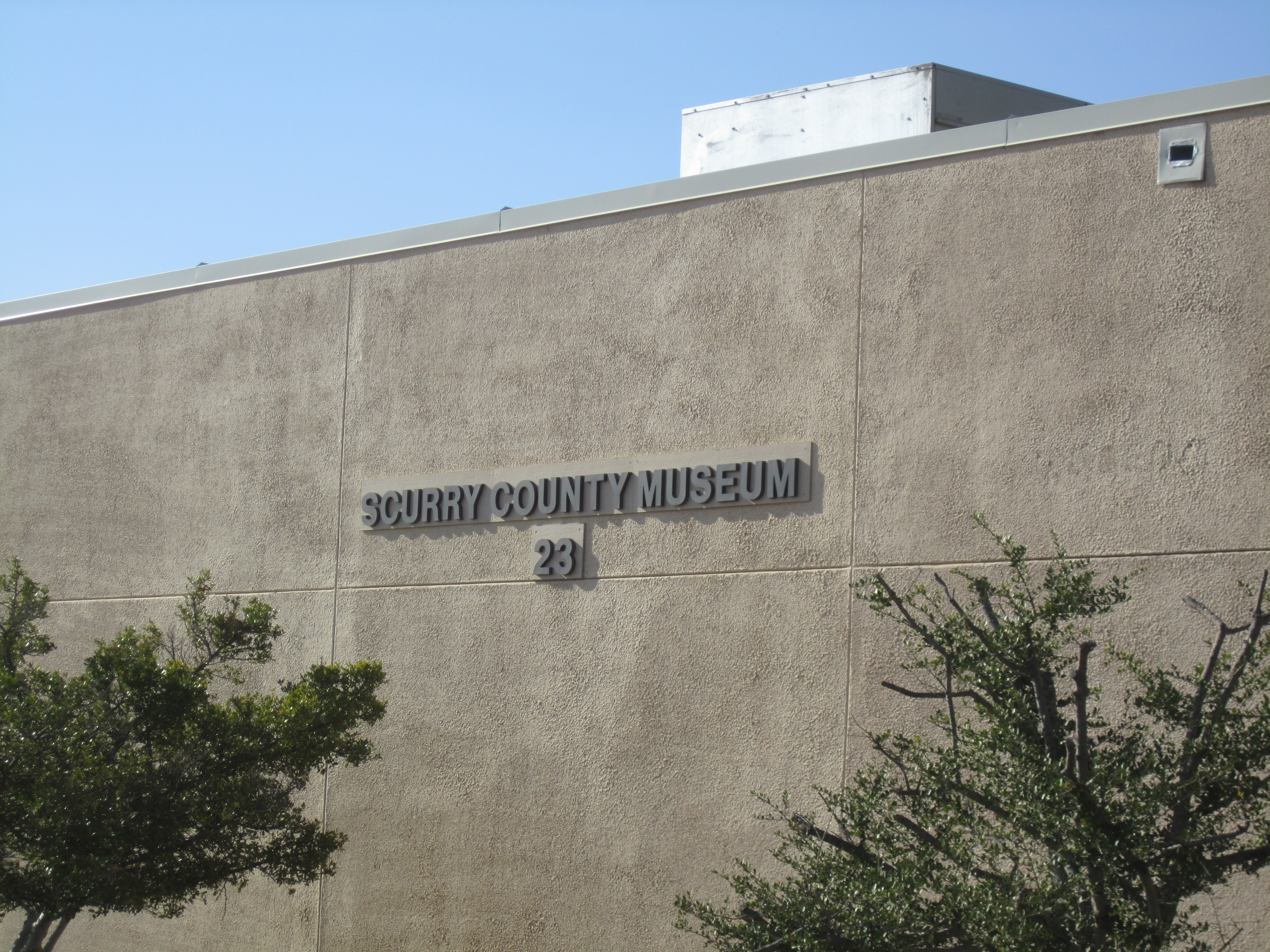
Scurry County Museum is located on the campus of Western Texas College in Snyder.

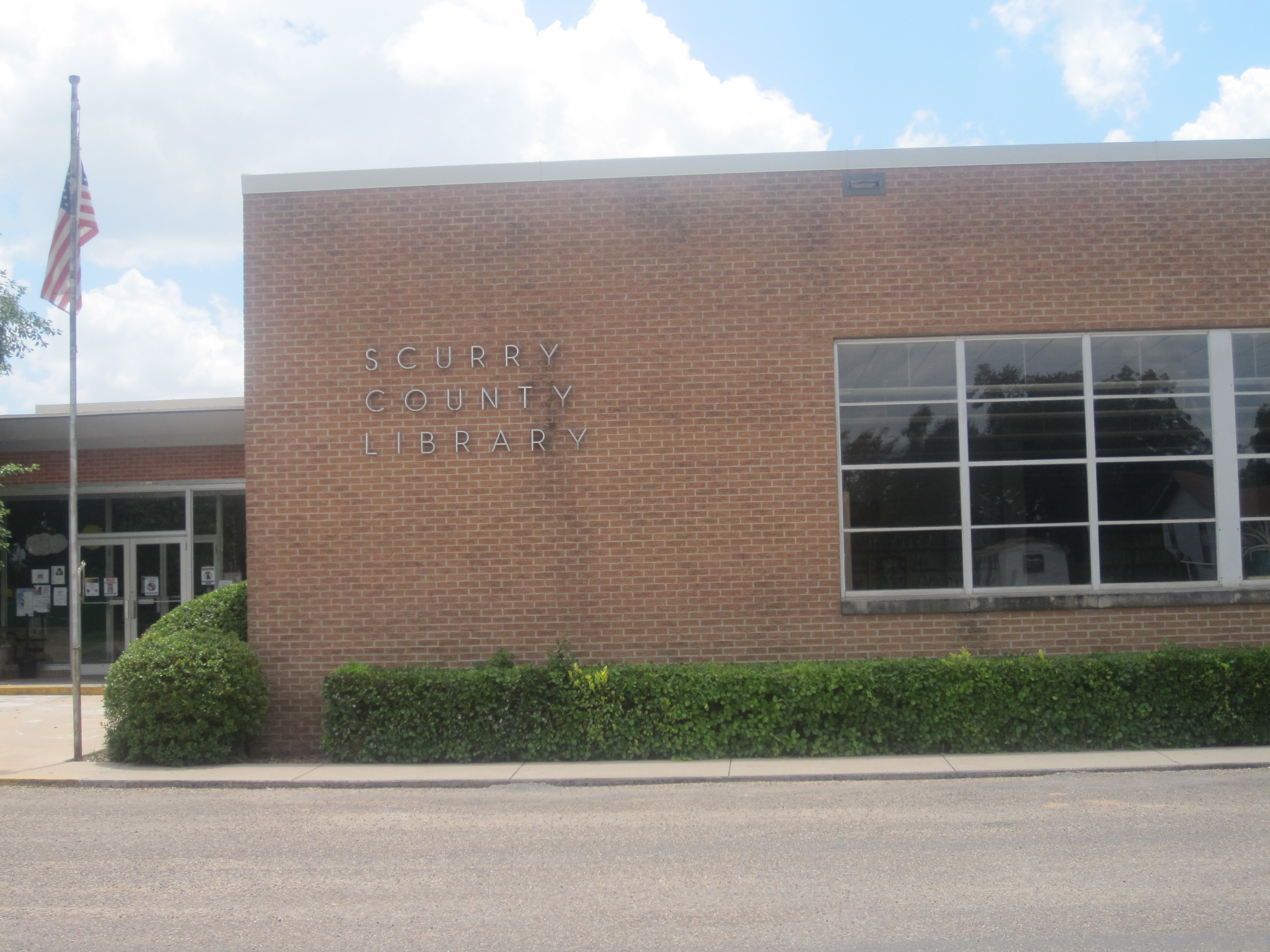
Scurry County Library in Snyder

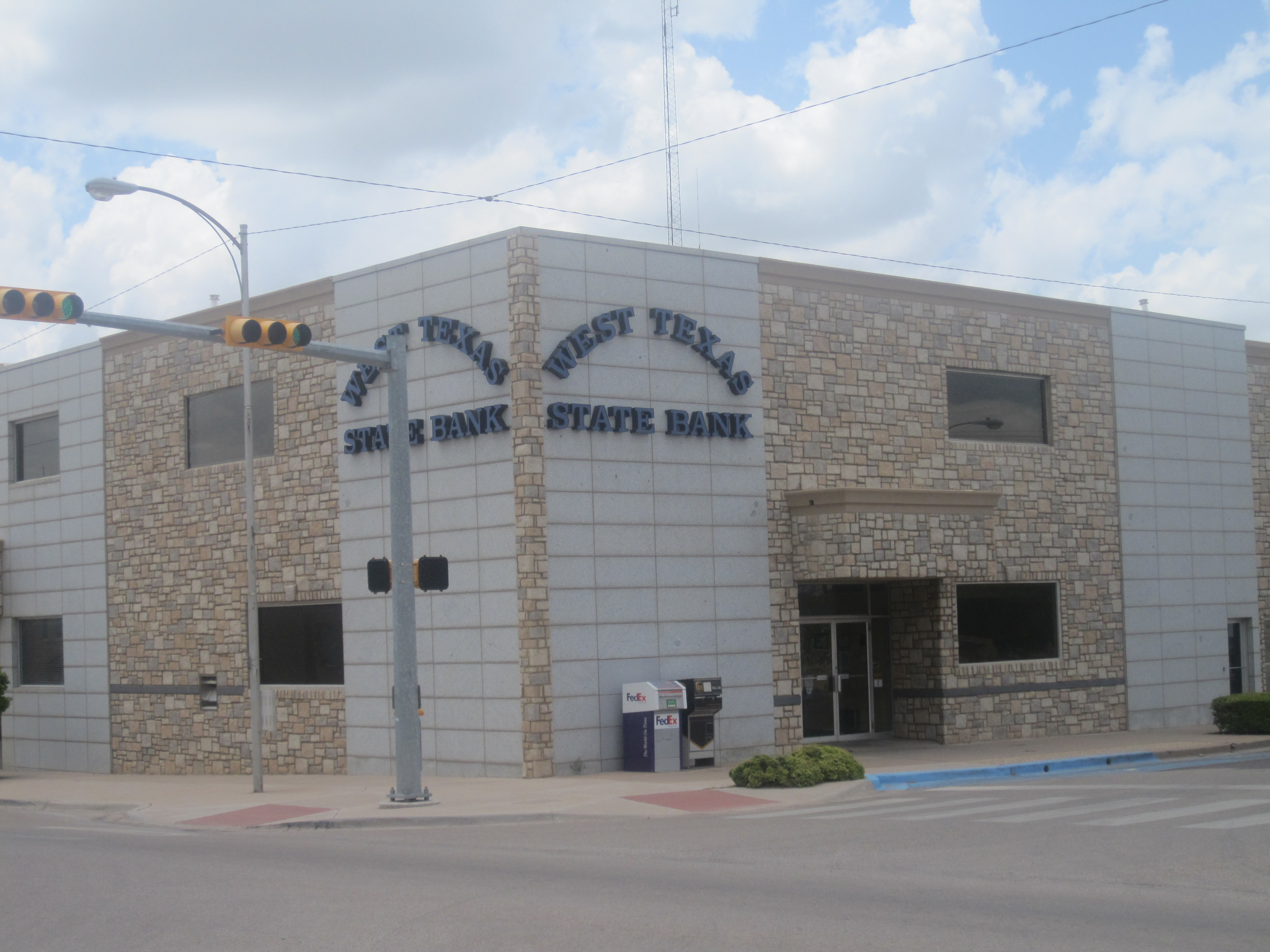
West Texas State Bank in Snyder serves Scurry County.

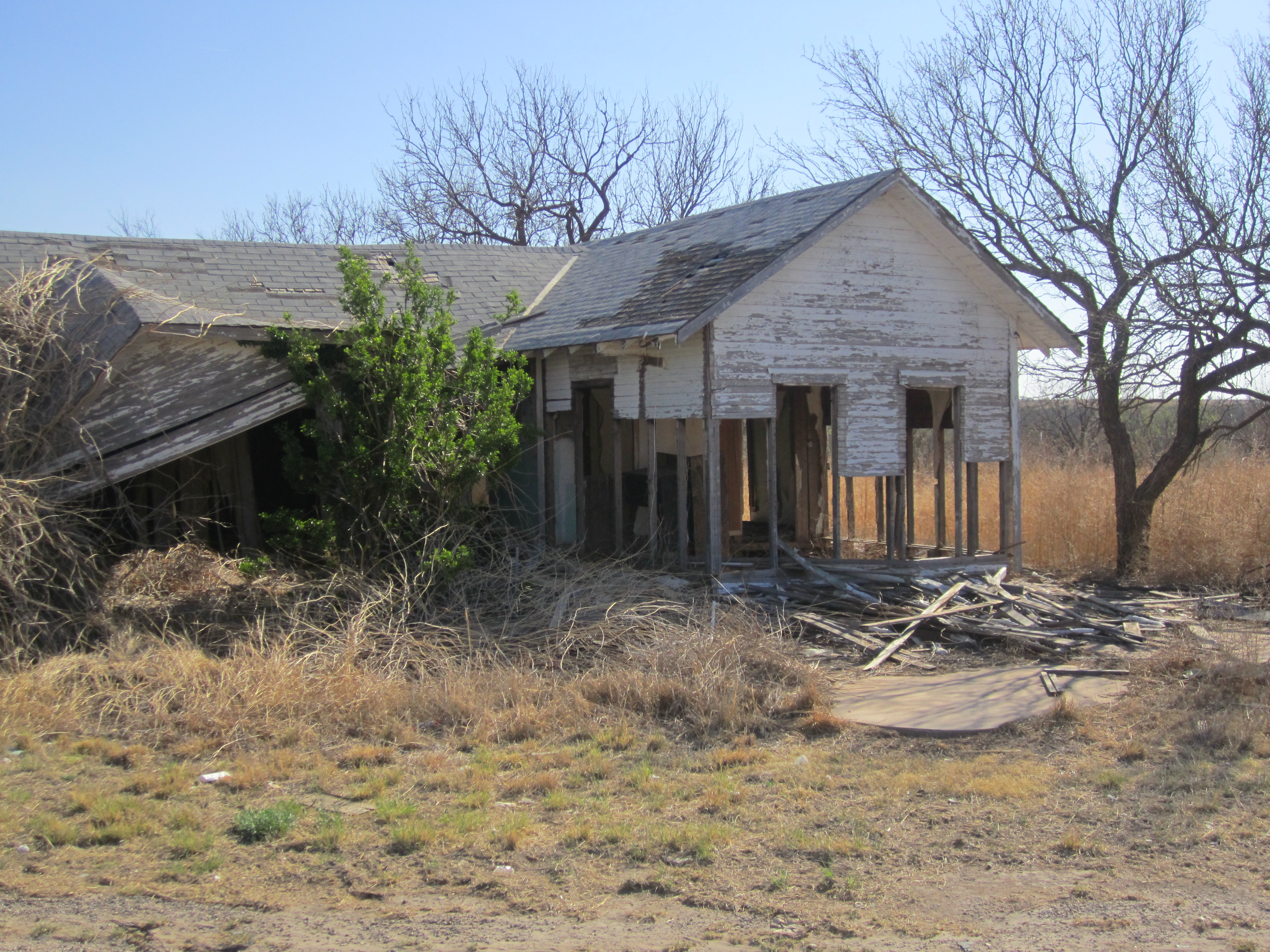
Abandoned buildings, such as this one located off US Route 84 in northern Scurry County, are seen throughout the South Plains. This building was the Dermott Post Office located in Dermott, Scurry County, Texas. It had an attached home for the postmaster.

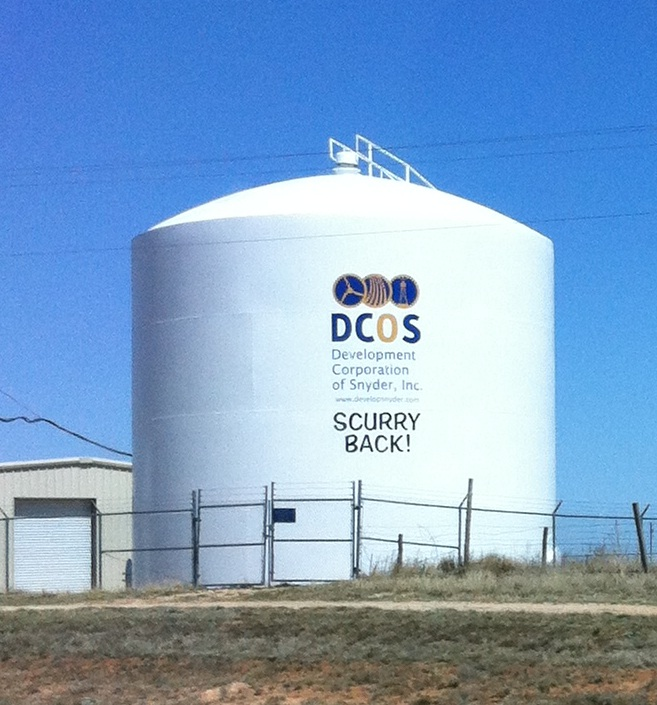
Water tank in Scurry County, Texas, near Snyder, on north side of Hwy 84

== See also ==
- Recorded Texas Historic Landmarks in Scurry County
