= Wastella, Texas =

- Ghost town
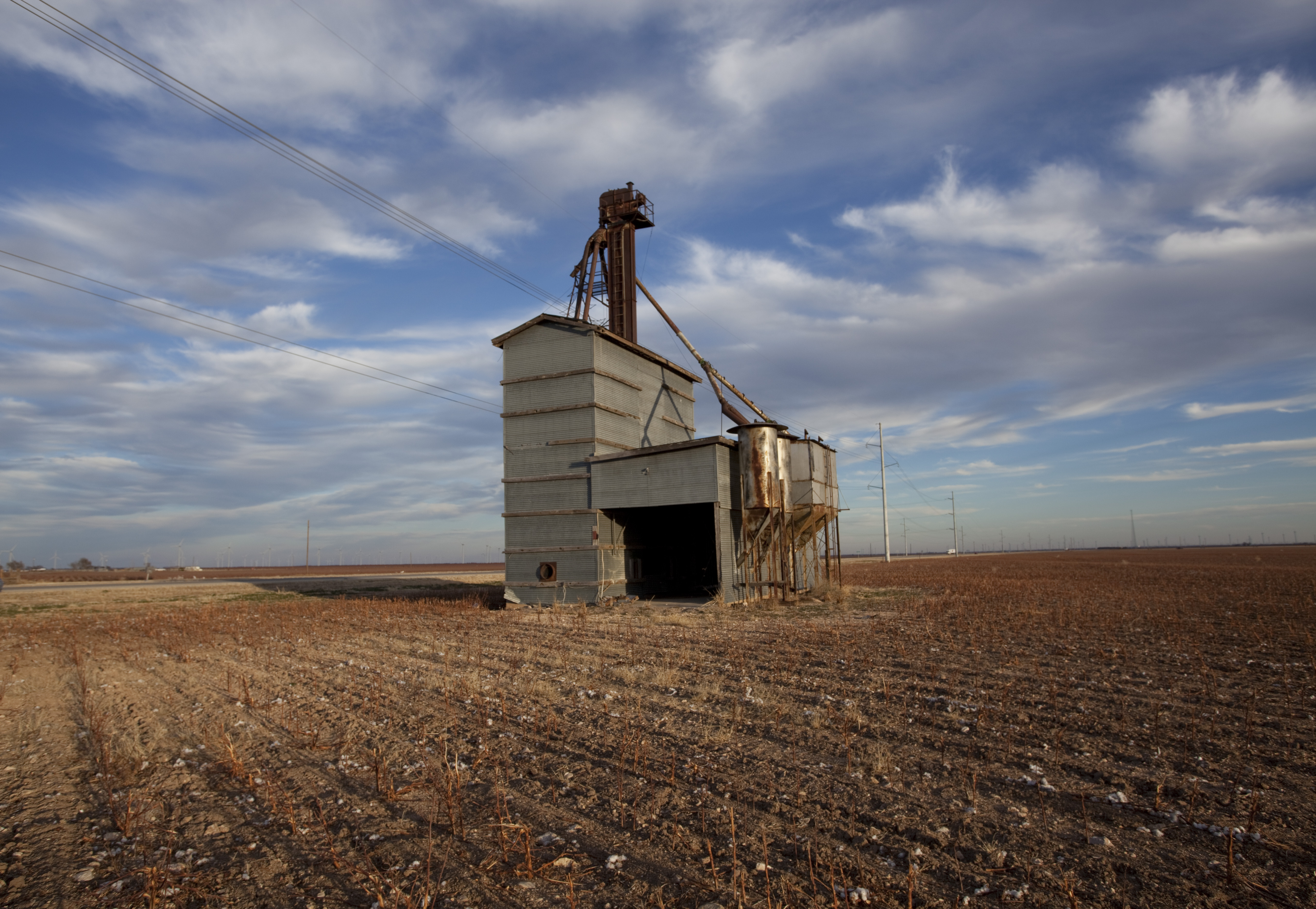
- Wastella Granary

- Location within Texas Location within the United States
- Coordinates: 32°30′37″N 100°38′58″W
- Country: United States
- State: Texas
- County: Nolan
- Region: West Texas
- Platted: 1908
- Founder: Will Neeley
- Elevation: 2,392 ft (729 m)
- Time zone: UTC-6 (CST)
- Area code: 806
- GNIS feature ID: 1379241

Wastella is a ghost town in northwestern Nolan County, Texas, United States. It is located at the intersection of U.S. Highway 84 and Farm to Market Road 1982, approximately 8 mi (13 km) northwest of Roscoe. It lies within the physiographic region known as the Rolling Plains, to the southeast of the high plains of the Llano Estacado.

== History ==
Wastella was platted eight miles northwest of Roscoe on land provided by Will Neeley when the Roscoe, Snyder and Pacific Railway was constructed in 1908. Neely named the town site for his eldest daughter, Wastella.

Wastella grew slowly and was never very large, but at one time it had a few stores, a hotel, a school, and a post office that opened in 1907. Despite its key location along the Roscoe, Snyder and Pacific Railway, Wastella suffered from its close proximity to more significant towns such as Snyder, Roscoe, and Hermleigh. The post office closed in the early 1930s. In 1980 and 1990, the population was 13, and the population dropped to only four in 2000.

== See also ==
- Clear Fork Brazos River
- Brazos Wind Ranch
- Roscoe Wind Farm
