= Al Milch =

American football coach

Biographical details
- Born: November 30, 1919; Norfolk, Virginia, U.S.
- Died: November 3, 2010 (aged 90); Early, Texas, U.S.

Playing career

Football
- 1946: Hardin–Simmons
- Position: Guard

Coaching career (HC unless noted)

Football
- 1947: Roscoe HS (TX)
- 1948–1950: Hardin–Simmons (assistant)
- 1951: Arlington State
- 1952–1956: Sul Ross

Football
- 1948–?: Hardin–Simmons (freshmen)

Head coaching record
- Overall: 15–37 (college); 4–4–1 (junior college)

Alfred Wesley Milch (November 30, 1919 – November 3, 2010) was an American football coach. He was the seventh head football coach at Arlington State College—now known as the University of Texas at Arlington—serving for one season, in 1951, and compiling a record of 4–4–1.

Milch played college football at Hardin–Simmons University in Abilene, Texas as a guard and was named to the All-Border Conference team in 1946. He was the head coach at Roscoe High School in Roscoe, Texas in 1947. Milch returned to Hardin–Simmons in 1948 as freshmen football and basketball coach. He succeeded Klepto Holmes at head football coach at Arlington State in 1951.

Milch died on November 3, 2010, at his home in Early, Texas.

== Head coaching record ==
=== College ===
Year	Team	Overall	Conference	Standing	Bowl/playoffs
Sul Ross Lobos (Lone Star Conference) (1952–1956)
1952	Sul Ross	4–6	2–3	T–3rd	
1953	Sul Ross	4–7	1–4	5th	
1954	Sul Ross	4–7	1–5	T–6th	
1955	Sul Ross	2–8	0–6	7th	
1956	Sul Ross	1–9	0–6	7th	
Sul Ross:		15–37	4–24		
Total:		15–37			

=== Junior college ===
Year	Team	Overall	Conference	Standing	Bowl/playoffs
Arlington State Rebels (Pioneer Conference) (1951)
1951	Arlington State	4–4–1	1–2–1	T–3rd	
Arlington State:		4–4–1	1–2–1		
Total:		4–4–1			
