= Hermleigh, Texas =

- CDP
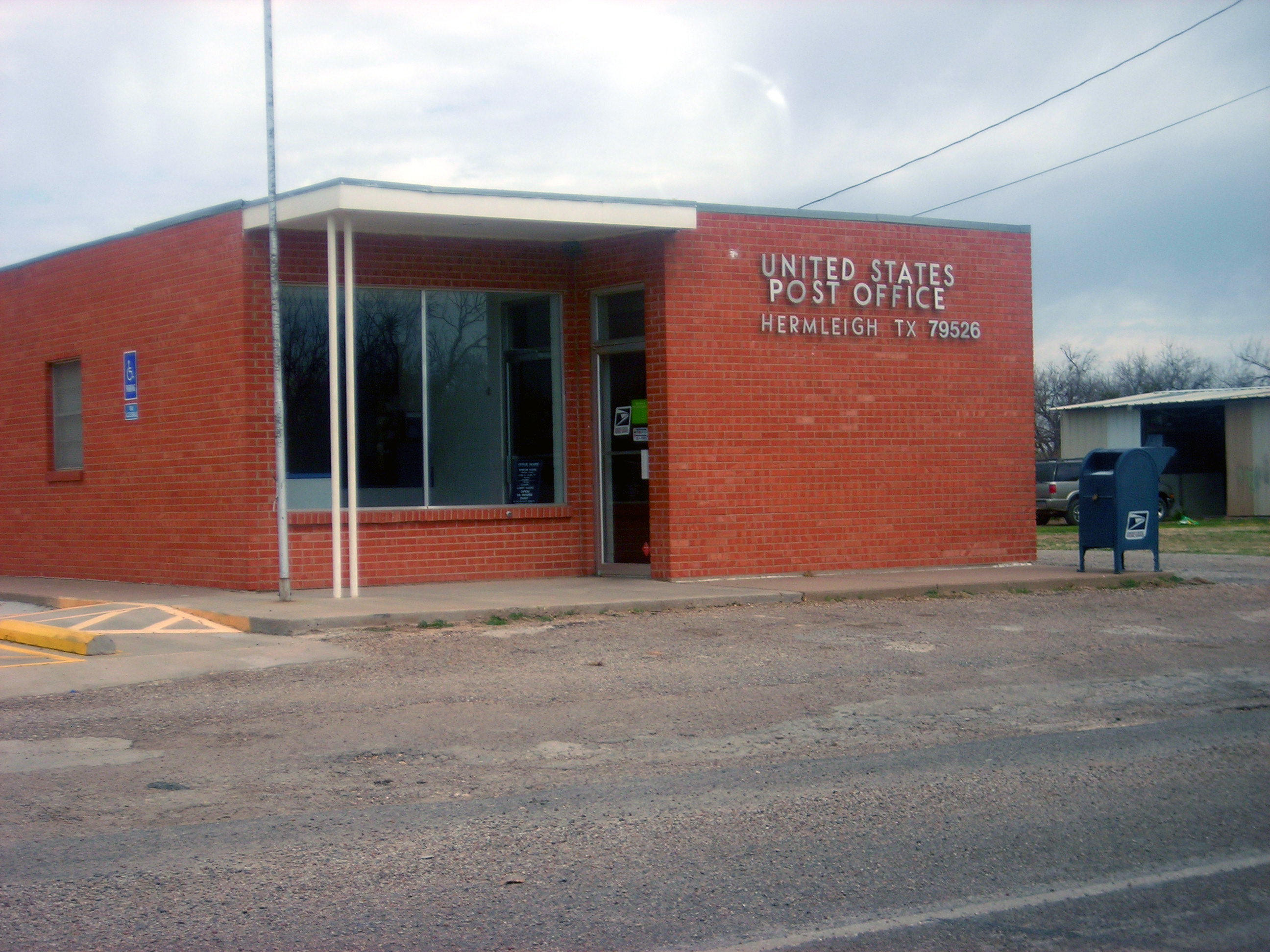
- The Hermleigh post office.

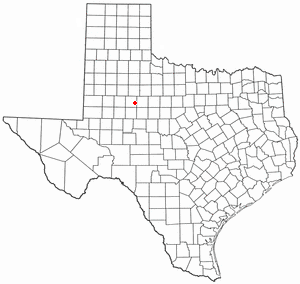
- Location of Hermleigh, Texas

- Coordinates: 32°38′5″N 100°45′34″W
- Country: United States
- State: Texas
- County: Scurry

Area
  - Total: 9.1 sq mi (23.5 km^{2})
  - Land: 9.1 sq mi (23.5 km^{2})
  - Water: 0 sq mi (0.0 km^{2})
- Elevation: 2,441 ft (744 m)

Population (2020)
  - Total: 383
  - Density: 42.2/sq mi (16.3/km^{2})
- Time zone: UTC-6 (Central (CST))
  - Summer (DST): UTC-5 (CDT)
- ZIP code: 79526
- Area code: 325
- FIPS code: 48-33356
- GNIS feature ID: 1337647

Hermleigh is a census-designated place (CDP) in Scurry County, Texas, United States.

Hermleigh lies on U.S. Route 84, ninety-six miles southeast of Lubbock, and has a population of 383 people at the 2020 census.

A destructive low-end EF2 tornado struck the northwestern side of town on May 1, 2022, damaging or destroying mobile homes while also damaging a home, a garage, trailers, and vehicles. A 4.9 magnitude earthquake was reported by the United States Geological Survey on July 22, 2024.

== Geography ==
Hermleigh is located at 32°38′5″N 100°45′34″W (32.634619, -100.759336).

According to the United States Census Bureau, the CDP has a total area of 9.1 square miles (23.5 km^{2}), all land.

== Demographics ==
Historical population
Census	Pop.	Note	%±
2000	393		—
2010	345		−12.2%
2020	383		11.0%
U.S. Decennial Census; 1850–1900 1910; 1920 1930 1940; 1950 1960 1970; 1980 1990 2000; 2010

Hermleigh first appeared as a census designated place in the 2000 U.S. census.

=== 2020 census ===
Hermleigh CDP, Texas – Racial and ethnic composition Note: the US Census treats Hispanic/Latino as an ethnic category. This table excludes Latinos from the racial categories and assigns them to a separate category. Hispanics/Latinos may be of any race.
Race / Ethnicity (NH = Non-Hispanic)	Pop 2000	Pop 2010	Pop 2020	% 2000	% 2010	% 2020
White alone (NH)	290	227	213	73.79%	65.80%	55.61%
Black or African American alone (NH)	8	5	1	2.04%	1.45%	0.26%
Native American or Alaska Native alone (NH)	0	3	1	0.00%	0.87%	0.26%
Asian alone (NH)	0	1	0	0.00%	0.29%	0.00%
Native Hawaiian or Pacific Islander alone (NH)	0	0	0	0.00%	0.00%	0.00%
Other race alone (NH)	0	0	0	0.00%	0.00%	0.00%
Mixed race or Multiracial (NH)	2	2	13	0.51%	0.58%	3.39%
Hispanic or Latino (any race)	93	107	155	23.66%	31.01%	40.47%
Total	393	345	383	100.00%	100.00%	100.00%

=== 2000 census ===
As of the census of 2000, there were 393 people, 151 households, and 104 families residing in the CDP. The population density was 43.4 inhabitants per square mile (16.8/km^{2}). There were 183 housing units at an average density of 20.2/sq mi (7.8/km^{2}). The racial makeup of the CDP was 90.08% White, 2.29% African American, 0.25% Asian, 5.34% from other races, and 2.04% from two or more races. Hispanic or Latino of any race were 23.66% of the population.

There were 151 households, out of which 33.1% had children under the age of 18 living with them, 58.3% were married couples living together, 8.6% had a female householder with no husband present, and 31.1% were non-families. 28.5% of all households were made up of individuals, and 15.2% had someone living alone who was 65 years of age or older. The average household size was 2.60 and the average family size was 3.24.

In the CDP, the population was spread out, with 28.2% under the age of 18, 12.2% from 18 to 24, 23.4% from 25 to 44, 20.9% from 45 to 64, and 15.3% who were 65 years of age or older. The median age was 36 years. For every 100 females, there were 99.5 males. For every 100 females age 18 and over, there were 95.8 males.

The median income for a household in the CDP was $26,111, and the median income for a family was $30,417. Males had a median income of $27,222 versus $21,000 for females. The per capita income for the CDP was $11,843. About 13.1% of families and 23.4% of the population were below the poverty line, including 34.7% of those under age 18 and 25.3% of those age 65 or over.

== History ==
Hermleigh's history begins in 1907 when a townsite was surveyed on land donated by two men named R. C. Herm and Harry W. Harlin near the small community of Wheat. Citizens chose to name their new community "Hermlin" (an amalgam of the surnames of the two landowners) but this name was rejected by postal officials as being too close to the nearby town of Hamlin, potentially causing confusion between the two communities. The compromise of "Hermleigh" was settled upon, and the post office opened shortly thereafter. The Roscoe, Snyder and Pacific Railway was built through the new community, and residents of Wheat began to relocate to Hermleigh.

In 1911 the Santa Fe Railroad reached the community, and Hermleigh developed into a shipping point and trading center for local ranchers and cotton farmers. A school opened to serve area students in 1913, and by the late 1910s the community had its own newspaper (the Hermleigh Herald). Hermleigh briefly changed its name in the late 1910s to Foch to honor the French field marshal and World War I hero Ferdinand Foch, but reverted to the original name shortly thereafter and continued to flourish until the early 1930s, when the effects of the Great Depression brought an end to Hermleigh's growth.

Though adversely effected by the Depression, Hermleigh remained stable throughout most of the twentieth century and by 1980 was home to over 700 residents. By 1990, however, the population had fallen dramatically to approximately 200 and some of the remaining businesses closed down. The community inexplicably rebounded during the 1990s, with the population reaching 393 by the 2000 Census.

Hermleigh is the hometown of former head coach of the Baylor Bears football program, Grant Teaff.

The most expensive pig ever sold was owned by a Hermleigh resident. Jefferey Roemisch of Hermleigh sold his cross-breed barrow named "Bud" for a record-breaking $56,000 in 1983 to a man named Bud Olson and his partner, Phil Bonzio.

== Education ==
The community of Hermleigh is served by the Hermleigh Independent School District.
