= Mal Hammack =

American football player (1933–2004)

No. 31, 33
- Positions: Halfback, fullback, linebacker

Personal information
- Born: June 19, 1933; Roscoe, Texas, U.S.
- Died: July 19, 2004 (aged 71); Valley Park, Missouri, U.S.
- Listed height: 6 ft 2 in (1.88 m)
- Listed weight: 205 lb (93 kg)

Career information
- High school: Roscoe
- College: Arlington State (1951–1952); Florida (1953–1954)
- NFL draft: 1955: 3rd round, 26th overall pick

Career history
- Chicago / St. Louis Cardinals (1955–1966)

Awards and highlights
- Second-team All-SEC (1954); University of Florida Athletic Hall of Fame

Career NFL statistics
- Rushing yards: 1,278
- Rushing average: 4
- Receptions: 27
- Receiving yards: 255
- Total touchdowns: 8
- Stats at Pro Football Reference

Malcolm Eugene Hammack (June 19, 1933 – July 19, 2004) was an American college and professional football player who was a running back in the National Football League (NFL) for twelve years during the 1950s and 1960s. Hammack played college football for the University of Florida, and thereafter, he played professionally for the Chicago/St. Louis Cardinals of the NFL.

== Early life ==
Hammack was born in Roscoe, Texas in 1933. He attended Roscoe High School, where he played for the Roscoe Plowboys high school football team. After graduating from high school, he attended Arlington State Junior College in Arlington, Texas, and played football for the Arlington State Rebels.

== Major college career ==
Hammack accepted an athletic scholarship to transfer to the University of Florida in Gainesville, Florida, where he played for coach Bob Woodruff's Florida Gators football team in 1953 and 1954. As a senior in 1954, he was a second-team All-Southeastern Conference (SEC) selection and the first recipient of the Gators' Fergie Ferguson Award, recognizing the "senior football player who displays outstanding leadership, character and courage." Woodruff later ranked him as one of the Gators' five best offensive backs of the 1950s.

Hammack returned to Florida to finish his bachelor's degree in 1958, and was later inducted into the University of Florida Athletic Hall of Fame as a "Gator Great."

== Professional career ==
The Chicago Cardinals selected Hammack in the third round (26th pick overall) in the 1955 NFL draft, and he played his entire twelve-year professional career for the Cardinals, in both Chicago (1955–1959) and St. Louis (1960–1966). Hammack was used primarily as a blocking fullback, but he still had 320 carries for 1,278 yards and seven touchdowns in his career.

== See also ==
- Florida Gators football, 1950–59
- History of the Arizona Cardinals
- List of Florida Gators in the NFL draft
- List of University of Florida alumni
- List of University of Florida Athletic Hall of Fame members
