= Ira High School =

Location
- 6123 West FM 1606; Ira, Texas 79527; United States; 32.581690°N 101.005443°W

Information
- School type: Public high school
- School district: Ira Independent School District
- Principal: Dale Jones
- Teaching staff: 20.64 (FTE)
- Grades: K-12
- Enrollment: 249 (2023-2024)
- Student to teacher ratio: 12.06
- Colors: Orange & Black
- Athletics conference: UIL Class AAA
- Mascot: Bulldog
- Website: Ira High School

Ira High School or Ira School is a public high school located in unincorporated Ira, Texas (USA) and classified as a 1A school by the UIL. It is part of the Ira Independent School District located in southwestern Scurry County. In 2015, the school was rated "Met Standard" by the Texas Education Agency.

== Athletics ==
The Ira Bulldogs compete in these sports -

- Baseball
- Basketball
- Cross Country
- 6-Man Football
- Softball
- Tennis
- Track and Field

=== State Titles ===
- Baseball
  - 2024(1A)
