= Highland School District =

Highland School District may refer to:

- Highland School District (Arkansas) - Highland, Arkansas
- Highland School District (Washington)
- Highland School District (Wisconsin) - Highland, Wisconsin
- Highland Community School District - Washington County, Iowa
- Highland Community Unit School District 5 - Highland, Illinois
- Highland Independent School District - Nolan County, Texas
- Highland Local School District - Medina County, Ohio
