= Bitter Creek, Texas =

Bitter Creek is a ghost town in Nolan County, Texas, United States. Its location is not known, as the community no longer exists.

== History ==
Bitter Creek was settled in the early 1880s by the Bardwell and Montgomery families. Bitter Creek is thought to have been located south of present-day Sweetwater, in northeastern Nolan County. In 1923, oil was discovered in Bitter Creek. By the 1950s, its population declined to only five residents.
