= Ira Independent School District =

School district in Texas

Coordinates: 32.5859°N 101.0020°W

Ira Independent School District is a public school district based in the community of Ira, Texas (USA). Located in southwestern Scurry County, the district extends into a small portion of northwestern Mitchell County.

== Academic achievement ==
In 2009, the school district was rated "academically acceptable" by the Texas Education Agency.

== Schools ==
Ira ISD has one school Ira High School that serves students in grades kindergarten through twelve.

== Special programs ==
=== Athletics ===
Ira High School plays six-man football.

== See also ==
- List of school districts in Texas
