= Hermleigh Independent School District =

School district in Texas

Coordinates: 32.63882°N 100.73258°W

Hermleigh Independent School District is a public school district based in the community of Hermleigh, Texas (USA). It was founded in 1907. Located in southeastern Scurry County, a small portion of the district extends into southwestern Fisher County.

== Academic achievement ==
In 2009, the school district was rated "academically acceptable" by the Texas Education Agency.

== Student demographics ==
Hermleigh ISD student demographic figures as of the 2005–2006 school year:

White	98	59.8%
Hispanic	64	39.0%
African American	2	1.2%
Total	164	100.0%

== Schools ==
Hermleigh ISD has one school that is composed of two campuses - secondary (junior high/high; grades 6-12) and elementary (grades K-5).

== Special programs ==
=== Athletics ===
Hermleigh High School plays six-man football.

== See also ==
- List of school districts in Texas
