= Ira, Texas =

Ira
- Unincorporated community
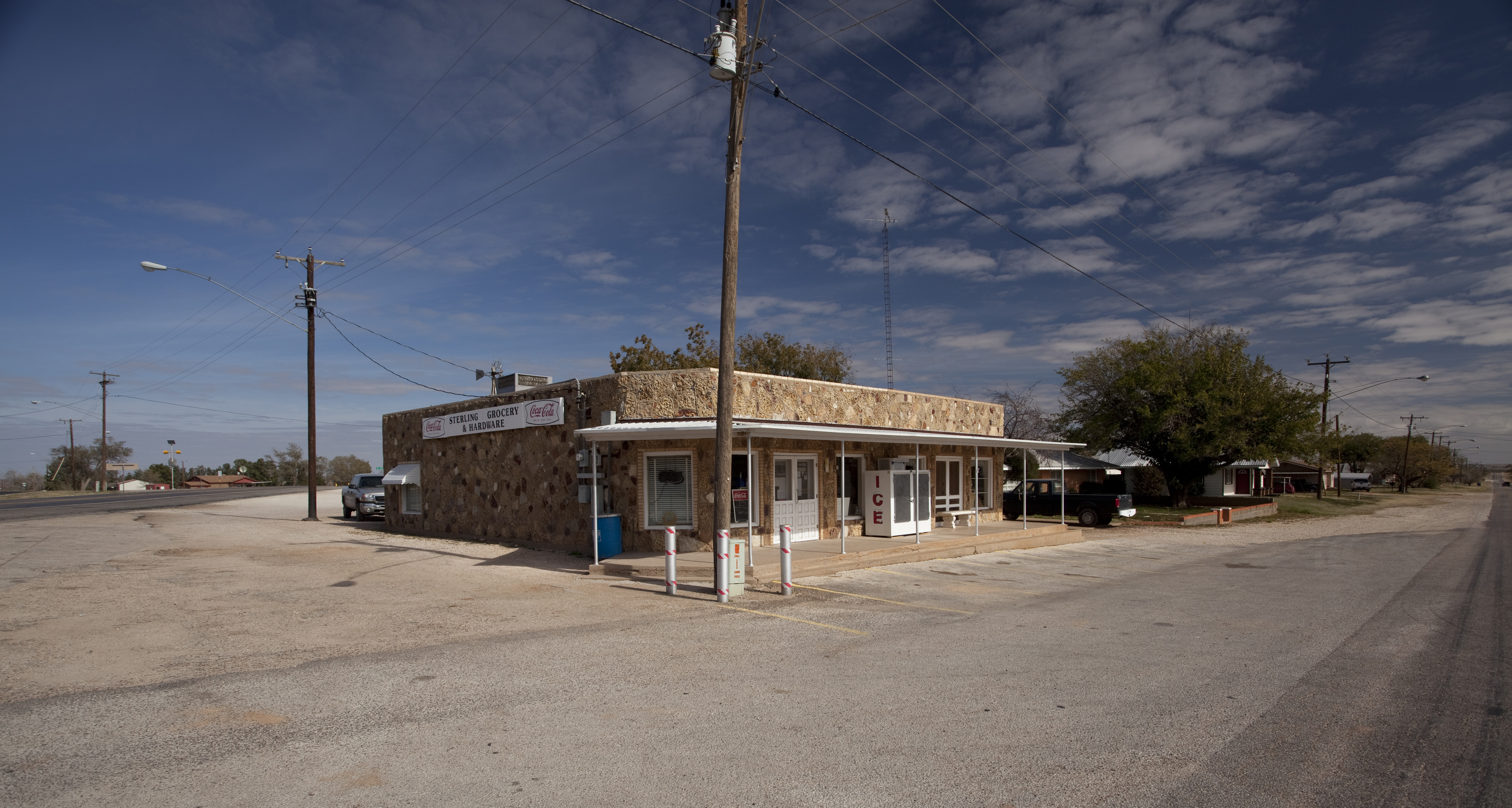
- Sterling Grocery and Hardware in Ira

- Location within Texas
- Coordinates: 32°34′55″N 101°00′07″W
- Country: United States
- State: Texas
- County: Scurry
- Elevation: 2,270 ft (690 m)
- Time zone: UTC-6 (Central (CST))
  - Summer (DST): UTC-5 (CDT)
- ZIP code: 79527
- GNIS feature ID: 1338489
- Website: Handbook of Texas

Ira is an unincorporated community in Scurry County, Texas, United States. It lies in the southwestern corner of the county at the junction of State Highway 350 and Farm to Market Road 1606, 10 miles southwest of Snyder, and has an estimated population of 250.

== History ==
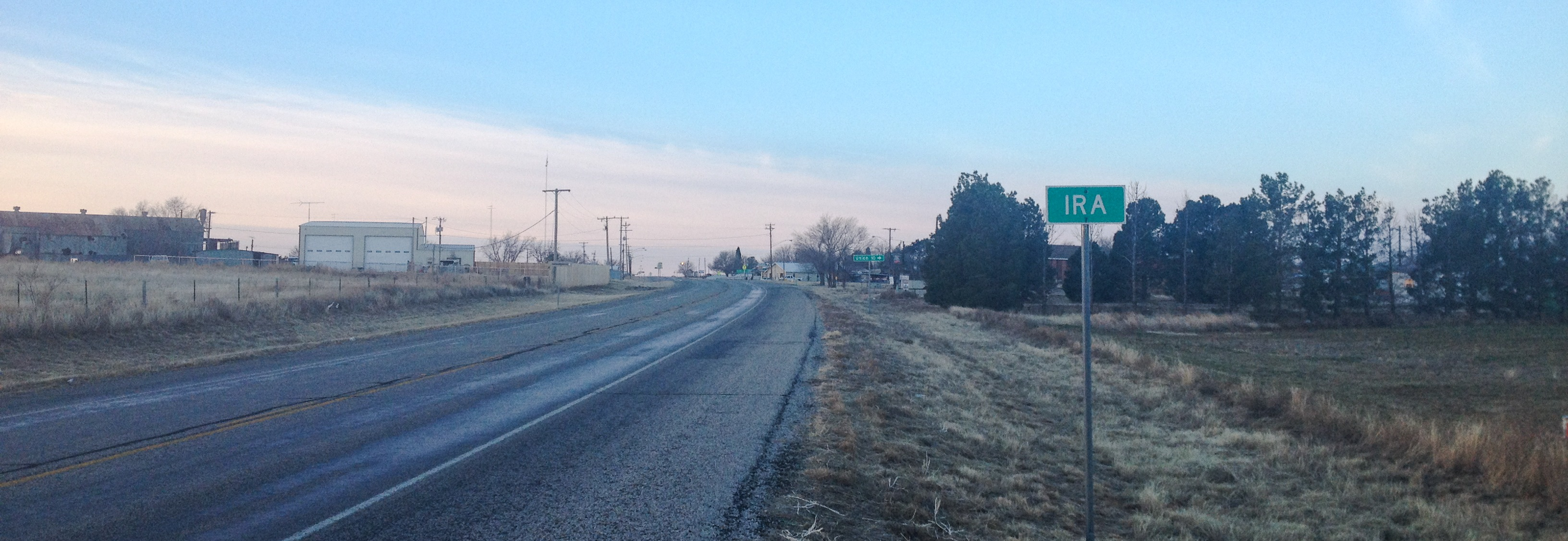
Ira on Texas State Highway 350

Ira's history began sometime in the early 1890s, when Ira Green established a general store in the area. Green's store became a meeting point for the stagecoach and mail route, and a community began to spring up. A school opened in 1893, and Ira Green became postmaster when the community's post office was activated three years later.

After reaching its peak in the early 20th century, Ira survived a period of economic downturn in Scurry County, and in 1980 was reportedly home to 485 residents. This had fallen by almost half by 1990, and in 2000, Ira reported about 250 residents.

== Education ==
The community of Ira is served by the Ira Independent School District and home to the Ira High School Bulldogs.

== See also ==
- Llano Estacado
- Colorado River (Texas)
- Mushaway Peak
- Duffy's Peak
- Farm to Market Road 669
