= Roscoe Collegiate High School =

Location
- 700 Elm Street; Roscoe, Texas 79545-0010; United States; 32.438087°N 100.542043°W

Information
- School type: Public high school
- School district: Roscoe Collegiate Independent School District
- Principal: Greg Althof
- Grades: 6–12
- Enrollment: 256 (2016–17)
- Colors: Purple and white
- Athletics conference: UIL Class 2
- Nickname: Plowboys
- Website: Roscoe Collegiate High School website

Roscoe Collegiate High School or RCHS is a 2A public high school located in Roscoe, Texas, United States. It is part of the Roscoe Collegiate Independent School District located in north west Nolan County. In 2009, Roscoe Collegiate High School received the Texas Education Agency's Early College High School designation, making it the only rural school in Texas to be designated as such. In 2011, the school was rated "Recognized" by the Texas Education Agency.

== Athletics ==
The Roscoe Collegiate Plowboys compete in the following sports:

- Basketball
- Cross Country
- Football
- Powerlifting
- Track and Field

=== State titles ===
- Basketball -
  - 2009(1A/D1)
- Boys Track -
  - 1995(1A)
- Football -
  - None
