= Dunn, Texas =

Dunn
- Unincorporated community
- Location within the state of Texas Dunn (the United States)
- Coordinates: 32°34′1″N 100°53′7″W
- Country: United States
- State: Texas
- County: Scurry

Government
- Elevation: 2,218 ft (676 m)
- Time zone: UTC-6 (Central (CST))
  - Summer (DST): UTC-5 (CDT)
- ZIP codes: 79526
- GNIS feature ID: 1334795

Dunn is an unincorporated community in southern Scurry County, Texas, United States. It is located along State Highway 208 south of Snyder. Dunn previously had a post office.

== History ==
A historical marker in Dunn reads:

Dunn: Started as change station for teams hauling goods north after T. & P. Railway reached Colorado City in 1881. Freighters camped here beside creek. A blacksmith shop and store were started to supply them. In time a town developed. Mail was dropped at home of Mr. and Mrs. A. T. Dunn. Post office, granted 1890, was given their name; Mr. Dunn was first postmaster. In 1890, the first school was built. A well, windmill and trough were added for travelers and town. Because it was in middle of the road, well was covered when highway was paved in 1938. (1966).

== Climate ==
Climate type occurs primarily on the periphery of the true deserts in low-latitude semiarid steppe regions. The Köppen Climate Classification subtype for this climate is BSk (Tropical and Subtropical Steppe Climate).

Climate data for Dunn, Texas
Month	Jan	Feb	Mar	Apr	May	Jun	Jul	Aug	Sep	Oct	Nov	Dec	Year
Mean daily maximum °C (°F)	13 (55)	16 (60)	20 (68)	25 (77)	29 (85)	33 (92)	35 (95)	34 (94)	31 (87)	26 (78)	18 (65)	14 (57)	24 (76)
Mean daily minimum °C (°F)	−3 (27)	−1 (31)	3 (38)	8 (47)	14 (57)	19 (66)	21 (69)	20 (68)	16 (61)	10 (50)	3 (37)	−2 (29)	9 (48)
Average precipitation mm (inches)	18 (0.7)	23 (0.9)	25 (1)	46 (1.8)	79 (3.1)	69 (2.7)	51 (2)	58 (2.3)	66 (2.6)	58 (2.3)	25 (1)	20 (0.8)	540 (21.2)
Source: Weatherbase
