= Fluvanna, Texas =

Fluvanna
- Unincorporated community Census designated place
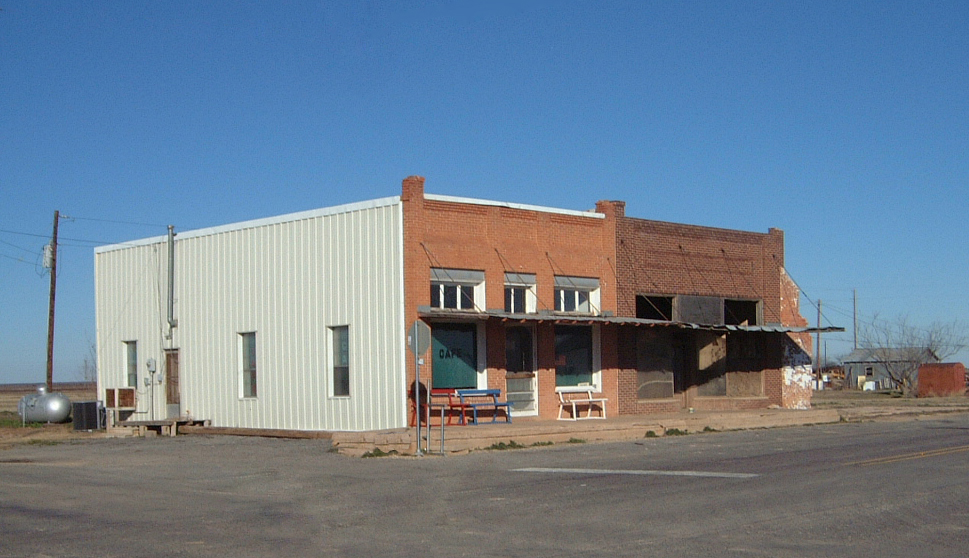
- Downtown Fluvanna

- Location within Texas Location within the United States
- Coordinates: 32°53′08″N 101°08′55″W
- Country: United States
- State: Texas
- County: Scurry
- Region: West Texas
- Established: 1908
- Elevation: 2,674 ft (815 m)

Population (2000)
  - Total: 180
- Time zone: UTC-6 (CST)
- Website: Handbook of Texas

Fluvanna is an unincorporated community and census designated place (CDP) in Scurry County, Texas, United States. It lies just south of the Llano Estacado, high atop the caprock, where Farm to Market Road 1269 and Farm to Market Road 612 intersect.

Fluvanna is named for a surveyor's home county — Fluvanna County, Virginia. Fluvanna was established by realty promoters who knew where the Roscoe, Snyder and Pacific Railway would terminate to satisfy its charter's 50-miles-of-line requirement.

Fluvanna's importance lessened when the railroad closed the station in 1941 and major highways bypassed the area. As of the 2020 census, Fluvanna had a population of 78. The post office has closed in Fluvanna, yet the area still retains the 79517 zip code. Several wind power generation companies (e.g., GE) have office and shop locations in town. There is one convenience store, but no gas station in Fluvanna.

== Demographics ==
Historical population
Census	Pop.	Note	%±
2020	78		—
U.S. Decennial Census; 1850–1900 1910; 1920 1930 1940; 1950 1960 1970; 1980 1990 2000; 2010 2020

Fluvanna first appeared as a census designated place in the 2020 U.S. census.

=== 2020 census ===
Fluvanna CDP, Texas – Racial and ethnic composition Note: the US Census treats Hispanic/Latino as an ethnic category. This table excludes Latinos from the racial categories and assigns them to a separate category. Hispanics/Latinos may be of any race.
Race / Ethnicity (NH = Non-Hispanic)	Pop 2020	% 2020
White alone (NH)	43	55.13%
Black or African American alone (NH)	0	0.00%
Native American or Alaska Native alone (NH)	1	1.28%
Asian alone (NH)	0	0.00%
Native Hawaiian or Pacific Islander alone (NH)	0	0.00%
Other race alone (NH)	0	0.00%
Mixed race or Multiracial (NH)	4	5.13%
Hispanic or Latino (any race)	30	38.46%
Total	78	100.00%

== Gallery ==
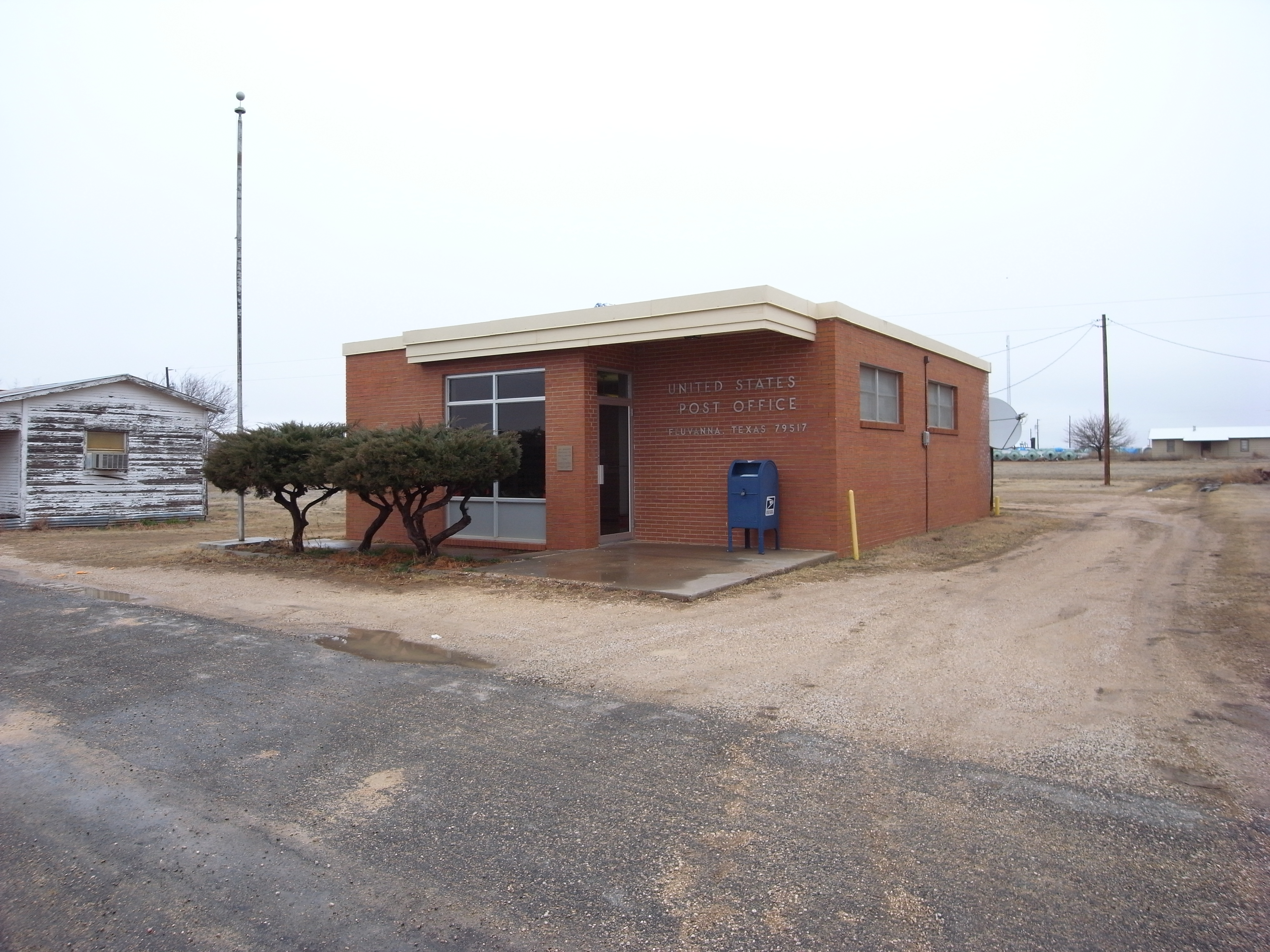
Fluvanna Post Office

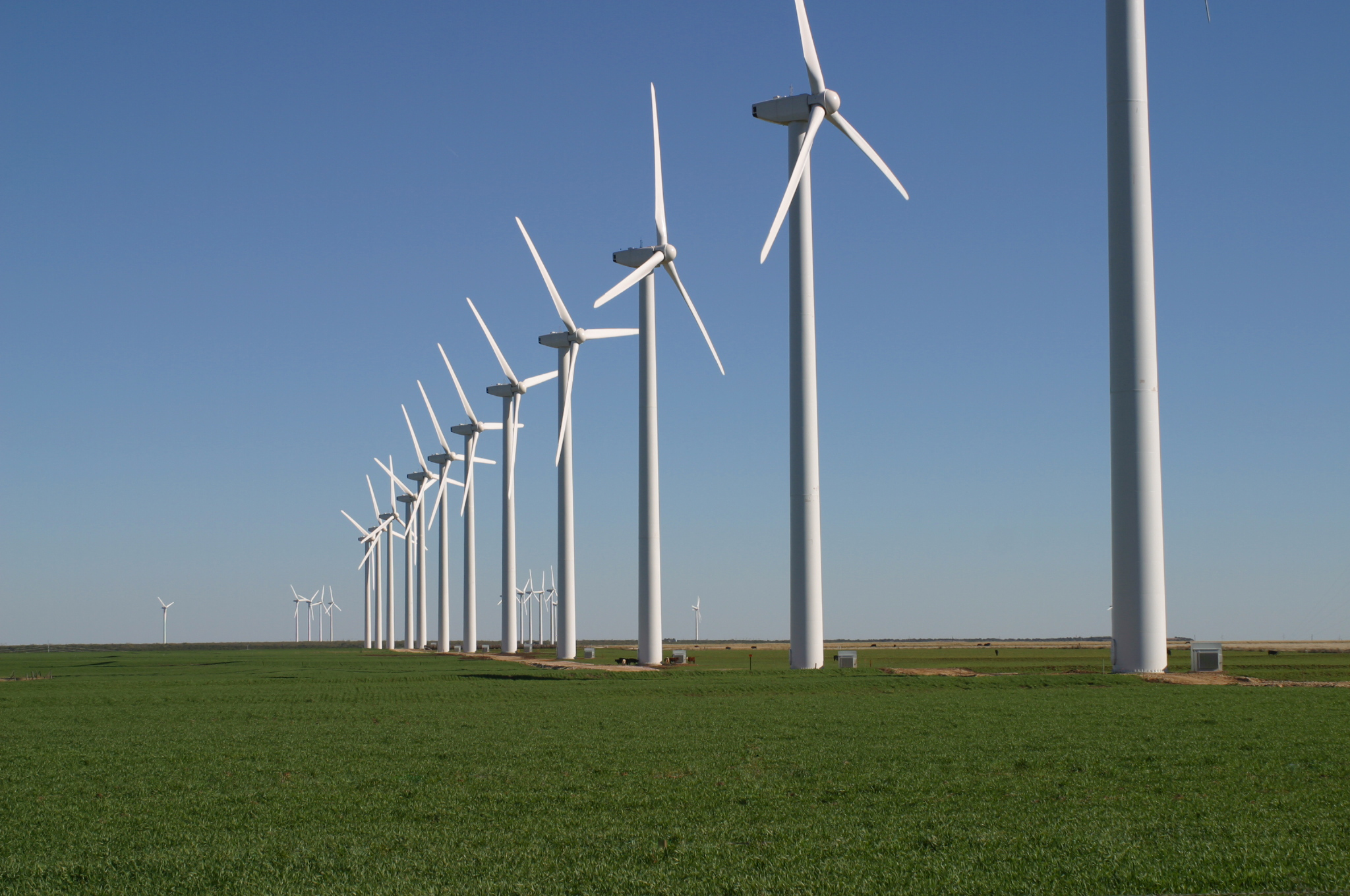
Brazos Wind Farm, Fluvanna, Texas

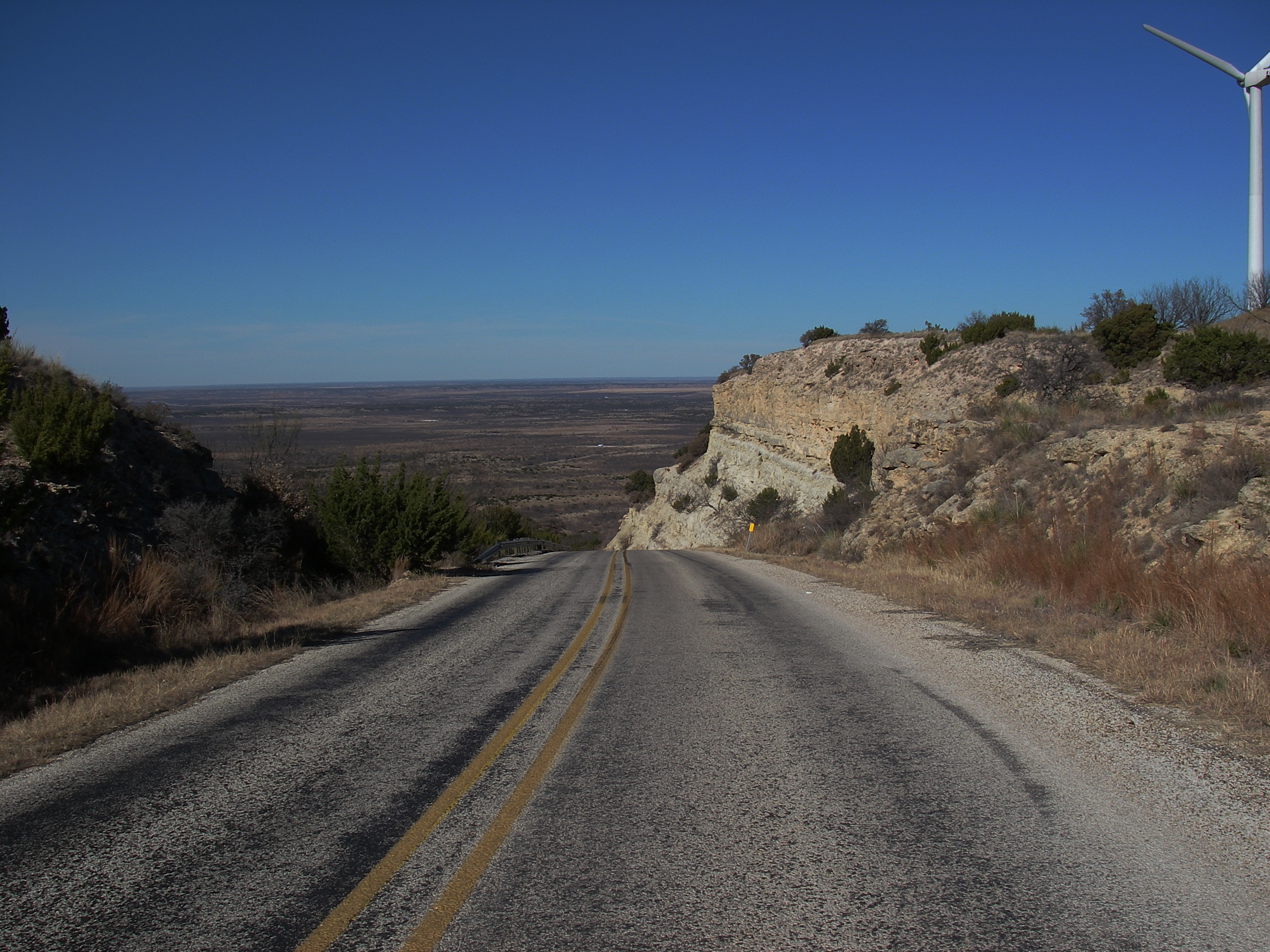
Farm-to-market road 1269

== See also ==
- Caprock Escarpment
- Double Mountain Fork Brazos River
- Duffy's Peak
- Farm to Market Road 669
- Mushaway Peak
- Salt Fork Brazos River
