= List of Baylor Bears head football coaches =

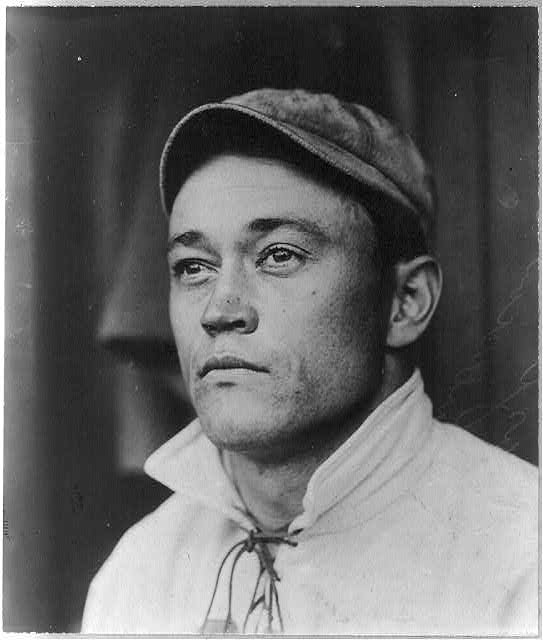
Ralph Glaze, the ninth coach of the Bears

The Baylor Bears football program is a college football team that represents Baylor University in the Big 12 Conference in the National Collegiate Athletic Association. The team has had 25 head coaches since it started playing organized football in 1899. Baylor was a charter member of the Southwest Conference (SWC), joining in 1915. They later became a charter member of the Big 12 in 1996 when the SWC disbanded. After playing without a nickname for 15 years, the school chose Bears as the team nickname in 1914. There were three seasons where Baylor did not field a team. In 1906, the university banned football due to the violent nature of the sport. However, student protests persuaded school officials to reinstate it the next year. In 1943 and 1944, the school canceled the football program due to World War II. The Bears have played in 1,099 games during their 108 seasons. In those seasons, ten coaches have led Baylor to postseason bowl games: Bob Woodruff, George Sauer, Sam Boyd, John D. Bridgers, Grant Teaff, Chuck Reedy, Art Briles, Jim Grobe, Matt Rhule, and Dave Aranda. Six coaches have won conference championships with the Bears: Charles P. Mosley, Frank Bridges, Teaff, Reedy, Briles, and Aranda.

Teaff is the all-time leader in years coached (21), games coached (239), and wins (128). R. H. Hamilton has the highest winning percentage of any Baylor coach, with a 5–1–1 record (.786) during his two-year tenure. Bill Beall is, in terms of winning percentage, the worst coach the Bears have had, winning only 3 of his 31 games (.097). Of the 25 Baylor coaches, 2 have been inducted into the College Football Hall of Fame: Teaff and Morley Jennings. Teaff is also the only coach to have received any coach of the year accolades, winning two national coach of the year award in 1974 and the conference coach of the year award twice. The current coach is Dave Aranda who was hired in 2020

== Key ==
General
| # | A running total of the number of coaches |
| CCs | Conference championships (Note: Baylor did not join a conference until 1915.) |
| † | Elected to the College Football Hall of Fame |
| ‡ | Interim coach |

Overall games
| GC | Games coached |
| OW | Wins |
| OL | Losses |
| OT | Ties (Note: Overtime rules in college football were introduced in 1996, making ties impossible in the period since.) |
| O% | Winning percentage (Note: When computing the win–loss percentage, a tie counts as half a win and half a loss.) |

Conference games
| CW | Wins |
| CL | Losses |
| CT | Ties |
| C% | Winning percentage |

Postseason games
| PW | Wins |
| PL | Losses |

== Coaches ==
Statistics correct as of the end of the 2025 NCAA Division I FBS football season.

| # | Name | Term | GC | OW | OL | OT | O% | CW | CL | CT | C% | PW | PL | CCs | Awards |
|---|---|---|---|---|---|---|---|---|---|---|---|---|---|---|---|
| 1 | R. H. Hamilton | 1899–1900 | 7 | 5 | 1 | 1 | .786 | — | — | — | — | — | — | — | — |
| 2 | W. J. Ritchie | 1901 | 8 | 5 | 3 | 0 | .625 | — | — | — | — | — | — | — | — |
| 3 | J. C. Ewing | 1902 | 9 | 3 | 4 | 2 | .444 | — | — | — | — | — | — | — | — |
| 4 | R. N. Watts | 1903 | 8 | 4 | 3 | 1 | .563 | — | — | — | — | — | — | — | — |
| 5 | Sol Metzger | 1904 | 8 | 2 | 5 | 1 | .313 | — | — | — | — | — | — | — | — |
| 6 | Archie R. Webb | 1905 | 7 | 1 | 6 | 0 | .143 | — | — | — | — | — | — | — | — |
| 7 | Luther Burleson | 1907 | 8 | 4 | 3 | 1 | .563 | — | — | — | — | — | — | — | — |
| 8 | E. J. Mills | 1908–1909 | 16 | 8 | 8 | 0 | .500 | — | — | — | — | — | — | — | — |
| 9 | Ralph Glaze | 1910–1912 | 25 | 12 | 10 | 3 | .540 | — | — | — | — | — | — | — | — |
| 10 | Norman Paine | 1913 | 10 | 3 | 4 | 3 | .450 | — | — | — | — | — | — | — | — |
| 11 | Charles P. Mosley | 1914–1919 | 52 | 30 | 18 | 4 | .615 | 8 | 7 | 1 | .531 | — | — | 1 | — |
| 12 | Frank Bridges | 1920–1925 | 59 | 35 | 18 | 6 | .644 | 13 | 8 | 6 | .593 | — | — | 2 | — |
| 13 | Morley Jennings^{†} | 1926–1940 | 149 | 83 | 60 | 6 | .577 | 40 | 50 | 7 | .448 | — | — | — | — |
| 14 | Frank Kimbrough | 1941–1942, 1945–1946 (Note: Baylor did not field a team in 1943 and 1944 due to World War II.) | 41 | 15 | 23 | 3 | .402 | 6 | 16 | 2 | .292 | — | — | — | — |
| 15 | Bob Woodruff | 1947–1949 | 31 | 19 | 10 | 2 | .645 | 8 | 9 | 1 | .472 | 1 | 0 | — | — |
| 16 | George Sauer^{†} | 1950–1955 | 62 | 38 | 21 | 3 | .637 | 19 | 14 | 3 | .569 | 0 | 2 | — | — |
| 17 | Sam Boyd | 1956–1958 | 31 | 15 | 15 | 1 | .500 | 5 | 12 | 1 | .306 | 1 | 0 | — | — |
| 18 | John D. Bridgers | 1959–1968 | 103 | 49 | 53 | 1 | .481 | 31 | 37 | 1 | .457 | 2 | 1 | — | — |
| 19 | Bill Beall | 1969–1971 | 31 | 3 | 28 | 0 | .097 | 1 | 20 | 0 | .048 | — | — | — | — |
| 20 | Grant Teaff^{†} | 1972–1992 | 239 | 128 | 105 | 6 | .548 | 83 | 74 | 4 | .528 | 4 | 4 | 2 | AFCA Coach of the Year (1974); Eddie Robinson Coach of the Year (1974); SWC Coach of the Year (1974, 1980) |
| 21 | Chuck Reedy | 1993–1996 | 55 | 23 | 22 | 0 | .511 | 13 | 16 | 0 | .448 | 0 | 1 | 1 | — |
| 22 | Dave Roberts | 1997–1998 | 22 | 4 | 18 | — | .182 | 2 | 17 | — | .125 | — | — | — | — |
| 23 | Kevin Steele | 1999–2002 | 45 | 8 | 36 | — | .200 | 1 | 31 | — | .031 | — | — | — | — |
| 24 | Guy Morriss | 2003–2007 | 58 | 18 | 40 | — | .310 | 7 | 33 | — | .175 | — | — | — | — |
| 25 | Art Briles | 2008–2015 | 102 | 65 | 37 | — | .637 | 39 | 30 | — | .565 | 3 | 3 | 2 (Note: In 2014, Baylor was co-Big 12 champions with TCU.) | Big 12 Coach of the Year (2013); AP College Football Coach of the Year (2013) |
| 26 | Jim Grobe ^{‡} | 2016 | 13 | 7 | 6 | — | .538 | 3 | 6 | — | .333 | 1 | 0 | — | — |
| 27 | Matt Rhule | 2017–2019 | 37 | 19 | 18 | — | .514 | 13 | 14 | — | .481 | 1 | 1 | 0 | Big 12 Coach of the Year (2019) |
| 28 | Dave Aranda | 2020– | 77 | 40 | 37 | — | .493 | 28 | 30 | — | .444 | 1 | 2 | 1 | AP Big 12 Coach of the Year (2021) |
