= Highland Independent School District =

School district in Nolan County, Texas

Location
- Nolan County, Texas United States
- Coordinates: 32.3366°N 100.5197°W

District information
- Type: Public school district
- Grades: Pre-kindergarten through twelve
- Schools: 1

Other information
- Website: www.highland.esc14.net

Highland Independent School District is a public school district in southwestern Nolan County, Texas (USA).

== Academic achievement ==
In 2009, the school district was rated "exemplary" by the Texas Education Agency. Received the 2015 National Blue Ribbon School Award, an award issued by the U.S. Secretary of Education for overall academic excellence or progress in closing achievement gaps. Highland ISD was one of only 25 schools recognized in Texas.

== Schools ==
The district has one campus that serves students in grades pre-kindergarten through twelve.

== Special programs ==
=== Athletics ===
Highland High School plays six-man football.

== See also ==
- List of school districts in Texas
