= Roscoe Collegiate Independent School District =

School district in Texas

Roscoe Collegiate Independent School District is a public school district based in Roscoe, Texas, United States. The name was formerly Roscoe Independent School District, but it officially changed to its current name on October 22, 2012.

Located in Nolan County, small portions of the district extend into Fisher, Mitchell, and Scurry counties.

Roscoe Collegiate ISD has three campuses -

- Roscoe Collegiate High School (grades 6-12)
- Roscoe Elementary School

(grades 1-5)

- Roscoe Early Childhood Center (grades PK 3, PK 4, and Kindergarten)

Paying tribute to the agricultural area which the district serves, the mascot is the Roscoe Plowboy.

== Leadership in early college programs ==
In 2009 Roscoe Collegiate High School received the Texas Education Agency's Early College High School designation, making it the only rural school in Texas to be designated as such. Beginning with an associates degree program assisted with revenue from wind energy, RCISD developed a P-20 program (preschool to PhD) capability in cooperation with colleges and universities in the area, notably Western Texas College in Snyder and Texas State Technical College between Roscoe and Sweetwater, and additional partnerships with Texas A&M AgriLife Extension, 4H, and the Texas Tech T-STEM Center.

In 2009, the school district was rated "recognized" by the Texas Education Agency.
