= Roscoe, Texas =

- City
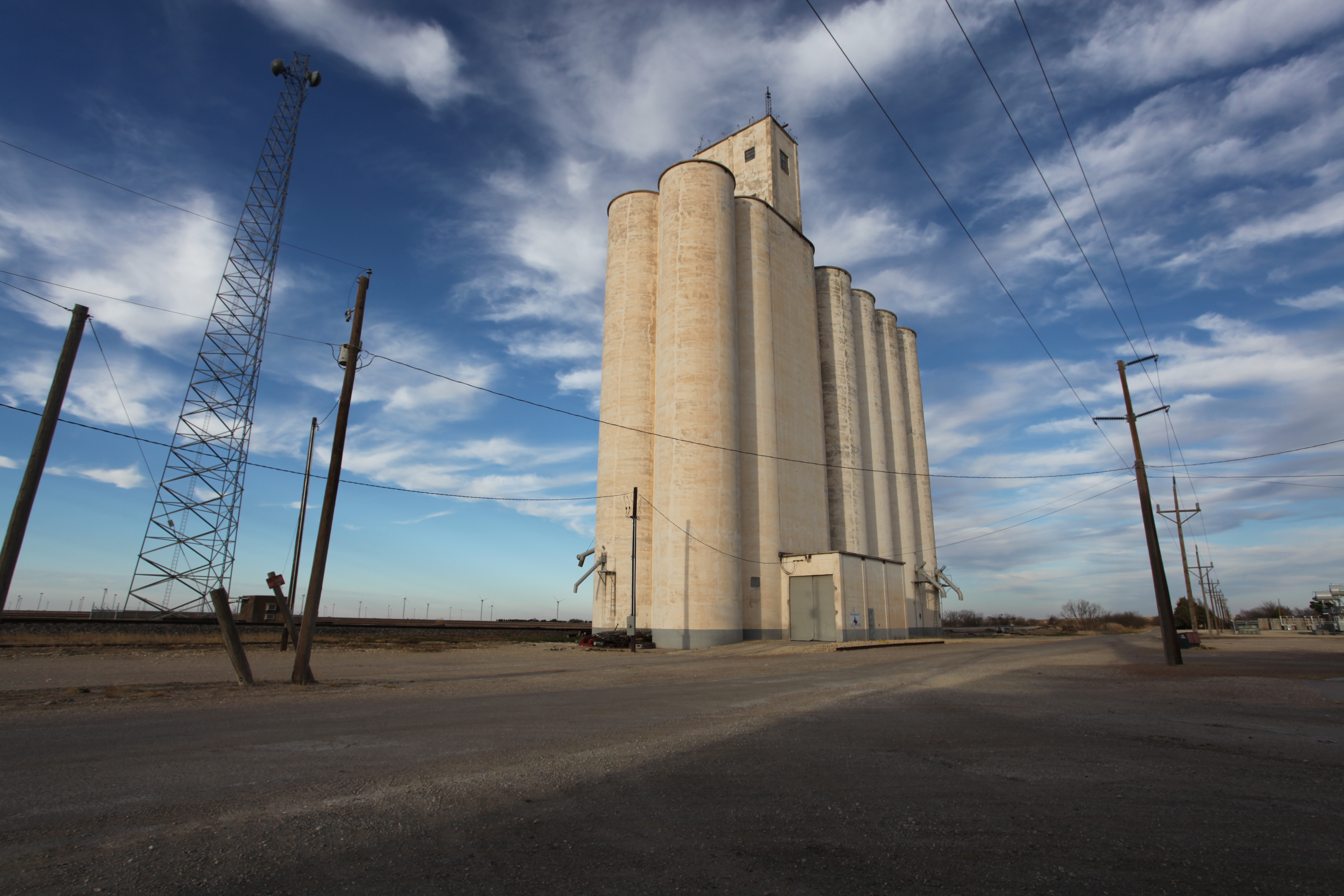
- Plowboy grain elevator in Roscoe

- Location within Texas
- Coordinates: 32°26′45″N 100°31′19″W
- Country: United States
- State: Texas
- County: Nolan
- Region: West Texas
- Established: 1890

Area
  - Total: 3.22 sq mi (8.35 km^{2})
  - Land: 3.22 sq mi (8.35 km^{2})
  - Water: 0 sq mi (0.00 km^{2})
- Elevation: 2,388 ft (728 m)

Population (2020)
  - Total: 1,271
  - Density: 394/sq mi (152/km^{2})
- Time zone: UTC-6 (CST)
- ZIP code: 79545
- Area code: 325
- FIPS code: 48-63176
- GNIS feature ID: 2410993

Roscoe is a city in Nolan County in the U.S. state of Texas near the intersection of Interstate 20 and US Highway 84. The Union Pacific Railroad passes through the center of the city. The population was 1,271 at the 2020 census.

== Geography ==
According to the United States Census Bureau, the city has a total area of 1.9 square miles (4.9 km^{2}), all land. The population was 1,378 at the 2000 census, but has since decreased to only approximately 900.^{Need Citation, Disagrees with Side Bar - History}

=== Climate ===
According to the Köppen climate classification system, Roscoe has a semiarid climate, BSk on climate maps. The hottest temperature recorded in was 113 °F (45.0 °C) on June 27, 1994, while the coldest temperature recorded was −11 °F (−23.9 °C) on January 5, 1947.

Climate data for Roscoe, Texas, 1991–2020 normals, extremes 1937–present
Month	Jan	Feb	Mar	Apr	May	Jun	Jul	Aug	Sep	Oct	Nov	Dec	Year
Record high °F (°C)	88 (31)	91 (33)	98 (37)	104 (40)	110 (43)	113 (45)	110 (43)	111 (44)	107 (42)	102 (39)	90 (32)	88 (31)	113 (45)
Mean maximum °F (°C)	76.4 (24.7)	81.4 (27.4)	87.5 (30.8)	93.5 (34.2)	99.5 (37.5)	101.3 (38.5)	102.7 (39.3)	101.5 (38.6)	96.9 (36.1)	90.9 (32.7)	81.6 (27.6)	75.8 (24.3)	104.6 (40.3)
Mean daily maximum °F (°C)	55.5 (13.1)	60.3 (15.7)	68.7 (20.4)	77.8 (25.4)	84.8 (29.3)	91.1 (32.8)	94.6 (34.8)	93.5 (34.2)	85.7 (29.8)	76.5 (24.7)	64.8 (18.2)	56.8 (13.8)	75.8 (24.3)
Daily mean °F (°C)	43.2 (6.2)	47.3 (8.5)	55.1 (12.8)	63.8 (17.7)	72.3 (22.4)	79.5 (26.4)	83.0 (28.3)	82.0 (27.8)	74.5 (23.6)	64.5 (18.1)	52.9 (11.6)	44.9 (7.2)	63.6 (17.5)
Mean daily minimum °F (°C)	30.8 (−0.7)	34.3 (1.3)	41.6 (5.3)	49.8 (9.9)	59.9 (15.5)	68.0 (20.0)	71.3 (21.8)	70.5 (21.4)	63.3 (17.4)	52.6 (11.4)	41.0 (5.0)	33.0 (0.6)	51.3 (10.7)
Mean minimum °F (°C)	15.2 (−9.3)	18.1 (−7.7)	23.2 (−4.9)	33.1 (0.6)	45.1 (7.3)	58.0 (14.4)	63.8 (17.7)	61.7 (16.5)	49.1 (9.5)	34.4 (1.3)	23.1 (−4.9)	17.4 (−8.1)	11.0 (−11.7)
Record low °F (°C)	−11 (−24)	−9 (−23)	5 (−15)	22 (−6)	31 (−1)	43 (6)	54 (12)	49 (9)	35 (2)	16 (−9)	11 (−12)	−6 (−21)	−11 (−24)
Average precipitation inches (mm)	0.98 (25)	0.99 (25)	1.39 (35)	1.49 (38)	2.79 (71)	3.12 (79)	1.77 (45)	2.20 (56)	2.13 (54)	2.22 (56)	1.15 (29)	0.98 (25)	21.21 (538)
Average snowfall inches (cm)	0.3 (0.76)	0.5 (1.3)	0.0 (0.0)	0.0 (0.0)	0.0 (0.0)	0.0 (0.0)	0.0 (0.0)	0.0 (0.0)	0.0 (0.0)	0.0 (0.0)	0.8 (2.0)	0.7 (1.8)	2.3 (5.86)
Average precipitation days (≥ 0.01 in)	2.8	2.7	3.6	2.9	4.9	4.7	3.4	3.8	4.3	4.2	2.6	2.6	42.5
Average snowy days (≥ 0.1 in)	0.1	0.1	0.0	0.0	0.0	0.0	0.0	0.0	0.0	0.0	0.1	0.1	0.4
Source 1: NOAA
Source 2: National Weather Service

== History ==
Originally named Vista for an official of the Texas and Pacific Railway which passed through the town, Roscoe took its present name with the opening of the post office in 1890. The town was incorporated in 1907. Shipment of cattle by railroad featured prominently in the town's early economic history, and the Roscoe, Snyder, and Pacific Railway connected the town to the Santa Fe Railway in nearby Fluvanna in 1909.

A post office has been in operation at Roscoe since 1890.

== Demographics ==
Historical population
Census	Pop.	Note	%±
1910	941		—
1920	1,079		14.7%
1930	1,250		15.8%
1940	1,166		−6.7%
1950	1,584		35.8%
1960	1,490		−5.9%
1970	1,580		6.0%
1980	1,628		3.0%
1990	1,446		−11.2%
2000	1,378		−4.7%
2010	1,322		−4.1%
2020	1,271		−3.9%
U.S. Decennial Census

=== 2020 census ===
As of the 2020 census, Roscoe had a population of 1,271. The median age was 35.8 years, 29.9% of residents were under the age of 18, and 18.8% of residents were 65 years of age or older. For every 100 females there were 94.0 males, and for every 100 females age 18 and over there were 94.1 males age 18 and over.

0.0% of residents lived in urban areas, while 100.0% lived in rural areas.

There were 468 households in Roscoe, of which 40.0% had children under the age of 18 living in them. Of all households, 48.5% were married-couple households, 18.4% were households with a male householder and no spouse or partner present, and 26.1% were households with a female householder and no spouse or partner present. About 26.5% of all households were made up of individuals and 15.0% had someone living alone who was 65 years of age or older.

There were 550 housing units, of which 14.9% were vacant. The homeowner vacancy rate was 1.8% and the rental vacancy rate was 16.2%.

Racial composition as of the 2020 census
Race	Number	Percent
White	818	64.4%
Black or African American	20	1.6%
American Indian and Alaska Native	14	1.1%
Asian	4	0.3%
Native Hawaiian and Other Pacific Islander	0	0.0%
Some other race	198	15.6%
Two or more races	217	17.1%
Hispanic or Latino (of any race)	609	47.9%

=== 2000 census ===
As of the census of 2000, 1,380 people, 509 households, and 382 families resided in the city. The population density was 728.1 inhabitants per square mile (281.1/km^{2}). The 588 housing units averaged 310.7/sq mi (120.1/km^{2}). The racial makeup of the city were 75.18% White, 1.09% African American, 0.44% Native American, 0.15% Asian, 20.17% from other races, and 2.98% from two or more races. Hispanics or Latinos of any race were 36.94% of the population.

Of 509 households, 32.6% had children under the age of 18 living with them, 61.5% were married couples living together, 10.2% had a female householder with no husband present, and 24.8% were not families. About 22.8% of all households were made up of individuals, and 13.0% had someone living alone who was 65 years of age or older. The average household size was 2.63 and the average family size was 3.09.

In the town, the population was distributed as 28.2% under the age of 18, 6.9% from 18 to 24, 23.3% from 25 to 44, 22.3% from 45 to 64, and 19.3% who were 65 years of age or older. The median age was 38 years. For every 100 females, there were 89.8 males. For every 100 females age 18 and over, there were 90.6 males.

The median income for a household in the city was $23,816, and for a family was $28,393. Males had a median income of $25,313 versus $20,000 for females. The per capita income for the city was $11,792. About 20.6% of families and 25.2% of the population were below the poverty line, including 34.9% of those under age 18 and 17.1% of those age 65 or over.

== Economy ==
The Roscoe Wind Farm, owned and operated by E.ON Climate and Renewables, is one of the world's largest capacity wind farms with 627 wind turbines and a total installed capacity of 781.5 MW. At the time of its completion, it was the largest wind farm in the world, surpassing the nearby 735.5-MW Horse Hollow Wind Energy Center. In 2012, it was overtaken by California's 1,020-MW Alta Wind Energy Center. The project cost more than $1 billion and provides enough power for more than 250,000 average Texan homes. A landowner can earn between $500 and $1,000 per windmill per year.

== Arts and culture ==
The Plowboy Mudbog is a biannual off-road competition held at the George Parks Baseball Complex. Participants navigate a 200-yard mud course in pursuit of cash prizes and trophies. The event typically attracts 60–80 vehicles and over 2,000 spectators. Net proceeds support youth athletics, including the Roscoe Little League.

The summer edition coincides with the Independence Day Celebration on the first weekend of July.

Each October, the Mudbog aligns with the West Texas Wind Festival, a one-day street fair celebrating the nearby Roscoe Wind Farm and the region's renewable energy heritage.

== Education ==
The City of Roscoe is served by Roscoe Collegiate Independent School District. The recent wind development in the area has enabled Roscoe ISD to update its aging facilities built in the era of the Works Progress Administration. Since the 2012–13 school year, all of the district's students have been in new or updated buildings. Roscoe Collegiate ISD operates one of 50 Early College High Schools in Texas in partnership with Western Texas College in Snyder. Students of Roscoe Collegiate High School have the ability to earn an associate degree from Western Texas College at the time of high school graduation. The mascot of Roscoe Collegiate High School is the Plowboys.

== Transportation ==
In addition to the Union Pacific, another rail line, the Roscoe, Snyder and Pacific Railway (RS&P), formerly extended 50 miles (80 km) from Roscoe to Fluvanna, passing through Snyder. Built in 1908, the railway served as a bridge between the Atchison, Topeka and Santa Fe Railway in Snyder and the then-Texas and Pacific Railway in Roscoe. Although the RS&P became one of the most profitable short lines in the nation during its early years, passenger service was discontinued in 1953, freight service was discontinued in the late 1970s, and most of the tracks outside of the city had been removed by 1984.

== Notable people ==
- Mal Hammack, American college and professional football player
- John Layfield, professional wrestler and commentator
- Tim Marcum, American arena football coach
- J. J. Pickle, U.S. congressman
- Veda Victoria Ross, opera singer and vocal coach

== See also ==
- Double Mountain Fork Brazos River
- Hobbs, Texas
- Brazos Wind Farm
- Wind power in Texas
- U.S. Route 84
