= Roscoe, Snyder and Pacific Railway =

Roscoe, Snyder & Pacific Railway
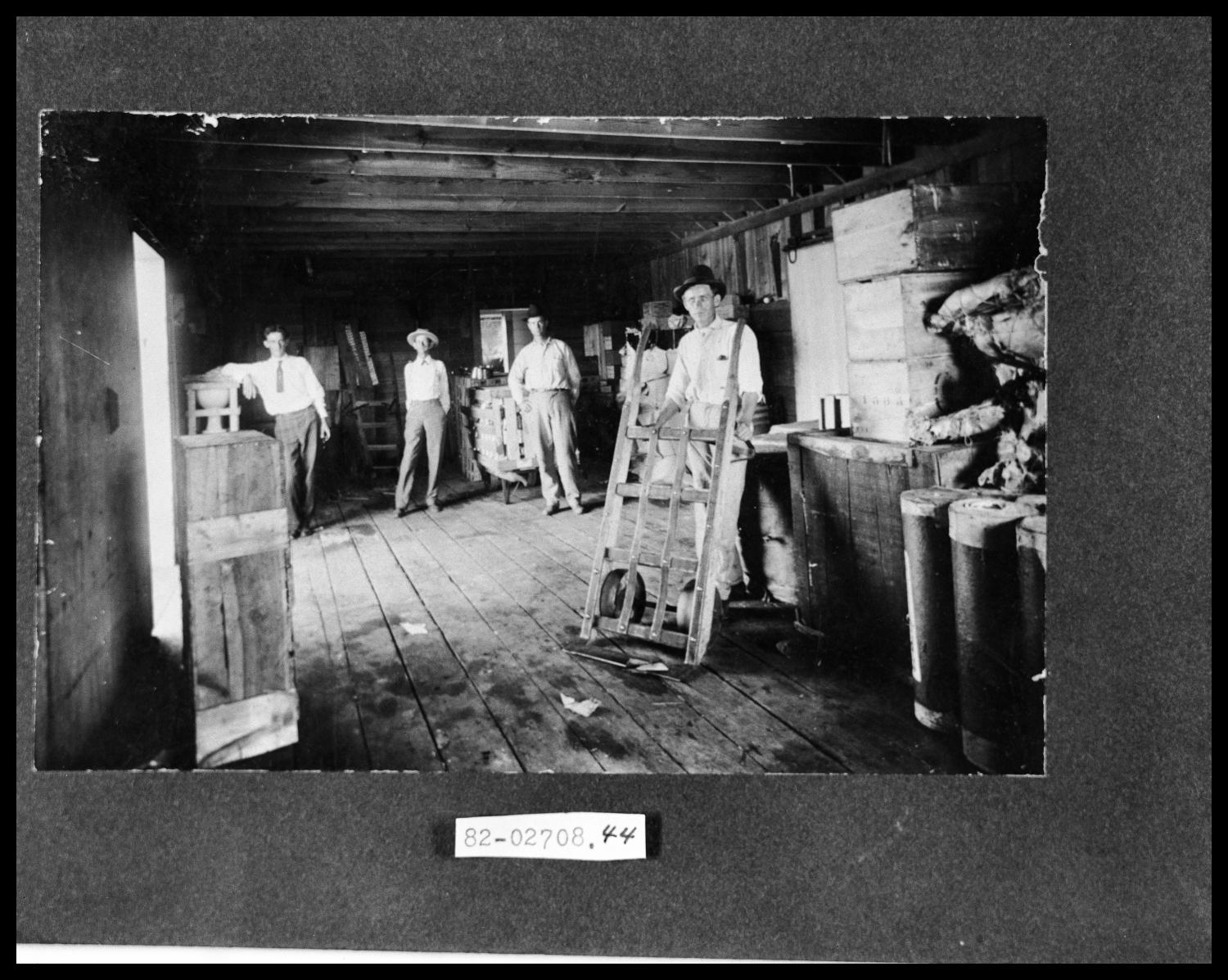
- Roscoe, Snyder & Pacific Freight Depot

Overview
- Headquarters: Roscoe, Texas
- Reporting mark: RSP
- Locale: West Texas
- Dates of operation: 1908–1984
- Successor: BNSF, Union Pacific

Technical
- Track gauge: 4 ft 8 1/2 in (1,435 mm) standard gauge

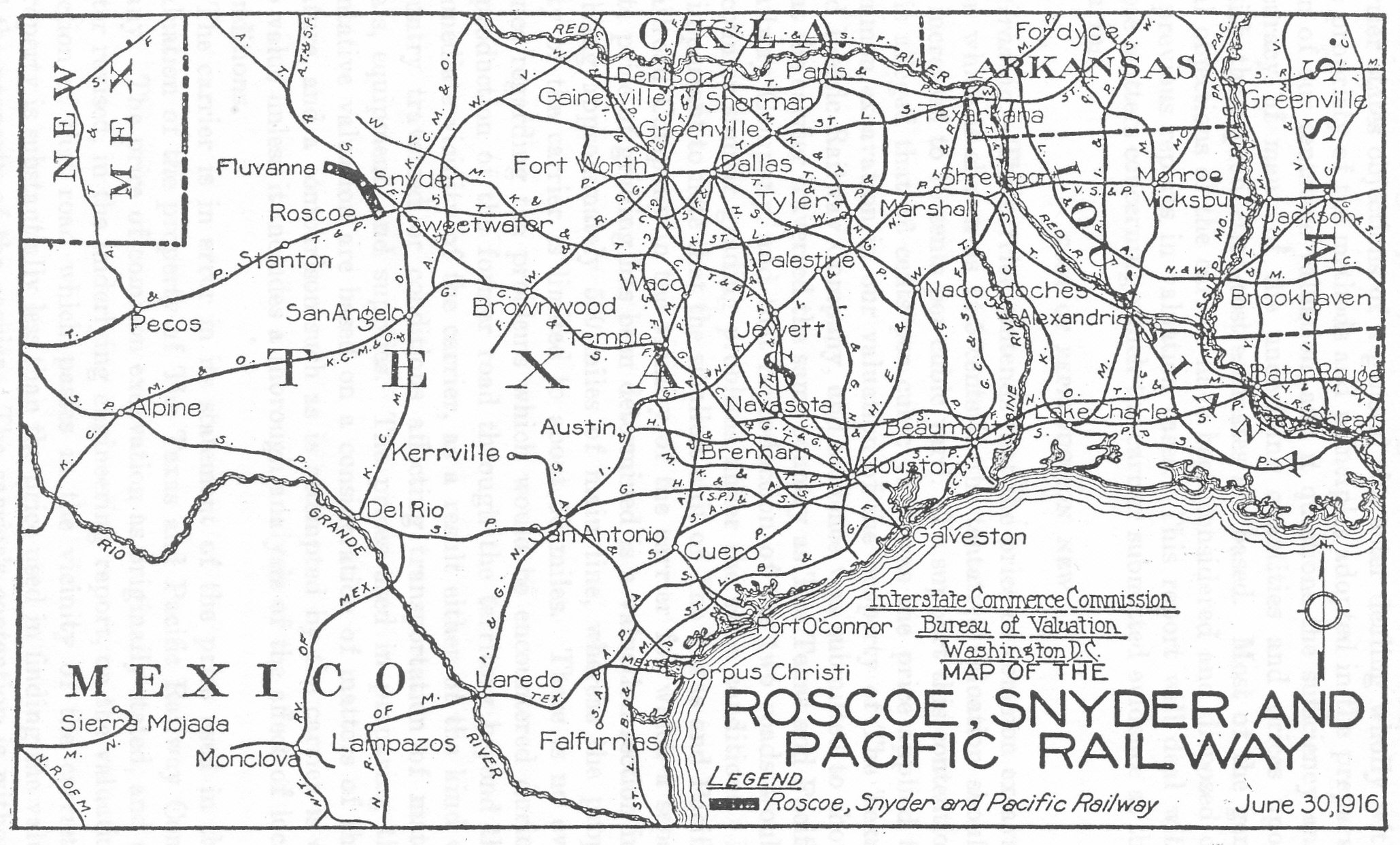
Roscoe, Snyder & Pacific Railway in 1916.

The Roscoe, Snyder and Pacific Railway was an American shortline railroad based in the small West Texas town of Roscoe.

== History ==
The Roscoe, Snyder and Pacific Railway Company was incorporated August 31, 1906, to construct a 230 mi (370 km) railroad from Roscoe, Texas, to the New Mexico state line near Portales. The full line was never completed but a 31 mi (50 km) line was opened to Snyder in 1908 and extended another 18.5 miles (29.8 km) to Fluvanna in September 1909.

The line was abandoned between Snyder and Fluvanna prior to 1945, and passenger service ended in 1953. The line between Roscoe and Snyder was abandoned in 1984 because of deregulation associated with the Staggers Rail Act of 1980, which made it difficult for the company to compete. A small portion of the line that connects to the Union Pacific near Roscoe still serves a railroad car rebuilding facility and provides storage of rail cars awaiting repair.

== See also ==
- Fort Worth and Denver Railway
- West Texas and Lubbock Railway
- Texas – New Mexico Railroad
- Llano Estacado
- Wastella, Texas
