= Nolan County, Texas =

County in Texas, United States

- County
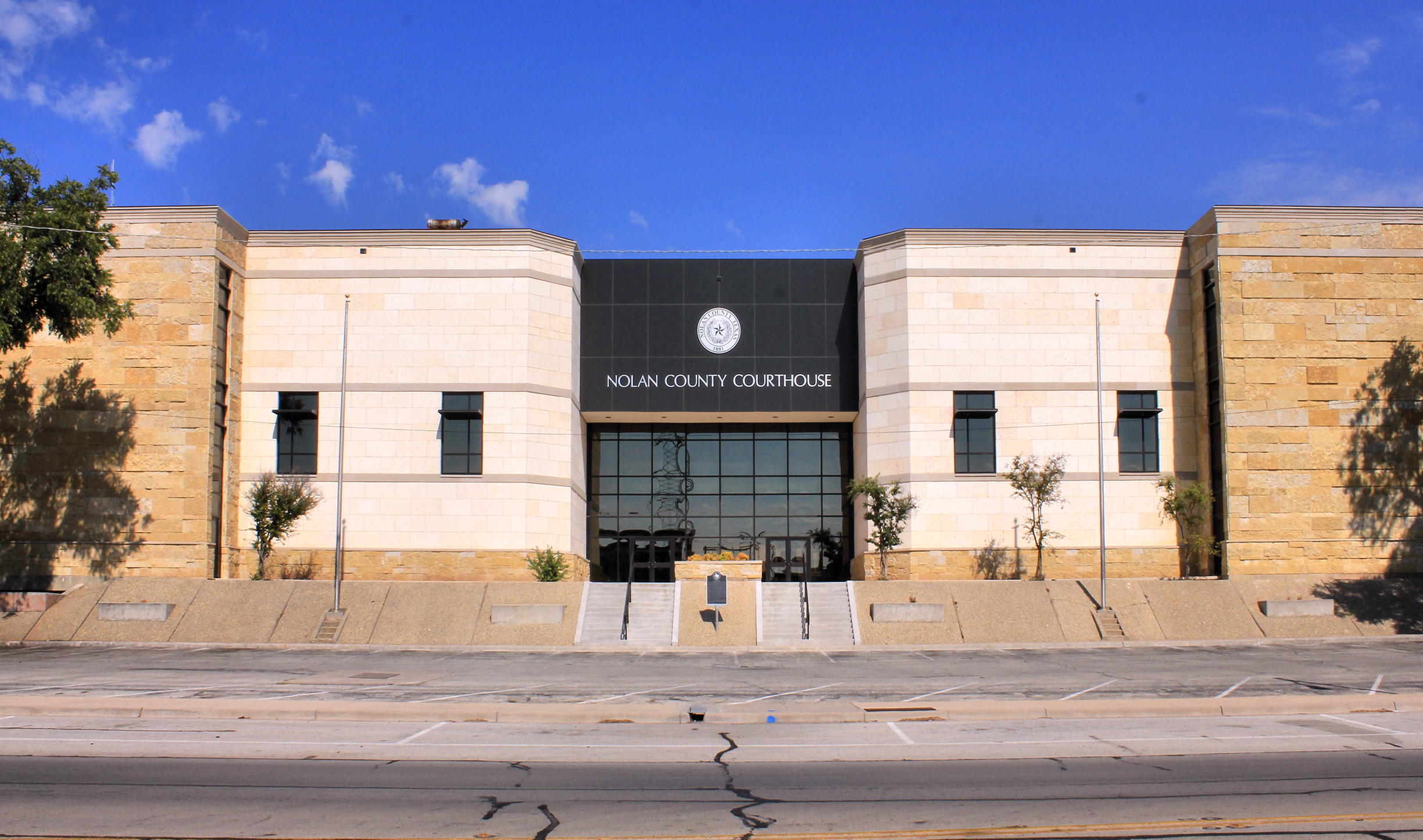
- Nolan County Courthouse

- Location within the U.S. state of Texas
- Coordinates: 32°19′N 100°24′W
- Country: United States
- State: Texas
- Founded: 1881
- Named for: Philip Nolan
- Seat: Sweetwater
- Largest city: Sweetwater

Area
  - Total: 914 sq mi (2,370 km^{2})
  - Land: 912 sq mi (2,360 km^{2})
  - Water: 2.0 sq mi (5.2 km^{2}) 0.2%

Population (2020)
  - Total: 14,738
  - Estimate (2025): 14,117 ▼
  - Density: 16.2/sq mi (6.24/km^{2})
- Time zone: UTC−6 (Central)
  - Summer (DST): UTC−5 (CDT)
- Congressional district: 19th
- Website: www.co.nolan.tx.us

Nolan County is a county located in the west-central region of the U.S. state of Texas. As of the 2020 census, its population was 14,738. Its county seat is Sweetwater. The county was created in 1876 and organized in 1881. It is named for Philip Nolan, one of the first American traders to visit Texas. Nolan County comprises the Sweetwater micropolitan statistical area.

== Geography ==
According to the U.S. Census Bureau, the county has a total area of 914 square miles (2,370 km^{2}), of which 2.0 sq mi (5.2 km^{2}) (0.2%) are covered by water.

Nolan County is in the Cross Timbers region for wildlife management. Geologically Nolan County occupies part of the Rolling Plains in the North and South, separated by an isolated part of the Edwards Plateau in much of the center. The uplifted plateau, rising up to 500 feet above the surrounding plains, gives Nolan county an advantage on production of wind energy.

West of Highland School, the Bench Mountain, at 2607 feet above sea level, is listed as the highest point in Nolan County.

Plateau areas of the Cretaceous Period and much of the county are underlain by petroleum deposits from the Pennsylvanian Period.

=== Major highways ===
- Interstate 20
  - I-20 BL (Roscoe)
  - I-20 BL (Sweetwater)
- U.S. Highway 84
- U.S. Highway 277
- State Highway 70
- State Highway 153
- Loop 170

=== Adjacent counties ===
- Fisher County (north)
- Taylor County (east)
- Runnels County (southeast)
- Coke County (south)
- Mitchell County (west)

== Demographics ==
Historical population
Census	Pop.	Note	%±
1880	640		—
1890	1,573		145.8%
1900	2,611		66.0%
1910	11,999		359.6%
1920	10,868		−9.4%
1930	19,323		77.8%
1940	17,309		−10.4%
1950	19,808		14.4%
1960	18,963		−4.3%
1970	16,220		−14.5%
1980	17,359		7.0%
1990	16,594		−4.4%
2000	15,802		−4.8%
2010	15,216		−3.7%
2020	14,738		−3.1%
2025 (est.)	14,117	▼	−4.2%
U.S. Decennial Census; 1850–2010 2010 2020

=== Racial and ethnic composition ===
Nolan County, Texas – Racial and ethnic composition Note: the US Census treats Hispanic/Latino as an ethnic category. This table excludes Latinos from the racial categories and assigns them to a separate category. Hispanics/Latinos may be of any race.
Race / Ethnicity (NH = Non-Hispanic)	Pop 2000	Pop 2010	Pop 2020	% 2000	% 2010	% 2020
White alone (NH)	10,480	9,191	8,138	66.32%	60.40%	55.22%
Black or African American alone (NH)	713	666	625	4.51%	4.38%	4.24%
Native American or Alaska Native alone (NH)	25	44	53	0.16%	0.29%	0.36%
Asian alone (NH)	33	58	103	0.21%	0.38%	0.70%
Pacific Islander alone (NH)	1	0	2	0.01%	0.00%	0.01%
Other race alone (NH)	2	8	31	0.01%	0.05%	0.21%
Mixed race or Multiracial (NH)	117	146	432	0.74%	0.96%	2.93%
Hispanic or Latino (any race)	4,431	5,103	5,354	28.04%	33.54%	36.33%
Total	15,802	15,216	14,738	100.00%	100.00%	100.00%

=== 2020 census ===
As of the 2020 census, the county had a population of 14,738 and a median age of 40.0 years. 25.2% of residents were under the age of 18 and 19.7% of residents were 65 years of age or older. For every 100 females there were 97.9 males, and for every 100 females age 18 and over there were 95.8 males age 18 and over.

The racial makeup of the county was 69.4% White, 4.8% Black or African American, 0.7% American Indian and Alaska Native, 0.7% Asian, <0.1% Native Hawaiian and Pacific Islander, 10.5% from some other race, and 13.7% from two or more races. Hispanic or Latino residents of any race comprised 36.3% of the population.

70.4% of residents lived in urban areas, while 29.6% lived in rural areas.

There were 5,857 households in the county, of which 31.3% had children under the age of 18 living in them. Of all households, 44.5% were married-couple households, 20.9% were households with a male householder and no spouse or partner present, and 28.3% were households with a female householder and no spouse or partner present. About 30.8% of all households were made up of individuals and 14.6% had someone living alone who was 65 years of age or older.

There were 7,123 housing units, of which 17.8% were vacant. Among occupied housing units, 66.2% were owner-occupied and 33.8% were renter-occupied. The homeowner vacancy rate was 2.8% and the rental vacancy rate was 17.4%.

=== 2000 census ===
As of the 2000 census, 15,802 people, 6,170 households, and 4,288 families resided in the county. The population density was 17 people per square mile (6.6 people/km^{2}). The 7,112 housing units averaged 8 units per square mile (3.1 units/km^{2}). The racial makeup of the county was 78.45% White, 4.68% Black or African American, 0.49% Native American, 0.24% Asian, 0.06% Pacific Islander, 14.02% from other races, and 2.07% from two or more races. About 28.04% of the population was Hispanic or Latino of any race.

Of the 6,170 households, 32.20% had children under 18 living with them, 53.00% were married couples living together, 12.60% had a female householder with no husband present, and 30.50% were not families. Around 27.10% of all households were made up of individuals, and 13.40% had someone living alone who was 65 or older. The average household size was 2.48, and the average family size was 3.01.

In the county, the population was distributed as 27.10% under 18, 8.50% from 18 to 24, 25.40% from 25 to 44, 22.60% from 45 to 64, and 16.40% who were 65 or older. The median age was 37 years. For every 100 females, there were 94.70 males. For every 100 females age 18 and over, there were 91.70 males.

The median income for a household in the county was $26,209, and for a family was $32,004. Males had a median income of $28,674 versus $19,335 for females. The per capita income for the county was $14,077. About 18.30% of families and 21.70% of the population were below the poverty line, including 29.50% of those under age 18 and 18.50% of those age 65 or over.

== Wind power ==
Nolan County has established itself as a center for wind power generation. As of July 2008, Nolan County generated more wind energy than the entire state of California, and would have ranked sixth in the world for wind power generation if it were counted as its own country. In 2013, there were more than 13,000 operational wind turbines.

A branch of Texas State Technical College, near Sweetwater, offers the first community-college program for wind energy in Texas beginning in 2007. Wind energy investments in the county of about $3 billion since 1999 have resulted in about 1,330 direct wind-related jobs created in Nolan County alone (in 2009), with almost $18,000,000 in annual landowner royalties and over $12,000,000 in annual local school taxes (2007), and about $1.7 million more in county property taxes. The majority of investments come from Epplament Energy, E.ON, Invenergy, Lestis Private Capital Group, NextEra, and Lattner Energy.

Nolan County is a hub of the Public Utility Commission's $5 billion CREZ wind-energy transmission line expansion project in Texas.

== Communities ==
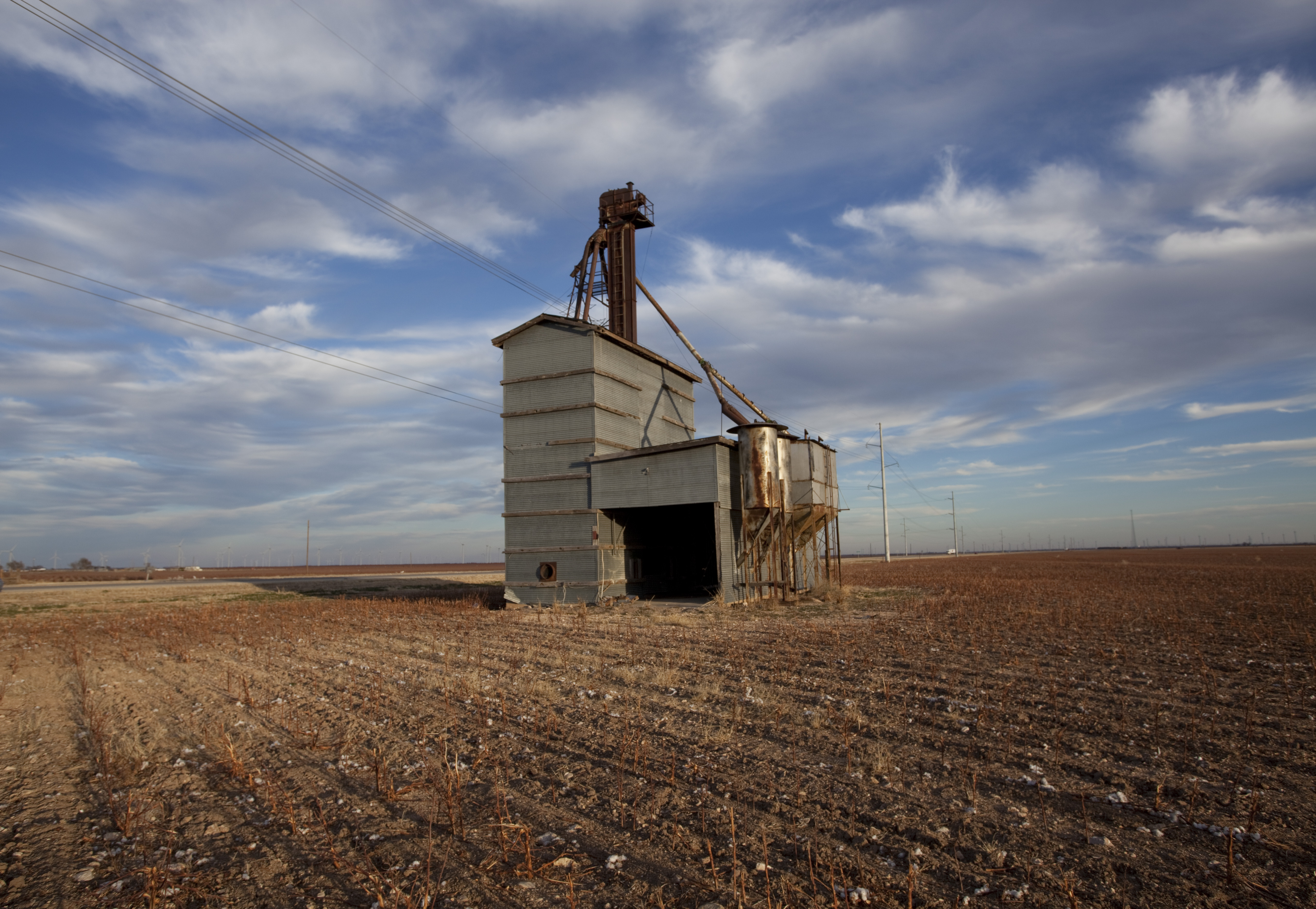
Abandoned grain elevator in Wastella

=== Cities ===
- Blackwell (partly in Coke County)
- Roscoe
- Sweetwater (county seat)

=== Unincorporated communities ===
- Maryneal
- Nolan
- Hylton

=== Ghost towns ===
- Bitter Creek
- Wastella
- Decker (active cemetery remaining)
- Divide (Slater's Chapel cemetery remaining)

== Politics ==
Nolan County is part of the 71st district for elections to the Texas House of Representatives. The Republican state representative Stan Lambert represents the district which also covers Callahan, Jones and Taylor Counties.

United States presidential election results for Nolan County, Texas
Year	Republican		Democratic		Third party(ies)	
Year	No.	%	No.	%	No.	%
1912	60	7.34%	655	80.17%	102	12.48%
1916	91	7.47%	1,048	85.97%	80	6.56%
1920	175	15.16%	923	79.98%	56	4.85%
1924	337	18.32%	1,421	77.23%	82	4.46%
1928	1,475	58.76%	1,035	41.24%	0	0.00%
1932	219	8.19%	2,453	91.70%	3	0.11%
1936	268	8.39%	2,913	91.15%	15	0.47%
1940	471	12.41%	3,314	87.35%	9	0.24%
1944	322	8.59%	3,071	81.96%	354	9.45%
1948	552	13.57%	3,408	83.76%	109	2.68%
1952	2,907	48.11%	3,123	51.68%	13	0.22%
1956	2,232	46.69%	2,535	53.03%	13	0.27%
1960	2,421	42.66%	3,247	57.22%	7	0.12%
1964	1,610	31.19%	3,540	68.58%	12	0.23%
1968	1,969	33.16%	2,784	46.88%	1,185	19.96%
1972	3,634	73.03%	1,338	26.89%	4	0.08%
1976	2,431	43.84%	3,094	55.80%	20	0.36%
1980	2,781	48.83%	2,796	49.10%	118	2.07%
1984	3,608	58.80%	2,524	41.13%	4	0.07%
1988	2,734	48.74%	2,853	50.86%	22	0.39%
1992	1,993	33.48%	2,490	41.83%	1,469	24.68%
1996	2,166	40.18%	2,582	47.89%	643	11.93%
2000	3,337	62.82%	1,874	35.28%	101	1.90%
2004	3,722	70.37%	1,541	29.14%	26	0.49%
2008	3,485	68.83%	1,521	30.04%	57	1.13%
2012	3,282	71.74%	1,216	26.58%	77	1.68%
2016	3,552	73.13%	1,029	21.19%	276	5.68%
2020	4,131	76.97%	1,162	21.65%	74	1.38%
2024	4,048	79.14%	1,020	19.94%	47	0.92%

United States Senate election results for Nolan County, Texas1
Year	Republican		Democratic		Third party(ies)	
Year	No.	%	No.	%	No.	%
2024	3,808	75.56%	1,123	22.28%	109	2.16%

United States Senate election results for Nolan County, Texas2
Year	Republican		Democratic		Third party(ies)	
Year	No.	%	No.	%	No.	%
2020	4,102	77.67%	1,077	20.39%	102	1.93%

Texas Gubernatorial election results for Nolan County
Year	Republican		Democratic		Third party(ies)	
Year	No.	%	No.	%	No.	%
2022	3,093	81.33%	647	17.01%	63	1.66%

== Education ==
School districts include:

- Blackwell Consolidated Independent School District
- Highland Independent School District
- Roscoe Collegiate Independent School District
- Sweetwater Independent School District
- Trent Independent School District

The Texas Legislature designated the county as being in the Western Texas College District.

== See also ==
- List of museums in West Texas
- National Register of Historic Places listings in Nolan County, Texas
- Recorded Texas Historic Landmarks in Nolan County
