= U.S. Route 180 in Texas =

Highway in Texas

U.S. Highway 180
- US 180 highlighted in red

Route information
- Maintained by TxDOT
- Length: 473.2 mi (761.5 km)
- Existed: 1943–present

Trans-Pecos section
- Length: 148.4 mi (238.8 km)
- West end: I-10 / US 85 / US 180 at New Mexico state line near Anthony
- Major intersections: Loop 375 in El Paso
- East end: US 62 / US 180 at New Mexico state line northwest of Pine Springs

Northwest Texas
- Length: 324.8 mi (522.7 km)
- West end: US 62 / US 180 at New Mexico state line west of Seminole
- Major intersections: US 62 / US 385 in Seminole; US 87 in Lamesa; US 84 in Snyder; US 83 / US 277 in Anson; US 283 / SH 6 in Albany; US 183 in Breckenridge; US 281 in Mineral Wells
- East end: I-20 in Hudson Oaks

Location
- Country: United States
- State: Texas
- Counties: El Paso, Hudspeth, Culberson; Gaines, Dawson, Borden, Scurry, Fisher, Jones, Shackelford, Stephens, Palo Pinto, Parker

Highway system
- United States Numbered Highway System; List; Special; Divided; Highways in Texas; Interstate; US; State; Former; Toll; Loops; Spurs; FM/RM; Park; Rec
← SH 179	→ SH 180

U.S. Highway 180 (US 180) is a US highway that runs from Valle, Arizona, to Hudson Oaks, Texas. A child route of U.S. Route 80, the Texas portion of U.S. 180 consists of two distinct segments. Separated by an approximately 105 mile stretch of roadway travelling through southeast New Mexico, the first segment travels through far west Texas from the New Mexico border near El Paso to the New Mexico border approximately 25 miles west of Carlsbad, New Mexico. The second segment begins on the Texas state line between Hobbs, New Mexico, and Seminole and travels east across the lower Panhandle and Cross Timbers regions, passing through the towns of Lamesa, Snyder, Albany, and Breckenridge. The terminus of the second segment, which is also the highway's eastern terminus, is at an interchange with Interstate 20 (I-20) in Hudson Oaks, between Weatherford and Fort Worth.

== Route description ==
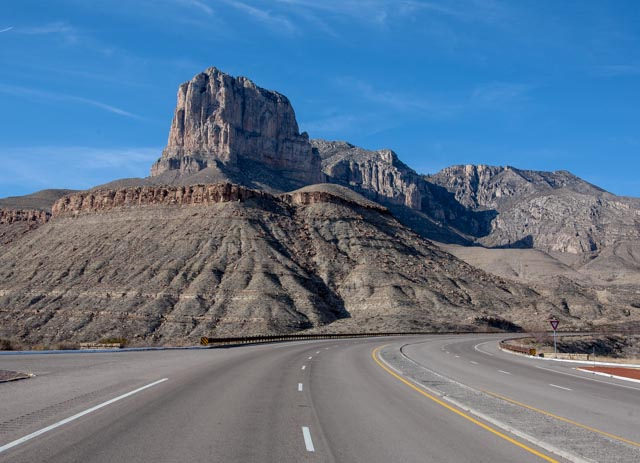
El Capitan as seen from US 180 in Guadalupe Mountains National Park

=== Trans-Pecos ===
The entire section of US 180 through the Trans-Pecos region is concurrent with other highways.

US 180 enters into Texas from New Mexico concurrent with Interstate 10 and US 85 in Anthony. The three highways enter El Paso with US 85 leaving near Sunland Park Mall. I-10/US 180 run along the northern edge of downtown El Paso together, with US 180 leaving and joining U.S. Route 62 at Paisano Drive. The two highways run along east El Paso on Montana Avenue, a major thoroughfare. The highways run along the southern border of El Paso International Airport and Fort Bliss, before intersecting with Loop 375, leaving the city shortly thereafter. After leaving the city, US 62/180 travel through or near several rural suburbs and subdivisions such as Homestead Meadows North, Homestead Meadows South, and Butterfield. The two highways briefly travel through the Guadalupe Mountains National Park near Pine Springs. US 62/180 enters New Mexico approximately 25 miles northwest of Pine Springs.

=== Northwest Texas ===
US 180, still in concurrence with US 62, reenters Texas between Hobbs, New Mexico and Seminole. In Seminole, the highways split, with US 62 joining U.S. Route 385 and travelling north to Seagraves and Brownfield. US 180 continues east, sharing a short overlap with U.S. Route 87 in Lamesa, before continuing east through the towns of Gail and Snyder. US 180 continues to run in a predominantly east–west direction through northwest Texas, passing through towns such as Breckenridge and Mineral Wells. US 180 ends at an interchange with Interstate 20 in Hudson Oaks, about 30 miles west of Fort Worth.

== Future ==
A section of US 62/US 180 in eastern El Paso, known locally as Montana Avenue, is currently being upgraded to a six-lane freeway. The project will be built in two phases; phase one will be from Global Reach Drive/Yarbrough Drive to Tierra Este Road (just east of Loop 375) and was originally scheduled to open in summer 2022. The current eastbound lanes of Montana Avenue will serve as the eastbound frontage road of the future freeway while the old westbound lanes will be converted into the freeway's eastbound lanes. Construction of phase 2, from Tierra Este Road to Zaragoza Road, has not started as funding for that section has not been secured yet.

== Junction list ==
County	Location	mi	km	Exit	Destinations	Notes
El Paso	Anthony	0.00	0.00		I-10 west (US 85 north / US 180 west) – Las Cruces	Continuation into New Mexico
El Paso	see I-10					
El Paso	El Paso	23.8	38.3		I-10 east (Gateway Boulevard) / US 62 west (Paisano Drive) – Van Horn, San Antonio	East end of I-10 overlap; west end of US 62 overlap; I-10 exit 23B
El Paso	El Paso	28.0	45.1		FM 2316 south (McRae Boulevard)	
El Paso	El Paso			28	Global Reach Drive / Yarbrough Drive	Future west end of Montana Avenue Expressway
El Paso	El Paso			29	Lee Trevino Drive	Interchange under construction
El Paso	El Paso			30	George Dieter Drive	Interchange under construction
El Paso	El Paso			31	Lee Boulevard	Interchange under construction
El Paso	El Paso			32	Saul Klenfield Drive	Interchange under construction
El Paso	El Paso	33.2	53.4	33	Loop 375 (Purple Heart Memorial Highway, Joe Battle Boulevard)	Loop 375 exit 35; planned future stack interchange
El Paso	El Paso			34	Tierra Este Road	Planned future interchange
El Paso	El Paso			35	Rich Beem Boulevard	Planned future interchange
El Paso	El Paso	36.3	58.4	36	FM 659 (Zaragoza Road)	Interchange; future east end of Montana Avenue Expressway
El Paso		45.4	73.1		RM 2775 north – Hueco Tanks State Historic Site	
Hudspeth	Cornudas	81.5	131.2		RM 2317 south	
Hudspeth		88.3	142.1		RM 1111 south – Sierra Blanca	
Hudspeth		98.3	158.2		FM 1437 north – Dell City	
Hudspeth	Salt Flat	106.4	171.2		FM 1576 north – Dell City	
Culberson		120.5	193.9		SH 54 south – Van Horn	
Culberson		148.3	238.7		RM 652 east – Orla	
Culberson		148.4	238.8		US 62 / US 180 east – Carlsbad	New Mexico state line
US 180 crosses through New Mexico
Gaines		0.00	0.00		US 62 / US 180 west – Hobbs	New Mexico state line
Gaines		3.0	4.8		FM 3306 north	
Gaines		15.7	25.3		FM 1757 north	
Gaines	Seminole	24.1	38.8		SH 214 north – Denver City, Plains	
Gaines	Seminole	24.5	39.4		US 62 east / US 385 – Brownfield, Andrews	East end of US 62 overlap
Gaines		31.0	49.9		FM 1429 – Seagraves	
Gaines		37.9	61.0		FM 303 north – Loop	
Dawson		58.1	93.5		FM 829 north	West end of FM 829 overlap
Dawson		58.8	94.6		FM 829 south	East end of FM 829 overlap
Dawson	Lamesa	64.7	104.1		SH 137 to SH 349	Access to Medical Arts Hospital
Dawson	Lamesa	65.3	105.1		Bus. US 87 (Dallas Avenue)	
Dawson	Lamesa	65.4	105.3		US 87 north	West end of US 87 overlap
Dawson	see US 87					
Dawson		68.5	110.2		US 87 south / FM 2052 west – Midland	Interchange; east end of US 87 overlap
Dawson	Key	75.7	121.8		FM 178 – Midway	
Borden		84.9	136.6		FM 1054 south – Vealmoor	West end of FM 1054 overlap
Borden		89.3	143.7		FM 1054 north – O'Donnell	East end of FM 1054 overlap
Borden	Gail	97.0	156.1		FM 669 – Post, Big Spring	
Borden		106.6	171.6		FM 612 north – Fluvanna	
Borden		111.4	179.3		FM 1610 south – Lake J.B. Thomas	
Scurry		115.8	186.4		FM 1269 north – Fluvanna	
Scurry		120.6	194.1		FM 1606 south – Ira	
Scurry		123.8	199.2		FM 1609 south – Ira	
Scurry		125.5	202.0		FM 1611	
Scurry	Snyder	128.7	207.1		Bus. US 84 west (College Avenue) / SH 208 north / SH 350 west	West end of Bus. US 84/SH 208 overlap
Scurry	Snyder	130.9	210.7		FM 1605 west (37th Street)	Access to Cogdell Memorial Hospital
Scurry	Snyder	131.2	211.1		Bus. US 84 east / SH 208 south – Colorado City	East end of Bus. 84/SH 208 overlap
Scurry	Snyder	131.7	212.0		US 84 – Lubbock, Post, Roscoe	Interchange
Scurry		134.9	217.1		FM 1673 – Price Daniel Unit	
Scurry		136.8	220.2		FM 644 south – Hermleigh	
Scurry		142.7	229.7		FM 1614 east – Camp Springs	
Fisher		149.2	240.1		FM 611 – Hobbs, Rotan	
Fisher		154.3	248.3		FM 1657 north – Sardis, Crossroads	
Fisher		157.4	253.3		FM 2832 north – Rotan	
Fisher	Roby	160.0	257.5		FM 419 south	
Fisher	Roby	160.5	258.3		SH 70 – Rotan, Sweetwater	
Fisher		164.5	264.7		FM 1085 south – Sylvester	
Fisher		165.3	266.0		FM 1224 north – Royston	
Fisher		170.2	273.9		FM 57 – McCaulley, Sylvester	Interchange
Fisher		171.3	275.7		FM 1812 south – McCaulley Cemetery	Access to McCaulley Cemetery via County Road 283 north
Jones		178.3	286.9		FM 126 – Hamlin, Merkel	
Jones		185.6	298.7		FM 3116 south	
Jones	Anson	189.5	305.0		US 83 / US 277 – Stamford, Abilene	
Jones	Funston	195.0	313.8		FM 1226 – Stamford, Hawley	
Jones		200.0	321.9		FM 600 – Avoca, Nugent, Lake Fort Phantom	
Shackelford		207.4	333.8		SH 6 north – Lueders, Big Country Baptist Assembly	West end of SH 6 overlap
Shackelford		218.0	350.8		SH 351 west – Abilene	Interchange
Shackelford	Albany	225.6	363.1		US 283 south – Baird	West end of US 283 overlap
Shackelford	Albany	225.9	363.6		SH 6 south / FM 1084 north – Cisco	East end of SH 6 overlap
Shackelford	Albany	226.8	365.0		US 283 north – Throckmorton	East end of US 283 overlap
Shackelford		232.2	373.7		FM 2482 west – Fort Griffin State Historic Site	
Stephens		242.7	390.6		FM 3201 south	
Stephens		245.5	395.1		FM 2231 east	
Stephens	Breckenridge	247.3	398.0		FM 3099 north	
Stephens	Breckenridge	247.4	398.2		FM 3099 south	
Stephens	Breckenridge	249.7	401.9		US 183 (Breckenridge Avenue) – Woodson, Cisco	
Stephens	Breckenridge	250.7	403.5		FM 287 north (Graham Avenue)	
Stephens	Breckenridge	252.4	406.2		SH 67 north – Graham	
Stephens		253.6	408.1		FM 207 south	
Stephens		262.9	423.1		FM 717 north	West end of FM 717 overlap
Stephens		263.2	423.6		Loop 252 east – Caddo	
Stephens		264.1	425.0		PR 33 north / FM 717 south – Caddo, Ranger, Possum Kingdom Lake	East end of FM 717 overlap
Stephens		264.6	425.8		Loop 252 west – Caddo	
Palo Pinto	Brad	274.2	441.3		SH 16 north – Possum Kingdom Lake	West end of SH 16 overlap
Palo Pinto	Metcalf Gap	279.0	449.0		SH 16 south – Strawn	East end of SH 16 overlap
Palo Pinto		283.3	455.9		FM 919 south – Gordon	
Palo Pinto	Palo Pinto	288.0	463.5		FM 4 south – Santo, Lake Palo Pinto	West end of FM 4 overlap
Palo Pinto	Palo Pinto	288.5	464.3		FM 4 north – Worth Ranch, Graford	East end of FM 4 overlap
Palo Pinto	Mineral Wells	297.3	478.5		SH 337 north to SH 254 – Graham, Possum Kingdom Lake	
Palo Pinto	Mineral Wells	299.8	482.5		US 281 (Oak Avenue)	
Palo Pinto	Mineral Wells	301.5	485.2		FM 1821 (Garret Morris Parkway) – Jacksboro, Municipal Airport	
Palo Pinto	Mineral Wells	302.6	487.0		FM 1195 south – Municipal Airport	
Parker	Mineral Wells	303.8	488.9		PR 71 north – Lake Mineral Wells State Park	
Parker	Cool	306.7	493.6		FM 113 south – Millsap	West end of FM 113 overlap
Parker		307.3	494.6		FM 113 north – Garner	East end of FM 113 overlap
Parker	Weatherford	317.9	511.6		Spur 312 west (Ranger Highway) – Abilene	No left turn from Spur 312 to US 180; Spur 312 is former US 80
Parker	Weatherford	319.0	513.4		SH 171 south / FM 51 (Main Street)	Traffic circle
Parker	Weatherford	319.3	513.9		Business access	Interchange; westbound entrance only
Parker	Weatherford	319.5	514.2		Mill Street	Interchange; westbound exit and eastbound entrance
Parker	Weatherford	319.7	514.5		Jack Borden Drive (FM 2552 south)	
Parker	Weatherford	322.4	518.9		FM 730 north – Azle	
Parker	Hudson Oaks	324.8	522.7		I-20 east – Fort Worth	Interchange; no access to I-20 WB; I-20 west exit 414
1.000 mi = 1.609 km; 1.000 km = 0.621 mi: Concurrency terminus; Incomplete access; Unopened

U.S. Route 180
Previous state: New Mexico	Texas	Next state: New Mexico

U.S. Route 180
Previous state: New Mexico	Texas	Next state: Terminus
