= McCaulley, Texas =

Unincorporated community in Texas, US

McCaulley is an unincorporated community and census designated place (CDP) in Fisher County, Texas, United States. As of the 2020 census, McCaulley had a population of 79.

McCaulley is located at 32°46′43″N 100°12′19″W and is situated along FM 57 in eastern Fisher County, approximately nine miles southwest of Hamlin, approximately 14 miles northeast of Roby, and 38 miles northwest of Abilene.

Although McCaulley is unincorporated, it continues to have a post office in operation, with the zip code of 79534.

Public education in the community is provided by the Roby Consolidated Independent School District. On July 1, 1990, Roby ISD absorbed the entirety of the former McCauley Independent School District. The Hamlin Independent School District also serves areas considered McCaulley.

== Demographics ==
Historical population
Census	Pop.	Note	%±
2020	79		—
U.S. Decennial Census; 1850–1900 1910; 1920 1930 1940; 1950 1960 1970; 1980 1990 2000; 2010 2020

McCaulley first appeared as a census designated place in the 2020 U.S. census.

=== 2020 census ===
McCaulley CDP, Texas – Racial and ethnic composition Note: the US Census treats Hispanic/Latino as an ethnic category. This table excludes Latinos from the racial categories and assigns them to a separate category. Hispanics/Latinos may be of any race.
Race / Ethnicity (NH = Non-Hispanic)	Pop 2020	% 2020
White alone (NH)	72	91.14%
Black or African American alone (NH)	0	0.00%
Native American or Alaska Native alone (NH)	0	0.00%
Asian alone (NH)	1	1.27%
Native Hawaiian or Pacific Islander alone (NH)	0	0.00%
Other race alone (NH)	0	0.00%
Mixed race or Multiracial (NH)	0	0.00%
Hispanic or Latino (any race)	6	7.59%
Total	79	100.00%
