= Del Thompson =

American football player (born 1958)

No. 39
- Position: Running back

Personal information
- Born: February 21, 1958 (age 68); Kermit, Texas, U.S.
- Listed height: 6 ft 0 in (1.83 m)
- Listed weight: 203 lb (92 kg)

Career information
- High school: Hamlin (Hamlin, Texas)
- College: UTEP
- NFL draft: 1982: 5th round, 130th overall pick

Career history
- Kansas City Chiefs (1982–1983); New York Jets (1984)*
- * Offseason or practice squad member only

Career NFL statistics
- Rushing yards: 7
- Rushing average: 1.8
- Stats at Pro Football Reference

Delbert Ray Thompson (born February 21, 1958) is an American former professional football player who was a running back for one season with the Kansas City Chiefs of the National Football League (NFL). He was selected by the Chiefs in the fifth round of the 1982 NFL draft. He played college football at the University of Texas at Austin, Ranger College and the University of Texas at El Paso.

== Early life and college ==
Delbert Ray Thompson was born on February 21, 1958, in Kermit, Texas. He attended Hamlin High School in Hamlin, Texas.

Thompson first played college football for the Texas Longhorns of the University of Texas at Austin in 1977, totaling five carries for 32 yards, one reception for 18 yards, and one punt return for two yards. He later transferred to Ranger College. He was then a two-year letterman for the UTEP Miners of the University of Texas at El Paso from 1980 to 1981.

== Professional career ==
Thompson was selected by the Kansas City Chiefs in the fifth round, with the 130th overall pick, of the 1982 NFL draft. He played in six games for the Chiefs during the 1982 season, recording four carries for seven yards, two kick returns for 41 yards, and one fumble recovery. He was placed on the injured reserve list on August 23, 1983. Thompson was waived on March 20, 1984.

Thompson was claimed on waivers by the New York Jets on April 10, 1984. He was released by the Jets on July 13, 1984.
