= Roby and Northern Railroad =

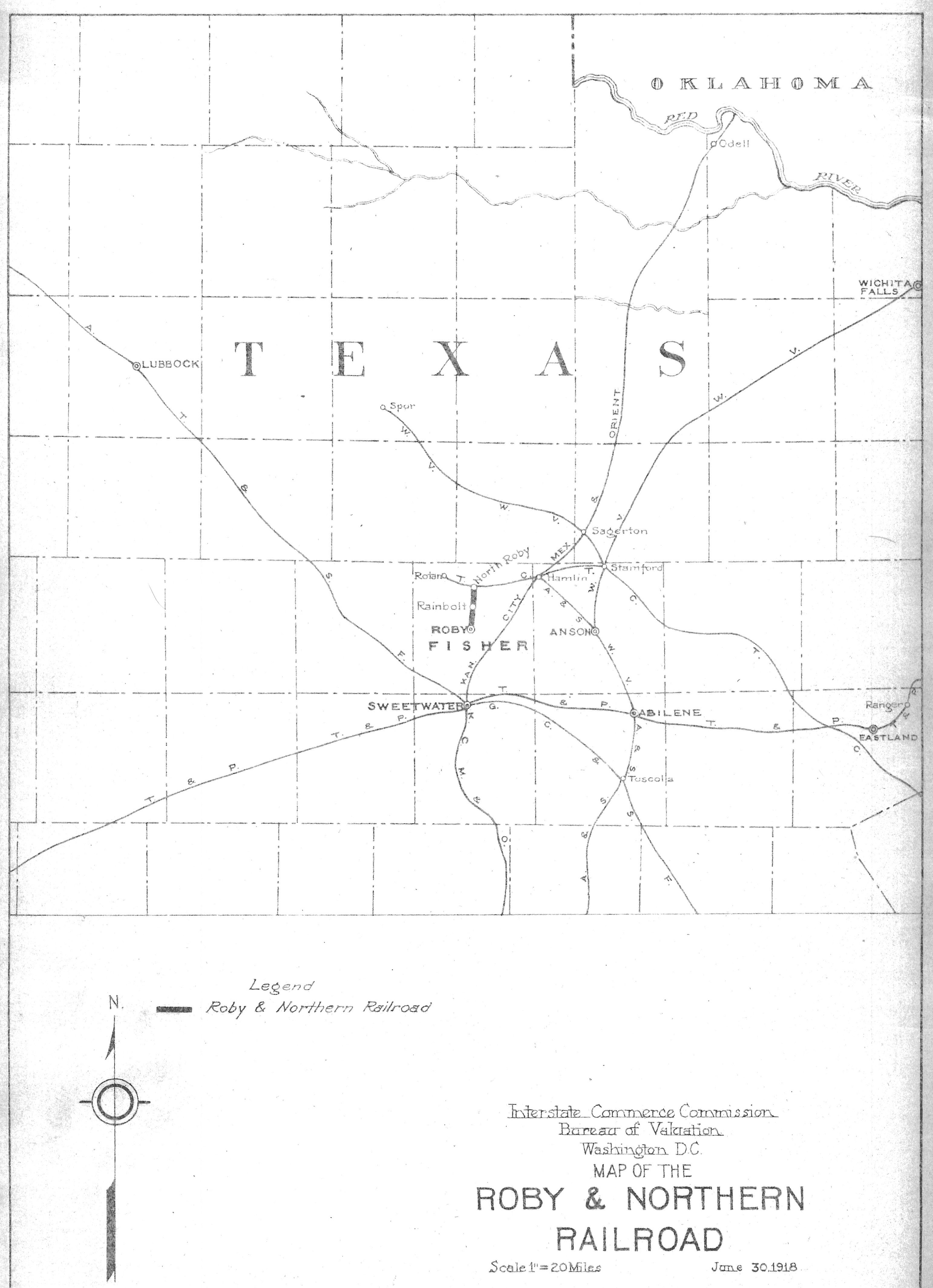
1918 map of the railroad

The Roby and Northern Railroad was constructed in 1915 to connect the agricultural community of Roby, Texas with a connection to the Missouri, Kansas and Texas Railway at North Roby, then known as Old Fisher, both located in Fisher County, Texas, a few miles north of Sweetwater. There was a need to move agricultural products (such as cotton) passengers, and livestock the 4.5 miles (7.2 km) north to the Waco-Rotan branch of the MKT.

The original railroad was equipped with steam locomotives, but in 1922 the owners made the decision to abandon the line. The concerned citizens of Roby were able to raise $10,000.00 to assist the local utility company, West Texas Utilities Company, to convert the railroad to electrical power. This was accomplished in 1923, and rail service was to be continued. The operating corporation was headquartered in Roby. The electric locomotive was shipped in parts to Memphis Tennessee from back east and assembled from its various component parts before being transferred to Roby, where on November 22, 1923, the new electrified Roby and Northern Railroad resumed operations. This made the Roby and Northern the only electrified interurban in West Texas.

The railroad continued operations until 1941 when a shortage of business, a lack of employees due to World War II, and the more pressing need for scrap iron all contributed to the abandonment of the railroad.
