= Justin Rowland =

American football player (born 1937)

No. 20, 47, 33
- Position: Defensive back

Personal information
- Born: May 10, 1937 (age 89); Hamlin, Texas, U.S.
- Listed height: 6 ft 2 in (1.88 m)
- Listed weight: 188 lb (85 kg)

Career information
- High school: Hamlin
- College: TCU
- NFL draft: 1959: 12th round, 140th overall pick

Career history
- Chicago Bears (1960); Minnesota Vikings (1961); Denver Broncos (1962)

Career NFL/AFL statistics
- Interceptions: 1
- Sacks: 1
- Stats at Pro Football Reference

Justin David Rowland (born May 10, 1937) is an American former professional football player who was a defensive back in the National Football League (NFL) with the Chicago Bears and Minnesota Vikings and in the American Football League (AFL) for the Denver Broncos. He played college football for the TCU Horned Frogs.
