= Rotan High School =

Rotan Secondary High School

Location
- 102 North McKinley Avenue; Rotan, Texas 79546-4609; United States; 32.853291°N 100.463976°W

Information
- School type: Public high school
- School district: Rotan Independent School District
- Principal: Jody Helms
- Teaching staff: 27.46 (FTE)
- Grades: K-12
- Enrollment: 271 (2023-2024)
- Student to teacher ratio: 9.87
- Colors: Orange & White
- Athletics conference: UIL Class A
- Mascot: Yellowhammer
- Yearbook: The Yellowhammer
- Website: Rotan High School

Rotan High School is a public high school located in Rotan, Texas, United States and classified as a 1A school by the UIL. It is part of the Rotan Independent School District located in southern Fisher County. In 2015, the school was rated "Met Standard" by the Texas Education Agency.

== Athletics ==
The Rotan Yellowhammers compete in these sports -

- Baseball
- Basketball
- Cross Country
- 6-man Football
- Softball
- Tennis
- Track and Field
- Volleyball

=== State titles ===
- Football -
  - 1962(1A)
- Boys Track -
  - 1962(1A), 1989(1A)
