= Roby High School =

Coordinates: 32.7434°N 100.3786°W

Location
- P.O. Box 519; Roby, Texas 79543-0519; United States

Information
- School type: Public high school
- School district: Roby Consolidated Independent School District
- Principal: Jason Carter
- Staff: 33.15 (FTE)
- Grades: K-12
- Enrollment: 307 (2023–2024)
- Student to teacher ratio: 9.26
- Colors: Red & Black
- Athletics conference: UIL Class 1A
- Mascot: Lion/Lady Lion
- Yearbook: Tumbleweed
- Website: Roby High School

Roby High School is a public high school located in the city of Roby, Texas, USA and classified as a 1A school by the UIL. It is a part of the Roby Consolidated Independent School District, a consolidation of McCauley and Roby in 1990 that is located in central Fisher County. In 2015, the school was rated "Met Standard" by the Texas Education Agency.

== Athletics ==
The Roby Lions compete in these sports -

Cross Country, Football, Basketball, Powerlifting, Golf, Tennis, Track, Baseball & Softball

=== State Titles ===
- Girls Basketball
  - 2009 (1A/D2)
- Girls Cross Country
  - 2023 (1A)

==== State Finalists ====
  - 2008 (1A/D2), 2016 (1A)

== Band ==
- Marching Band Sweepstakes Champions
  - 1980(1A)
