= Hobbs, Texas =

- Unincorporated community
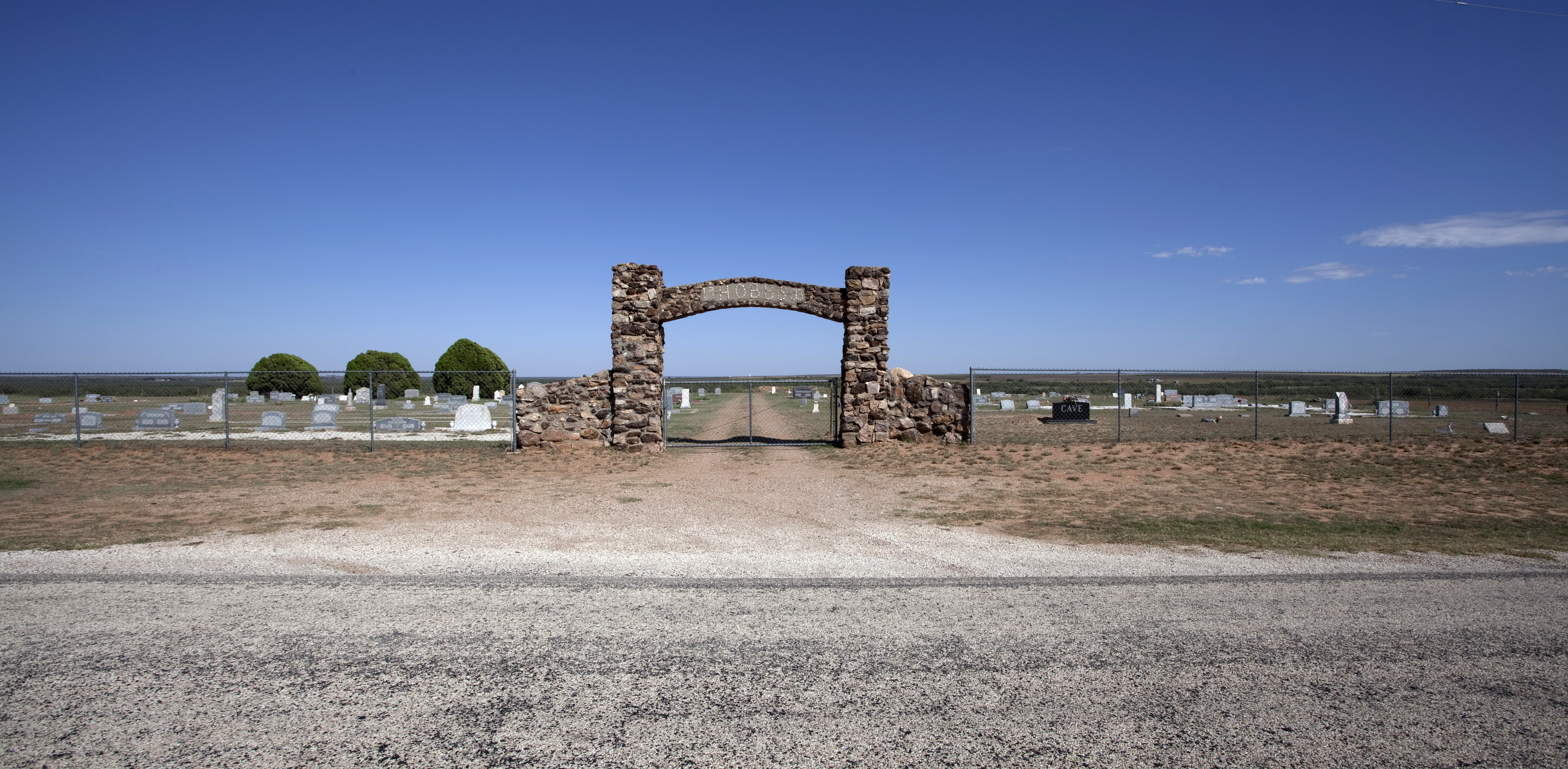
- Hobbs Cemetery

- Location within Texas Location within the United States
- Coordinates: 32°46′53″N 100°35′30″W
- Country: United States
- State: Texas
- County: Fisher
- Region: West Texas
- Post office established: 1888
- Elevation: 2,067 ft (630 m)
- Time zone: UTC-6 (CST)
- Area code: 806
- GNIS feature ID: 1337854

Hobbs is an unincorporated community in west Fisher County, Texas, United States. It is located at the intersection of Farm to Market Roads 611 and 1614, about 20 mi (32 km) east of Snyder. It lies within the physiographic region known as the Rolling Plains in the valley of the Clear Fork Brazos River.

== History ==
A number of homesteaders moved into the area to form the nucleus of a community in the mid-1880s. A post office was opened on May 26, 1888, and residents chose the name Hobbs for Vachel Hobbs Anderson, a local settler. Unfortunately, the post office was discontinued February 15, 1910. By 1914, the community had a general store, telephone service, and a population of 45. Hobbs received electricity in 1939, and in 1940, the community had three businesses, a school, a Baptist church, a number of scattered dwellings, and a population of 70. The Hobbs Co-op Cotton Gin was organized in the 1940s. From 1970 through 2000, the population of the community remained steady at an estimated 91.

== Education ==
Robert Martin, a Baptist preacher, held camp meetings and opened a school in the community in 1887, using a tent until a combination school and church building was erected the following year. The church-school was called Buffalo, for its location on Buffalo Creek, a tributary of the Clear Fork Brazos River. A new school building was erected in 1908, and the name of the school was changed to Hobbs. The new school gradually became the center of this dispersed community. In 1925, a number of small schools consolidated to form the Hobbs Rural High School District, and a two-story brick high school was constructed. Hobbs High School was replaced with a new building in 1956, but was closed in 1989, and pupils are now bused to Rotan, Roby, or Snyder.

== See also ==
- Brazos River
- Double Mountain Fork Brazos River
- Duffy's Peak
- Hobbs, New Mexico
- List of ghost towns in Texas
- Wastella, Texas
