= Caddo, Stephens County, Texas =

Unincorporated community in Texas, US

Coordinates: 32°43′05″N 98°40′06″W

Caddo is an unincorporated community in Stephens County, Texas, United States. According to the Handbook of Texas, the community had an estimated population of 40 in 2000. Caddo has a post office, with the ZIP code of 76429.

== Geography ==
Caddo is situated at the junction of U.S. Highway 180, Farm to Market Road 717, and Park Road 33 in east-central Stephens County, approximately 10 miles east of Breckenridge.

== History ==
The community, which takes its name from being located on a former Caddo Indian campsite, was established in the late 1870s. By 1880, Caddo had an estimated population of 60 with two churches, a school, and a post office. The number of residents had grown to 75 in 1890 and 149 in 1900. The nearby Ranger oil boom of 1916-1917 caused Caddo's population to increase to roughly 1,000 by 1920. Around 600 people were living in Caddo in 1940. By 1980, only 40 residents remained. That figure remained virtually unchanged through 2000.

== Education ==
Public education in the community of Caddo is provided by the Breckenridge Independent School District.

== Notable person ==
- James H. Fields, a World War II Congressional Medal of Honor recipient
