= Texas Park Road 33 =

Highway in Texas, United States

PR 33
- PR 33 highlighted in red

Route information
- Maintained by TxDOT
- Length: 17.280 mi (27.809 km)
- Existed: 1944–present

Major junctions
- South end: US 180 near Caddo
- North end: Possum Kingdom State Park

Location
- Country: United States
- State: Texas
- Counties: Stephens, Palo Pinto

Highway system
- Highways in Texas; Interstate; US; State; Former; Toll; Loops; Spurs; FM/RM; Park; Rec
← RM 33	→ SH 34

Park Road 33 (PR 33) is a park road in north central Texas that runs from Caddo to Possum Kingdom State Park.

== Route description ==
PR 33 begins south of the unincorporated community of Caddo in Stephens County, at a junction with US 180 and FM 717. The route travels to the north through Caddo before turning eastward after its intersection with FM 3253. The highway turns to the northeast before entering Palo Pinto County and Possum Kingdom State Park. Within the park, the route curves to the north and then to the northwest; a spur route, signed as PR 33A, branches off to the northeast and provides access to boat launching and camping areas. The PR 33 designation ends within the park, near the Park Store and Marina.

== History ==
PR 33 was first designated along its current route in 1944. While TxDOT does not indicate the actual date of construction, the road was most likely complete by 1950, when the park itself was opened to the public. The spur extension within the park was designated in 1960.

== Major intersections ==
County	Location	mi	km	Destinations	Notes
Stephens		0.0	0.0	US 180 / FM 717 north – Breckenridge, Mineral Wells	Southern terminus; continues as FM 717
Stephens	Caddo	0.4	0.64	Loop 252	
Stephens		8.5	13.7	FM 3253 to FM 1148	
Palo Pinto	Possum Kingdom State Park	16.8	27.0	Spur to boat launch and camping area	
Palo Pinto	Possum Kingdom State Park	17.3	27.8	Park roadway	Northern terminus
1.000 mi = 1.609 km; 1.000 km = 0.621 mi
