= North Roby, Texas =

Coordinates: 32°48′24″N 100°23′13″W

North Roby, also known as Fisher, is a ghost town in north central Fisher County, Texas, United States. The community lies four and one half miles north of Roby. Its altitude is 1,933 feet.

The town was founded in 1885 by E.D. Strang, who suggested that it become the county seat for Fisher County. It had a population of 200 by 1890 and had three stores, a hotel, and a blacksmithy.

An electric trolley line known as Roby and Northern Railroad was built to connect North Roby to Roby in 1915.

Fisher County Airport is in the area.

== See also ==
- List of ghost towns in Texas
