= Rotan Independent School District =

School district in Texas

Coordinates: 32.8530°N 100.4649°W

Rotan Independent School District is a public independent school district (ISD) based in Rotan, Texas, United States. Located in southern Fisher County, small portions of the district extend into Kent and Stonewall Counties.

== History ==
On July 1, 1990, the district absorbed a portion of the Hobbs ISD.

== Academic achievement ==
In 2009, the ISD was rated "academically acceptable" by the Texas Education Agency.

== Schools ==
Rotan ISD has four campuses -

- Rotan High School (grades 9-12)
- Rotan Junior High School (grades 6-8)
- Rotan Elementary School (kindergarten-grade 5)
- Prekindergarten-Headstart

== Special programs ==
=== Athletics ===
Rotan High School plays six-man football.
