= Sylvester, Texas =

Unincorporated community in Texas, United States

Sylvester
- Unincorporated community
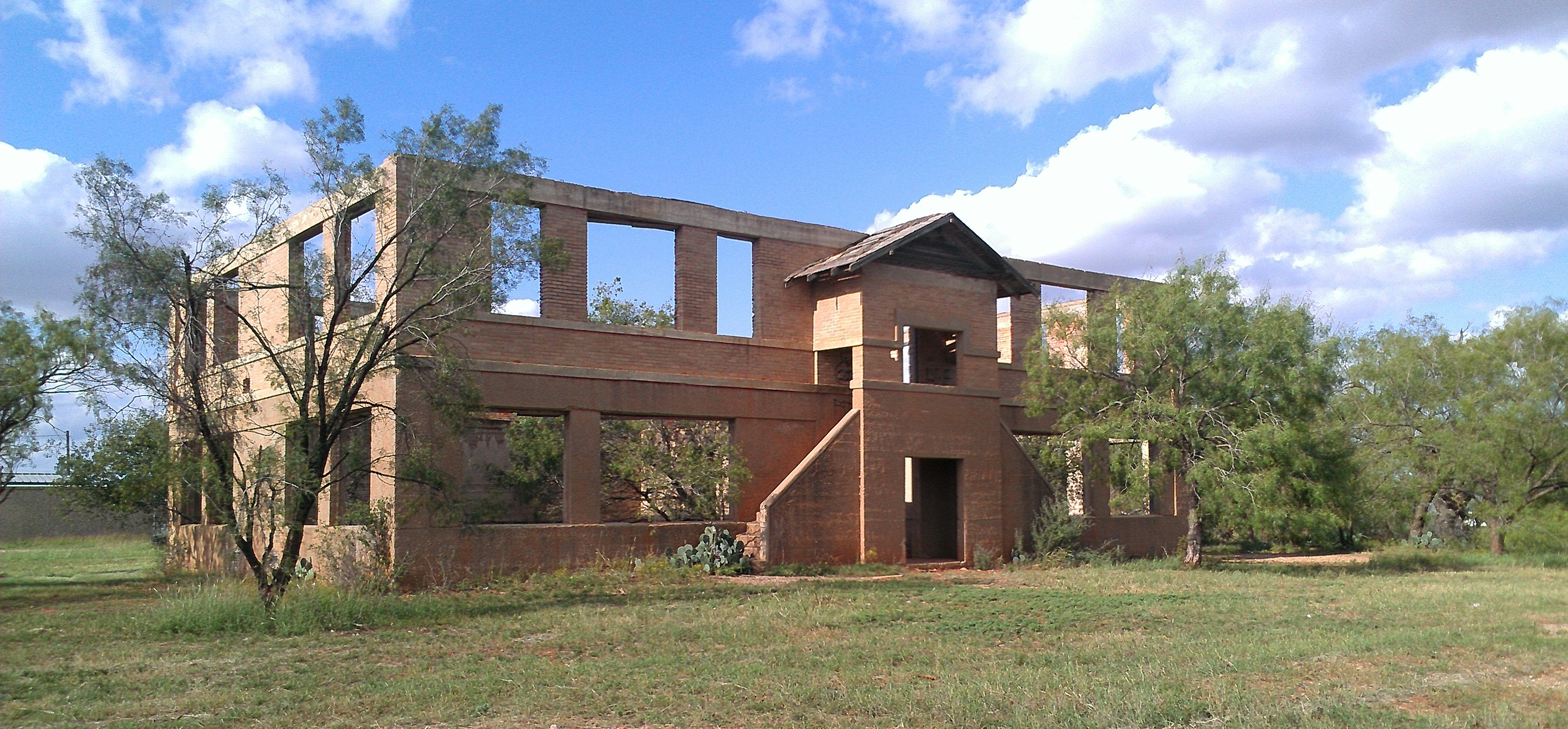
- The abandoned Sylvester School
- Interactive map of Sylvester
- Location in Texas Location in the United States
- Coordinates: 32°43′19″N 100°15′02″W
- Country: United States
- State: Texas
- County: Fisher

Population (2020)
  - Total: 52
  - Estimate (2025): 31
- Demonym: Sylvestian
- Time zone: UTC-6 (CST)
  - Summer (DST): UTC-5 (CDT)
- ZIP Codes: 79560
- Area code: 325

Sylvester is an unincorporated community in Fisher County, Texas, United States. According to the Handbook of Texas, the community had an estimated population of 79 in 2000.

== Geography ==
Sylvester is located at the junction of Farm Roads 57 and 1085 in east central Fisher County, approximately 10 miles southeast of Roby and 43 miles northwest of Abilene.

== History ==
The Compere brothers of Abilene are credited with the founding of the community in 1903. They bought part of the AJ Ranch in anticipation of the arrival of the Kansas, Mexico and Orient Railway and named it in honor of W.W. Sylvester, the railroad's promotion manager. The rails reached Sylvester in 1905 and businesses followed. By 1909, the community had an estimated population of 600. Sylvester incorporated in 1927 and the 1930 census reported 382 residents. That figure rose to 405 in 1940. Competition from nearby towns caused Sylvester to decline. It had reverted to unincorporated status by 1950 and by the 1980s, fewer than 100 people remained in the community, but supported a grocery store, Sylvester Mercantile, owned and operated by C. L. "Chubb" Hardwick, a cotton gin owned operated by the Jeffery family of McCaulley and a gas station owned and operated by Truman Mauldin, as well as a seasonal granary.

Although Sylvester is unincorporated, it continues to have a post office in operation, with the zip code of 79560. During the 1960s and 1970s, the U.S. Post Office was managed by Postmaster Mrs. Buford (Ruth Brown), who retired in the late 1970s. Mrs. Bobbie Hardwick was postmaster until her retirement in 1999.

== Demographics ==
Historical population
Census	Pop.	Note	%±
2020	52		—
U.S. Decennial Census; 1850–1900 1910; 1920 1930 1940; 1950 1960 1970; 1980 1990 2000; 2010 2020

Sylvester first appeared as a census designated place in the 2020 U.S. census.

=== 2020 census ===
Sylvester CDP, Texas – Racial and ethnic composition Note: the US Census treats Hispanic/Latino as an ethnic category. This table excludes Latinos from the racial categories and assigns them to a separate category. Hispanics/Latinos may be of any race.
Race / Ethnicity (NH = Non-Hispanic)	Pop 2020	% 2020
White alone (NH)	40	76.92%
Black or African American alone (NH)	0	0.00%
Native American or Alaska Native alone (NH)	0	0.00%
Asian alone (NH)	0	0.00%
Native Hawaiian or Pacific Islander alone (NH)	0	0.00%
Other race alone (NH)	0	0.00%
Mixed race or Multiracial (NH)	1	1.92%
Hispanic or Latino (any race)	11	21.15%
Total	52	100.00%

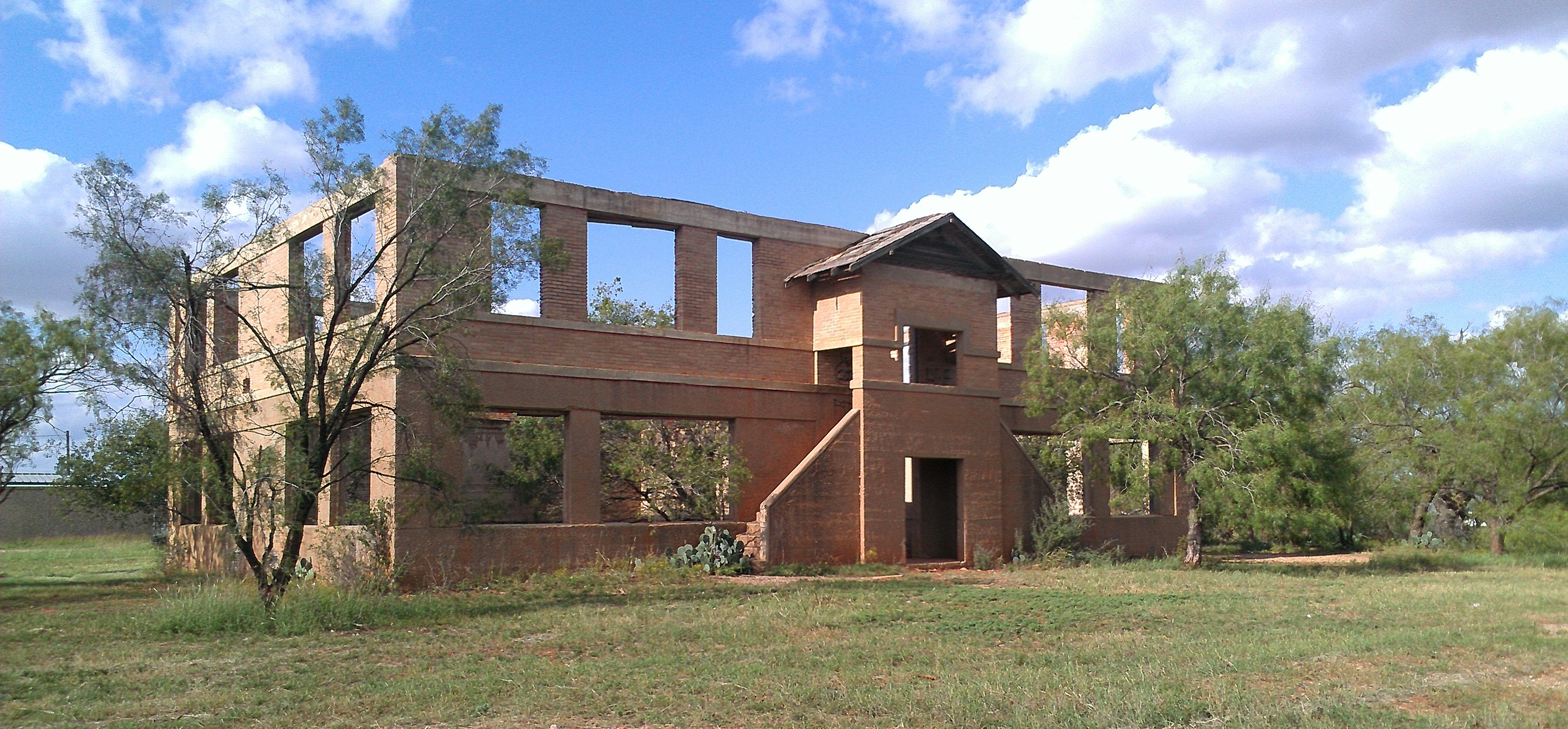
The abandoned Sylvester School

== Education ==
Sylvester had an elementary school and high school in one building. The first senior class graduated in 1914. The school closed in the summer of 1953, and students began attending schools in the Roby Consolidated Independent School District.
