= Roby Consolidated Independent School District =

School district in Roby, Texas, United States

Roby Consolidated Independent School District is a public school district based in Roby, Texas (USA). Located in Fisher County, a small portion of the district extends into Jones County. The district also serves the unincorporated communities of Sylvester and McCaulley. All students attend classes in Roby.

Roby Consolidated ISD has two campuses -

- Roby High School(Grades 9-12)
- Roby Elementary/Junior High (Grades PK-8).

In 2009, the school district was rated "recognized" by the Texas Education Agency.

== History ==
On July 1, 1990, Roby ISD absorbed the entirety of McCauley Independent School District and a portion of Hobbs Independent School District.

== Controversy ==
In July 2024, the ACLU of Texas sent Roby Consolidated Independent School District a letter, alleging that the district's 2023-2024 dress and grooming code appeared to violate the Texas CROWN Act, a state law which prohibits racial discrimination based on hair texture or styles, and asking the district to revise its policies for the 2024-2025 school year.
