= Royston, Texas =

Ghost town in Texas, United States

Coordinates: 32°48′42″N 100°17′54″W

Royston is a ghost town in northeastern Fisher County, Texas, United States, 10 miles (16 km) northeast of Roby. Historical Marker at Royston site: It was founded in 1907, and had a population of 500 in 1909. That figure declined to 75 by 1940, 30 in 1980 and 1990, and no figures were available by 2000.

== History ==
Royston Townsite - The town of Royston was established in 1907, when the Texas Central Railroad built a line through this area. In addition to the railroad depot, homes and businesses were soon established in the new town. The Royston Post Office was also established in 1907. Businesses included a 30-room hotel, the "Royston Record" weekly newspaper, the Royston Mercantile Company, the Royston State Bank, a cotton gin, tin shop, grocery and hardware store, drug store, restaurant, and two lumberyards. A public school was in operation until 1947, when it was consolidated with McCaulley School. Churches in the town included Methodist, Baptist, and Pentecostal. The center of a rich agricultural area, Royston's economic base was broadened after the discovery of oil in the area in 1928. The railroad continued both freight and passenger service until 1972, and Royston was an important supply center for the surrounding agricultural area for a number of years. The town of Royston gradually declined, and the rails were removed by the railroad company. This site marks the approximate southern boundary of the town square. Now a ghost town, it is nevertheless an important part of Fisher County history.

== See also ==
- List of ghost towns in Texas
