= James H. Fields =

United States Army Medal of Honor recipient (1920–1970)

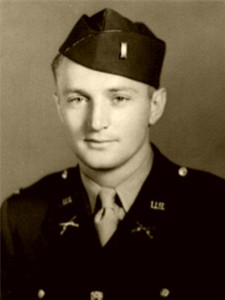
- Fields as a Lieutenant
- Born: James Hershel Fields; June 26, 1920; Caddo, Texas
- Died: June 17, 1970 (aged 49); Houston, Texas
- Burial place: Houston National Cemetery, Houston, Texas
- Military career
- Allegiance: United States of America
- Branch: United States Army
- Rank: Captain
- Units: 10th Armored Infantry Battalion, 4th Armored Division
- Conflicts: World War II
- Awards: Medal of Honor; Silver Star; Bronze Star (3); Purple Heart; French Croix de Guerre with palm

James H. Fields (June 26, 1920 – June 17, 1970) was a United States Army captain and a recipient of the United States military's highest decoration for valor—the Medal of Honor—for his actions in France during World War II.

== Biography ==
Fields was born in Caddo, Texas, on June 26, 1920. He graduated from the first graduating class from Mirabeau Lamar High School in Houston, Texas, in 1939. He attended the University of Oklahoma before he was drafted into the U.S. Army from Houston in February 1942, and by September 27, 1944, was serving as a first lieutenant and a platoon commander in Company A, 10th Armored Infantry Battalion (re-designated from the 10th Armored Infantry Regiment in September 1943), 4th Armored Division.

On September 27, 1944, following orders he led his first platoon of Company A at night to take a position located on top of Hill 265 near Rechicourt, France. As they marched forward he heard German voices and instructed his platoon to dig in. In the morning the Germans attacked, pinning his platoon down by withering crossfire from two machine guns and the threat of a German tank. Half of his platoon was either killed or wounded. He contacted his unit's anti-tank officer for support but the tank officer refused because he stated he would get destroyed. The second lieutenant insisted on surrendering and Fields replied "I would rather die than surrender." In the ensuing battle, he instructed his only medic to stay in his foxhole; no sooner had he had given the order, the medic abandoned his position and was shot dead. As Fields described the situation, "The medic was five pounds heavier with lead when he fell." Fields then picked up a Colt .45 attempting to save the medic, and while doing so was shot through the face, knocking out his back molars and almost severing his tongue in half. Undeterred, Fields obtained some gauze and wedged it in his mouth to limit the bleeding. He then picked up a .30 caliber machine gun, and firing from the hip with such deadly accuracy was able to silence both enemy machine guns. Because of his actions the men regained their courage. He directed his remaining platoon with hand signals to return bazooka fire to stop the tank and repel the attack. Fields refused to be evacuated at the command center until he reported his position and the strength of the enemy. After reporting he asked where the tank officer was and he began pummeling him for his cowardice. Fields was awarded the Medal of Honor five months later, on February 27, 1945.

James H. Fields was the first person decorated in the field with the Medal of Honor by General George S. Patton Jr., and was promoted to captain. After Fields received his Medal of Honor, General Patton sent Fields back to the United States. General Patton stated in his memoir "War as I Knew It," "I told Gaffey I did not want Lieutenant Fields sent to the front again, because it has been my unfortunate observation that whenever a man gets the Medal of Honor or even the Distinguished Service Cross, he usually attempts to outdo himself and gets killed, whereas, in order to produce a virile race, such men should be kept alive."

After the war, he became an independent oil operator in Texas, married, and had four children. He died on June 17, 1970, at age 49. He was buried on June 20 in the Houston National Cemetery, in Houston, Texas.

== Awards and decorations ==
Field's military awards include:

Badge	Combat Infantryman Badge		
1st row	Medal of Honor	Silver Star	Bronze Star Medal
2nd row	Purple Heart	Army Good Conduct Medal	American Campaign Medal
3rd row	European–African–Middle Eastern Campaign Medal with 1 campaign star	World War II Victory Medal	French Croix de guerre

== Medal of Honor citation ==
Fields' Medal of Honor citation reads:

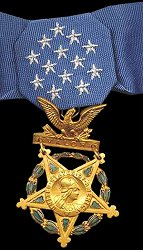
MedalofHonor

For conspicuous gallantry and intrepidity at risk of life above and beyond the call of duty, at Rechicourt, France. On September 27, 1944, during a sharp action with the enemy infantry and tank forces, 1st Lt. Fields personally led his platoon in a counterattack on the enemy position. Although his platoon had been seriously depleted, the zeal and fervor of his leadership was such as to inspire his small force to accomplish their mission in the face of overwhelming enemy opposition. Seeing that one of the men had been wounded, he left his slit trench and with complete disregard for his personal safety attended the wounded man and administered first aid. While returning to his slit trench he was seriously wounded by a shell burst, the fragments of which cut through his face and head, tearing his teeth, gums, and nasal passage. Although rendered speechless by his wounds, 1st Lt. Fields refused to be evacuated and continued to lead his platoon by the use of hand signals. On one occasion, when two enemy machine guns had a portion of his unit under deadly crossfire, he left his hole, wounded as he was, ran to a light machine gun, whose crew had been knocked out, picked up the gun, and fired it from his hip with such deadly accuracy that both the enemy gun positions were silenced. His action so impressed his men that they found new courage to take up the fire fight, increasing their firepower, and exposing themselves more than ever to harass the enemy with additional bazooka and machine gun fire. Only when his objective had been taken and the enemy scattered did 1st Lt. Fields consent to be evacuated to the battalion command post. At this point he refused to move further back until he had explained to his battalion commander by drawing on paper the position of his men and the disposition of the enemy forces. The dauntless and gallant heroism displayed by 1st Lt. Fields were largely responsible for the repulse of the enemy forces and contributed in a large measure to the successful capture of his battalion objective during this action. His eagerness and determination to close with the enemy and to destroy him was an inspiration to the entire command, and are in the highest traditions of the U.S. Armed Forces.

== See also ==
- List of Medal of Honor recipients
- List of Medal of Honor recipients for World War II
