= Ella Hudson Day =

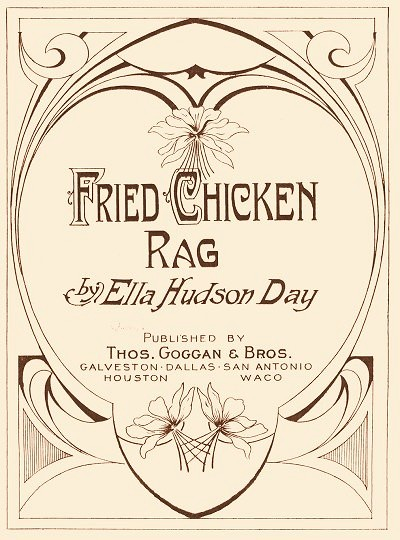
Ella Hudson Day's Fried Chicken Rag from 1912

Ella Hudson Day (born Luella Lucile Hudson; 1876 – November 4, 1951) was a ragtime musician from Texas best known for "Fried Chicken Rag." She also wrote a few works about Texas due to an "overflow of patriotism." She also stated, "I do not write music because I want to – I write it because I must get it out of my system and that seems the only practical way to do it."

Her husband, Eugene Day, and she moved to Rotan, Texas, in 1907, where they helped to found the settlement.
