= Hamlin Collegiate Independent School District =

School district in Texas

Hamlin Collegiate Independent School District is a public school district based in Hamlin, Texas, United States.

Located in Jones County, small portions of the district extend into Fisher and Stonewall Counties.

The school mascot is the Pied Piper, due to the town having a similar name to Hamelin, where the legend of the Pied Piper of Hamelin originated.

In 2009, the school district was rated "academically acceptable" by the Texas Education Agency.

== Schools ==
- Hamlin High School (grades 9-12)
- Hamlin Middle (grades 6-8)
- Hamlin Elementary (prekindergarten - grade 5)
