= Rotan, Texas =

- City
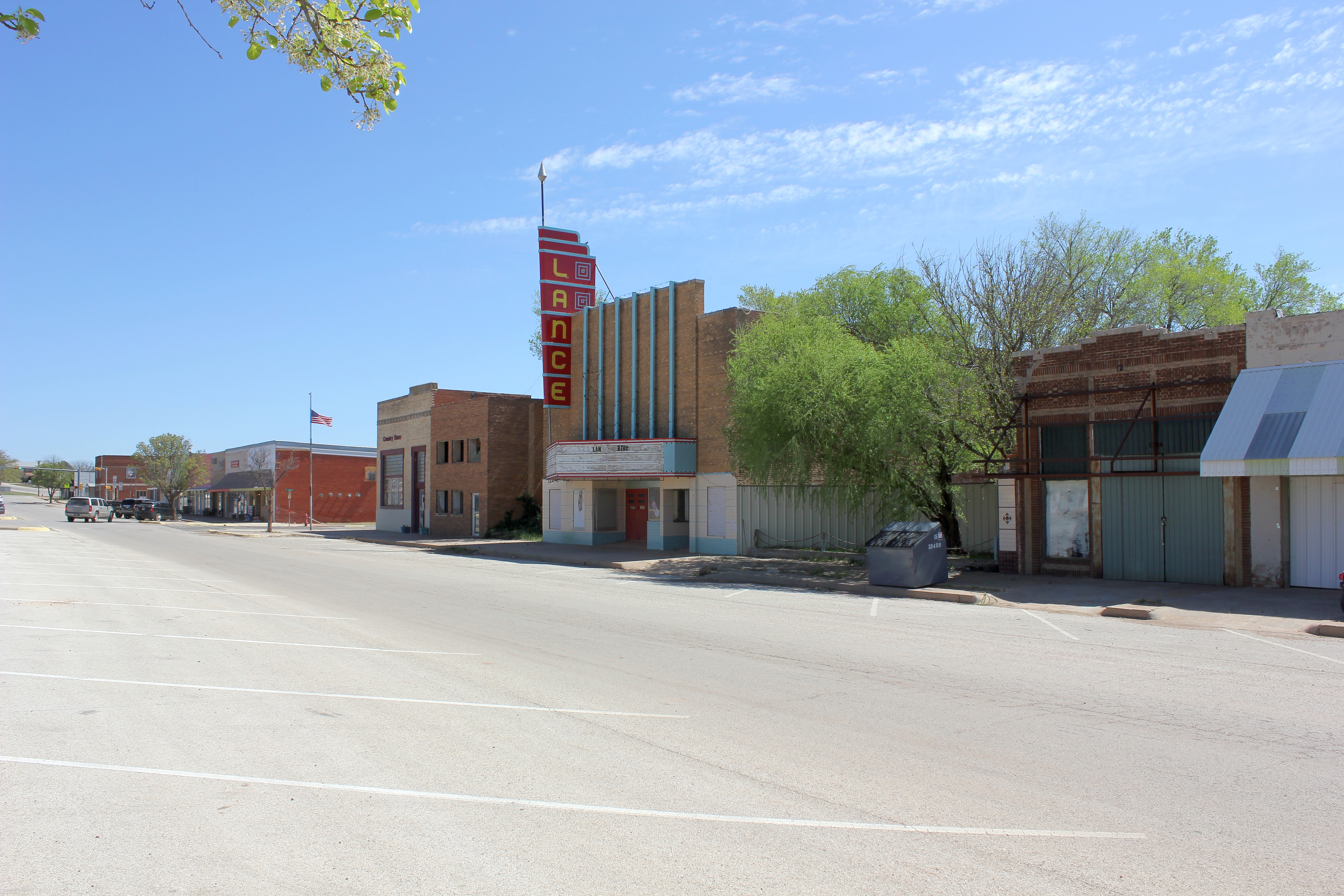
- Rotan, Texas

- Location within Texas Location within the United States
- Coordinates: 32°51′15″N 100°27′56″W
- Country: United States
- State: Texas
- County: Fisher

Area
  - Total: 2.02 sq mi (5.24 km^{2})
  - Land: 2.02 sq mi (5.24 km^{2})
  - Water: 0 sq mi (0.00 km^{2})
- Elevation: 1,962 ft (598 m)

Population (2020)
  - Total: 1,332
  - Density: 658/sq mi (254/km^{2})
- Time zone: UTC-6 (Central (CST))
  - Summer (DST): UTC-5 (CDT)
- ZIP code: 79546
- Area code: 325
- FIPS code: 48-63464
- GNIS feature ID: 2411004

Rotan is a city in Fisher County, Texas, United States. Its population was 1,332 at the 2020 census, down from 1,508 at the 2010 census.

== Geography ==
Texas State Highway 70 passes through the city, leading north 34 miles (55 km) to Jayton and south 9 miles (14 km) to Roby, the Fisher County seat, and 30 miles (48 km) to Sweetwater and Interstate 20. Texas State Highway 92 leads east from Rotan 20 miles (32 km) to Hamlin.

According to the United States Census Bureau, Rotan has a total area of 2.0 mi^{2} (5.2 km^{2}), all land.

=== Climate ===
Rotan's climate type occurs primarily on the periphery of the true deserts in low-latitude semiarid steppe regions. The Köppen climate classification subtype for this climate is BSh (tropical and subtropical steppe climate).

Climate data for Rotan, Texas (1991–2020 normals, extremes 1962–2020)
Month	Jan	Feb	Mar	Apr	May	Jun	Jul	Aug	Sep	Oct	Nov	Dec	Year
Record high °F (°C)	85 (29)	92 (33)	100 (38)	106 (41)	110 (43)	116 (47)	112 (44)	112 (44)	108 (42)	101 (38)	92 (33)	84 (29)	116 (47)
Mean daily maximum °F (°C)	56.4 (13.6)	61.0 (16.1)	69.2 (20.7)	78.5 (25.8)	85.8 (29.9)	92.5 (33.6)	95.7 (35.4)	95.0 (35.0)	87.1 (30.6)	77.9 (25.5)	66.3 (19.1)	57.5 (14.2)	76.9 (24.9)
Daily mean °F (°C)	44.9 (7.2)	49.1 (9.5)	56.7 (13.7)	65.8 (18.8)	74.4 (23.6)	82.0 (27.8)	85.2 (29.6)	84.2 (29.0)	76.6 (24.8)	66.4 (19.1)	54.8 (12.7)	46.5 (8.1)	65.5 (18.6)
Mean daily minimum °F (°C)	33.5 (0.8)	37.1 (2.8)	44.2 (6.8)	53.1 (11.7)	63.1 (17.3)	71.5 (21.9)	74.6 (23.7)	73.4 (23.0)	66.0 (18.9)	55.0 (12.8)	43.4 (6.3)	35.5 (1.9)	54.2 (12.3)
Record low °F (°C)	3 (−16)	−5 (−21)	7 (−14)	24 (−4)	35 (2)	46 (8)	57 (14)	54 (12)	35 (2)	20 (−7)	15 (−9)	−5 (−21)	−5 (−21)
Average precipitation inches (mm)	0.95 (24)	1.33 (34)	1.68 (43)	1.77 (45)	3.15 (80)	2.94 (75)	1.96 (50)	2.18 (55)	2.72 (69)	2.27 (58)	1.53 (39)	1.06 (27)	23.54 (598)
Average snowfall inches (cm)	0.4 (1.0)	1.2 (3.0)	0.2 (0.51)	0.4 (1.0)	0.0 (0.0)	0.0 (0.0)	0.0 (0.0)	0.0 (0.0)	0.0 (0.0)	0.0 (0.0)	0.5 (1.3)	0.8 (2.0)	3.5 (8.9)
Average precipitation days (≥ 0.01 in)	2.8	3.2	3.5	3.2	5.8	5.0	3.6	3.7	4.1	4.3	2.6	2.8	44.6
Average snowy days (≥ 0.1 in)	0.3	0.5	0.1	0.2	0.0	0.0	0.0	0.0	0.0	0.0	0.3	0.4	1.8
Source: NOAA

== Demographics ==
Historical population
Census	Pop.	Note	%±
1910	1,126		—
1920	1,000		−11.2%
1930	1,632		63.2%
1940	2,029		24.3%
1950	3,163		55.9%
1960	2,788		−11.9%
1970	2,404		−13.8%
1980	2,284		−5.0%
1990	1,913		−16.2%
2000	1,611		−15.8%
2010	1,508		−6.4%
2020	1,332		−11.7%
U.S. Decennial Census

=== 2020 census ===
As of the 2020 census, Rotan had 1,332 people, 591 households, and 364 families. The median age was 48.0 years; 20.6% of the residents were under 18 and 24.8% were 65 or older. The female/male ratio was 1:0.945overall and 1:0.877 for those 8 and over.

None of the residents lived in urban areas, while 100.0% lived in rural areas.

Of the 591 households, 27.1% had children under 18 living in them, 42.3% were married-couple households, 20.1% were households with a male householder and no spouse or partner present, and 33.2% were households with a female householder and no spouse or partner present. About 33.4% of all households were made up of individuals, and 18.1% had someone living alone who was 65 or older.

The city had 748 housing units, of which 21.0% were vacant. The homeowner vacancy rate was 3.6% and the rental vacancy rate was 10.7%.

Racial composition as of the 2020 census
Race	Number	Percentage
White	876	65.8%
Black or African American	85	6.4%
American Indian and Alaska Native	23	1.7%
Asian	10	0.8%
Native Hawaiian and other Pacific Islander	1	0.1%
Some other race	164	12.3%
Two or more races	173	13.0%
Hispanic or Latino (of any race)	545	40.9%

=== 2000 census ===
As of the 2000 census, 1,611 people, 665 households, and 442 families resided in the city. The population density was 791.3 inhabitants per square mile (305.5/km^{2}). The 841 housing units averaged 413.1 per square mile (159.2/km^{2}). The racial makeup of the city was 72.44% White, 5.59% African American, 0.25% Native American, 0.19% Asian, 19.49% from other races, and 2.05% from two or more races. Hispanics or Latinos of any race were 32.90% of the population.

Of the 665 households, 28.0% had children under 18 living with them, 51.6% were married couples living together, 11.9% had a female householder with no husband present, and 33.5% were not families; 32.3% of all households were made up of individuals, and 21.4% had someone living alone who was 65 or older. The average household size was 2.35, and the average family size was 2.95.

In the city, the age distribution was 24.6% under 18, 8.0% from 18 to 24, 22.2% from 25 to 44, 21.7% from 45 to 64, and 23.5% who were 65 or older. The median age was 41 years. For every 100 females, there were 87.3 males. For every 100 females 18 and over, there were 82.2 males.

The median income in the city for a household was $21,638 and for a family was $29,038. Males had a median income of $25,688 versus $17,045 for females. The per capita income for the city was $13,097. About 16.6% of families and 22.6% of the population were below the poverty line, including 39.0% of those under 18 and 11.9% of those 65 or over.

== Education ==
The city is served by the Rotan Independent School District.

== Notable people ==
- Sammy Baugh, quarterback for the Washington Redskins, had a ranch in Rotan.
- Ella Hudson Day, composer and ragtime musician, was one of the earliest residents.
