= Hamlin High School =

Coordinates: 32.8788°N 100.1329°W

Hamlin Collegiate High School

Location
- 450 SW Ave F Hamlin, Texas 79520-4698; United States

Information
- School type: Public High School
- School district: Hamlin Independent School District
- Superintendent: Randy Burks
- Principal: Matt Pond (Active June 15, 2017)
- Grades: 7–12
- Enrollment: 183 (2023–2024)
- Colors: Green and white
- Athletics conference: UIL Class 1A
- Mascot: Pied Pipers/Lady Pipers
- Yearbook: The Piper
- Website: Hamlin High School

Hamlin Collegiate High School is a public high school located in Hamlin, Texas, United States and is part of the Hamlin Collegiate ISD located in far northwest Jones County. Partnering with Collegiate Edu-Nation in early 2019, Hamlin CISD was transformed into a collegiate district where students can receive industry certifications, associate's degrees, and innovative bachelor’s degrees all from Hamlin, at no cost to the students.

== Athletics ==
The Hamlin Pied Pipers compete in cross-country, football, basketball, golf, track, softball, and baseball.

=== State titles ===
- Girls' cross-country: 2012 (1A)
- Boys' track: 1973 (2A), 1974 (2A)
- Girls' track: 1980 (1A), 1985 (2A), 1986 (2A), 2005 (1A)

=== State finalist ===
- Football: 2019 (2A/D2)
