= Hamlin, Texas =

- City
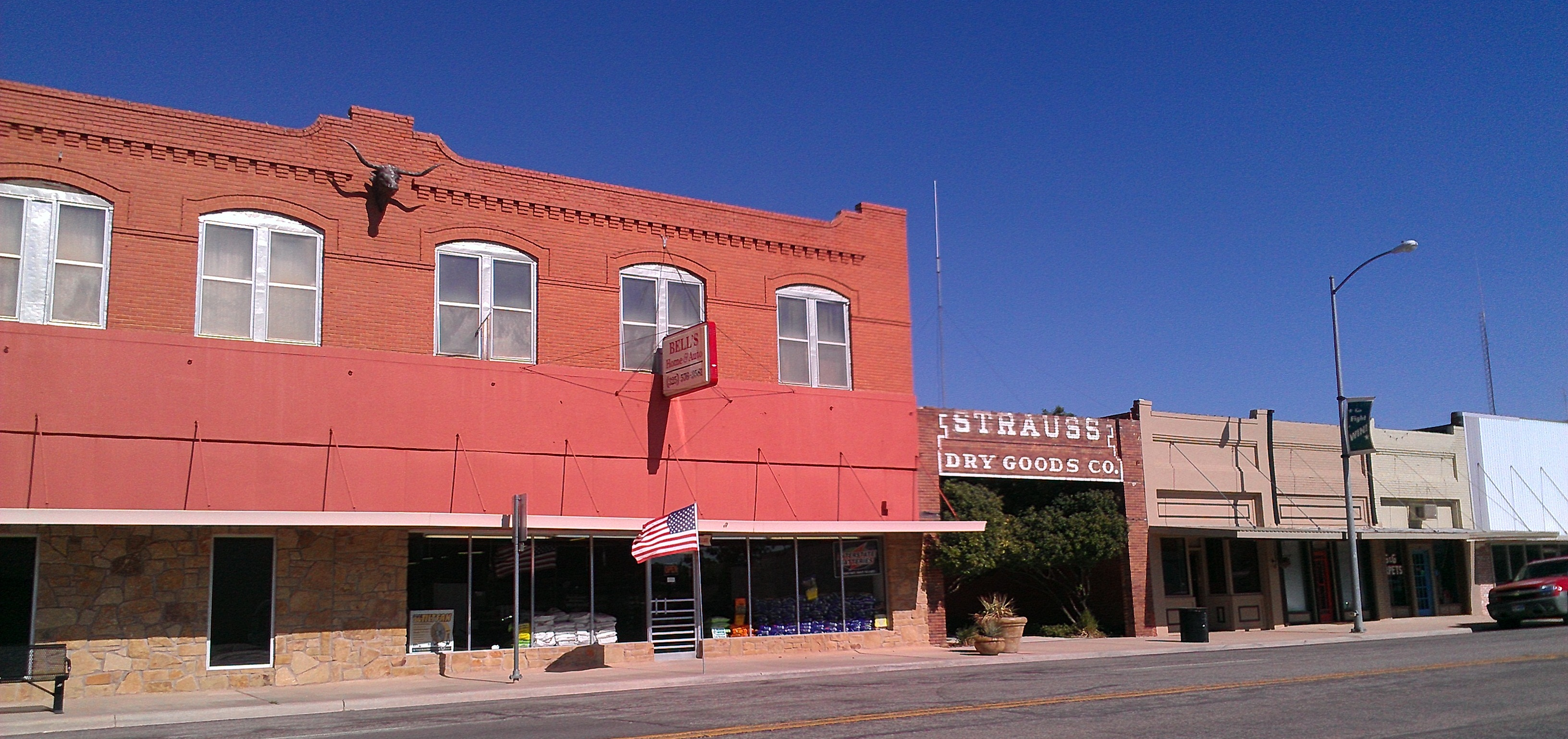
- Strauss Dry Goods Co. storefront, which has been converted into a public park, and adjoining building

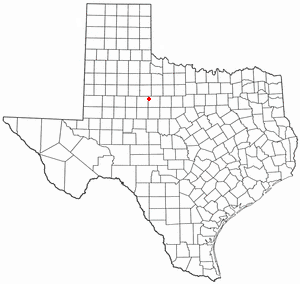
- Location of Hamlin, Texas

- Coordinates: 32°53′02″N 100°07′31″W
- Country: United States
- State: Texas
- Counties: Jones, Fisher
- Year established: 1907

Area
  - Total: 5.30 sq mi (13.72 km^{2})
  - Land: 5.29 sq mi (13.69 km^{2})
  - Water: 0.012 sq mi (0.03 km^{2})
- Elevation: 1,726 ft (526 m)

Population (2020)
  - Total: 1,831
  - Density: 346.4/sq mi (133.7/km^{2})
- Time zone: UTC-6 (Central (CST))
  - Summer (DST): UTC-5 (CDT)
- ZIP code: 79520
- Area code: 325
- FIPS code: 48-31964
- GNIS feature ID: 2410695
- Website: https://www.hamlintx.city/

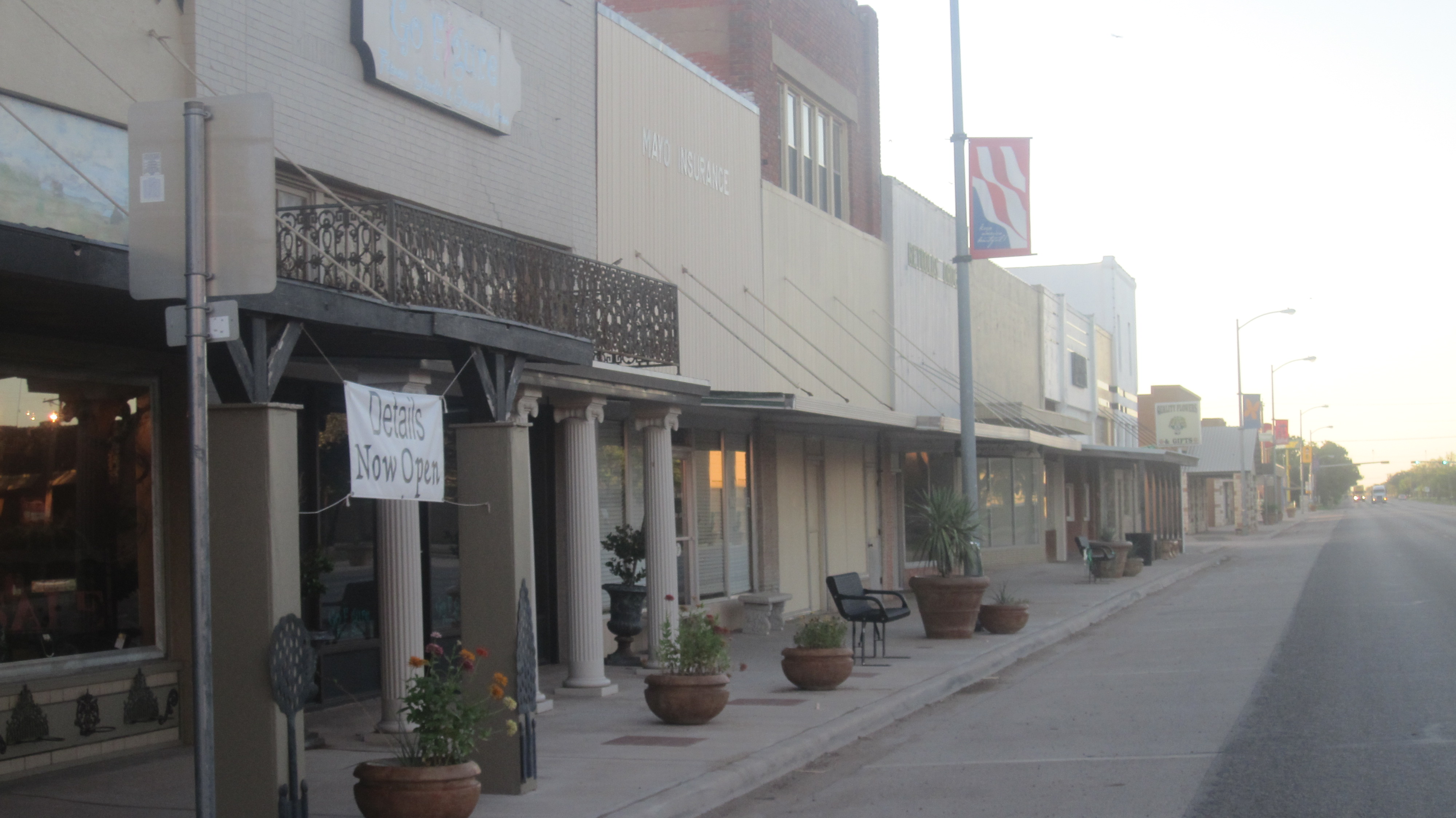
Downtown Hamlin near sunset

Hamlin is a city in Jones and Fisher Counties in the U.S. state of Texas. Its population was 1,831 at the 2020 census. The Jones County portion of Hamlin is part of the Abilene, Texas metropolitan area.

== History ==
The city was named for W. H. Hamlin, a railroad official of the Kansas City, Mexico and Orient Railway. The Orient reached Hamlin in 1906 and was followed by the Texas Central Railroad within a few years and by the Abilene and Southern Railroad in 1910. The arrival of the railroad was announced in 1902, and the first train arrived in 1906. The county's first gypsum plant was constructed 6 miles (10 km) outside of Hamlin in 1903. Business boomed with the rail service, and the town included gins, a cottonseed oil mill, and a number of other businesses. Oil was discovered in 1928, which also contributed to the economy. The Hamlin Herald was first published in 1906 and is still in print. Hamlin later gained its first and only hospital, Hamlin Memorial Hospital, in 1948; it is operated by Hamlin Hospital District and owns Hamlin Medical Clinic.

== Geography ==
Hamlin is located in northwestern Jones County. The city limits extend west into Fisher County, although no people lived in this portion as of 2010. According to the United States Census Bureau, the city has a total area of 5.3 square miles (13.7 km^{2}), of which 0.01 sq mi (0.03 km^{2}), or 0.20%, is covered by water.

U.S. Route 83 passes through the center of Hamlin as Central Avenue, leading north 18 miles (29 km) to Aspermont and southeast 17 miles (27 km) to Anson, the Jones County seat. Abilene is 42 miles (68 km) to the southeast. Texas State Highway 92 crosses Hamlin as Lake Drive, leading east 20 miles (32 km) to Stamford and west 20 miles to Rotan.

== Demographics ==
Historical population
Census	Pop.	Note	%±
1910	1,978		—
1920	1,633		−17.4%
1930	2,828		73.2%
1940	2,406		−14.9%
1950	3,569		48.3%
1960	3,791		6.2%
1970	3,325		−12.3%
1980	3,248		−2.3%
1990	2,791		−14.1%
2000	2,248		−19.5%
2010	2,124		−5.5%
2020	1,831		−13.8%
U.S. Decennial Census

=== 2020 census ===
As of the 2020 census, 1,831 people, 737 households, and 528 families lived in the city. The median age was 40.4 years; 24.2% of residents were under 18 and 20.0% were 65 or older. For every 100 females, there were 95.2 males, and for every 100 females 18 and over, there were 94.7 males 18 and over.

Of the 737 households, 32.2% had children under 18 living in them, 49.5% were married-couple households, 19.5% were households with a male householder and no spouse or partner present, and 24.7% were households with a female householder and no spouse or partner present. About 28.5% of all households were made up of individuals, and 14.1% had someone living alone who was 65 or older.

The city had 1,025 housing units, of which 28.1% were vacant. The homeowner vacancy rate was 2.8% and the rental vacancy rate was 19.3%.

None of residents lived in urban areas, while 100.0% lived in rural areas.

Hamlin racial composition (NH = Non-Hispanic) (Note: Note: the US Census treats Hispanic/Latino as an ethnic category. This table excludes Latinos from the racial categories and assigns them to a separate category. Hispanics/Latinos can be of any race.)
Race	Number	Percentage
White (NH)	1,054	57.56%
Black or African American (NH)	109	5.95%
Native American or Alaska Native (NH)	9	0.49%
Asian (NH)	15	0.82%
Some other race (NH)	6	0.33%
Multiracial (NH)	48	2.62%
Hispanic or Latino	590	32.22%
Total	1,831	

=== 2000 census ===
As of the 2000 census, 2,248 people, 924 households, and 623 families resided in the city. The population density was 422.4 inhabitants per square mile (163.1/km^{2}). The 1,090 housing units averaged 204.8 units per square mile (79.1 units/km^{2}). The racial makeup of the city was 79.58% White, 6.23% African American, 0.22% Native American, 0.71% Asian, 0.04% Pacific Islander, 11.48% from other races, and 1.73% from two or more races. Hispanics or Latinos of any race were 20.69% of the population.

Of the 924 households, 29.5% had children under 18 living with them, 52.7% were married couples living together, 10.8% had a female householder with no husband present, and 32.5% were not families. About 31.6% of all households were made up of individuals, and 18.6% had someone living alone who was 65 or older. The average household size was 2.39, and the average family size was 3.00.

In the city, the population was distributed as 25.7% under 18, 6.8% from 18 to 24, 22.9% from 25 to 44, 22.7% from 45 to 64, and 21.9% who were 65 or older. The median age was 41 years. For every 100 females, there were 87.3 males. For every 100 females 18 and over, there were 78.9 males.

The median income in the city for a household was $25,873 and for a family was $33,667. Males had a median income of $25,887 versus $16,350 for females. The per capita income for the city was $13,308. About 13.7% of families and 20.7% of the population were below the poverty line, including 27.6% of those under 18 and 21.2% of those 65 or over.

== Education ==
The city is served by the Hamlin Independent School District and is home to the Hamlin High School Pied Pipers.

== Climate ==
According to the Köppen climate classification, Hamlin has a semiarid climate, BSk on climate maps.
