= Fisher County, Texas =

County in Texas, United States

- County
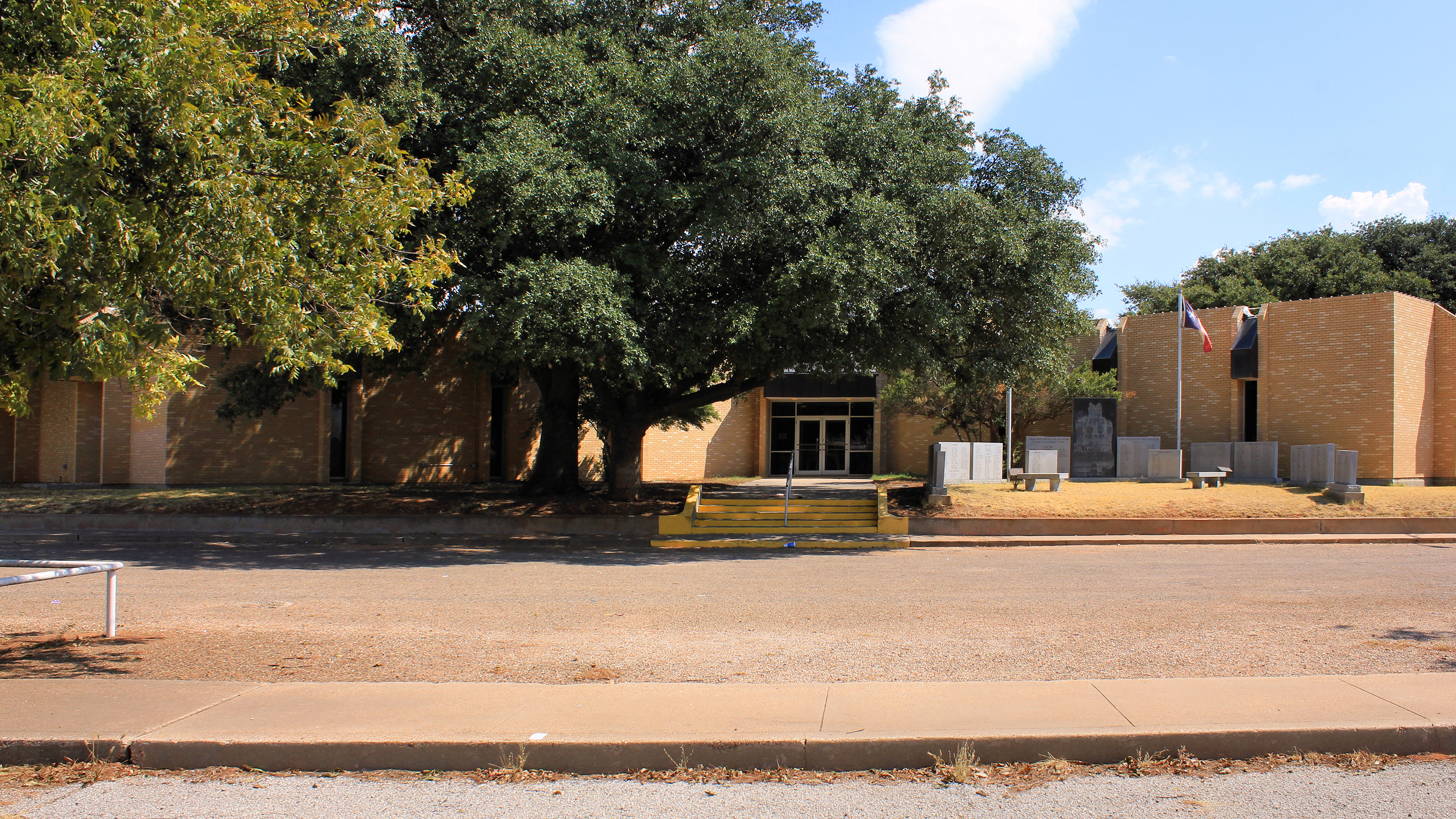
- The Fisher County Courthouse

- Location within the U.S. state of Texas
- Coordinates: 32°44′N 100°24′W
- Country: United States
- State: Texas
- Founded: 1886
- Named for: Samuel Rhoads Fisher
- Seat: Roby
- Largest city: Rotan

Area
  - Total: 902 sq mi (2,340 km^{2})
  - Land: 899 sq mi (2,330 km^{2})
  - Water: 2.8 sq mi (7.3 km^{2}) 0.3%

Population (2020)
  - Total: 3,672
  - Estimate (2025): 3,692 ▲
  - Density: 4.08/sq mi (1.58/km^{2})
- Time zone: UTC−6 (Central)
  - Summer (DST): UTC−5 (CDT)
- Congressional district: 19th
- Website: www.fishercounty.org

Fisher County is a county located in the U.S. state of Texas. As of the 2020 census, its population was 3,672. The county seat is Roby. The county was created in 1876 and later organized in 1886. It is named for Samuel Rhoads Fisher, a signer of the Texas Declaration of Independence and a secretary of the navy of the Republic of Texas. Fisher County was one of 30 prohibition, or entirely dry, counties in Texas, but is now a fully wet county.

== History ==
- 10000 BC - Paleo-Indians were the first inhabitants. Later Native American inhabitants include the Pawnee, Wichita and Waco, Lipan Apache, Kiowa, and Comanche.
- 1876 - The Texas legislature formed Fisher County from Bexar districts. The new county was named after Samuel Rhoads Fisher.
- 1880 - The census reported 136 inhabitants.
- 1881 - The Texas and Pacific Railway routed an east–west branch through Eskota.
- 1885 - The town of Fisher was registered. Swedish immigrants founded the community of Swedonia.
- 1886 - The town of North Roby was registered. Roby eventually won the county seat election over Fisher, but one of the voters, a Mr. Bill Purp, was later discovered to have been actually a dog whose owner lived near Roby.
- 1920 - Fisher County was among Texas leaders in wheat production.
- 1926 - Cotton became king, as 48,000 bales were ginned in the county.
- 1928 - Oil was discovered in the county.
- 1970 - The county's average annual farm income was evenly divided between livestock and crops.

== Geography ==
According to the U.S. Census Bureau, the county has a total area of 902 square miles (2,340 km^{2}), of which 2.8 square miles (7.3 km^{2}) (0.3%) are covered by water.

=== Major highways ===
- U.S. Highway 83
- U.S. Highway 180
- State Highway 70
- State Highway 92

=== Adjacent counties ===
- Stonewall County (north)
- Jones County (east)
- Taylor County (southeast)
- Nolan County (south)
- Mitchell County (southwest)
- Scurry County (west)
- Kent County (northwest)

== Demographics ==
Historical population
Census	Pop.	Note	%±
1880	136		—
1890	2,996		2,102.9%
1900	2,708		−9.6%
1910	12,596		365.1%
1920	11,009		−12.6%
1930	13,563		23.2%
1940	12,932		−4.7%
1950	11,023		−14.8%
1960	7,865		−28.6%
1970	6,344		−19.3%
1980	5,891		−7.1%
1990	4,842		−17.8%
2000	4,344		−10.3%
2010	3,974		−8.5%
2020	3,672		−7.6%
2025 (est.)	3,692	▲	0.5%
U.S. Decennial Census; 1850–2010 2010 2020

=== Racial and ethnic composition ===
Fisher County, Texas – Racial and ethnic composition Note: the US Census treats Hispanic/Latino as an ethnic category. This table excludes Latinos from the racial categories and assigns them to a separate category. Hispanics/Latinos may be of any race.
Race / Ethnicity (NH = Non-Hispanic)	Pop 2000	Pop 2010	Pop 2020	% 2000	% 2010	% 2020
White alone (NH)	3,250	2,797	2,496	74.82%	70.38%	67.97%
Black or African American alone (NH)	110	124	92	2.53%	3.12%	2.51%
Native American or Alaska Native alone (NH)	15	12	15	0.35%	0.30%	0.41%
Asian alone (NH)	6	7	13	0.14%	0.18%	0.35%
Pacific Islander alone (NH)	0	0	2	0.00%	0.00%	0.05%
Other race alone (NH)	5	7	11	0.12%	0.18%	0.30%
Mixed or multiracial (NH)	30	28	70	0.69%	0.70%	1.91%
Hispanic or Latino (any race)	928	999	973	21.36%	25.14%	26.50%
Total	4,344	3,974	3,672	100.00%	100.00%	100.00%

=== 2020 census ===
As of the 2020 census, the county had a population of 3,672. The median age was 47.0 years; 22.1% of the residents were under 18 and 24.5% were 65 or older. The female/male ratio was 1:0.978 overall and 1:0.944 for those 18 and over.

The racial makeup of the county was 79.5% White, 2.9% Black or African American, 0.8% American Indian and Alaska Native, 0.4% Asian, 0.1% Native Hawaiian and Pacific Islander, 6.9% from some other race, and 9.4% from two or more races. Hispanic or Latino residents of any race comprised 26.5% of the population.

Almost none of the residents lived in urban areas, while nearly 100.0% lived in rural areas.

Of the 1,555 households in the county, 29.0% had children under 18 living in them, 50.9% were married-couple households, 20.5% were households with a male householder and no spouse or partner present, and 24.8% were households with a female householder and no spouse or partner present. About 29.0% of all households were made up of individuals, and 15.9% had someone living alone who was 65 or older.

The city had 2,109 housing units, of which 26.3% were vacant. Among occupied housing units, 77.3% were owner-occupied and 22.7% were renter-occupied. The homeowner vacancy rate was 2.5% and the rental vacancy rate was 12.8%.

=== 2000 census ===
As of the 2000 census, 4,344 people, 1,785 households, and 1,244 families resided in the county. The population density was five people per square mile (1.9 people/km^{2}). The 2,277 housing units averaged two units per square mile (0.77 units/km^{2}). The racial makeup of the county was 83.75% White, 2.76% Black or African American, 0.37% Native American, 0.14% Asian, 11.58% from other races, and 1.40% from two or more races. About 21.36% of the population were Hispanic or Latino of any race.

Of the 1,785 households, 27.6% had children under 18 living with them, 58.9% were married couples living together, 8.1% had a female householder with no husband present, and 30.3% were not families. About 28.3% of all households were made up of individuals, and 17.8% had someone living alone who was 65 or older. The average household size was 2.39 and the average family size was 2.93.

In the county, the age distribution was 23.90% under the age of 18, 6.30% from 18 to 24, 23.00% from 25 to 44, 24.10% from 45 to 64, and 22.70% who were 65 years of age or older. The median age was 43 years. For every 100 females, there were 92.90 males. For every 100 females age 18 and over, there were 89.80 males.

The median income for a household in the county was $27,659, and for a family was $34,907. Males had a median income of $25,071 versus $20,536 for females. The per capita income for the county was $15,120. About 13.5% of families and 17.5% of the population were below the poverty line, including 27.4% of those under 18 and 10.5% of those 65 or over.

== Communities ==
=== Cities ===
- Hamlin (mostly in Jones County)
- Roby (county seat)
- Rotan

=== Census-designated places ===
- McCaulley
- Sylvester

=== Unincorporated communities ===
- Hobbs
- Longworth (birthplace of Poker Hall of Fame inductee Doyle Brunson)

=== Ghost towns ===
- North Roby
- Royston

== Politics ==
Fisher County was one of the last rural yellow-dog counties in Texas to switch from consistently voting for Democratic candidates to favoring Republican candidates. From 1921 to 1925, the Democrat Richard M. Chitwood of Sweetwater represented Fisher County in the state house. He left his post to become the first business manager of Texas Tech University, but died the next year.

Fisher County is located within District 69 of the Texas House of Representatives. Fisher County is located within District 28 of the Texas Senate.

United States presidential election results for Fisher County, Texas
Year	Republican		Democratic		Third party(ies)	
Year	No.	%	No.	%	No.	%
1912	21	3.48%	572	94.70%	11	1.82%
1916	46	3.74%	950	77.17%	235	19.09%
1920	152	15.29%	743	74.75%	99	9.96%
1924	302	15.00%	1,653	82.12%	58	2.88%
1928	1,259	60.07%	837	39.93%	0	0.00%
1932	105	6.97%	1,395	92.63%	6	0.40%
1936	155	6.95%	2,068	92.78%	6	0.27%
1940	199	8.07%	2,260	91.61%	8	0.32%
1944	154	6.60%	2,041	87.52%	137	5.87%
1948	149	6.52%	2,063	90.28%	73	3.19%
1952	952	40.36%	1,405	59.56%	2	0.08%
1956	673	28.72%	1,664	71.02%	6	0.26%
1960	679	25.57%	1,966	74.05%	10	0.38%
1964	454	17.69%	2,108	82.12%	5	0.19%
1968	555	23.27%	1,560	65.41%	270	11.32%
1972	1,207	56.22%	933	43.46%	7	0.33%
1976	573	22.24%	1,993	77.37%	10	0.39%
1980	838	34.39%	1,564	64.18%	35	1.44%
1984	965	40.94%	1,384	58.72%	8	0.34%
1988	721	32.19%	1,516	67.68%	3	0.13%
1992	539	24.22%	1,242	55.82%	444	19.96%
1996	537	29.04%	1,142	61.76%	170	9.19%
2000	968	51.71%	884	47.22%	20	1.07%
2004	1,161	60.37%	758	39.42%	4	0.21%
2008	1,083	60.71%	687	38.51%	14	0.78%
2012	1,094	67.16%	512	31.43%	23	1.41%
2016	1,265	73.16%	403	23.31%	61	3.53%
2020	1,448	79.30%	352	19.28%	26	1.42%
2024	1,487	81.26%	330	18.03%	13	0.71%

United States Senate election results for Fisher County, Texas1
Year	Republican		Democratic		Third party(ies)	
Year	No.	%	No.	%	No.	%
2024	1,420	78.37%	358	19.76%	34	1.88%

United States Senate election results for Fisher County, Texas2
Year	Republican		Democratic		Third party(ies)	
Year	No.	%	No.	%	No.	%
2020	1,418	78.60%	351	19.46%	35	1.94%

Texas Gubernatorial election results for Fisher County
Year	Republican		Democratic		Third party(ies)	
Year	No.	%	No.	%	No.	%
2022	1,172	83.65%	210	14.99%	19	1.36%

== Education ==
School districts include:

- Hamlin Independent School District
- Hermleigh Independent School District
- Roby Consolidated Independent School District
- Roscoe Collegiate Independent School District
- Rotan Independent School District
- Sweetwater Independent School District
- Trent Independent School District

The Texas Legislature designated the county as being in the Western Texas College District.

== See also ==
- Double Mountain Fork Brazos River
- Clear Fork Brazos River
- Salt Fork Brazos River
- National Register of Historic Places listings in Fisher County, Texas
- Recorded Texas Historic Landmarks in Fisher County
