= Roby, Texas =

- City
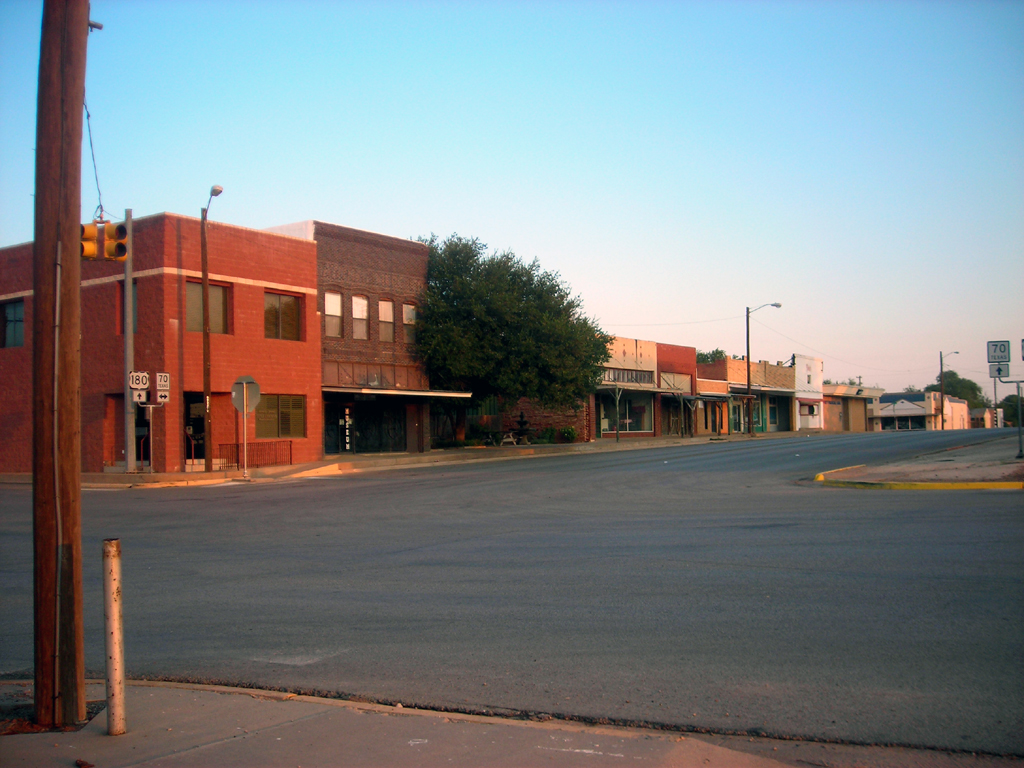
- Downtown Roby

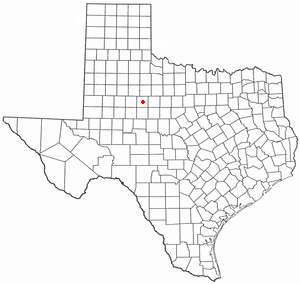
- Location of Roby, Texas

- Coordinates: 32°44′51″N 100°22′42″W
- Country: United States
- State: Texas
- County: Fisher

Area
  - Total: 0.72 sq mi (1.86 km^{2})
  - Land: 0.72 sq mi (1.86 km^{2})
  - Water: 0 sq mi (0.00 km^{2})
- Elevation: 1,965 ft (599 m)

Population (2020)
  - Total: 591
  - Density: 823/sq mi (318/km^{2})
- Time zone: UTC-6 (Central (CST))
  - Summer (DST): UTC-5 (CDT)
- ZIP code: 79543
- Area code: 325
- FIPS code: 48-62612
- GNIS feature ID: 2410974

Roby is a city in and the county seat of Fisher County, Texas, United States. The population was 591 at the 2020 census.

== History ==
In 1885, shortly after Fisher County was organized, a dispute arose between business partners from Mississippi and a town called Fisher. Both wanted their land to host the courthouse. The partners were M.L. and D.C. Roby, and the town of Fisher is now called North Roby.

In 1886, construction was begun on the new courthouse and a school and post office opened. The community had 13 houses by that summer. In 1890, the population was estimated to be 300 people and the town had a hotel, two general stores, Baptist and Methodist churches, a restaurant, and a weekly newspaper, the Fisher County Call.

Roby had no jail until 1892, when one was constructed out of stone. A new jail was built in 1926 out of brick, and remained in use until 2016. In 2016, a new jail was built and the brick jailhouse was declared a historic landmark.

It has had three different courthouses during its existence, unlike many Texas county seats, which have preserved and restored original courthouses. The most recent courthouse was built in the early 1970s.

In 1898, the first bank was chartered and the Roby school district was formed. The area covered by the school district grew slowly over the years as it absorbed rural schools in the vicinity, including those of Longworth and McCaulley.

By 1900, the population had grown to 712 residents. By 1914, it had Baptist, Methodist, Presbyterian, and Nazarene churches. Telephone service was also established in 1914.

Roby received its first railroad in 1907 (the Texas Central), and in 1915, the Roby and Northern laid 4.4 miles of track to connect Roby proper with North Roby. The line was scrapped during World War II and its rails went to the war effort.

Roby incorporated in 1915, and its population grew to 801 in 1930 and 904 in 1940. The population peaked in 1950 with 1,040 people calling Roby and North Roby home, and 60 businesses. The city was plagued by insufficient water throughout its life and finally in 1953 during a long period of drought, water from Oak Creek Lake at Blackwell was piped in. By 1970, the population had fallen below 800 with 22 businesses in operation. It further declined to 616 in 1990 before rebounding to 673 in 2000, and as of the 2010 Census, the population had fallen to 643.

== Geography ==
According to the United States Census Bureau, the city has a total area of 0.7 square miles (1.8 km^{2}), all land. Roby is surrounded by wide cotton fields.

=== Climate ===
Climate data for Roby, Texas
Month	Jan	Feb	Mar	Apr	May	Jun	Jul	Aug	Sep	Oct	Nov	Dec	Year
Mean daily maximum °C (°F)	14 (58)	17 (62)	22 (71)	26 (78)	29 (85)	33 (92)	35 (95)	35 (95)	32 (89)	26 (78)	19 (67)	14 (58)	25 (77)
Mean daily minimum °C (°F)	−1 (30)	−1 (31)	4 (39)	9 (49)	14 (57)	18 (65)	20 (68)	20 (68)	17 (62)	10 (50)	4 (40)	−1 (31)	9 (49)
Average precipitation mm (inches)	20 (0.8)	25 (1)	25 (1)	53 (2.1)	81 (3.2)	69 (2.7)	46 (1.8)	61 (2.4)	66 (2.6)	58 (2.3)	30 (1.2)	25 (1)	560 (22.1)
Average snowfall cm (inches)	3.3 (1.3)	0.76 (0.3)	1.3 (0.5)	0.0 (0.0)	0.0 (0.0)	0.0 (0.0)	0.0 (0.0)	0.0 (0.0)	0.0 (0.0)	0.0 (0.0)	0.76 (0.3)	1.8 (0.7)	7.92 (3.1)
Average precipitation days	2	3	2	4	5	4	3	4	4	4	3	2	40
Source: Weatherbase

== Demographics ==
Historical population
Census	Pop.	Note	%±
1920	635		—
1930	801		26.1%
1940	904		12.9%
1950	1,051		16.3%
1960	913		−13.1%
1970	784		−14.1%
1980	814		3.8%
1990	616		−24.3%
2000	673		9.3%
2010	643		−4.5%
2020	591		−8.1%
U.S. Decennial Census

=== 2020 census ===
As of the 2020 census, Roby had a population of 591, 244 households, and 216 families. The median age was 36.0 years; 28.8% of residents were under the age of 18 and 18.3% were 65 years of age or older. For every 100 females there were 88.2 males, and for every 100 females age 18 and over there were 76.2 males age 18 and over.

Of the 244 households in Roby, 38.9% had children under the age of 18 living in them. 41.8% were married-couple households, 18.4% were households with a male householder and no spouse or partner present, and 34.0% were households with a female householder and no spouse or partner present. About 31.1% of households were made up of individuals and 18.0% had someone living alone who was 65 years of age or older.

There were 305 housing units, of which 20.0% were vacant. The homeowner vacancy rate was 3.3% and the rental vacancy rate was 20.5%.

0.0% of residents lived in urban areas while 100.0% lived in rural areas.

Racial composition as of the 2020 census
Race	Number	Percent
White	491	83.1%
Black or African American	12	2.0%
American Indian and Alaska Native	0	0.0%
Asian	0	0.0%
Native Hawaiian and Other Pacific Islander	0	0.0%
Some other race	42	7.1%
Two or more races	46	7.8%
Hispanic or Latino (of any race)	186	31.5%

=== 2000 census ===
As of the census of 2000, 673 people, 264 households, and 175 families resided in the city. The population density was 936.1 inhabitants per square mile (361.4/km^{2}). The 312 housing units averaged 434.0 per square mile (167.3/km^{2}). The racial makeup of the city was 86.18% White, 3.27% African American, 0.45% Native American, 8.32% from other races, and 1.78% from two or more races. Hispanics or Latinos of any race were 22.14% of the population.

Of the 264 households, 31.1% had children under 18 living with them, 53.4% were married couples living together, 10.2% had a female householder with no husband present, and 33.7% were not families. About 31.1% of all households were made up of individuals, and 20.8% had someone living alone who was 65 or older. The average household size was 2.45, and the average family size was 3.13.

In the city, the age distribution was 27.8% under 18, 6.2% from 18 to 24, 25.1% from 25 to 44, 20.2% from 45 to 64, and 20.7% who were 65 or older. The median age was 37 years. For every 100 females, there were 80.4 males. For every 100 females 18 and over, there were 78.0 males.

The median income for a household in the city was $27,031, and for a family was $34,632. Males had a median income of $27,500 versus $19,286 for females. The per capita income for the city was $13,926. About 14.8% of families and 15.9% of the population were below the poverty line, including 18.9% of those under age 18 and 14.7% of those age 65 or over.

== The Roby 42 ==
Forty-two residents of Roby put $10 each in a lottery pool in 1996 and won the $46,000,000 jackpot on Thanksgiving of that year, making 6–7% percent of the population millionaires instantly (before taxes).

== Education ==
The City of Roby is served by the Roby Consolidated Independent School District and is home to the Roby High School Lions.
