= U.S. Route 83 in Texas =

Highway in Texas

U.S. Highway 83
- Texas Vietnam Veterans Memorial Highway
- US 83 highlighted in red

Route information
- Maintained by TxDOT
- Length: 906.5 mi (1,458.9 km)
- Existed: 1932–present

Major junctions
- South end: Mexican border in Brownsville
- I-69E / US 77 from Brownsville to Harlingen; I-2 from Harlingen to La Joya; I-69C / US 281 in Pharr; I-35 in Laredo; I-69W / US 59 in Laredo; I-10 / US 377 in Junction; I-20 / US 84 / US 277 in Abilene; I-40 in Shamrock
- North end: US 83 at the Oklahoma state line near Perryton

Location
- Country: United States
- State: Texas
- Counties: Cameron, Hidalgo, Starr, Zapata, Webb, Dimmit, Zavala, Uvalde, Real, Kerr, Edwards, Kimble, Menard, Concho, Runnels, Taylor, Jones, Fisher, Stonewall, King, Cottle, Childress, Collingsworth, Wheeler, Hemphill, Lipscomb, Ochiltree

Highway system
- United States Numbered Highway System; List; Special; Divided; Highways in Texas; Interstate; US; State; Former; Toll; Loops; Spurs; FM/RM; Park; Rec
← SH 82	→ SH 83

U.S. Highway 83 (US 83), dedicated as the Texas Vietnam Veterans Memorial Highway, is a U.S. Highway in the U.S. state of Texas that begins at I-69E/US 77 in Brownsville and follows the Rio Grande to Laredo, then heads north through Abilene to the Oklahoma state line north of Perryton, the seat of Ochiltree County.

In the Lower Rio Grande Valley, US 83 is a freeway that is at or close to interstate standards from Brownsville to Peñitas. In May 2013, the Texas Department of Transportation applied to the American Association of State Highway and Transportation Officials to designate this 48-mile (77 km) section as I-2. After the Special Committee on Route Numbering initially disapproved the application, the American Association of State Highway and Transportation Officials Board of Directors approved the I-2 designation, conditional on the concurrence of the Federal Highway Administration. On May 29, 2013, the segment of US 83 was approved as an I-69 connector using the I-2 designation extending approximately 46 miles (74 km) from Harlingen to west of Mission.

At a length of 906.5 mi (1,458.9 km), it is the longest numbered highway in Texas, besting the east west I-10, which runs 880 miles. It is also the longest stretch of a single US Highway within a single US state.

== Route description ==
US 83's southern terminus is at a concurrency with I-69E/US 77 on the south side of Brownsville at the Brownsville – Veterans Port of Entry at the US/Mexico border. It remains co-signed with I-69E/US 77 until Harlingen, where I-69E/US 77 makes a sharp turn northward and US 83 maintains a westerly route to McAllen, concurrent with I-2 until Peñitas. From there, the highway roughly parallels the Rio Grande until Laredo where it makes a northwesterly turn toward Carrizo Springs, the seat of Dimmit County. The speed limit on US 83 is briefly 75 mph through Dimmit County.

Merging with I-35 just south of downtown, US 83 remains co-signed with the interstate until an exit at Botines. From there, it continues northward, intersecting with I-10 just south of Junction. US 83 is co-signed with I-10 for approximately 8 miles (13 km), turning northward and leaving I-10 at the Kimble County Airport.

After continuing northward through several rural western Texas towns, US 83 merges with US 84 east of Tuscola, where it makes a sharp turn back to the north.

US 83/84 remains a co-signed route until Abilene. Within the city, the routes run along the Winters Freeway, named for Mayor Jesse Winters, who was a strong advocate for the freeway's construction. In the south of the city, there is an interchange for Bus. US 83 and the Loop 322 freeway. On the west side of the city, US 277 merges onto the freeway; US 84 then departs to the northwest while US 83 remains northbound. Next there is a full-access interchange with I-20, followed by another interchange with Bus. US 83. Leaving the city, the freeway ends, dropping to a divided highway.

US 83/277 remains a co-signed route until approximately 2 miles (3.2 km) north of Anson, where US 277 turns northeast, and US 83, northwest.

After merging with US 380 in Aspermont and briefly sharing a route, US 83 continues northward, merging with US 62 in Paducah. US 83/62 continues as a co-signed route until approximately 15 miles (24 km) south of Wellington, where US 62 makes a sharp turn eastward, leaving US 83 to continue northward, where it crosses into Oklahoma approximately 6 miles (9.7 km) north of Perryton.

== Future ==
TxDOT is planning to upgrade multiple portions of the US 83 corridor to interstate highway standards. Long-term plans call for I-2 to be extended along the US 83 corridor to Laredo, where it will terminate at I-69W. On March 15, 2022, a bill was signed by President Joe Biden that added the extension of I-27 north to Raton, New Mexico, and south to Laredo to the Interstate Highway System. The extension would utilize the US 83 corridor between Carrizo Springs and Laredo. Part of the I-14 project also includes upgrading US 83 to interstate highway standards between I-10 in Junction and US 87 (Future I-14N) in Eden. The routing will also include an interchange with US 190 (Future I-14S) in Menard.

== Major intersections ==
County	Location	mi	km	Destinations	Notes
Cameron	Brownsville	0.0	0.0	Veterans International Bridge at Los Tomates over the Rio Grande south end of US 77 overlap	
Cameron	Brownsville	0.9	1.4	University Boulevard / East Avenue - UT-Brownsville, Texas Southmost College	at-grade intersection
Cameron	overlap; see I-69E				
Cameron	Harlingen	26.9	43.3	I-69E north / US 77 north – Raymondville, Corpus Christi, Airport	north end of I-69E / US 77 overlap; east end of I-2 overlap; exit 26B on I-69E; exit 176 on I-2
overlap; see I-2
Hidalgo	Peñitas	74.5	119.9	Bus. US 83 east – Bentsen Rio Grande Valley State Park, Mission, McAllen I-2 ends	at-grade intersection; current western end of I-2
Hidalgo	Peñitas	75.0	120.7	FM 1427 south – Abram	
Hidalgo	La Joya	77.4	124.6	FM 2521 south (Leo Avenue)	
Hidalgo		77.9	125.4	FM 2221 north – Citrus City	
Hidalgo	Sullivan City	82.6	132.9	FM 886 south (El Faro Road) – Los Ebanos, International Ferry, Tamaulipas	
Starr	Alto Bonito	87.9	141.5	FM 2360 – La Grulla, La Victoria	Interchange
Starr		92.1	148.2	FM 1430 west – Garciasville	
Starr	La Puerta	95.4	153.5	FM 1430 east – Garciasville	
Starr	Rio Grande City	99.5	160.1	FM 755 south (Pete Diaz Jr. Avenue) – International Bridge, Tamaulipas	south end of FM 755 overlap
Starr	Rio Grande City	100.5	161.7	FM 755 north (North Flores Street) – La Gloria, Rachal	north end of FM 755 overlap
Starr	Rio Grande City	103.6	166.7	FM 3167 north to FM 649 north – Starr County Airport, Guerra	Access to Starr County Memorial Hospital
Starr	Garceno	109.1	175.6	FM 649 north – El Sauz, Guerra	
Starr	Roma	114.0	183.5	Spur 200 (Bravo Avenue) – International Bridge, Tamaulipas	
Starr	Roma	115.4	185.7	FM 650 west – Fronton	
Starr	Falcon Heights	124.3	200.0	FM 2098 north – Falcon Dam, International Bridge, Falcon State Park, Tamaulipas	
Starr	Falcon Heights	128.1	206.2	FM 2098 south – Falcon Dam, International Bridge, Falcon State Park, Tamaulipas	
Zapata	Chihuahua	141.8	228.2	FM 2687 east / Las Alejandrenas Road	
Zapata	Zapata	155.1	249.6	SH 16 east / FM 496 west (13th Avenue) – Falcon Lake, Hebbronville, Freer	
Zapata	San Ygnacio	169.4	272.6	FM 3169 east	
Zapata	San Ygnacio	169.6	272.9	Bus. US 83 north (Washington Avenue) – Laredo	
Zapata	San Ygnacio	169.9	273.4	Bus. US 83 south (Santa Maria Avenue) – Zapata	
Webb	Rio Bravo	190.6	306.7	Rio Bravo, El Cenizo (Espejo Molina Road)	Interchange
Webb	Laredo	194.2	312.5	To Loop 20 north (Cuatro Vientos Road) / Mangana Hein Road	
Webb	Laredo	200.4	322.5	Spur 260 north (Jamie Zapata Memorial Highway) to SH 359 – Hebbronville, Freer, Texas A&M International University, Lake Casa Blanca International State Park, Airport	
Webb	Laredo	201.1	323.6	SH 359 east to Loop 20 – Hebbronville	Interchange; south end of SH 359 overlap
Webb	Laredo	201.3	324.0	Arkansas Avenue	interchange; no northbound exit
Webb	Laredo	203.6	327.7	I-35 BL south (Houston Street) / Santa Ursula Avenue – International Bridge No. 1, International Bridge No. 2	North end of SH 359 overlap; south end of I-35 overlap
Webb	see I-35				
Webb		221.4	356.3	I-35 north – San Antonio	North end of I-35 overlap; US 83 north follows exit 18
Webb		226.5	364.5	SH 255	interchange
Webb		241.7	389.0	SH 44 east – Encinal	
Dimmit	Catarina	264.0	424.9	FM 133 east – Artesia Wells	
Dimmit		267.1	429.9	FM 2688 south	
Dimmit	Asherton	273.6	440.3	FM 2522 north to FM 190 – Brundage	
Dimmit	Asherton	274.8	442.2	FM 1557 west	
Dimmit	Asherton	276.0	444.2	FM 190 – Brundage	
Dimmit	Asherton	277.5	446.6	FM 190 north – Brundage	
Dimmit		280.0	450.6	FM 1557 – Asherton	
Dimmit		281.1	452.4	FM 1556 north – Carrizo Springs	
Dimmit		283.4	456.1	FM 1917 south	South end of FM 1917 overlap
Dimmit		283.5	456.2	FM 1917 west	North end of FM 1917 overlap
Dimmit	Carrizo Springs	284.0	457.1	Loop 225 west	
Dimmit	Carrizo Springs	284.4	457.7	US 277 north (Peña Street) – Eagle Pass, Del Rio	Access to Dimmit Regional Hospital
Dimmit	Carrizo Springs	284.5	457.9	SH 85 east / Loop 225 east (Nopal Street) – Brundage, Dilley	
Dimmit	Carrizo Springs	285.7	459.8	FM 790 south (9th Street)	
Dimmit	Carrizo Springs	286.0	460.3	Loop 517 west to US 277 north – Del Rio, Eagle Pass	
Dimmit	Carrizo Springs	286.1	460.4	FM 1407 south to SH 85 east	South end of FM 1407 overlap
Dimmit		286.6	461.2	FM 1407 north – Winter Haven	North end of FM 1407 overlap
Dimmit		288.5	464.3	FM 1433 north – Crystal City	
Dimmit		292.2	470.3	FM 1407 south – Winter Haven	
Zavala		293.5	472.3	FM 191 west to FM 1918 south / US 277 north – Eagle Pass	
Zavala	Crystal City	295.4	475.4	Loop 155 east	
Zavala	Crystal City	296.8	477.7	FM 65 south / FM 393 west – Cometa, Brundage	
Zavala	Crystal City	297.3	478.5	FM 1433 south (North 7th Avenue)	
Zavala	Crystal City	299.5	482.0	FM 3292 south	
Zavala		302.6	487.0	FM 1025 east	
Zavala	La Pryor	314.3	505.8	US 57 / Loop 305 north – Eagle Pass, Piedras Negras, Batesville, San Antonio	
Zavala	La Pryor	314.8	506.6	FM 1436 (Dean Street)	
Zavala	La Pryor	315.5	507.7	Loop 305 south	
Zavala	La Pryor	315.9	508.4	FM 1986 west	
Zavala		319.1	513.5	FM 1436 – La Pryor	
Uvalde	Uvalde	333.1	536.1	FM 1435 north (South Evans Street) to US 90	
Uvalde	Uvalde	333.9	537.4	FM 117 south – Batesville	
Uvalde	Uvalde	334.4	538.2	US 90 (Main Street) – Brackettville, Del Rio, Hondo, San Antonio	south end of SH 55 overlap; access to Uvalde Memorial Hospital
Uvalde	Uvalde	335.4	539.8	FM 862 east (Studer Street) – Knippa, Sabinal	
Uvalde	Uvalde	335.9	540.6	FM 1052 west (Oppenheimer Street)	
Uvalde	Uvalde	335.8	540.4	Spur 144 north (North Getty Street) to FM 2369	
Uvalde	Uvalde	336.4	541.4	SH 55 north – Camp Wood, Rocksprings, Sonora	north end of SH 55 overlap
Uvalde		343.1	552.2	RM 2690 north	
Uvalde		354.1	569.9	FM 1051 north – Reagan Wells	
Uvalde	Concan	357.3	575.0	SH 127 south – Sabinal	
Uvalde		365.7	588.5	RM 1050 east to PR 29 – Utopia, Garner State Park	
Real	Rio Frio	367.6	591.6	FM 1120 north to FM 2748 south	
Real	Leakey	373.5	601.1	FM 1120 south – Rio Frio	
Real	Leakey	374.1	602.1	RM 337 – Camp Wood, Vanderpool	
Real	Leakey	375.1	603.7	RM 336 north	
Real		393.0	632.5	SH 39 east – Ingram	
Real		401.6	646.3	SH 41 to US 377 – Rocksprings, Mountain Home, Divide	
Kerr	No major junctions				
Edwards	No major junctions				
Kerr	No major junctions				
Kimble		430.3	692.5	I-10 east – San Antonio	South end of I-10 overlap; US 83 south follows exit 462
Kimble	Junction	432.1	695.4	Loop 481 – Junction	Northbound exit and southbound entrance; I-10 exit 460
Kimble	Junction	434.6	699.4	FM 2169 (Martinez Street) – Junction	I-10 exit 457
Kimble	Junction	436.5	702.5	I-10 west / US 377 south to Loop 481 – Sonora, Junction	North end of I-10 overlap; south end of US 377 overlap; US 83 north follows exit 456
Kimble	Junction	437.7	704.4	US 377 north – London, Mason	North end of US 377 overlap
Menard		456.3	734.3	RM 1773 east to RM 1221	
Menard		462.9	745.0	SH 29 east – Hext, Mason	Interchange
Menard	Menard	465.4	749.0	RM 2291 south – Cleo	
Menard	Menard	466.2	750.3	FM 2092 (San Saba Street)	
Menard	Menard	466.6	750.9	US 190 west – Eldorado, Presidio San Saba, Fort McKavett State Historical Site, Iraan	South end of US 190 overlap
Menard	Menard	467.7	752.7	US 190 east – Brady, San Saba	North end of US 190 overlap
Menard		473.0	761.2	FM 3463 west	
Concho	Eden	487.7	784.9	US 87 – San Angelo, Brady	
Concho	Eden	488.0	785.4	FM 2402 north – Eola	
Concho		499.7	804.2	FM 765 – Eola, San Angelo, Millersview, Fife	
Concho	Paint Rock	508.5	818.4	FM 380 west – San Angelo	
Concho		512.0	824.0	FM 1929 – Lowake, O.H. Ivie Reservoir, Voss	
Runnels		517.4	832.7	FM 2133 west – Rowena	
Runnels		518.4	834.3	FM 2406 east – Bethel	
Runnels	Ballinger	524.7	844.4	US 67 south (West Hutchings Avenue) – San Angelo, Fort Stockton	South end of US 67 overlap
Runnels	Ballinger	524.8	844.6	SH 158 west – Bronte	Access to Ballinger Memorial Hospital
Runnels	Ballinger	525.7	846.0	US 67 north – Coleman, Brownwood, Stephenville	Interchange; north end of US 67 overlap
Runnels	Ballinger	526.2	846.8	FM 382 north – Crews	
Runnels	Hatchel	533.0	857.8	FM 2887 south – Ballinger	
Runnels	Winters	540.0	869.0	SH 153 – Winters Airport, Wingate, Coleman, Crews	
Runnels	Winters	540.4	869.7	Loop 438 east (Wood Street) – Crews, Coleman	South end of Loop 438 overlap
Runnels	Winters	540.5	869.9	Loop 438 west (Dale Street) – Wingate	north end of Loop 438 overlap
Runnels	Winters	541.3	871.1	FM 1770 east – Novice	
Runnels	Winters	542.5	873.1	FM 2405 north – Drasco	
Taylor	Bradshaw	551.3	887.2	FM 1086 west – Happy Valley	
Taylor		554.2	891.9	FM 604 north – Lawn	
Taylor	Ovalo	558.7	899.1	FM 382 south / FM 614 east – Rogers, Crews	
Taylor	Tuscola	561.4	903.5	FM 613 (Graham Street) – Buffalo Gap	
Taylor		564.1	907.8	US 84 east – Lawn, Coleman, Santa Anna	South end of US 84 overlap
Taylor		570.7	918.5	FM 204 east (Clark Road)	
Taylor	Abilene	572.4	921.2	FM 707 – Tye	interchange; south end of freeway
Taylor	Abilene	573.9	923.6	Antilley Road	access to Hendrick Medical Center South
Taylor	Abilene	574.9	925.2	Bus. US 83 north (Treadaway Boulevard) / Loop 322 east – Airport	
Taylor	Abilene	576.2	927.3	Arrowhead Drive	southbound access only
Taylor	Abilene	576.0	927.0	FM 89 (Buffalo Gap Road)	
Taylor	Abilene	576.9	928.4	Southwest Drive	
Taylor	Abilene	578.1	930.4	US 277 south / South 14th Street – San Angelo	South end of US 277 overlap
Taylor	Abilene	579.4	932.5	South 7th Street	
Taylor	Abilene	580.7	934.5	US 84 west / I-20 BL (South 1st Street) – Sweetwater	north end of US 84 overlap
Taylor	Abilene	581.1	935.2	North 1st Street	
Taylor	Abilene	581.4	935.7	North 10th Street	
Taylor	Abilene	582.4	937.3	Ambler Avenue	
Taylor	Abilene	582.9– 583.4	938.1– 938.9	I-20 – El Paso, Fort Worth	I-20 exit 283
Taylor	Abilene	584.6	940.8	(no name)	southbound exit only
Taylor	Abilene	584.5	940.7	FM 2404 / Old Anson Road – Impact	
Taylor	Abilene	585.4	942.1	(no name)	northbound exit only
Taylor	Abilene	585.7	942.6	Bus. US 83 south – Abilene	interchange; north end of freeway; no southbound entrance
Jones		586.3	943.6	FM 3034 east to FM 600 – Lake Fort Phantom Hill	
Jones	Hawley	591.9	952.6	FM 605 west – Hodges	
Jones	Hawley	593.1	954.5	FM 1082 – Lake Fort Phantom Hill	interchange
Jones		599.0	964.0	FM 3326 south – Hawley	
Jones	Anson	602.2	969.1	FM 2746 west to FM 707 south – Tye	
Jones	Anson	603.3	970.9	FM 707 south to FM 2746 west – Tye	
Jones	Anson	604.4	972.7	US 180 – Roby, Snyder, Albany, Mineral Wells	
Jones	Anson	606.1	975.4	US 277 north – Stamford, Wichita Falls	North end of US 277 overlap
Jones		610.0	981.7	FM 1661 north – Tuxedo	
Jones		616.4	992.0	FM 1636 east – Avoca, Corinth	
Jones	Hamlin	620.3	998.3	FM 126 south – Hamlin Lake, Neinda, Merkel	
Jones	Hamlin	621.5	1,000.2	FM 57 south – McCaulley, Sylvester	
Jones	Hamlin	622.1	1,001.2	SH 92 – Rotan, Stamford	
Jones		625.0	1,005.8	FM 540 west – Rotan	
Fisher	No major junctions				
Stonewall	Aspermont	640.5	1,030.8	US 380 east / FM 610 west – Rotan, Haskell, Graham	South end of US 380 overlap
Stonewall	Aspermont	641.5	1,032.4	FM 1263 north (East North Second Street) to FM 3457	
Stonewall		643.9	1,036.3	US 380 west – Jayton, Post	North end of US 380 overlap
Stonewall		656.2	1,056.1	FM 1263 south – Aspermont	
King		674.2	1,085.0	US 82 / SH 114 – Dickens, Benjamin	interchange
King	Guthrie	675.5	1,087.1	Spur 729 west (6th Street)	
King		686.9	1,105.5	FM 193 west – Dumont, East Afton	
King		689.0	1,108.8	FM 1168 north – Grow	
Cottle		693.6	1,116.2	FM 452 west – Delwin	
Cottle		698.5	1,124.1	FM 2278 west – Delwin	
Cottle	Paducah	703.1	1,131.5	FM 1038 east (East Clare Street) – Chalk, Hackberry	
Cottle	Paducah	703.5	1,132.2	US 62 west / US 70 – Matador, Crowell	South end of US 62 overlap
Cottle	Paducah	703.7	1,132.5	FM 1037 north (Backus Street)	south end of FM 1037 overlap
Cottle	Paducah	703.8	1,132.7	FM 1037 south (McAdams Street)	north end of FM 1037 overlap
Cottle	Paducah	704.1	1,133.1	FM 2876 east (Brant Street)	
Cottle		709.8	1,142.3	FM 2998 north	
Cottle		710.9	1,144.1	FM 3256 west – Matador Wildlife Management Area	
Cottle	Dunlap	712.4	1,146.5	FM 2998 south	
Cottle		718.6	1,156.5	FM 1440 west – Cee Vee	
Childress		727.4	1,170.6	FM 2103 west	
Childress		729.9	1,174.7	FM 94 south – Tell, Matador	
Childress	Childress	732.4	1,178.7	FM 2042	
Childress	Childress	733.5	1,180.5	FM 164 – Airport	Access to Childress Municipal Airport
Childress	Childress	734.3	1,181.7	US 287 – Memphis, Quanah	
Childress	Childress	735.1	1,183.0	FM 3181 east to FM 401 south / FM 2530	
Childress		741.8	1,193.8	FM 2465	
Childress		750.8	1,208.3	US 62 east – Hollis, Altus	North end of US 62 overlap
Childress		752.3	1,210.7	SH 256 west – Memphis	
Childress		754.3	1,213.9	FM 1034 east	
Collingsworth	Wellington	763.5	1,228.7	FM 338 (15th Street) – Dodson, Airport	Access to Collingsworth General Hospital and Marian Airpark
Collingsworth	Wellington	764.0	1,229.5	Loop 204 south (8th Street) – Wellington	
Collingsworth	Wellington	764.5	1,230.3	SH 203 east / FM 3197 west – Mangum	South end of SH 203 overlap
Collingsworth	Wellington	766.6	1,233.7	SH 203 west – Quail	North end of SH 203 overlap
Collingsworth		770.7	1,240.3	FM 1981 west	
Collingsworth		772.2	1,242.7	FM 3446 east	
Collingsworth	Lutie	775.7	1,248.4	FM 1439 east	
Collingsworth		777.9	1,251.9	FM 1036 west – Samnorwood	
Wheeler	Shamrock	789.5	1,270.6	FM 2033 east (Railroad Avenue)	
Wheeler	Shamrock	790.3	1,271.9	I-40 BL / Historic US 66 (12th Street) – McLean, Sayre	
Wheeler	Shamrock	790.6	1,272.3	I-40 – Wheeler, Sayre	I-40 exit 163
Wheeler	Twitty	796.5	1,281.8	FM 592 – Kelton	
Wheeler		800.5	1,288.3	FM 1906 east – Kelton	
Wheeler	Wheeler	805.6	1,296.5	FM 2473	
Wheeler	Wheeler	806.4	1,297.8	SH 152 – Pampa, Sayre, Airport	
Wheeler	Briscoe	815.8	1,312.9	FM 1046 – Mobeetie, Allison	
Hemphill		820.5	1,320.5	FM 1268 west	
Hemphill		824.7	1,327.2	FM 277 east – Buffalo Wallow Battleground, Allison	
Hemphill		830.1	1,335.9	FM 3044 east – Lyman Battleground	
Hemphill		832.7	1,340.1	US 60 west / SH 33 east – Miami, Pampa, Amarillo, Watonga	Interchange; south end of US 60 overlap
Hemphill	Canadian	839.8	1,351.5	FM 2388 east (Main Street) – Court House	
Hemphill	Canadian	842.4	1,355.7	FM 2266 east – Gene Howe Wildlife Management Area, Black Kettle National Grassland, Camp Kiowa, Lake Marvin	
Hemphill	Canadian	842.7	1,356.2	US 60 east – Glazier, Higgins, Arnett	North end of US 60 overlap
Lipscomb		857.6	1,380.2	SH 23 north – Booker, Beaver	
Ochiltree		859.7	1,383.6	FM 281 west – Cactus, Sunray	
Ochiltree		878.8	1,414.3	FM 2711 east	
Ochiltree		879.9	1,416.1	SH 70 south – Pampa	
Ochiltree	Perryton	885.0	1,424.3	Loop 143 – Frank Phillips College Allen Campus, Spearman, Booker	
Ochiltree	Perryton	886.0	1,425.9	FM 377 east (9th Avenue)	
Ochiltree	Perryton	886.6	1,426.8	SH 15 (Brillhart Avenue) – Spearman, Booker	
Ochiltree		888.0	1,429.1	Loop 143 south – Booker, Canadian, Pampa	
Ochiltree		888.5	1,429.9	FM 1267 west – Waka, Spearman	
Ochiltree		893.5	1,437.9	US 83 north – Liberal, Garden City	Oklahoma state line
1.000 mi = 1.609 km; 1.000 km = 0.621 mi: Concurrency terminus; Incomplete access

== Gallery ==
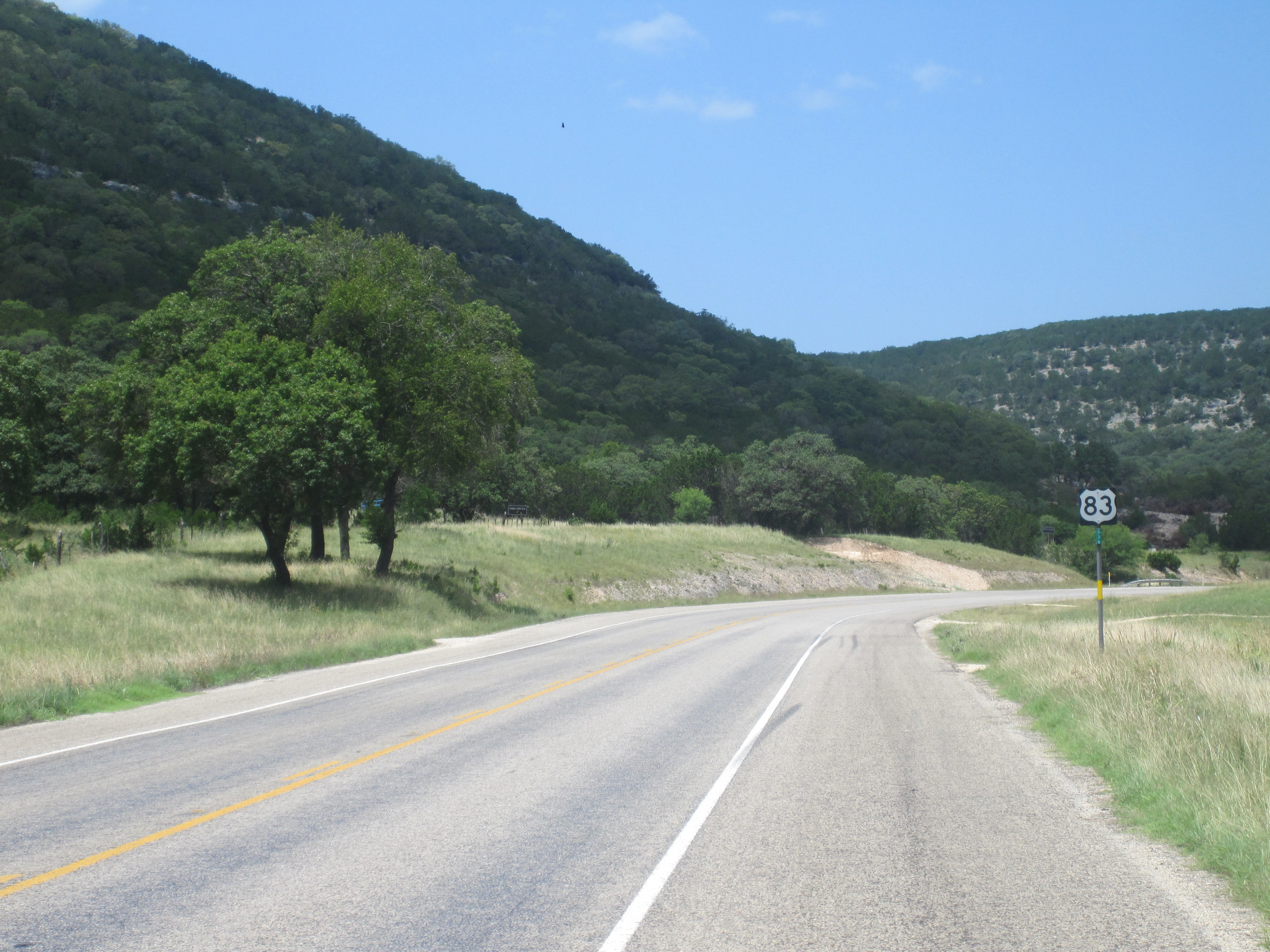
Scenic section of the Texas Hill Country north of Leakey

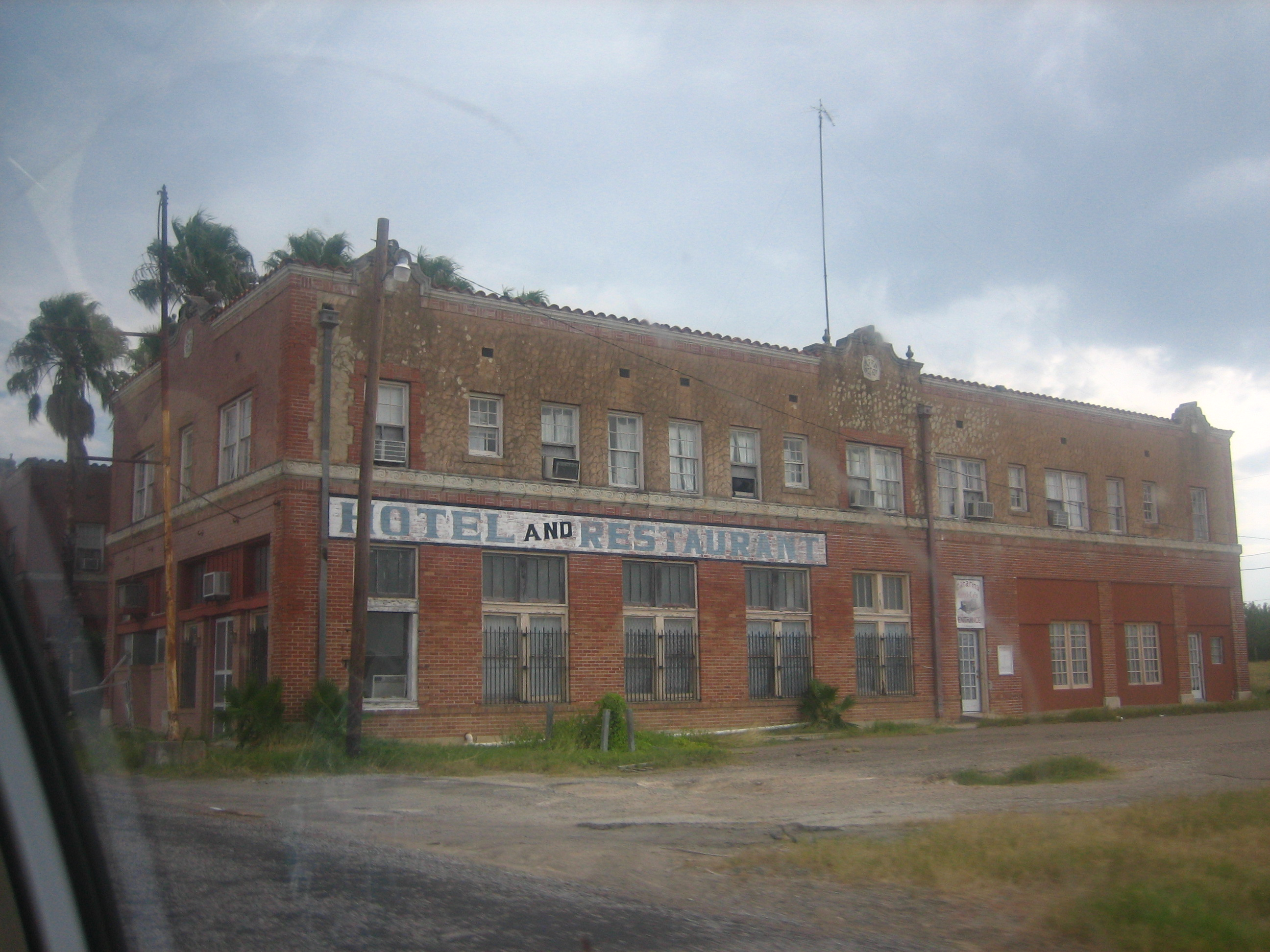
An abandoned hotel and restaurant (built 1926) at Catarina on US 83 near Carrizo Springs

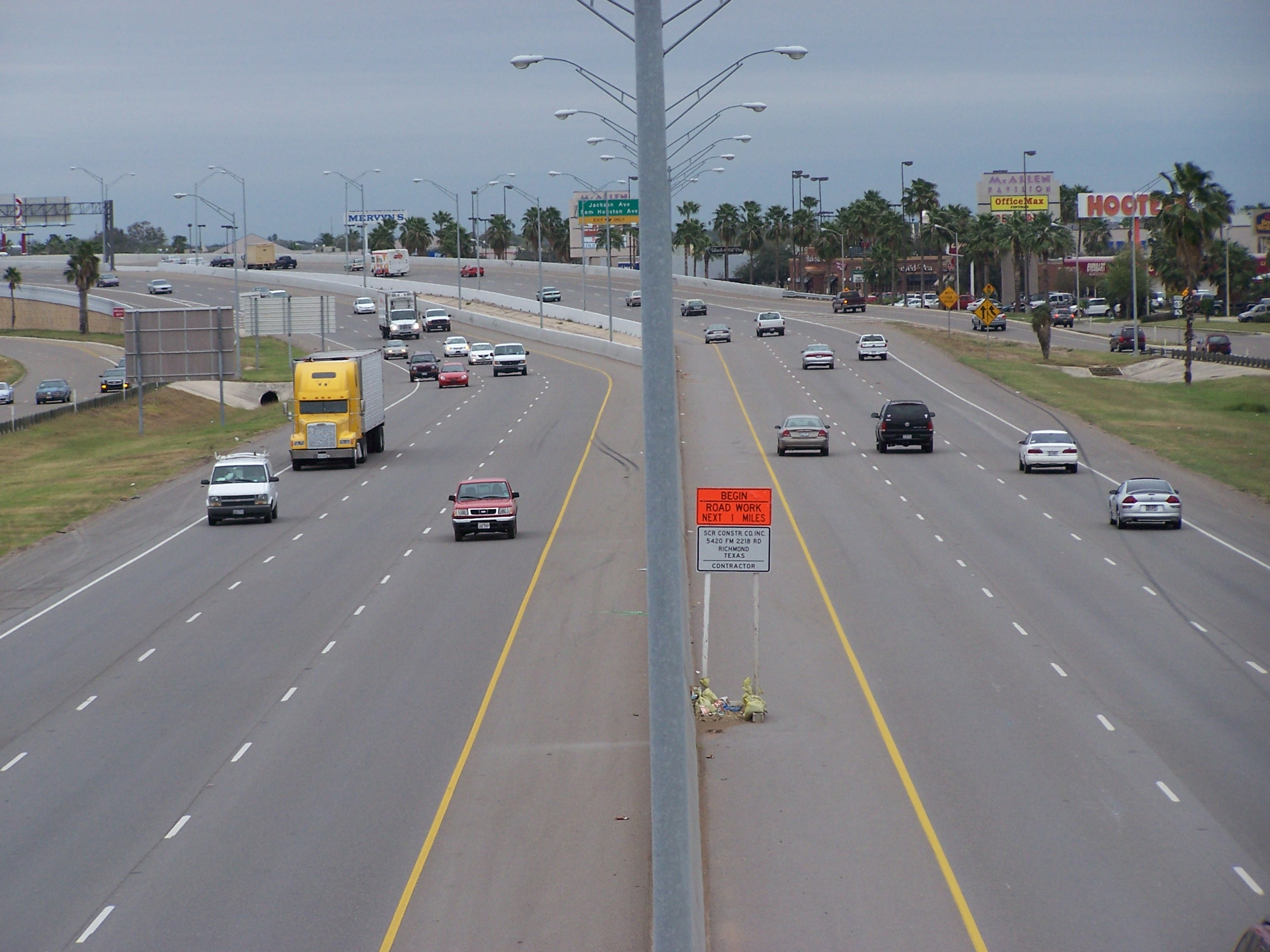
U.S. Highway 83 in a major retail district of McAllen in 2005. I-2 was cosigned on this part of the route in 2013

== See also ==
- Business routes of U.S. Route 83 in Texas

== Notes ==
U.S. Route 83
Previous state: Terminus	Texas	Next state: Oklahoma
