= Duke of Paducah (disambiguation) =

Duke of Paducah is a nickname that may refer to:

- Irvin S. Cobb, nicknamed "Duke of Paducah"
- Benjamin Francis Ford, known as The Duke of Paducah
- William S. Heatly, nicknamed "Duke of Paducah"

== See also ==
- Paducah, Kentucky
- Paducah, Texas
