= Business routes of U.S. Route 83 in Texas =

Business U.S. Highway 83

Route information
- Maintained by TxDOT

Location
- Country: United States
- State: Texas

Highway system
- United States Numbered Highway System; List; Special; Divided; Highways in Texas; Interstate; US; State; Former; Toll; Loops; Spurs; FM/RM; Park; Rec

There are currently three business routes of U.S. Route 83 in Texas that are designated and maintained by the Texas Department of Transportation (TxDOT). The business routes in the US state of Texas are traditionally short spurs or loops that connect the main route, in this case, U.S. Route 83 (US 83), to the center or commercial district of a city. The routes commonly follow the course of a decommissioned state highway, or the old course of the main route. Business routes are signed with the traditional US 83 highway shield, and with a small "business plate" placed above the marker. TxDOT regards business routes as official highways, and is responsible for the maintenance of the route.

== Abilene ==
Business U.S. Highway 83
- Location: Abilene
- Length: 10.367 mi (16.684 km)
- Existed: June 21, 1990–present

Business US Route 83-D (Bus. US 83-D) is a business loop of US 83 that passes through Abilene.

Bus. US 83-D begins at an interchange with US 83 / US 84 / Loop 322 near Kirby Lake. The highway travels in a northern direction along Treadaway Boulevard through an industrial area of the city, seeing more development along its route north of Industrial Boulevard. Bus. US 83-D travels in a northeast direction between Jeanette Street and South 14th Street, intersects SH 36, then has a short overlap with BL I-20 near downtown. The highway travels just east of the city's downtown area through a large commercial area, with development along the route decreasing north of SH 351 near Hardin-Simmons University. The Treadaway Boulevard designation ends at Pine Street, with Bus. US 83-D running along that street. North of Hardin-Simmons, the highway's route becomes more rural with some industrial areas and has an interchange with I-20 southeast of Impact. Bus. US 83-D turns northwest near Huckleberry Road and travels through rural areas of the city before ending at an interchange with US 83 / US 277 near FM 3034.

Bus. US 83-D was designated in 1990 when Loop 243 was decommissioned.

Junction list

The entire route is in Abilene, Taylor County.

mi	km	Destinations	Notes
0.0	0.0	US 83 / US 84 / Loop 322 east – Anson, Sweetwater, Ballinger, Coleman, Airport	Interchange
4.2	6.8	SH 36 south (South 11th Street) – Abilene Zoo, Cross Plains	
4.9	7.9	I-20 BL west (South 1st Street) – Big Spring	South end of BL I-20 overlap
5.1	8.2	I-20 BL east (Highway 80) / North 1st Street – Fort Worth, Texas State Technical College	North end of BL I-20 overlap
6.8	10.9	SH 351 east (Ambler Avenue) – HSU, ACU, Lake Fort Phantom Hill	Access to Hendrick Medical Center
7.9	12.7	I-20 – El Paso, Fort Worth	I-20 exit 286A-B
10.4	16.7	US 83 north / US 277 north – Anson	Interchange
1.000 mi = 1.609 km; 1.000 km = 0.621 mi: Concurrency terminus

== Laredo ==
Business U.S. Highway 83
- Location: Laredo
- Existed: June 21, 1990–March 26, 1991

Business US Route 83-K (Bus. US 83-K) is a former business loop of US 83 that was located in Laredo.

Bus. US 83-K was designated in 1990 when Loop 420 was cancelled. The highway was cancelled in 1991, becoming a part of BL I-35.

== San Ygnacio ==
Business U.S. Highway 83
- Location: San Ygnacio
- Length: 1.057 mi (1.701 km)
- Existed: June 21, 1990–present

Business US Route 83-N (Bus. US 83-N) is a business loop of US 83 that serves the town of San Ygnacio.

Bus. US 83-N begins at an intersection with US 83 two blocks north of FM 3169. The highway travels in a western direction along Washington Avenue, briefly runs in a northern direction along Trevino Street, then turns east onto Uribe Street. Bus. US 83-N turns north onto Morelos Street, then turns northeast onto Santa Maria Avenue before ending at an intersection with US 83 near the San Ygnacio Community Center.

The highway was designated in 1990 when Loop 88 was decommissioned.

== McAllen ==
Business U.S. Highway 83
- Location: Penitas–Harlingen
- Length: 51.1 mi (82.2 km)
- Existed: June 21, 1990–present

Business US Route 83-S (Bus. US 83-S) is a business loop of US 83 in the Lower Rio Grande Valley region. The highway serves as the main street for many communities in the area, such as McAllen, Mission, San Juan, Alamo, and more. This is the longest business loop in Texas, traveling 51 miles and is the third longest bannered US highway in the state; only US 90 Alternate and US 77 Alternate are longer.

The highway was designated in 1990 when Loop 374 was decommissioned.

== San Benito ==
Business U.S. Highway 83
- Location: San Benito
- Length: 4.510 mi (7.258 km)

Business US Route 83-T (Bus. US 83-T) is a business loop of US 83 in the Lower Rio Grande Valley region.

The highway was designated when old US 83 got decommissioned.
