= Dunlap, Texas =

- Unincorporated community
- Location within Texas Location within the United States
- Coordinates: 34°08′26″N 100°17′47″W
- Country: United States
- State: Texas
- County: Cottle
- Elevation: 1,926 ft (587 m)
- Time zone: UTC-6 (Central (CST))
  - Summer (DST): UTC-5 (CDT)
- Area code: 806
- GNIS feature ID: 1379686

Dunlap is an unincorporated community in Cottle County, in the U.S. state of Texas. According to the Handbook of Texas, the community had a population of 10 in 2000.

== Geography ==
Dunlap is located at the intersection of U.S. Route 83 and Farm to Market Road 2998, 8 mi (13 km) north of Paducah and 22 mi (35 km) south of Childress in north-central Cottle County.

== Education ==
Dunlap had its own school in 1908, and joined the Paducah Independent School District in 1936.
