= Paducah High School (Texas) =

Location
- 810 Goodwin Street; Paducah, Texas 79248-1183; United States; 34.014381°N 100.312240°W

Information
- School type: Public high school
- School district: Paducah Independent School District
- Principal: Mandy Moore
- Teaching staff: 17.79 (FTE)
- Grades: PK-12
- Enrollment: 161 (2023–2024)
- Student to teacher ratio: 9.05
- Colors: Orange & White
- Athletics conference: UIL Class A
- Mascot: Dragon
- Website: Paducah High School website

Paducah High School or Paducah School is a public high school located in Paducah, Texas (USA) and classified as a 1A school by the UIL. It is part of the Paducah Independent School District which serves all students in Cottle County. In 2013, the school was rated "Met Standard" by the Texas Education Agency.

== Athletics ==
The Paducah Dragons compete in the following sports

- Basketball
- Cross Country
- 6-Man Football
- Golf
- Tennis
- Track and Field
- Volleyball
- Cheerleading

=== State Titles ===
- Boys Basketball
  - 1987(1A), 1988(1A), 2011(1A/D1)
- Boys Track
  - 1996(1A) 2019 (1A)
- Girls Track
  - 1976(1A), 1977(1A)
- Spirit UIL Competition
  - 2019-2020(1A), 2018-2019(1A), 2017-2018(1A), 2016-2017(1A), 2015-2016(1A)
