= Narcisso, Texas =

Ghost town in Texas, United States of America

Narcisso
- Ghost town
- Location within Texas
- Coordinates: 34°00′01″N 100°28′24″W
- Country: United States of America
- State: Texas
- County: Cottle County
- Established: 20th century
- Founder: Narcisso Townsite Company

Population (1940)
  - Total: 0
- Time zone: UTC– 6:00 (CST)
  - Summer (DST): UTC– 5:00 (CDT)

Narcisso is a ghost town in southwest Cottle County, Texas, United States. Established in the early 20th century, it was entirely abandoned by 1940.

== History ==
In the early 20th century, the Narcisso Townsite Company was established for the purpose of establishing a town west of Paducah, Texas. The location was selected to allow the town to become a stop on the Quanah, Acme and Pacific Railway, which was building into the area. Ten roads were platted, including Dip, Dougie, Acme, Hookie, and Houdin. The name Narcisso was selected by Sam Lazarus, a St. Louis property developer who was active in the enterprise.

While the Quanna, Acme and Pacific Railroad would establish several facilities at the town – including a cotton platform, frame depot, tool shed, and section foreman's house – the Narcisso Townsite Company was unable to sell any of the other lots that had been created for business or residential purposes, and land in the area was eventually marketed in acre parcels for agriculture.

Narcisso turned out to be a disappointment for its boosters, and by 1940, was entirely abandoned. As of the 1980s, it ceased to appear on maps.
