= Cee Vee, Texas =

- Unincorporated community
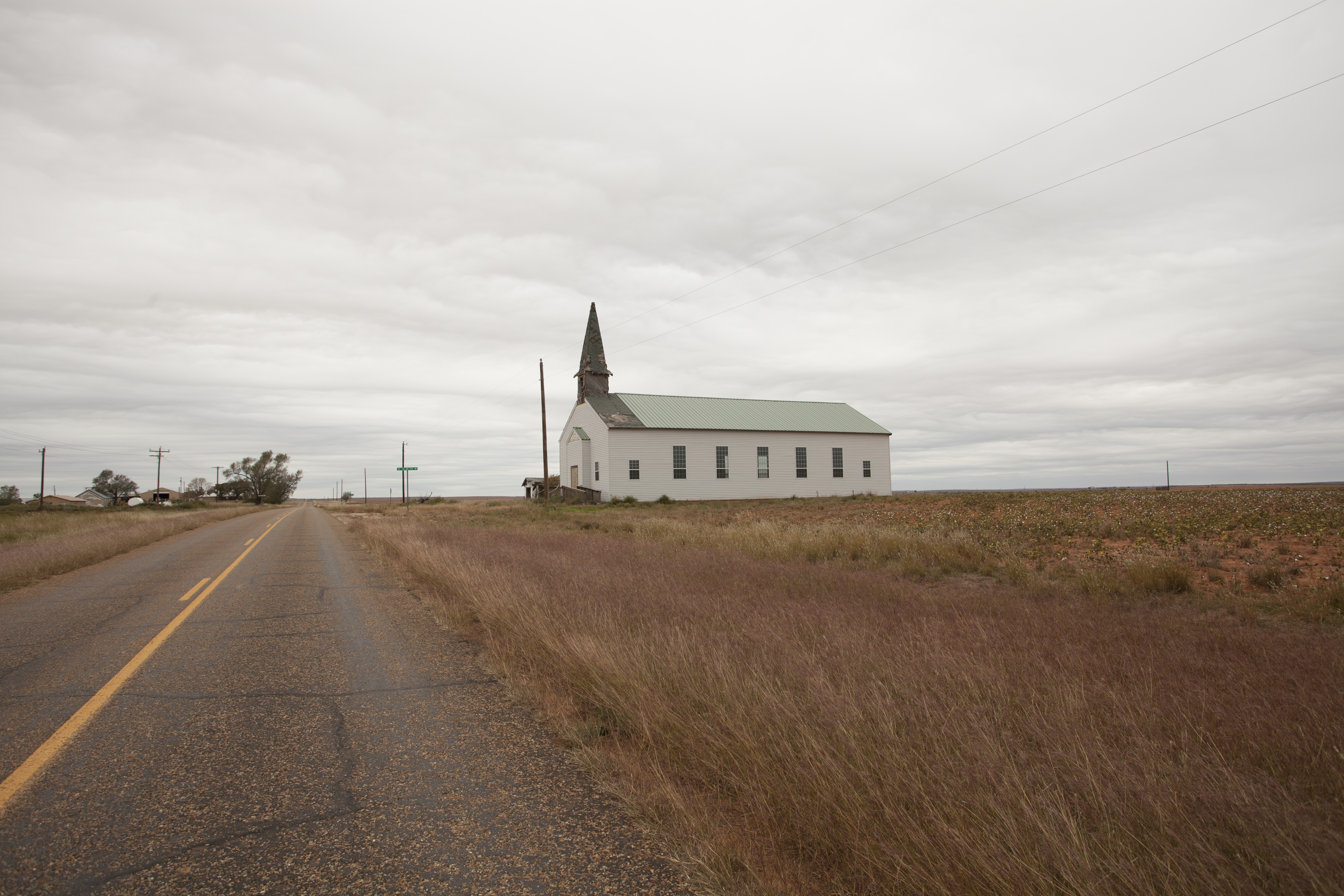
- Cee Vee viewed from FM1440

- Location within Texas Location within the United States
- Coordinates: 34.223125°N 100.445674°W
- Country: United States
- State: Texas
- County: Cottle
- Region: Rolling Plains
- Established: 1927
- Elevation: 1,880 ft (570 m)
- Time zone: UTC-6 (CST)
- ZIP code: 79223
- Area code: 806
- Website: Handbook of Texas

Cee Vee is an unincorporated community in northwestern Cottle County, Texas, United States. According to the Handbook of Texas, the community had a population of 45 in 2000.

== History ==
Cee Vee was established on land that had previously belonged to the CV Ranch. The CV land was part of the property that Lafayette M. Hughes sold out of the Mill Iron Ranch in 1927. That next year, the new settlement was given a post office, and William Newson was appointed postmaster. Postal officials prohibited using initials' but ultimately approved Cee Vee when Newson requested the name of CV for the post office. Around 1929, a gin was constructed, and Cee Vee expanded to include two general stores, a barbershop, and a feed supply. By 1929, congregations of the Methodists, Baptists, and Church of Christ had formed. Local enterprises served a large remote farming area. About 50 people were served by two stores in 1940. The community had 71 residents served by the post office and a business in 1980. The population remained at 71 in 1990, then went down to 45 in 2000.

Although Cee Vee is unincorporated, it has a post office, with the ZIP code of 79223.

On April 22, 2010, an EF2 tornado struck Cee Vee. The large, rain-wrapped, wedge tornado destroyed a storage shed, a windmill, and electrical transformers. Trees were also uprooted. It was upgraded from EF1 to EF2 in postanalysis. That same day, another F3 tornado struck the community. It touched down as the previous one dissipated. It destroyed an unoccupied house and many farm buildings. Trees and shrubs were also uprooted, farming equipment was overturned, and a heavy steel tank was knocked over. It was upgraded from EF1 to EF3 in postanalysis.

== Geography ==
Cee Vee is located on Farm to Market Road 1440, 23 mi (37 km) northwest of Paducah in northwestern Cottle County.

== Education ==
The first school in Cee Vee opened in 1928, and was held in the Mill Iron Ranch headquarters until an actual school was built two years later. It remained in operation until the late 1950s. Today, the community is served by the Paducah Independent School District.
