= Farm to Market Road 1750 =

Road in Texas, United States

Farm to Market Road 1750

Route information
- Maintained by TxDOT
- Length: 12.019 mi (19.343 km)
- Existed: 1951–present

Major junctions
- South end: SH 36
- North end: SH 36 in Abilene

Location
- Country: United States
- State: Texas
- Counties: Callahan, Taylor

Highway system
- Highways in Texas; Interstate; US; State; Former; Toll; Loops; Spurs; FM/RM; Park; Rec
← FM 1749	→ FM 1751

Farm to Market Road 1750 (FM 1750) is a farm to market road located primarily in Taylor County, Texas.

== Route description ==
FM 1750 begins at SH 36; this intersection is actually located in Callahan County. The route travels to the west and quickly enters Taylor County, passing Potosi before turning north and into Abilene. It crosses the Loop 322 freeway west of Abilene Regional Airport and passes to the west of Lytle Lake before ending at another intersection with SH 36.

== History ==
FM 1750 was first designated on May 23, 1951; the original route was a section southward 6.1 miles (9.8 km) from SH 36 in Abilene, but it was extended through Potosi and to another connection with SH 36 on December 17, 1952, adding 6.2 miles (10.0 km). On June 27, 1995, the northern section between FM 707 to SH 36 in Abilene was internally redesignated as Urban Road 1750 (UR 1750), but was redesignated back to FM 1750 on November 15, 2018.

== Major intersections ==
County	Location	mi	km	Destinations	Notes
Callahan		0.0	0.0	SH 36 – Cross Plains	Southern terminus
Taylor		4.6	7.4	FM 204	
Taylor		6.5	10.5	FM 707	
Taylor	Abilene	10.2	16.4	Loop 322 (Jake Roberts Fwy.)	
Taylor	Abilene	12.0	19.3	SH 36 (11th St.)	Northern terminus
1.000 mi = 1.609 km; 1.000 km = 0.621 mi
