= Justice Culver =

Justice Culver may refer to:

- Barbara Culver (1926–2016), justice of the Texas Supreme Court
- Frank P. Culver Jr. (1889–1980), justice of the Texas Supreme Court
