= Texas State Highway Loop 322 =

State highway in Texas

State Highway Loop 322
- Jake Roberts Freeway

Route information
- Maintained by TxDOT
- Length: 7.167 mi (11.534 km)
- Existed: 1957–present

Major junctions
- South end: US 83 / US 84
- SH 36
- North end: I-20

Location
- Country: United States
- State: Texas

Highway system
- Highways in Texas; Interstate; US; State; Former; Toll; Loops; Spurs; FM/RM; Park; Rec
| ← Loop 321 | → Loop 323 |

Loop 322 is a 7.167-mile (11.534 km) loop route in the city of Abilene in the U.S. state of Texas. It is located in Taylor County.

Until the late 1990s, virtually all of Loop 322 was a two-lane freeway. Today, virtually all of the road has been upgraded to typical freeway standards, except its northern terminus, which is an at-grade intersection with the service roads of Interstate 20.

== Route description ==
Loop 322 starts at its junction with the Winters Freeway (US 83 and US 84) and Treadaway Boulevard about 1 mile north of Abilene Regional Medical Center and continues north towards Interstate 20. Loop 322 passes through one of the fastest growing areas of Abilene right before Abilene Regional Airport. After the airport, Loop 322 continues about 2.4 miles to its northern terminus at Interstate 20. Loop 322 mainly traverses rural parts of eastern Abilene.

The highway was designated the "Jake Roberts Freeway" by the city of Abilene in September 1971, after the longtime engineer for the then-Texas Highway Department. It also carries the state memorial designation of the "Officer Rodney T. Holder Memorial Highway", in recognition of the Abilene Police Department motorcycle officer and Cooper High School graduate who died in the line of duty on April 20, 2010 when he was struck by a turning vehicle.

== History ==
Loop 322 was designated on July 16, 1957, running from US 80 (now Business I-20) to SH 36. On June 26, 1962, it was extended north to Interstate 20. On June 28, 1963, it was extended south to US 83 and US 84, completing its current routing.

== Junction list ==
The entire route is in Abilene, Taylor County.

| mi | km | Destinations | Notes |
|---|---|---|---|
| 0.00 | 0.00 | US 83 / US 84 – Ballinger, Coleman, Anson, Sweetwater Bus. US 83 north (Treadaway Boulevard) | Southwestern terminus; westbound exit and eastbound entrance |
| 0.30 | 0.48 | Hill Street | Westbound exit only |
| 0.89 | 1.43 | Maple Street | |
| 1.87 | 3.01 | Industrial Boulevard – Cisco Junior College | |
| 2.70 | 4.35 | FM 1750 – Potosi | |
| 4.80 | 7.72 | SH 36 – Cross Plains, Airport | |
| 5.63 | 9.06 | I-20 BL | Interchange; north end of freeway |
| 7.16 | 11.52 | I-20 – Fort Worth, Sweetwater | Northeastern terminus; I-20 exit 290 |
1.000 mi = 1.609 km; 1.000 km = 0.621 mi: Incomplete access
