= Robert M. Campbell =

American judge (born 1935)

Robert Maurice Campbell (born March 1, 1935) was a justice of the Supreme Court of Texas from December 1, 1978 to January 6, 1988.

Political offices
Preceded by T. C. Chadick	Justice of the Texas Supreme Court; 1978–1988	Succeeded by Barbara Culver
