= Jack Hightower =

American judge (1926–2013)

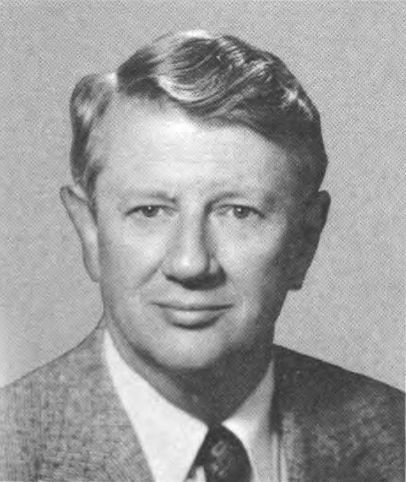

Justice of the Supreme Court of Texas
- In office December 7, 1988 – January 2, 1996
- Appointed by: Bill Clements
- Preceded by: Barbara Culver
- Succeeded by: Greg Abbott

Member of the U.S. House of Representatives from Texas's 13th district
- In office January 3, 1975 – January 3, 1985
- Preceded by: Bob Price
- Succeeded by: Beau Boulter

Member of the Texas Senate from the 23rd district
- In office 1965–1967
- Preceded by: George C. Moffett
- Succeeded by: Oscar Mauzy

Member of the Texas Senate from the 30th district
- In office 1967–1974
- Preceded by: Andrew J. Rogers
- Succeeded by: Ray Farabee

Member of the Texas House of Representatives from the 82nd district
- In office 1953–1955
- Preceded by: 82-1: Pearce Johnson; 82-2: Johnnie B. Rogers
- Succeeded by: William S. Heatly

Personal details
- Born: Jack English Hightower; September 6, 1926 Memphis, Texas, U.S.
- Died: August 3, 2013 (aged 86) Austin, Texas, U.S.
- Resting place: Texas State Cemetery (Austin, Texas)
- Party: Democratic
- Spouse: Colleen Ward (m. 1950)
- Children: 3 daughters
- Relatives: Drew Brees (step-grandson)
- Education: Baylor University (BA); Baylor Law School (LLB); University of Virginia (LLM)
- Occupation: Attorney

Military service
- Branch/service: United States Navy
- Years of service: 1944–1946

Jack English Hightower (September 6, 1926 – August 3, 2013) was a former Democratic U.S. representative from Texas's 13th congressional district, serving five terms from 1975 to 1985.

== Early life ==
Born in Memphis, the seat of Hall County in West Texas, Hightower was a United States Navy sailor for two years during World War II. His parents were Walter Thomas Hightower, a greenhouse proprietor, and Floy Edna (English) Hightower, a homemaker.

== Education and law career ==
In 1949, Hightower received a Bachelor of Arts degree from Baylor University in Waco, Texas. In 1951, he procured an LL.B. from Baylor Law School. Years later in 1992, he obtained an LL.M. from the University of Virginia in Charlottesville, Virginia. He was admitted to the Texas bar in 1951 and immediately became district attorney of the 46th Texas Judicial District, based in Vernon, the seat of Wilbarger County. He served as DA from 1951 to 1961.

== Political career ==
From 1953 to 1955, he was a member of the Texas House of Representatives.

Hightower was an unsuccessful candidate for the U.S. House of Representatives in a special election held in 1961. While still living in Vernon, Hightower served from 1965 to 1974 in two reconfigured districts in the Texas Senate. He was a delegate to the tumultuous 1968 Democratic National Convention, which met in Chicago to nominate Vice President of the United States Hubert H. Humphrey for presidency. That fall, Humphrey narrowly carried Texas over the Republican Richard M. Nixon and the American Independent Party nominee George Wallace of Alabama.

In 1974, Hightower challenged four-term Republican Bob Price of Pampa for a congressional seat and won. Hightower was one of several Democrats elected due to voter anger over Watergate.

Hightower was a fairly moderate Democrat, and served a district that was mostly rural, stretching from Amarillo to Wichita Falls on the east. The district had become increasingly friendly to Republicans at the national level, though Democrats continued to hold most local offices well into the 1990s. Hightower was reelected four times, mainly by stressing constituent services. However, in 1984, he was toppled by Republican challenger Beau Boulter of Amarillo, who benefited from Ronald W. Reagan's massive reelection landslide that year.

== Personal life ==
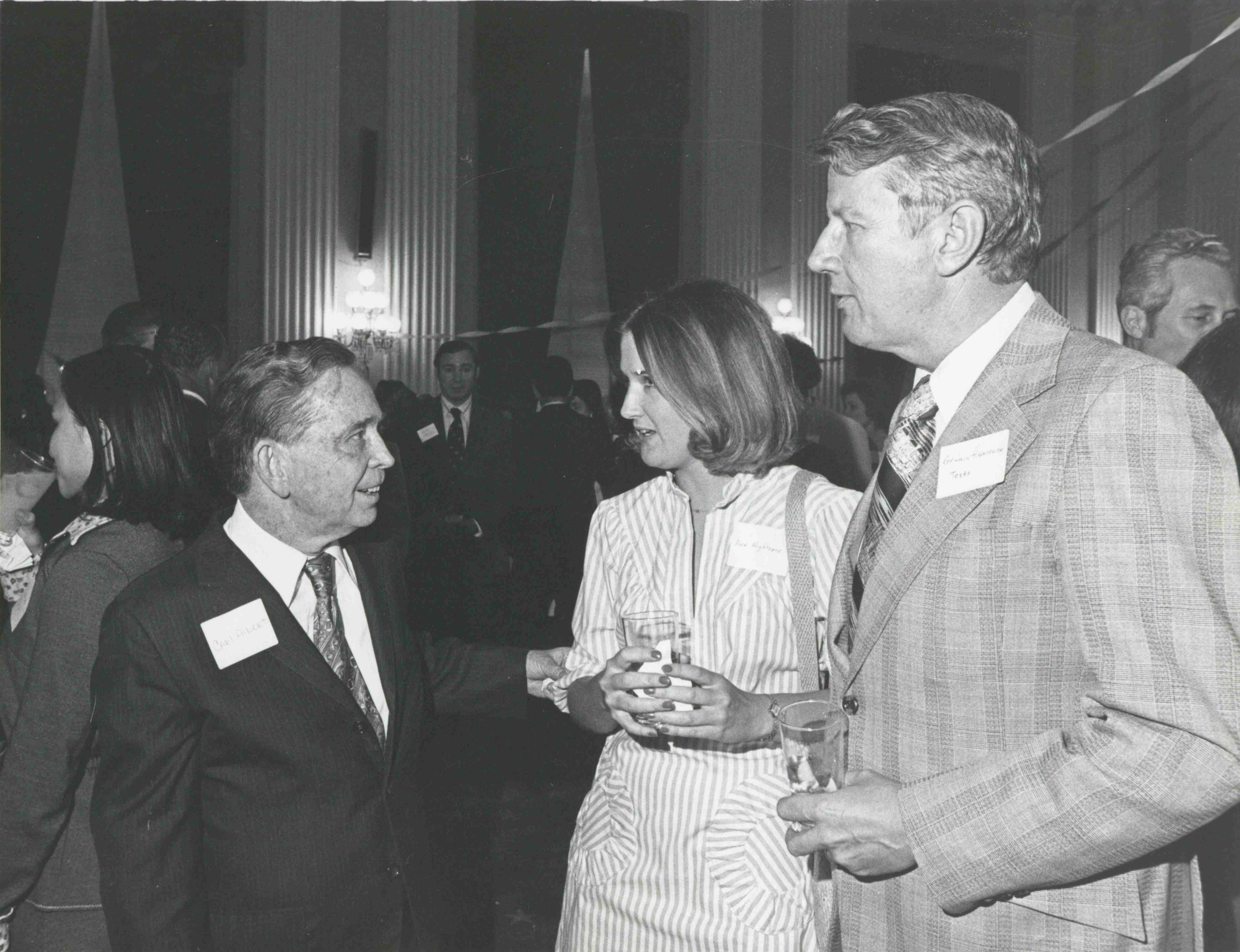
Hightower (right), with Speaker Carl Albert (left) and his wife Colleen.

After he left Congress, Hightower was the first assistant attorney general of Texas under Attorney General Jim Mattox from 1985 to 1987. Hightower was also elected to the Texas Supreme Court in 1988. He was later appointed by U.S. President Bill Clinton to the National Commission on Libraries and Information Science, a position which he held from August 9, 1999, to July 19, 2004.

Hightower married Colleen (née Ward) (1927–2015) in 1950. They first met at Baylor where he was a law student and she was a music major. Colleen died in 2015 and is buried alongside her husband of 63 years. They lived in Austin and had three daughters. He is the step-grandfather of NFL quarterback Drew Brees.

Hightower is not related to former Texas Agriculture Commissioner Jim Hightower.

== Death ==
Hightower died on August 3, 2013, in Austin. Texas Supreme Court Chief Justice Wallace B. Jefferson said, "Texas has lost a true champion among its public servants and the Court has lost a colleague who at his very core was what a judge should be".

Texas House of Representatives
Preceded by 82-1: Pearce Johnson; 82-2: Johnnie B. Rogers	Member of the Texas House of Representatives from District 82 (Vernon); 1953–1955	Succeeded by William S. Heatly
Texas Senate
Preceded by George C. Moffett	Texas State Senator from District 23 (Vernon); 1965–1967	Succeeded by Oscar H. Mauzy
Preceded by Andrew J. Rogers	Texas State Senator from District 30 (Vernon); 1967–1974	Succeeded by Ray Farabee
U.S. House of Representatives
Preceded by Robert "Bob" Price	Member of the U.S. House of Representatives from Texas's 13th congressional district 1975–1985	Succeeded by Beau Boulter
