= Delwin, Texas =

- Unincorporated community ]
- Location within Texas Location within the United States
- Coordinates: 33°52′32″N 100°23′56″W
- Country: United States
- State: Texas
- County: Cottle
- Elevation: 2,001 ft (610 m)
- Time zone: UTC-6 (Central (CST))
  - Summer (DST): UTC-5 (CDT)
- Area code: 806
- GNIS feature ID: 1380841

Delwin is an unincorporated community in Cottle County, in the U.S. state of Texas. According to the Handbook of Texas, the community had a population of 12 in 2000.

== Geography ==
Delwin is located at the intersection of Farm to Market Roads 452 and 2278 in southwestern Cottle County. It is also on Farm to Market Road 1037.

=== Climate ===
According to the Köppen climate classification system, Delwin has a semiarid climate, abbreviated BSk on climate maps.

== Education ==
Delwin had its own school in the late 1890s and joined the Paducah Independent School District in 1963.
