= Chalk, Texas =

- Unincorporated community
- Location within Texas Location within the United States
- Coordinates: 33°52′42″N 100°13′24″W
- Country: United States
- State: Texas
- County: Cottle
- Elevation: 1,778 ft (542 m)
- Time zone: UTC-6 (Central (CST))
  - Summer (DST): UTC-5 (CDT)
- Area code: 806
- GNIS feature ID: 1379526

Chalk is an unincorporated community in Cottle County, in the U.S. state of Texas. According to the Handbook of Texas, the community had a population of 17 in 2000.

== History ==
On June 1, 1954, an F3 tornado struck areas east of Chalk. One person died and 14 were injured.

== Geography ==
Chalk is located on Farm to Market Road 1038 in southern Cottle County.

== Education ==
Chalk had one school from 1914 to 1945. Today, the community is served by the Paducah Independent School District.
