= Hackberry, Cottle County, Texas =

- Unincorporated community
- Location within Texas Location within the United States
- Coordinates: 33°55′56″N 100°08′51″W
- Country: United States
- State: Texas
- County: Cottle
- Elevation: 1,693 ft (516 m)
- Time zone: UTC-6 (Central (CST))
  - Summer (DST): UTC-5 (CDT)
- Area code: 806
- GNIS feature ID: 1379875

Hackberry is an unincorporated community in Cottle County, in the U.S. state of Texas. According to the Handbook of Texas, the community had a population of 30 in 2000.

== Geography ==
Hackberry is located on Farm to Market Road 1038 in southeastern Cottle County.

=== Climate ===
According to the Köppen climate classification system, Hackberry has a semiarid climate, BSk on climate maps.

== Education ==
A school was established in 1914. Today, the community is served by the Paducah Independent School District.
