= T. C. Chadick =

American judge (1909–2005)

Terrell Claude Chadick (September 21, 1909 – May 23, 2005) was a justice of the Supreme Court of Texas from October 5, 1977 to December 31, 1978.

He was president pro tempore of the Texas Senate during the Fiftieth Texas Legislature.

Political offices
Preceded by Thomas Morrow Reavley	Justice of the Texas Supreme Court; 1977–1978	Succeeded by Robert M. Campbell
