= William S. Heatly =

American politician (1912–1984)

William Stanford "Bill" Heatly, Jr.
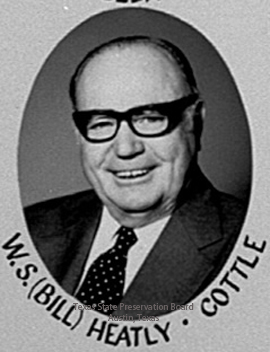
- Photo from 67th Texas Legislative Session

State Representative from District 101 (Baylor, Cottle, Crosby, Dickens, Foard, Garza, Hardeman, Haskell, Kent, King, Knox, Shackelford, Stonewall, Throckmorton, and Wilbarger counties (West Texas)
- In office 1955–1983
- Preceded by: Jack English Hightower
- Succeeded by: Anita Dorcas Hill

Personal details
- Born: September 3, 1912
- Died: February 25, 1984 (aged 71) Paducah, Texas
- Resting place: Garden of Memories Cemetery, Paducah, Texas
- Party: Democratic
- Children: 2

William Stanford Heatly, Jr. (September 3, 1912 – February 25, 1984) was a Democratic member of the Texas House of Representatives who served from 1955 to 1983. Known as the "Duke of Paducah", a reference to his hometown of Paducah, the county seat of Cottle County, Heatly wielded significant political power during his tenure in office.

== Political career ==
First elected to the Texas House in 1954, Heatly had only four opponents during his subsequent twenty-eight years as representative of District 82 and then the nine-county District 80, which was reorganized in 1973 into the 15-county District 101. Heatly became a member of the House Appropriations Committee; in 1959, he was elevated to the chairmanship during the second term of Governor Price Daniel. In that position Heatly became one of the most influential and controversial figures in the legislature, and he seldom concealed the joy with which he wielded his power. He was credited with procuring increased funding in the state's mental-health programs, the prison system, programs for troubled and wayward youth, and cancer research and treatment. He also made several enemies because of his reluctance to spend state funds on what he considered "superfluous" programs and his generosity to favored institutions and agencies.

Often Heatly was accused of using the appropriations bill to induce fellow legislators to vote his way. Many colleagues complained about his ruthless, domineering behavior, which included calling up influential people in their districts to put political pressure on them. Heatly, however, defended the practice by declaring that there was nothing wrong with "practical politics" and recommending that legislators be influenced by hometown voters instead of Austin lobbyists. Governor Preston Smith endorsed Heatly, and he obtained several state-funded projects for his district.

His twenty-four-year tenure on the appropriations committee and the twelve he served as chairman both set records unmatched for at least another decade. Frustrated by the Legislative Redistricting Board's 1980 plan for West Texas counties, Heatly retired from politics in 1982 and returned to Paducah to "take some time to spoil his nine grandchildren."

He was succeeded by the Republican Anita Dorcas Hill (1928–2003) of Garland in Dallas County, in a renumbered and fully reconstituted district.

Heatly was a thirty-third-degree Mason. He was also a past president of the Paducah Lions International and an elder in the Paducah First Christian Church.

== Death ==
Heatly died on February 25, 1984 in his sleep at his home from an apparent heart attack. He is interred at Garden of Memories Cemetery in Paducah.

== Legacy ==
Heatly's son, Gene Heatly, served as 46th Judicial District attorney from 1977 to 1988. Another son, William H. "Bill" Heatly, also a Democrat, was the 50th Judicial District judge, having been elected in 2004.

Heatly's grandson, J. Staley Heatly, is a recognized leader among Texas prosecutors. Elected District Attorney for the 46th Judicial District in November 2006, Heatly, a Democrat, has dedicated his career to public service, focusing on the prevention of domestic violence. In 2013, Heatly founded a domestic violence non-profit, the Texoma Alliance to Stop Abuse (TASA), where he continues to serve as chairman of the board. Under his leadership, TASA has received national recognition from the Rural Justice Collaborative of the National Center for State Courts for its innovative approach to addressing family violence through a coordinated community response (source).

Heatly has also been involved in several criminal justice reform efforts. In 2016, he was appointed to the Timothy Cole Exoneration Review Commission, a state panel created to review wrongful convictions and recommend criminal justice policy reforms to the Texas Legislature. In 2017, he was named Texas Prosecutor of the Year by the Texas District and County Attorneys Association and the Texas State Bar Criminal Justice Section.

Heatly is the author of Family Violence: Investigation and Prosecution, a comprehensive manual for law enforcement and prosecutors tackling domestic violence cases. His efforts to fight domestic violence in his rural jurisdiction were documented in the film Beyond Conviction by Thorne Anderson, which aired on PBS in October 2021.

The Brown-Heatly Building in Austin, which houses the Texas Health and Human Services Commission, is partly named for Heatly.
