= Texas State Highway 351 =

State highway in Texas

State Highway 351
- SH 351, highlighted in red

Route information
- Maintained by TxDOT
- Length: 25.122 mi (40.430 km)
- Existed: 1943–present

Major junctions
- West end: Bus. US 83 in Abilene
- I-20 in Abilene
- East end: US 180 / SH 6 near Albany

Location
- Country: United States
- State: Texas

Highway system
- Highways in Texas; Interstate; US; State; Former; Toll; Loops; Spurs; FM/RM; Park; Rec
← SH 350	→ SH 352

State Highway 351 (SH 351) is a 25.122-mile-long (40.430 km) Texas state highway that travels from Abilene northeast to an intersection with U.S. Route 180 (US 180) west of Albany. The highway was designated on September 6, 1943 as a replacement for US 80 Alternate.

== Route description ==
SH 351 begins at an intersection with US 83 Business (Treadaway Boulevard) in Abilene. The highway heads east through Abilene along Ambler Avenue. It curves to the northeast prior to a diamond interchange with Interstate 20 (I-20). The highway heads northeast as it leaves the Abilene city limits on its way to intersections with FM 1082, FM 604, and FM 3522. It continues to the northeast to its eastern terminus at a concurrency of US 180 and SH 6.

== History ==
SH 351 was commissioned in September 1943 to replace part of what had previously been designated US 80 Alternate (US 80 Alt.).

== Junction list ==
County	Location	mi	km	Destinations	Notes
Taylor	Abilene			Bus. US 83 (Treadaway Boulevard)	Western terminus
Taylor	Abilene			I-20 – Sweetwater, Fort Worth	I-20 exit 288
Taylor	Abilene			FM 2833 north (East Lake Road) – Fort Phantom Hill Lake	
Taylor				FM 1082 north – Robertson Unit	
Callahan	No major junctions				
Jones	No major junctions				
Shackelford				FM 604 south – Clyde	
Shackelford				US 180 / SH 6 – Anson, Albany	Eastern terminus
1.000 mi = 1.609 km; 1.000 km = 0.621 mi
