= Cottle County, Texas =

County in Texas, United States

- County
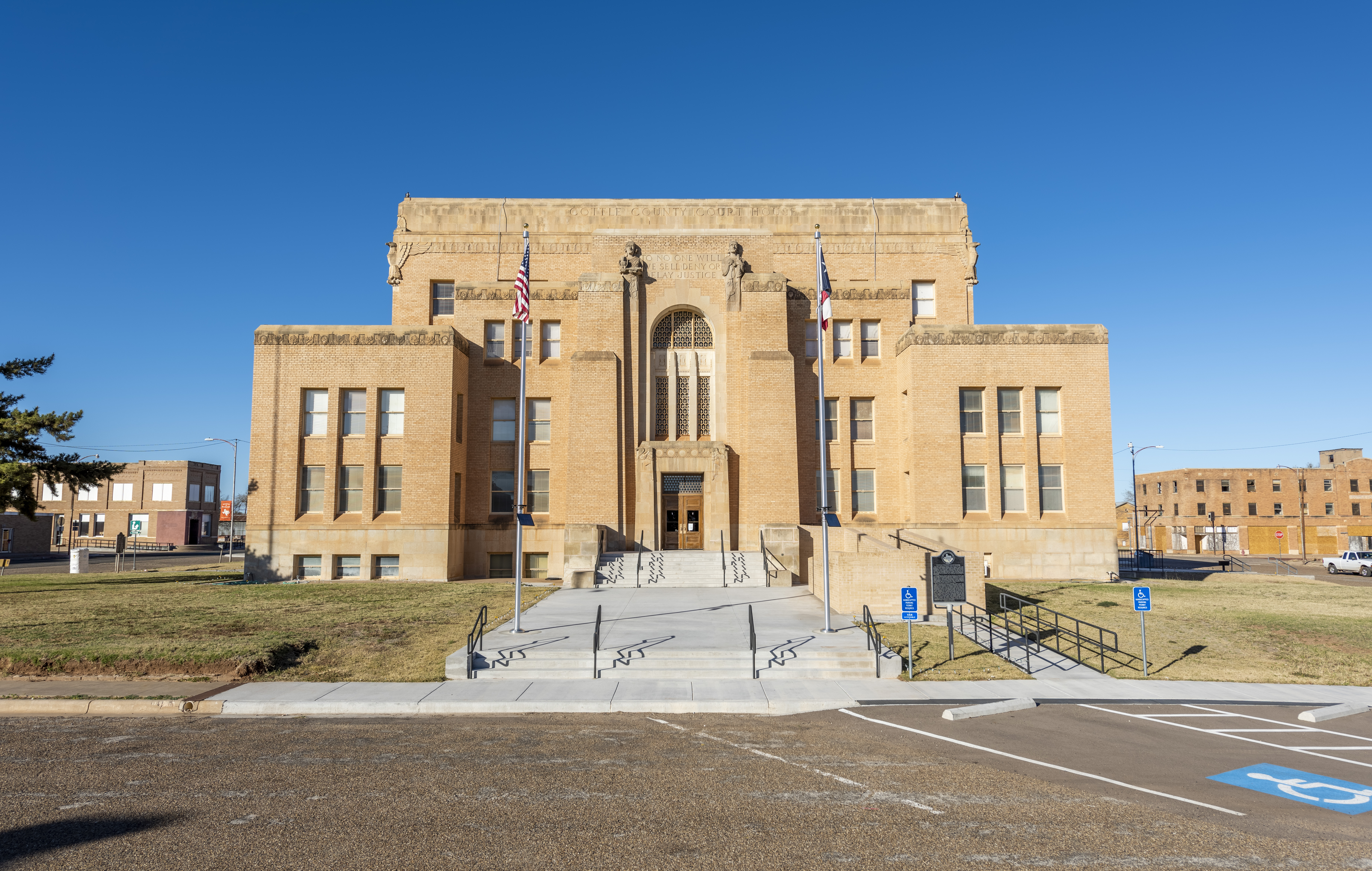
- Cottle County Courthouse in Paducah

- Location within the U.S. state of Texas
- Coordinates: 34°05′N 100°16′W
- Country: United States
- State: Texas
- Founded: 1892
- Named for: George Washington Cottle
- Seat: Paducah
- Largest town: Paducah

Area
  - Total: 902 sq mi (2,340 km^{2})
  - Land: 901 sq mi (2,330 km^{2})
  - Water: 1.1 sq mi (2.8 km^{2}) 0.1%

Population (2020)
  - Total: 1,380
  - Estimate (2025): 1,224 ▼
  - Density: 1.53/sq mi (0.591/km^{2})
- Time zone: UTC−6 (Central)
  - Summer (DST): UTC−5 (CDT)
- Congressional district: 13th
- Website: www.cottlecountytx.gov

Cottle County is a county in the U.S. state of Texas. As of the 2020 census, its population was 1,380. Its county seat is Paducah. The county was founded in 1876 and later organized in 1892. It is named for George Washington Cottle, who died defending the Alamo. Cottle County was formerly one of 46 prohibition or entirely dry counties in Texas. It now allows beer and wine sales.

The Matador Ranch, based in neighboring Motley County, once reached into Cottle County.

== Geography ==
According to the U.S. Census Bureau, the county has a total area of 902 sq mi (2,340 km^{2}), of which 1.1 sq mi (2.8 km^{2}) (0.1%) is covered by water.

=== Major highways ===
- U.S. Highway 62
- U.S. Highway 70
- U.S. Highway 83

=== Adjacent counties ===
- Childress County (north)
- Hardeman County (northeast)
- Foard County (east)
- King County (south)
- Dickens County (southwest)
- Motley County (west)
- Hall County (northwest)

== Demographics ==
Historical population
| Census | Pop. | Note | %± |
|---|---|---|---|
| 1880 | 24 | | — |
| 1890 | 240 | | 900.0% |
| 1900 | 1,002 | | 317.5% |
| 1910 | 4,396 | | 338.7% |
| 1920 | 6,901 | | 57.0% |
| 1930 | 9,395 | | 36.1% |
| 1940 | 7,079 | | −24.7% |
| 1950 | 6,099 | | −13.8% |
| 1960 | 4,207 | | −31.0% |
| 1970 | 3,204 | | −23.8% |
| 1980 | 2,947 | | −8.0% |
| 1990 | 2,247 | | −23.8% |
| 2000 | 1,904 | | −15.3% |
| 2010 | 1,505 | | −21.0% |
| 2020 | 1,380 | | −8.3% |
| 2025 (est.) | 1,224 | ▼ | −11.3% |
U.S. Decennial Census; 1850–2010 2010 2020

=== Racial and ethnic composition ===
Cottle County, Texas – Racial and ethnic composition Note: the US Census treats Hispanic/Latino as an ethnic category. This table excludes Latinos from the racial categories and assigns them to a separate category. Hispanics/Latinos may be of any race.
| Race / Ethnicity (NH = Non-Hispanic) | Pop 2000 | Pop 2010 | Pop 2020 | % 2000 | % 2010 | % 2020 |
|---|---|---|---|---|---|---|
| White alone (NH) | 1,348 | 1,043 | 902 | 70.80% | 69.30% | 65.36% |
| Black or African American alone (NH) | 176 | 129 | 96 | 9.24% | 8.57% | 6.96% |
| Native American or Alaska Native alone (NH) | 0 | 4 | 2 | 0.00% | 0.27% | 0.14% |
| Asian alone (NH) | 0 | 0 | 0 | 0.00% | 0.00% | 0.00% |
| Pacific Islander alone (NH) | 0 | 1 | 1 | 0.00% | 0.07% | 0.07% |
| Other race alone (NH) | 0 | 3 | 0 | 0.00% | 0.20% | 0.00% |
| Multiracial (NH) | 20 | 9 | 52 | 1.05% | 0.60% | 3.77% |
| Hispanic or Latino (any race) | 360 | 316 | 327 | 18.91% | 21.00% | 23.70% |
| Total | 1,904 | 1,505 | 1,380 | 100.00% | 100.00% | 100.00% |

=== 2020 census ===
As of the 2020 census, the county had a population of 1,380. The median age was 47.0 years. 20.5% of residents were under the age of 18 and 26.8% of residents were 65 years of age or older. For every 100 females there were 94.6 males, and for every 100 females age 18 and over there were 88.8 males age 18 and over.

The racial makeup of the county was 74.4% White, 7.0% Black or African American, 0.4% American Indian and Alaska Native, <0.1% Asian, 0.1% Native Hawaiian and Pacific Islander, 8.8% from some other race, and 9.3% from two or more races. Hispanic or Latino residents of any race comprised 23.7% of the population.

<0.1% of residents lived in urban areas, while 100.0% lived in rural areas.

There were 613 households in the county, of which 28.7% had children under the age of 18 living in them. Of all households, 48.0% were married-couple households, 20.6% were households with a male householder and no spouse or partner present, and 26.8% were households with a female householder and no spouse or partner present. About 29.7% of all households were made up of individuals and 15.2% had someone living alone who was 65 years of age or older.

There were 891 housing units, of which 31.2% were vacant. Among occupied housing units, 74.9% were owner-occupied and 25.1% were renter-occupied. The homeowner vacancy rate was 4.1% and the rental vacancy rate was 17.7%.

=== 2000 census ===
As of the 2000 United States census, 1,904 people, 820 households, and 550 families resided in the county. The population density was 2 people/mi^{2} (0.77 people/km^{2}). The 1,088 housing units averaged 1 per square mile (0.39/km^{2}). The racial makeup of the county was 81.46% White, 9.87% African American, 7.20% from other races, and 1.47% from two or more races. About 18.91% of the population was Hispanic or Latino of any race.

Of the 820 households, 28.0% had children under 18 living with them, 53.9% were married couples living together, 10.6% had a female householder with no husband present, and 32.9% were not families. Around 32.0% of all households were made up of individuals, and 20.9% had someone living alone who was 65 or older. The average household size was 2.28, and the average family size was 2.84.

In the county, the age distribution was 23.9% under 18, 5.7% from 18 to 24, 21.5% from 25 to 44, 23.3% from 45 to 64, and 25.6% who were 65 or older. The median age was 44 years. For every 100 females, there were 87.2 males. For every 100 females 18 and over, there were 81.9 males.

The median income for a household in the county was $25,446, and for a family was $33,036. Males had a median income of $24,375 versus $16,667 for females. The per capita income for the county was $16,212. About 13.70% of families and 18.40% of the population were below the poverty line, including 28.4% of those under 18 and 16.0% of those 65 or over.

== Politics ==
Until 2000, Cottle County went consistently Democratic in presidential elections, except for the 1928 election, when sentiment against Al Smith’s devout Catholic faith and opposition to Prohibition allowed Herbert Hoover to carry the county with 51% of the vote. After John F. Kennedy, Lyndon Johnson, and Hubert Humphrey easily carried the county in 1960, 1964, and 1968, respectively, Cottle County again voted for the Democratic candidate in the 1972 election, as it was the only county in Texas north of Maverick County (Eagle Pass) to have been won by George McGovern, albeit by a margin of only seven votes. After Jimmy Carter carried it in 1976 and 1980, Walter Mondale won a majority of the county's votes in 1984, Michael Dukakis won the county in 1988 and Bill Clinton carried it in 1992 and 1996.

Like the rest of the Bible Belt, Cottle has trended powerfully Republican and in the last six elections, the Republican nominee has won more than two-thirds of the vote. In 2012, Mitt Romney received 555 votes to Barack Obama’s 180, and in 2016, Hillary Clinton won fewer than 100 votes in the county, less than a tenth as many as Jimmy Carter 40 years before.

Cottle County is located within District 69 of the Texas House of Representatives. Cottle County is located within District 28 of the Texas Senate.

United States presidential election results for Cottle County, Texas
| Year | Republican | | Democratic | | Third party(ies) | |
| Year | No. | % | No. | % | No. | % |
|---|---|---|---|---|---|---|
| 1912 | 8 | 2.64% | 277 | 91.42% | 18 | 5.94% |
| 1916 | 12 | 2.24% | 455 | 85.05% | 68 | 12.71% |
| 1920 | 121 | 18.22% | 472 | 71.08% | 71 | 10.69% |
| 1924 | 59 | 8.97% | 580 | 88.15% | 19 | 2.89% |
| 1928 | 473 | 51.19% | 451 | 48.81% | 0 | 0.00% |
| 1932 | 38 | 3.08% | 1,196 | 96.92% | 0 | 0.00% |
| 1936 | 86 | 6.33% | 1,265 | 93.08% | 8 | 0.59% |
| 1940 | 237 | 13.60% | 1,506 | 86.40% | 0 | 0.00% |
| 1944 | 130 | 4.68% | 2,551 | 91.89% | 95 | 3.42% |
| 1948 | 102 | 7.02% | 1,318 | 90.71% | 33 | 2.27% |
| 1952 | 494 | 26.53% | 1,368 | 73.47% | 0 | 0.00% |
| 1956 | 329 | 22.40% | 1,138 | 77.47% | 2 | 0.14% |
| 1960 | 370 | 27.19% | 986 | 72.45% | 5 | 0.37% |
| 1964 | 230 | 17.00% | 1,122 | 82.93% | 1 | 0.07% |
| 1968 | 268 | 21.00% | 742 | 58.15% | 266 | 20.85% |
| 1972 | 564 | 49.69% | 571 | 50.31% | 0 | 0.00% |
| 1976 | 311 | 22.85% | 1,047 | 76.93% | 3 | 0.22% |
| 1980 | 511 | 40.36% | 732 | 57.82% | 23 | 1.82% |
| 1984 | 507 | 44.09% | 623 | 54.17% | 20 | 1.74% |
| 1988 | 379 | 35.00% | 690 | 63.71% | 14 | 1.29% |
| 1992 | 245 | 23.90% | 542 | 52.88% | 238 | 23.22% |
| 1996 | 331 | 40.46% | 404 | 49.39% | 83 | 10.15% |
| 2000 | 502 | 66.31% | 241 | 31.84% | 14 | 1.85% |
| 2004 | 549 | 71.48% | 214 | 27.86% | 5 | 0.65% |
| 2008 | 509 | 72.20% | 187 | 26.52% | 9 | 1.28% |
| 2012 | 555 | 74.90% | 180 | 24.29% | 6 | 0.81% |
| 2016 | 506 | 82.68% | 92 | 15.03% | 14 | 2.29% |
| 2020 | 540 | 81.57% | 113 | 17.07% | 9 | 1.36% |
| 2024 | 565 | 86.00% | 89 | 13.55% | 3 | 0.46% |

United States Senate election results for Cottle County, Texas1
| Year | Republican | | Democratic | | Third party(ies) | |
| Year | No. | % | No. | % | No. | % |
|---|---|---|---|---|---|---|
| 2024 | 544 | 84.60% | 90 | 14.00% | 9 | 1.40% |

United States Senate election results for Cottle County, Texas2
| Year | Republican | | Democratic | | Third party(ies) | |
| Year | No. | % | No. | % | No. | % |
|---|---|---|---|---|---|---|
| 2020 | 534 | 81.40% | 110 | 16.77% | 12 | 1.83% |

Texas Gubernatorial election results for Cottle County
| Year | Republican | | Democratic | | Third party(ies) | |
| Year | No. | % | No. | % | No. | % |
|---|---|---|---|---|---|---|
| 2022 | 453 | 88.13% | 54 | 10.51% | 7 | 1.36% |

== Communities ==
=== Town ===
- Paducah (county seat)

=== Unincorporated communities ===
- Cee Vee
- Chalk
- Delwin
- Dunlap
- Hackberry

=== Ghost towns ===
- Ginsite
- Narcisso
- Ogden
- Sneedville
- Swearingen

== Education ==
School districts serving sections of the county include:

- Childress Independent School District
- Paducah Independent School District
- Quanah Independent School District

The county is in the service area of Vernon College.

== See also ==
- National Register of Historic Places listings in Cottle County, Texas
- Recorded Texas Historic Landmarks in Cottle County
