= Barbara Culver =

American judge

Barbara Green Culver (later Barbara Culver Clack; February 9, 1926 – September 12, 2016) was a justice of the Texas Supreme Court.

Culver was born in Dallas, Texas, the daughter of Lawrence F. and Alice Bryson Green. She graduated from Texas Tech University in 1947. She practiced law together in Midland, Texas with her first husband John Culver for ten years following their graduation from the Southern Methodist University Law School in 1951. She was initially hired to read law for Culver, a World War II veteran who was determined to study law despite losing his eyesight during wartime. However, due to the volume of work, she decided to earn a law degree too.

In 1962, upon being elected as the Judge of Midland County, she became the first Republican (and female) to hold and oversee a county office in Midland. Due to how the county’s court system was constructed, Culver headed the commissioner’s court and presided over matters that included probate proceedings. On February 1, 1988, Culver became the second female appointed as a justice of the Texas Supreme Court. She ran for election to keep in her seat in November of that same year, but lost to Jack Hightower. Culver remained on the bench until December 7, 1988. It was also in 1988 that Culver married her second husband James H. Clack, a retired judge. The Justice Barbara Culver Juvenile Justice Center, originally called the Culver Youth Home, in Midland, Texas was renamed in her honor after it was expanded.

She died on September 12, 2016.

== See also ==
- List of justices of the Texas Supreme Court

Political offices
Preceded by Robert M. Campbell	Justice of the Texas Supreme Court; February 1, 1988 – December 7, 1988	Succeeded by Jack English Hightower
