= Hendrick Health System =

Coordinates: 32.4716°N 99.7325°W

Hendrick Health is a not-for-profit healthcare provider located in Abilene, Texas, United States. It is affiliated with the Baptist General Convention of Texas.

It provides a comprehensive range of healthcare services, including a medical center licensed for 564 beds.

More than 3,000 employees make up the Hendrick team.

== History ==
Hendrick Medical Center, originally West Texas Baptist Sanitarium, opened on September 15, 1924. The original facility had five floors, seventy-five beds, fireproof construction, steam heat, hot and cold running water in every room and three elevators. The hospital was the result of the vision of Millard A. Jenkins, pastor of the First Baptist Church of Abilene. When a proposition to build a countywide hospital in Taylor County was voted down in 1921, Jenkins gathered a group of Abilene community members to help take on the dream of building a hospital. A sprawling 6-acre (24,000 m^{2}) field on the outskirts of north Abilene was donated by Clifton M. Caldwell and his wife as a location for the hospital. In the early 1930, the Great Depression put the hospital in financial trouble. The depression increased the need for charity care, while churches were too feeble to support the hospital. To help keep its doors open, the hospital accepted chickens, goats and black-eyed peas as payment for service. In 1936, the hospital was saved from bankruptcy by West Texas ranchers Mr. and Mrs. T. G. Hendrick. They paid off the mortgage and gave additional money for the construction of a new wing. In recognition of their generosity, the hospital was renamed in honor of the Hendricks.

== Facilities ==
In August 2008, Hendrick announced plans for an $80 million expansion project called Project 2010. The project is the largest expansion in the hospital's 84-year history and will re-shape the Hendrick campus through new facilities and extensive upgrades to a number of areas. Components of Project 2010 include: a new four-story patient tower with expanded support services, new surgery facilities, labor and delivery and Hendrick Children's Hospital; a new physician office building; a new Wound Care Center and Dialysis Unit; and a canopy-covered entrance and lobby.

== Services ==
Hendrick offers numerous services to the Texas Midwest region, including: Hendrick Heartsaver Network, Hendrick Children's Hospital, Hendrick Cancer Center, Hendrick Center for Rehabilitation, Vera West Women's Center, The BirthPlace at Hendrick, Level III Trauma Center, Hendrick Health Club, Hendrick Hearing HealthCare, Hendrick Hospice Care, Hendrick HouseCalls, Hendrick League House, Hendrick Long Term Acute Care, Hendrick Medical Center Foundation, Hendrick Medical Supply, Hendrick Professional Pharmacy, Hendrick Radiology Center, Hendrick Regional Laboratory, Hendrick Balance Center, Hendrick Sleep Disorders Center, Hendrick Regional Blood Center, First Care Health Plans, Pastoral Care, Sellers Health Sciences Library and Skilled Nursing Facilities.

== Awards ==
In 2007, Hendrick was one of only 12 organizations worldwide honored with the Gallup Exceptional Workplace Award, which honors Hendrick as one of the most engaged and productive workforces in the world. Hendrick has since earned the Gallup Exceptional Workplace Award every subsequent year.

Hendrick also has received the Pathway to Excellence designation from the American Nurses Credentialing Center (ANCC). The designation recognizes Hendrick as creating a work environment where nurses can flourish and identifies it as one of the best places to work.
