= Abilene Regional Airport =

- IATA: ABI; ICAO: KABI; FAA LID: ABI

Summary
- Airport type: Public
- Owner/Operator: City of Abilene
- Serves: Abilene, Texas
- Elevation AMSL: 1,790.6 ft (545.8 m)
- Coordinates: 32°24′47.7″N 099°40′59.2″W
- Website: iflyabi.com

Map
- Location within Texas Location within the United States

Runways
Direction	Length		Surface
Direction	ft	m	Surface
17L/35R	7,198	2,194	Asphalt
17R/35L	7,202	2,195	Asphalt

Statistics (2023)
- Aircraft operations (year ending 5/31/2023): 41,459
- Based aircraft: 105
- Sources: airport website and FAA

Abilene Regional Airport (IATA: ABI, ICAO: KABI, FAA LID: ABI) is a public airport located approximately 3 miles (4.8 km) southeast of downtown Abilene, in Taylor County, Texas. The airport is located within the Abilene city limits, and is owned and operated by the city.

Most operations at the airport are general aviation and military training. Abilene Regional is currently [when?] served by Envoy Air, operating as American Eagle, operating daily Embraer regional jet flights to Dallas-Ft. Worth (DFW).

In October 2020, United Express began daily flights to Houston-Intercontinental, operated by SkyWest Airlines. The airline ceased all flights to the airport in October 2021, citing staffing issues.

Allegiant Airlines operated twice-weekly flights to Las Vegas (LAS) with McDonnell Douglas MD-80 jetliners in 2006–07 before ceasing all service to Abilene. Charter air carriers, such as Sun Country Airlines, continue to operate flights on an occasional basis from Abilene to Las Vegas with mainline jet aircraft, such as the Boeing 737.

Air freight service to Abilene is provided primarily by subcontractors. The airport was formerly served by major carriers; UPS and USPS now [when?] primarily truck their overnight packages in from Dallas-Fort Worth, and most Abilene-bound FedEx Express shipments are sent through Lubbock.

Native Air (formerly Southwest Medevac) housed an emergency medical helicopter and crew at the airport for about 10 years, but closed the base in 2014. The city's remaining emergency medical helicopter service is provided by Air Evac Lifeteam, with its aircraft and crew stationed at Hendrick Medical Center.

Abilene Regional is also home to Eagle Aviation Services, Inc., which is a heavy-maintenance base for all American Eagle aircraft. Basically every plane in the airline's fleet is maintained at ABI. The airport grounds also acted as an aircraft boneyard for American Eagle, which stored around 20 retired Saab 340 turboprop aircraft which remain in the airline's livery. American Eagle replaced these propjets with Embraer regional jets. As of 2023, American Eagle was serving Abilene Airport with flights to the Dallas-Fort Worth airport.

Texas State Technical College provides aviation maintenance training at its on-field hangar base.

== Past airline service ==
In the 1930s, Abilene was a stop on American Airlines’ overnight service between Dallas and Los Angeles. American's 12-passenger Curtiss Condors had sleeper berths and flew Dallas Love Field - Ft. Worth - Abilene - Big Spring, TX - El Paso - Douglas, AZ - Tucson - Phoenix - Los Angeles. In the 1940s, American's Douglas DC-3s flew Dallas Love Field - Abilene - Big Spring - El Paso - Tucson - Phoenix - San Diego - Los Angeles. American left Abilene in 1949 and would not return until American Eagle service began in the 1980s.

Starting in the 1940s, Pioneer Air Lines Douglas DC-3s and Martin 2-0-2s flew to Dallas Love Field, Houston Hobby Airport, Albuquerque, Fort Worth, Amarillo, Lubbock and other cities in Texas and New Mexico. Pioneer was merged into Continental Airlines in 1955; Continental DC-3s flew to cities served by Pioneer and added direct service to San Antonio. In 1958-59 Continental served Abilene with the Convair 340, Convair 440, and the four engine Vickers Viscount. In 1959 Viscounts flew direct to Dallas Love Field and Albuquerque. Continental left Abilene in 1963, replaced by Trans-Texas Airways (TTa). Continental would not return, but Continental Connection Colgan Air Saab 340s eventually began flying Abilene to Houston Intercontinental Airport; that ended in 2008.

Trans-Texas DC-3s, Convair 240s, and Convair 600s flew from Abilene to Dallas Love Field and other cities in Texas and New Mexico. Trans-Texas began the first jet service, Douglas DC-9-10s by 1968. TTa flew nonstop to Austin and Lubbock and direct to Albuquerque, Amarillo, Houston Hobby Airport, San Antonio and Santa Fe. Most flights were Convair 600s but some DC-9s flew via Dallas direct to Austin and Houston. Trans-Texas Airways changed its name to Texas International (TI) and continued DC-9 and Convair 600 flights at Abilene. TI served Amarillo and Lubbock from Abilene, and DC-9s flew to Dallas Love Field and to Dallas/Fort Worth Airport (DFW) after it opened. In 1970 Texas International had four flights a day to Dallas, two being DC-9s. Both DC-9 flights to Dallas continued direct to San Antonio. TI Convair 600s flew to Albuquerque, and a DC-9 flew nonstop to San Angelo, an extension of a flight from Dallas. In 1976 the airport had international service of a sort as Texas International DC-9s flew direct to Mexico City four days a week via Dallas/Fort Worth and Houston. The OAG lists TI DC-9s from Austin, Laredo, McAllen, San Angelo and San Antonio in addition to the service from Dallas/Fort Worth. In 1979 Texas International scheduled up to four nonstop DC-9s a day from San Antonio to ABI in addition to the four DC-9s a day to Dallas/Ft. Worth. With the merger of Texas International and Continental Airlines, TI left Abilene and the airport lost its only jet service in the early 1980s.

Jet service returned in 1984 when the original Frontier Airlines (1950-1986) began flying Boeing 737-200s direct to Denver via Midland/Odessa. By spring 1985 Frontier had dropped Abilene, which again lost jet service. Reliable jet service would not return to Abilene until American Eagles Embraer ERJ-140 and Embraer ERJ-145s arrived.

United Airlines via United Express flown by code sharing partner SkyWest Airlines operated nonstop service to Houston from October 2020 to October 2021.

== Chaparral Airlines ==
Chaparral Airlines was a regional airline based in Abilene that began service in the 1976 with Beechcraft 99 and CASA 212 twin engine turboprops as well as small twin engine piston powered Piper Aircraft. In 1979 Chaparral flew nonstop to both Dallas Love Field and Dallas/Fort Worth International Airport and also nonstop to Austin and Houston Hobby Airport. It then introduced 37-passenger larger Grumman Gulfstream I-Cs, a stretched version of the Gulfstream I business propjet. In 1984 Chaparral flew nonstop from Abilene to Austin, Dallas/Ft. Worth (DFW) and Houston Hobby and to San Antonio via Austin. Chaparral became an American Eagle airline flying code share service for American Airlines on December 1, 1984.

== Facilities and aircraft ==
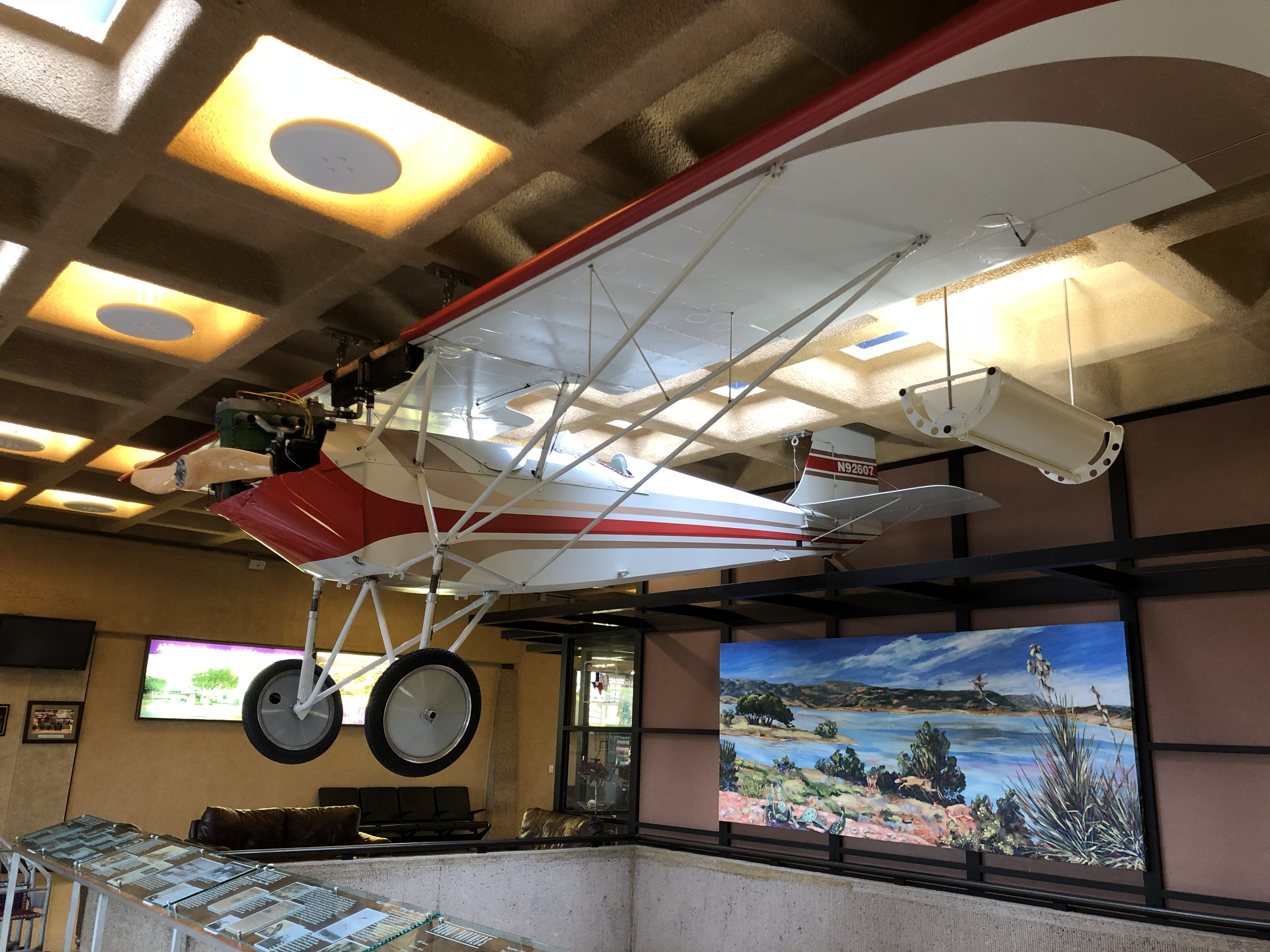
An Alder Derryberry Model A on display at the Abilene Regional Airport

Abilene Regional Airport covers 1,644 acres (665 ha) and has two asphalt runways: 17L/35R 7,198 ft × 150 ft (2,194 m × 46 m), and 17R/35L 7,202 ft × 150 ft (2,195 m × 46 m). In June 1952 it had four runways (045-079-129-180 deg) 3200 to 3684 ft long.

The former runway 4/22 has been decommissioned as of 2023.

The terminal has seen many expansions and improvements in the past [when?] decade. The upper-level houses the airline ticket counters, restaurant, gift shop, airport offices, and two departure gates, each with Jetway boarding bridges. The lower level has two baggage carousels and car-rental agencies.

Recent [when?] improvements include the reconstruction of the airline ramps near the terminal and a new, expanded public parking lot. The new lot has 731 covered parking spaces and escalator access to the upper level.

Construction of the airport's new 130-foot (40 m)-tall control tower began in August 2010 and was completed in January 2012. This new tower replaced a 65-foot (20 m) tower built in 1959.

In the year ending May 31, 2023, the airport had 41,459 aircraft operations, an average of 114 per day: 54% general aviation, 29% military, 14% air taxi and 3% scheduled commercial. 105 aircraft were based at this airport: 79 single-engine, 17 multi-engine, 8 jet and 1 helicopter.

== Airlines and destinations ==
=== Passenger ===
Airlines	Destinations
American Eagle	Dallas/Fort Worth, Phoenix–Sky Harbor
United Express	Denver, Houston–Intercontinental

Destination map
Destination from Abilene Regional Airport

As of December 2022, all American Eagle flights operated by Envoy Air on behalf of American Airlines between Abilene (ABI) and Dallas/Ft. Worth (DFW) were being flown with Embraer E175 regional jets. United Express flights operated on behalf of United Airlines by SkyWest Airlines to Houston and Denver are operated by Bombardier CRJ-200 aircraft.

=== Cargo ===
The following airlines offer scheduled cargo service:

Airlines	Destinations
FedEx Feeder operated by Baron Aviation	Lubbock

== Statistics ==
=== Top Destinations ===
Busiest domestic routes from ABI (May 2025 - April 2026)
Rank	City	Passengers	Carriers
1	Dallas/Fort Worth, Texas	104,200	American
2	Denver, Colorado	2,080	United
3	Houston–Intercontinental, Texas	1,160	United

=== Airline Market Share ===
Largest airlines at ABI (May 2025 - April 2026)
Rank	Airline	Passenger	Market Share
1	Envoy Air	203,000	97.03%
2	SkyWest Airlines	6,220	2.97%
3	Delta Air Lines	10	0.01%

== See also ==
- List of airports in Texas
