= Paducah, Texas =

Town in Cottle County, Texas, United States

- Town
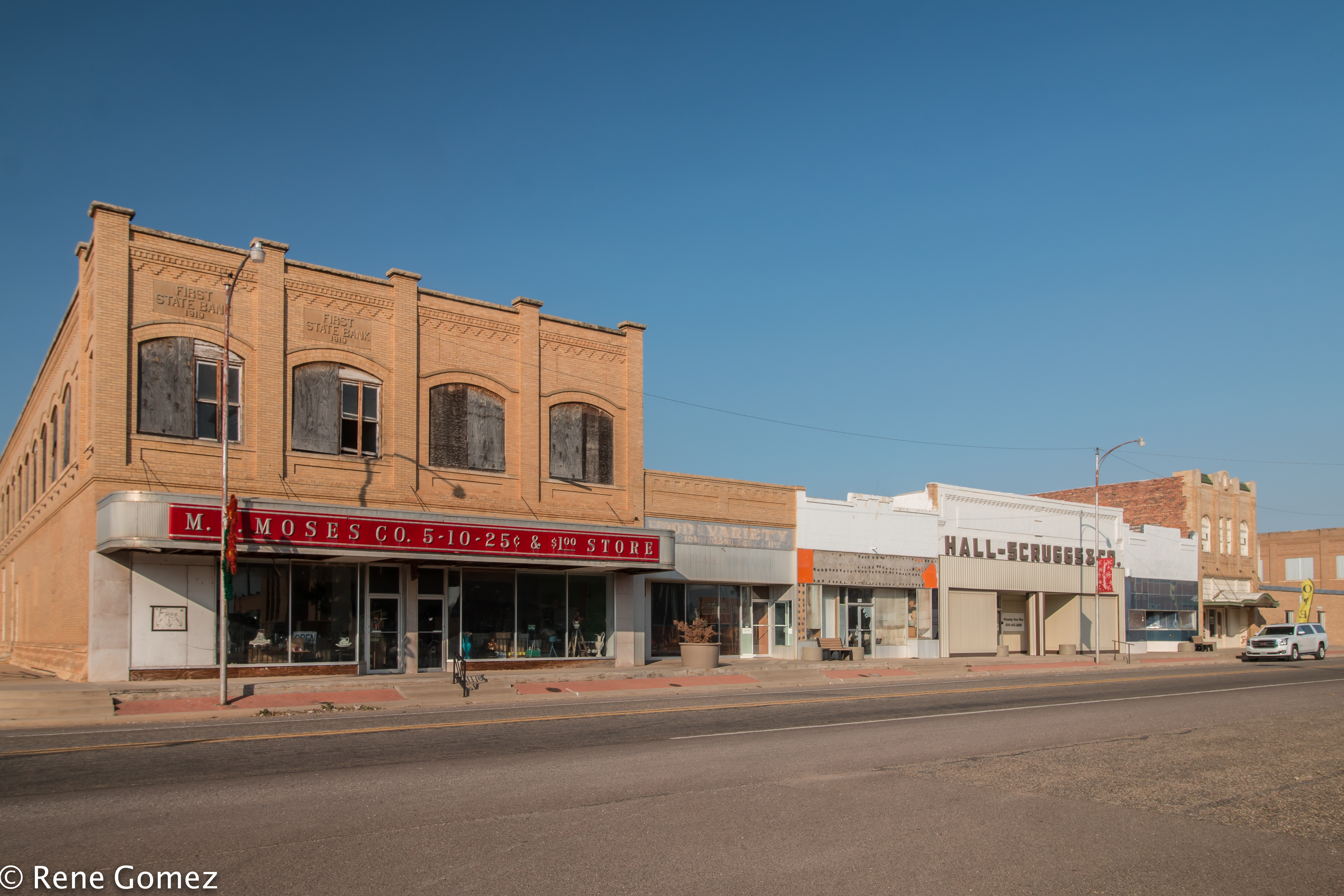
- Downtown Paducah, Texas
- Motto: "Crossroads of America"
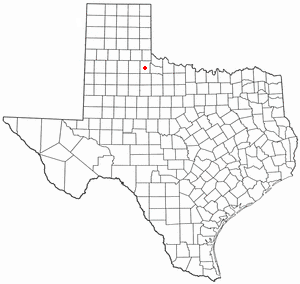
- Location of Paducah, Texas

- Coordinates: 34°00′52″N 100°18′14″W
- Country: United States
- State: Texas
- County: Cottle

Area
  - Total: 1.51 sq mi (3.91 km^{2})
  - Land: 1.51 sq mi (3.90 km^{2})
  - Water: 0.0039 sq mi (0.01 km^{2})
- Elevation: 1,867 ft (569 m)

Population (2020)
  - Total: 1,063
  - Density: 706/sq mi (273/km^{2})
- Time zone: UTC−6 (Central (CST))
  - Summer (DST): UTC−5 (CDT)
- ZIP code: 79248
- Area code: 806
- FIPS code: 48-54600
- GNIS feature ID: 2413098

Paducah is a town in Cottle County, Texas, United States. The population was 1,063 at the 2020 census, down from 1,186 in 2010. It is the county seat of Cottle County. It is just south of the Texas Panhandle and east of the Llano Estacado.

== History ==
The town was named for Paducah, a city in western Kentucky. Richard Potts, a settler from Paducah, Kentucky, offered land to new residents in exchange for voting to name the town Paducah and make it the county seat. Paducah officially became the county seat in 1892 and was incorporated in 1910.

== Demographics ==
=== 2020 census ===
Paducah racial composition (NH = Non-Hispanic) (Note: Note: the US Census treats Hispanic/Latino as an ethnic category. This table excludes Latinos from the racial categories and assigns them to a separate category. Hispanics/Latinos can be of any race.)
Race	Number	Percentage
White (NH)	628	59.08%
Black or African American (NH)	94	8.84%
Native American or Alaska Native (NH)	2	0.19%
Mixed/Multi-Racial (NH)	35	3.29%
Hispanic or Latino	304	28.6%
Total	1,063	

As of the 2020 United States census, there were 1,063 people, 575 households, and 287 families residing in the town.

=== 2000 census ===
Historical population
Census	Pop.	Note	%±
1910	1,350		—
1920	1,357		0.5%
1930	2,802		106.5%
1940	2,677		−4.5%
1950	2,952		10.3%
1960	2,392		−19.0%
1970	2,052		−14.2%
1980	2,216		8.0%
1990	1,788		−19.3%
2000	1,498		−16.2%
2010	1,186		−20.8%
2020	1,063		−10.4%
U.S. Decennial Census

As of the census of 2000, there were 1,498 people, 650 households, and 421 families living in the town. The population density was 985.0 inhabitants per square mile (380.3/km^{2}). There were 820 housing units at an average density of 539.2 per square mile (208.2/km^{2}). The racial makeup of the town was 79.57% White, 11.21% African American, 7.61% from other races, and 1.60% from two or more races. Hispanic or Latino of any race were 20.29% of the population.

There were 650 households, out of which 28.0% had children under the age of 18 living with them, 49.7% were married couples living together, 12.3% had a female householder with no husband present, and 35.1% were non-families. 34.0% of all households were made up of individuals, and 23.5% had someone living alone who was 65 years of age or older. The average household size was 2.25 and the average family size was 2.86.

In the town, the age distribution of the population shows 24.0% under the age of 18, 6.0% from 18 to 24, 20.3% from 25 to 44, 23.0% from 45 to 64, and 26.6% who were 65 years of age or older. The median age was 45 years. For every 100 females, there were 82.2 males. For every 100 females age 18 and over, there were 78.4 males.

The median income for a household in the town was $23,333, and the median income for a family was $30,652. Males had a median income of $26,184 versus $16,131 for females. The per capita income for the town was $15,778. About 15.4% of families and 20.4% of the population were below the poverty line, including 30.0% of those under age 18 and 17.8% of those age 65 or over.

== Geography ==
Paducah is located south of the center of Cottle County. According to the United States Census Bureau, the town has a total area of 1.5 square miles (3.9 km^{2}), all land.

Three U.S. highways intersect in the center of town. U.S. Route 83 leads north 32 miles (51 km) to Childress and south 28 miles (45 km) to Guthrie, while U.S. Route 70 leads east 36 miles (58 km) to Crowell and west 31 miles (50 km) to Matador. U.S. Route 62 follows US 83 north out of town and US 70 to the west.

=== Climate ===
The Köppen climate classification subtype for this climate is BSk (subtropical steppe climate).

Climate data for Paducah, Texas, 1991–2020 normals, extremes 1954–present
Month	Jan	Feb	Mar	Apr	May	Jun	Jul	Aug	Sep	Oct	Nov	Dec	Year
Record high °F (°C)	87 (31)	96 (36)	102 (39)	110 (43)	112 (44)	118 (48)	115 (46)	114 (46)	111 (44)	105 (41)	95 (35)	89 (32)	118 (48)
Mean maximum °F (°C)	78.6 (25.9)	82.7 (28.2)	89.7 (32.1)	96.0 (35.6)	99.6 (37.6)	104.8 (40.4)	106.4 (41.3)	105.7 (40.9)	101.5 (38.6)	98.3 (36.8)	84.5 (29.2)	78.5 (25.8)	109.2 (42.9)
Mean daily maximum °F (°C)	55.1 (12.8)	58.8 (14.9)	67.6 (19.8)	76.5 (24.7)	84.5 (29.2)	92.9 (33.8)	97.2 (36.2)	96.1 (35.6)	87.6 (30.9)	77.4 (25.2)	65.3 (18.5)	55.3 (12.9)	76.2 (24.5)
Daily mean °F (°C)	41.2 (5.1)	44.8 (7.1)	53.2 (11.8)	61.7 (16.5)	70.8 (21.6)	79.5 (26.4)	83.6 (28.7)	82.5 (28.1)	74.3 (23.5)	63.3 (17.4)	51.4 (10.8)	42.0 (5.6)	62.4 (16.9)
Mean daily minimum °F (°C)	27.4 (−2.6)	30.9 (−0.6)	38.8 (3.8)	46.9 (8.3)	57.1 (13.9)	66.1 (18.9)	70.0 (21.1)	68.6 (20.3)	61.1 (16.2)	49.2 (9.6)	37.6 (3.1)	28.7 (−1.8)	48.5 (9.2)
Mean minimum °F (°C)	15.1 (−9.4)	18.6 (−7.4)	23.3 (−4.8)	34.1 (1.2)	44.2 (6.8)	58.3 (14.6)	63.8 (17.7)	62.2 (16.8)	49.3 (9.6)	34.5 (1.4)	23.7 (−4.6)	15.8 (−9.0)	11.0 (−11.7)
Record low °F (°C)	−4 (−20)	−2 (−19)	7 (−14)	24 (−4)	36 (2)	49 (9)	57 (14)	54 (12)	32 (0)	20 (−7)	13 (−11)	−7 (−22)	−7 (−22)
Average precipitation inches (mm)	0.84 (21)	0.88 (22)	1.62 (41)	2.36 (60)	3.32 (84)	3.54 (90)	1.89 (48)	2.20 (56)	2.93 (74)	1.91 (49)	1.35 (34)	1.04 (26)	23.88 (605)
Average snowfall inches (cm)	0.7 (1.8)	1.1 (2.8)	0.2 (0.51)	0.1 (0.25)	0.0 (0.0)	0.0 (0.0)	0.0 (0.0)	0.0 (0.0)	0.0 (0.0)	0.0 (0.0)	0.4 (1.0)	1.1 (2.8)	3.6 (9.16)
Average precipitation days (≥ 0.01 in)	3.1	2.8	3.9	4.3	7.0	6.2	4.7	5.2	5.5	4.5	3.1	3.1	53.4
Average snowy days (≥ 0.1 in)	0.5	0.5	0.2	0.0	0.0	0.0	0.0	0.0	0.0	0.0	0.2	0.8	2.2
Source 1: NOAA
Source 2: National Weather Service

== Government ==
Republican David Spiller, an attorney from Jacksboro in Jack County, has since March 2021 represented Paducah and Cottle County in the Texas House of Representatives.

== Education ==
The town is served by the Paducah Independent School District and is home to the Paducah High School Dragons.

== Notable people ==
- William S. "Bill" Heatly, a Democratic member of the Texas House of Representatives from 1955 to 1983, was known as the "Duke of Paducah".
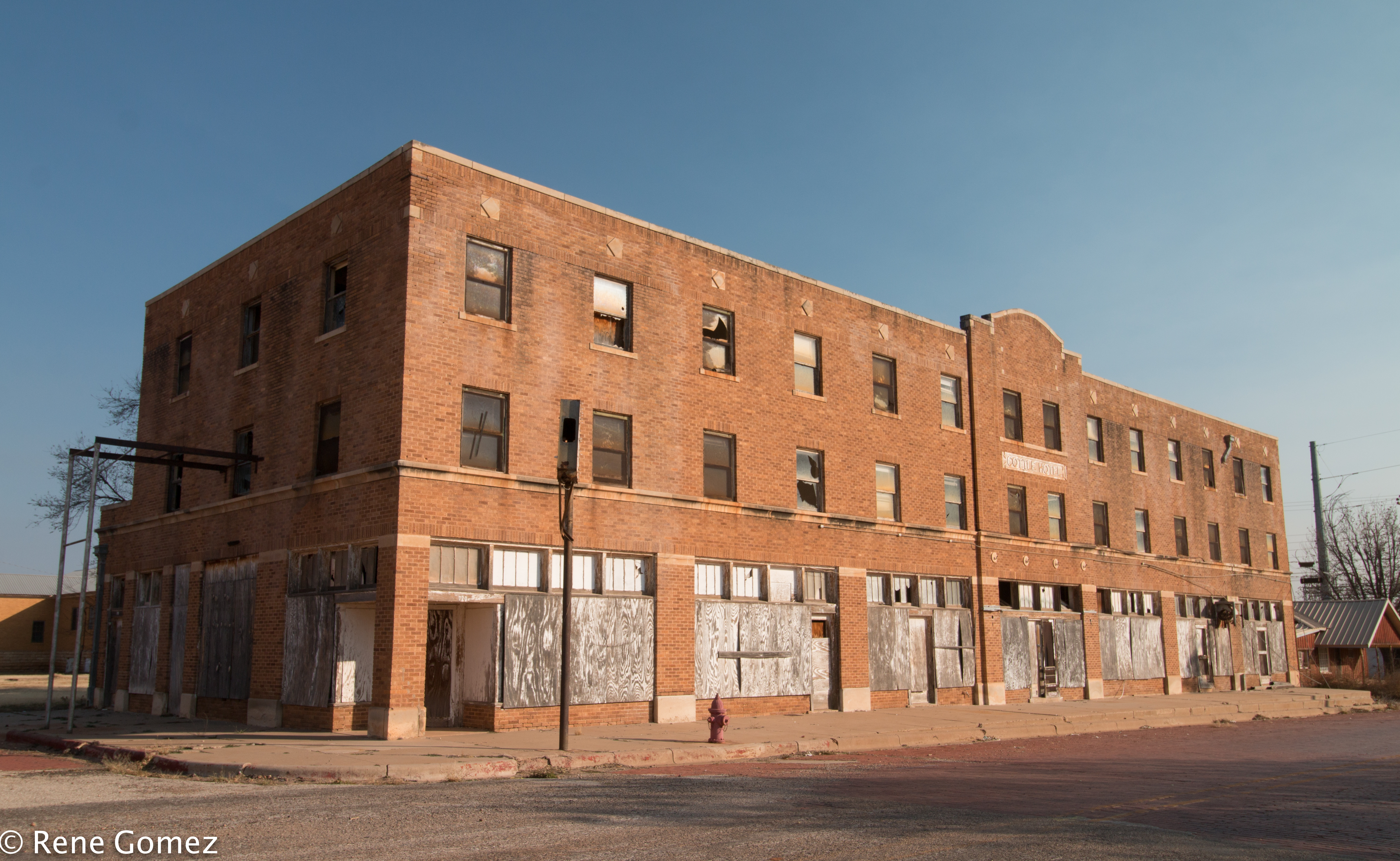
Cottle Hotel

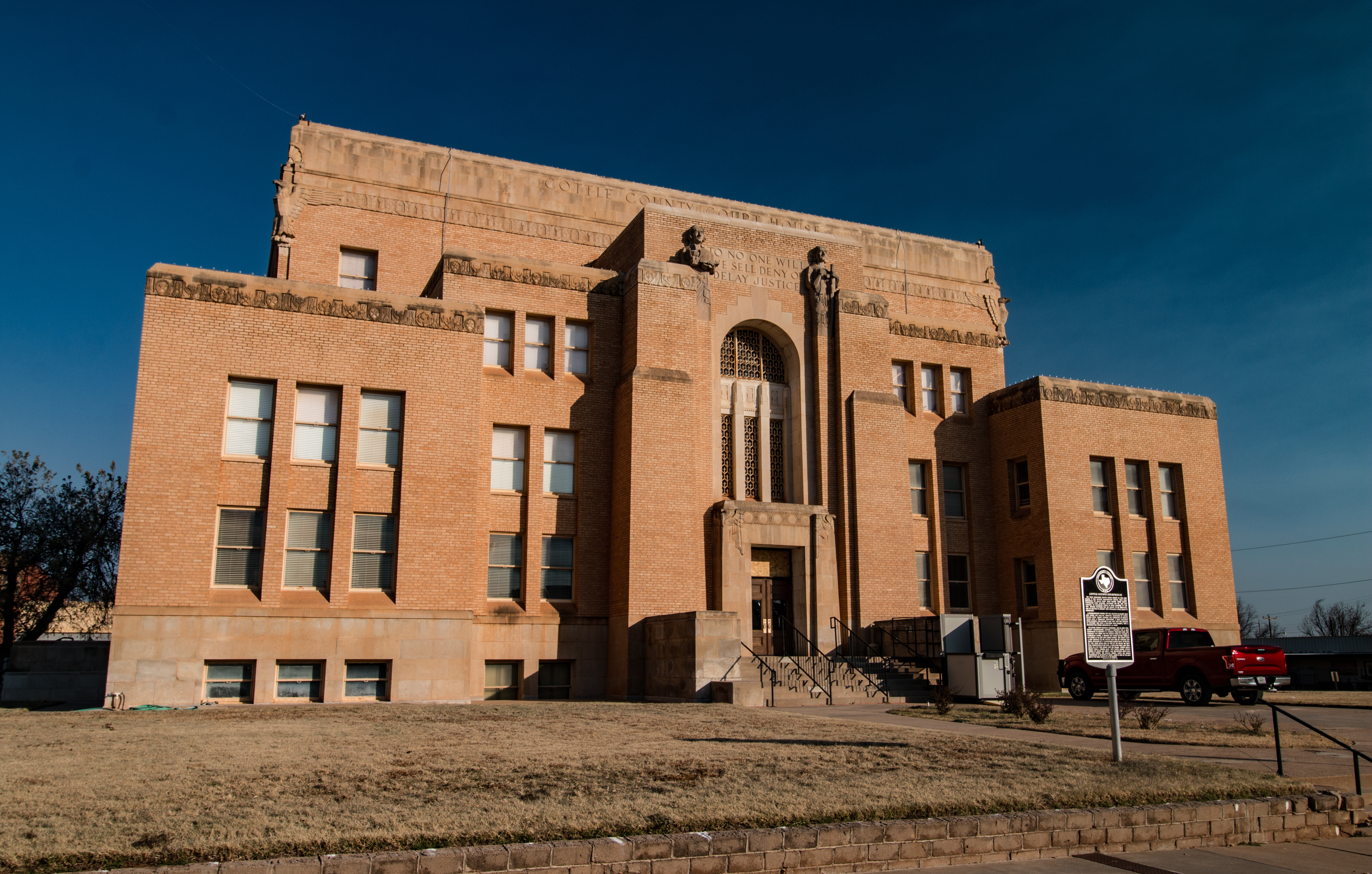
Cottle County Courthouse

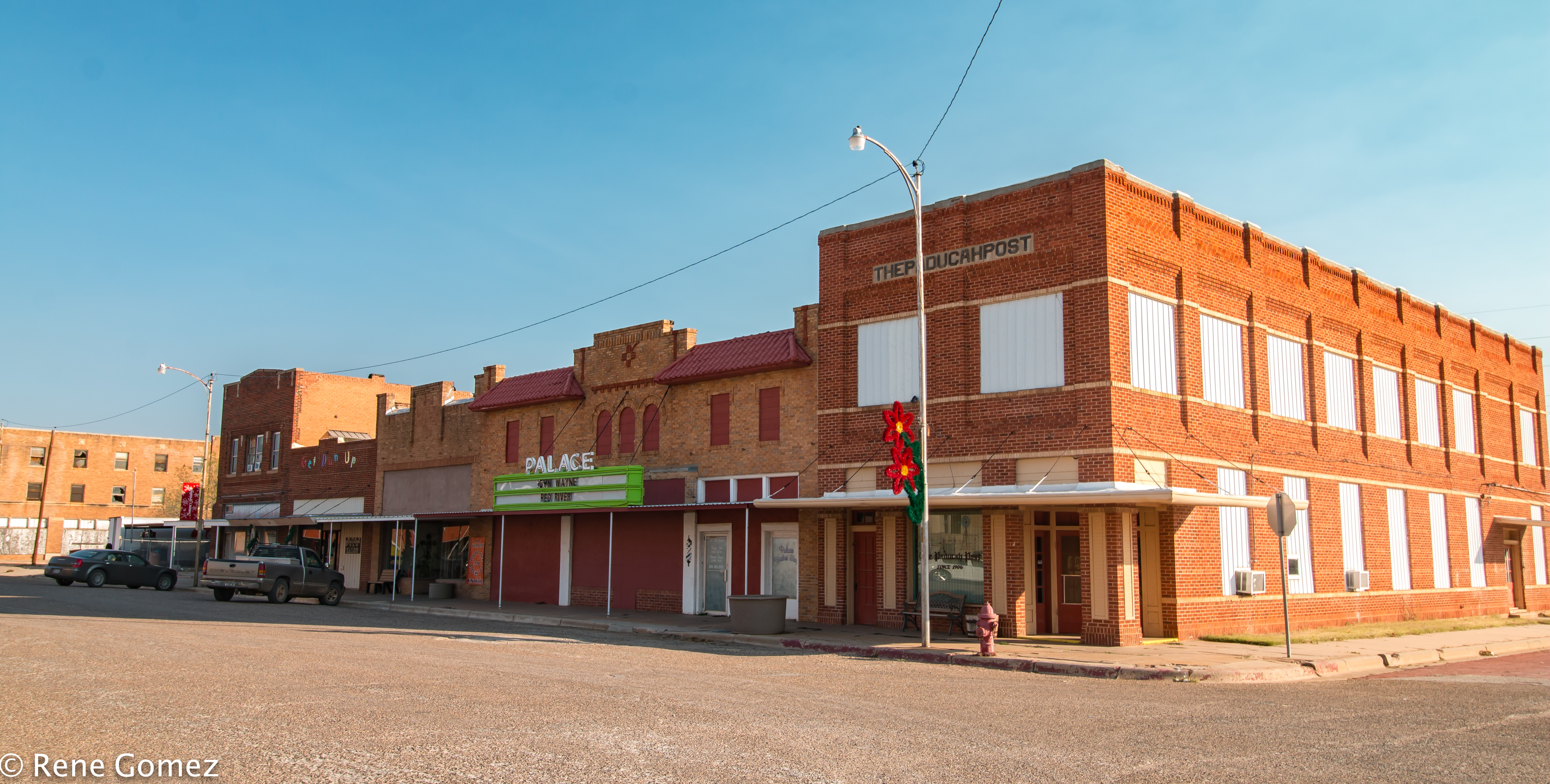
Buildings in Paducah, Texas

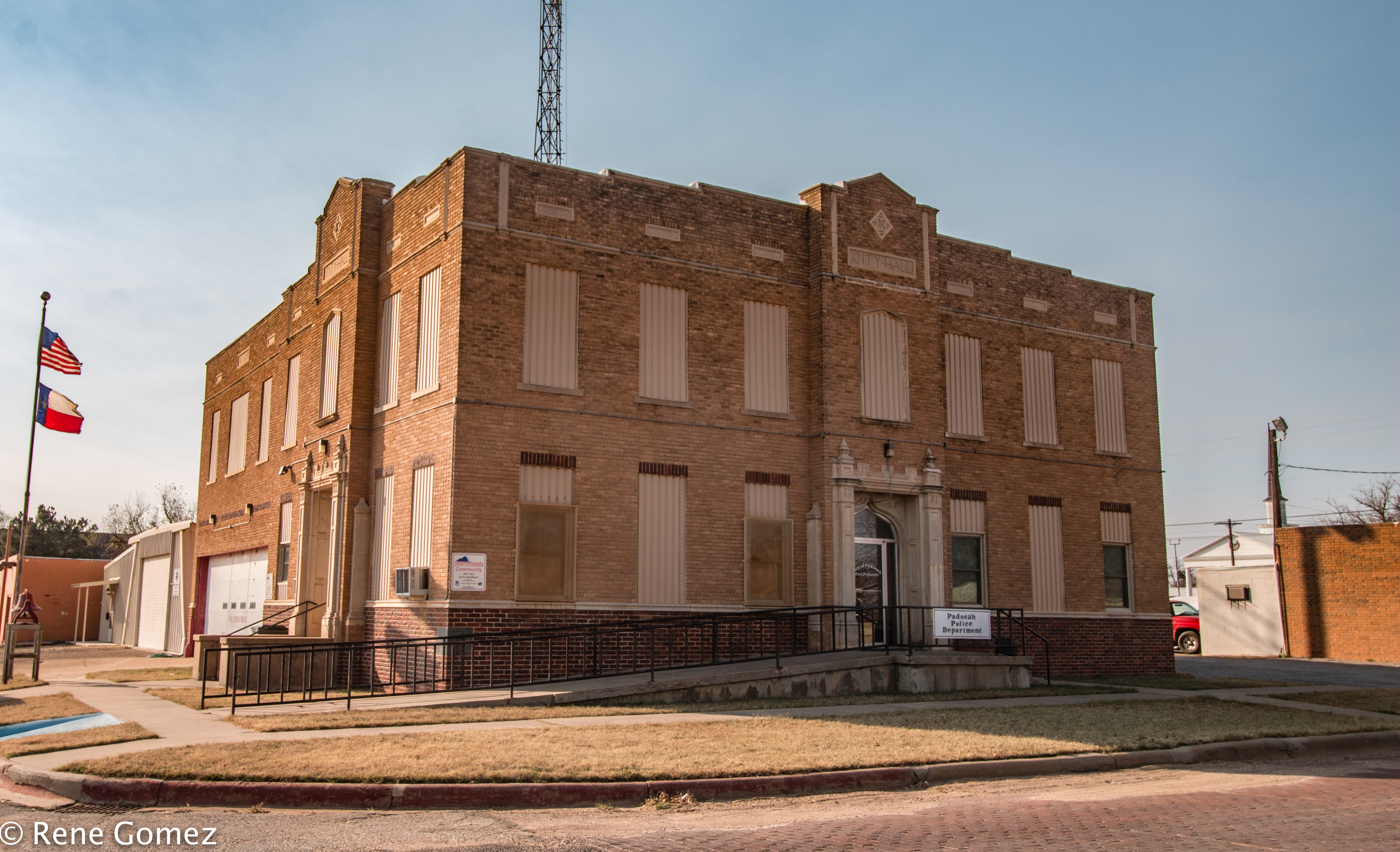
City Hall

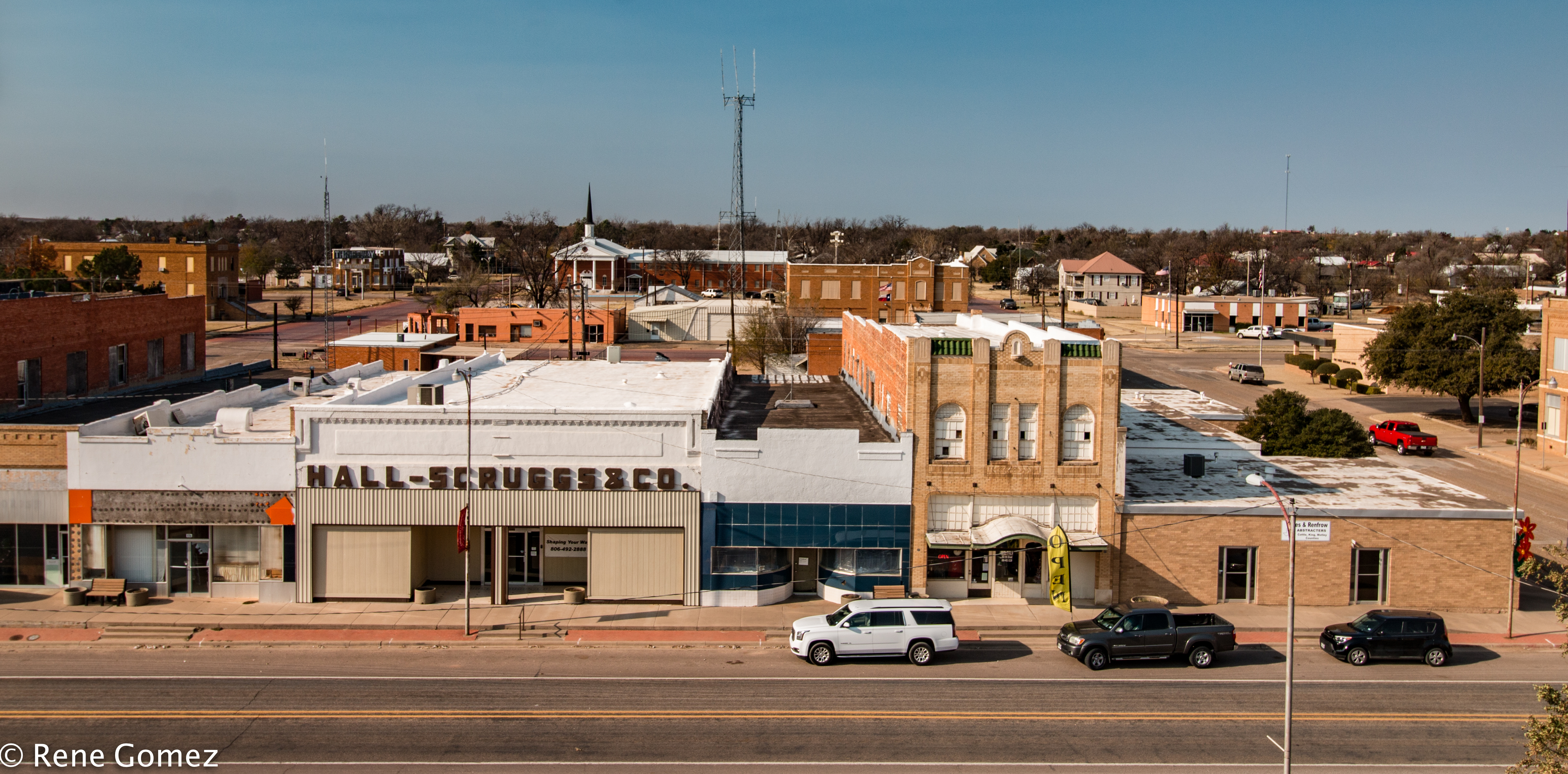
Downtown Paducah

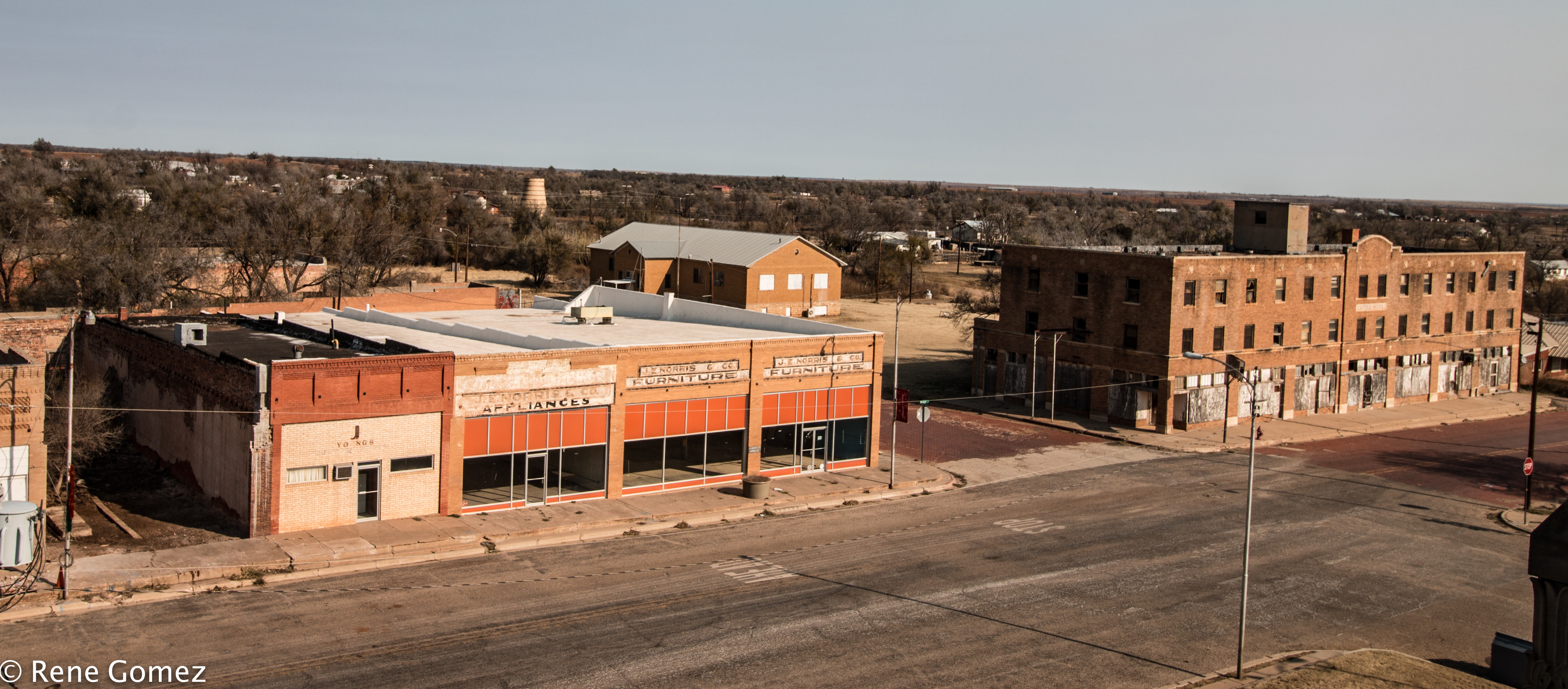
Downtown Paducah

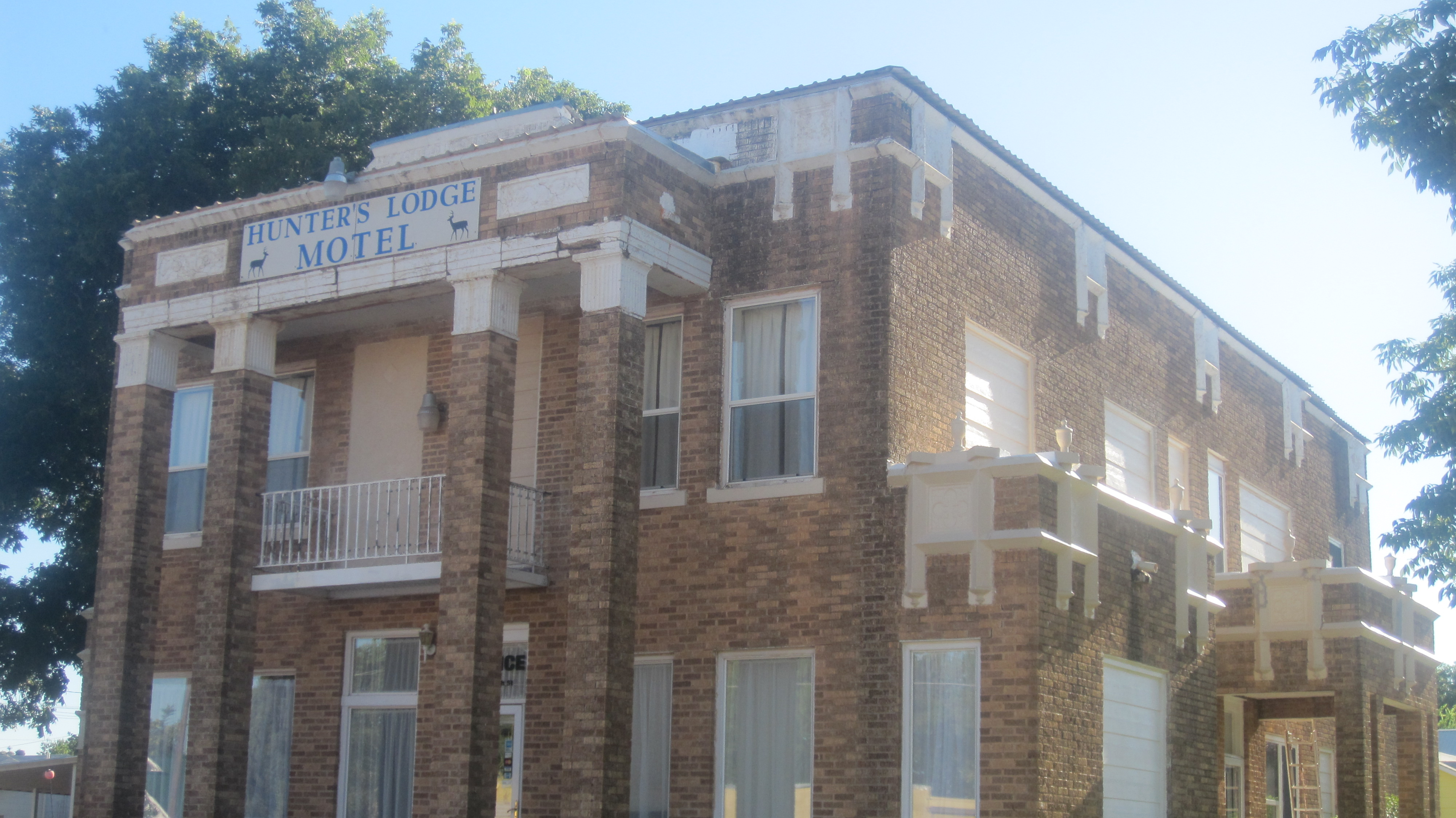
Hunters Lodge Motel in Paducah

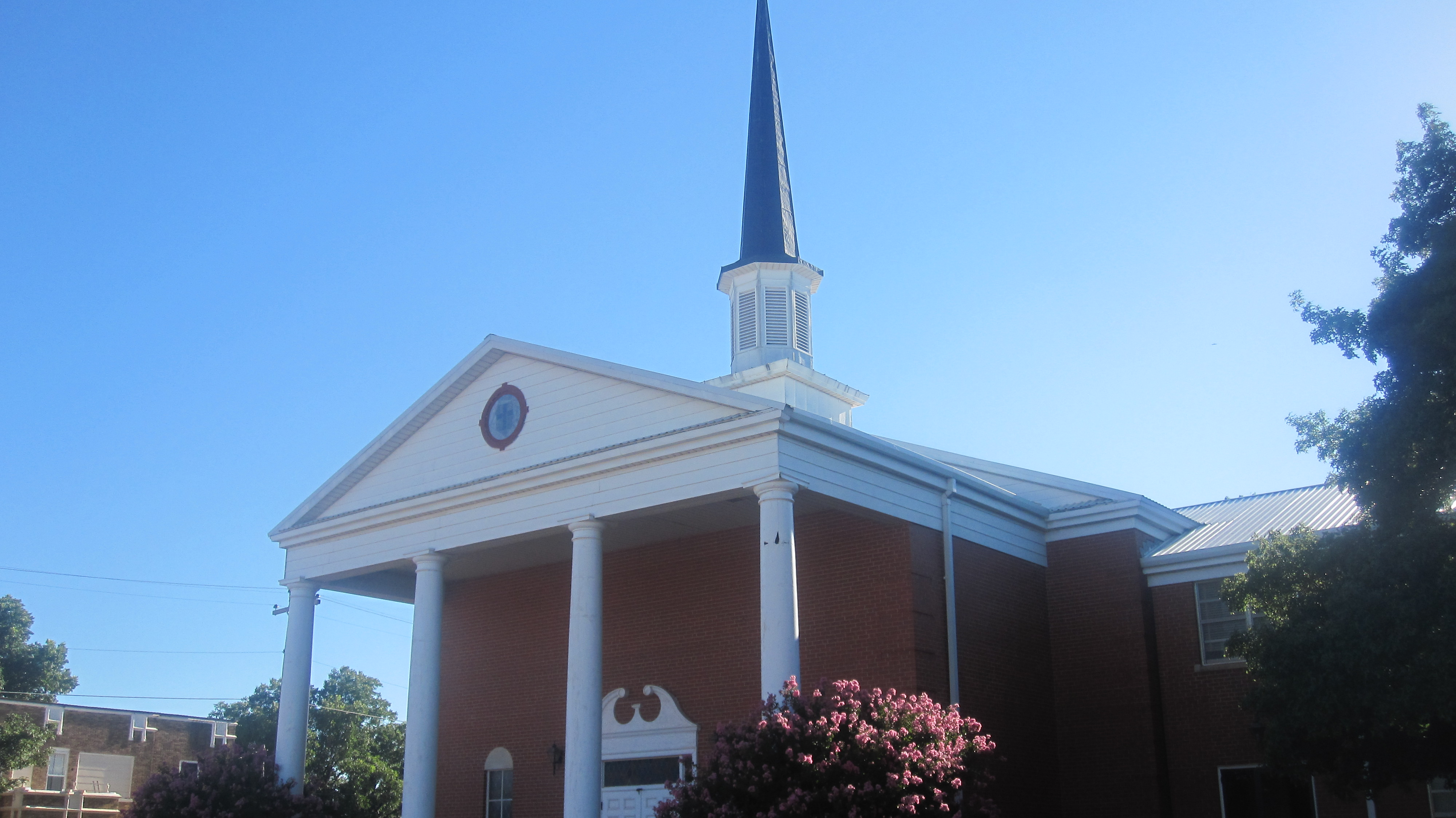
First Baptist Church of Paducah

== See also ==
- List of municipalities in Texas
