= Paducah Independent School District =

School district in Texas

Coordinates: 34.013957°N 100.30378°W

Paducah Independent School District is a public school district based in Paducah, Texas (USA).

The district has one school Paducah High School that serves students in grades kindergarten through twelve.

In 2009, the school district was rated "academically acceptable" by the Texas Education Agency.
