= Follett =

Follett may refer to:

== Places ==
- County of Follett, Australia
- Electoral district of Normanby, Dundas and Follett, one of the 16 original electoral districts of Victoria
- Follett, Texas
- Follett High School, in Follett, Texas
- Follett Independent School District, in Follett, Texas
- Follett Stone Arch Bridge Historic District, in Vermont
- Folletts, Iowa

== Corporations ==
- Follett Corporation, a company that provides educational products to schools, colleges, and libraries
- Follett Ice, a company that manufactures ice and beverage equipment, and refrigerators and freezers

== People ==
- A. Follett Osler (1808–1903), British meteorologist
- Barbara Follett (politician) (born 1942), English politician
- Barbara Newhall Follett (1914–1939), American novelist
- Brent Follett (1810–1887), British politician
- Brian Follett (born 1939), British government official
- Burley Follett (1806–1877), mayor of Green Bay, Wisconsin
- David Follett (1907–1982), director of the London Science Museum
- David Follett (cricketer) (born 1968), English cricketer
- Follett Johnson (1843–1909), American soldier and Medal of Honor recipient
- Follett Thomas (1863–1942), Australian politician
- Frederick Follett (1804–1891), American newspaper editor and politician
- James Follett (1939–2021), English author/screenwriter
- John F. Follett (1831–1902), American politician
- Joseph L. Follett (1843–1907), American soldier and Medal of Honor recipient
- Ken Follett (born 1949), Welsh novelist
- King Follett (1788–1844), an early Mormon elder
- Martin Dewey Follett (1826–1911), American politician
- Mary Parker Follett (1868–1933), American management and political theorist
- Rosemary Follett (born 1948), Australian politician
- William Webb Follett (1796–1845), English politician
- Wilson Follett (1887–1963), author of Modern American Usage
- Zack Follett (born 1987), American football player

== See also ==
- Follett House, a historic house in Vermont
- Follett v. Town of McCormick, an American Supreme Court decision
- King Follett discourse, an address delivered by LDS founder Joseph Smith
