= Texas State Highway 15 =

Highway in Texas

State Highway 15

Route information
- Maintained by TxDOT
- Length: 125.369 mi (201.762 km)
- Existed: 1954–present

Major junctions
- West end: US 54 at Stratford
- US 83 in Perryton
- East end: SH-15 east of Follett

Location
- Country: United States
- State: Texas

Highway system
- Highways in Texas; Interstate; US; State; Former; Toll; Loops; Spurs; FM/RM; Park; Rec
← PR 14	→ Loop 15

State Highway 15 (SH 15) is a state highway in the U.S. state of Texas. It runs from the Oklahoma state line 6 miles (9.7 km) east of Follett to US 287 in Stratford.

== Route description ==
SH 15 begins at an intersection with US 287 in Stratford. It travels eastward through the far northern reaches of the Texas Panhandle, mainly through farmlands. The route passes through the towns of Spearman and Perryton, before exiting eastward into Northwest Oklahoma, where the road transitions to Oklahoma State Highway 15.

== History ==
On October 26, 1954, SH 117 was redesignated as SH 15 for its entire route from the Texas/Oklahoma state line in Lipscomb County through the northeast Panhandle to an intersection with U.S. Highway 287 at Claude. The route was renumbered to correspond to the connecting Oklahoma State Highway 15. On September 1, 1965, the section from Spearman southward was redesignated as SH 207, while SH 15 was rerouted westward to Stratford over cancelled routes SH 282 and FM 289.

=== Previous route ===
Historic SH 15

SH 15 was one of the original twenty five state highways proposed on June 21, 1917, overlaid on top of the Dallas-Louisiana Highway. From 1917 the routing mostly followed present day U.S. Highway 80 from Dallas to Wills Point. It continued on, routed along present day SH 64 from Wills Point into Tyler and up U.S. Highway 271 into Gladewater, and east along US 80 into Longview. On June 17, 1918, the section of SH 15 from Gladewater to Longview was transferred to SH 11. On January 21, 1919, an alternate route of SH 15 was designated east of Wills Point, going through Mineola to Gladewater, via US 80.

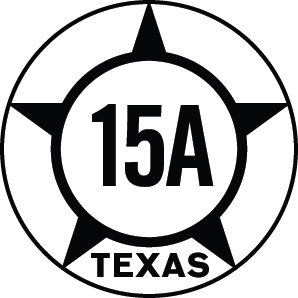
Historic SH 15A

On November 27, 1922, the section of SH 15 from Wills Point to Tyler was redesignated as SH 15A, which extended to Carthage. The section of SH 15 from Tyler to Gladewater was transferred to an extended SH 31. On August 21, 1923, SH 15A was renumbered as SH 64. On October 26, 1925, SH 15A was designated from Gladewater to Kilgore. On March 19, 1930, this became part of SH 135. On September 18, 1929, another SH 15A was designated along the Scyene Road from SH 15 to SH 14. This highway was erroneously omitted on the March 19, 1930 log, so was unnumbered that day. On November 30, 1932, the former SH 15A was added to the state highway log, but was renumbered as SH 183.

SH 15 was extended east to the Louisiana state line on August 21, 1923, replacing a section of SH 11. In 1926, U.S. Highway 80 was routed over SH 15. The routes were marked concurrently. On December 16, 1929, SH 15 was extended west to Fort Worth. On June 24, 1931, this extension to Fort Worth was cancelled. On September 11, 1934, SH 15 was extended west back to Fort Worth. On August 8, 1935, SH 15 was extended west via Albany via Seminole to the New Mexico state line, replacing SH 83 and part of SH 1A, though this was not effective until September 1, 1935. On September 26, 1939, the section of SH 15 east of Albany was deleted (already part of US 80 and US 80 Alternate). The remainder of SH 15 was redesignated as US 180 on September 6, 1943.

== Major intersections ==
County	Location	mi	km	Destinations	Notes
Sherman	Stratford	0.00	0.00	US 287 – Dumas, Boise City	
Sherman		6.40	10.30	FM 2232 south	
Sherman		13.70	22.05	FM 119	
Sherman		17.78	28.61	FM 1290 north	
Hansford		27.75	44.66	FM 1573 west	
Hansford		32.96	53.04	FM 1262 north	
Hansford	Gruver	38.94	62.67	SH 136 north	west end of SH 136 overlap
Hansford	Gruver	39.07	62.88	SH 136 south (Main Avenue) / FM 278 east	east end of SH 136 overlap
Hansford	Gruver	39.83	64.10	Loop 84 west	
Hansford		43.52	70.04	SH 207 north	west end of SH 207 overlap
Hansford		45.29	72.89	FM 2018 west	
Hansford		50.33	81.00	FM 2387 north	
Hansford	Spearman	52.33	84.22	FM 760 north – Lake Palo Duro, Airport	west end of FM 760 overlap
Hansford	Spearman	52.41	84.35	SH 207 south – Stinnett	east end of SH 207 overlap; access to Hansford Hospital
Hansford	Spearman	52.43	84.38	FM 759 east / FM 760 south	east end of FM 760 overlap
Ochiltree		65.70	105.73	FM 1267 east	
Ochiltree	Farnsworth	67.99	109.42	FM 376 south	
Ochiltree		75.48	121.47	Spur 192 east	
Ochiltree	Perryton	77.00	123.92	Loop 143	
Ochiltree	Perryton	78.63	126.54	US 83 (Main Street) – Liberal, Canadian	
Ochiltree	Perryton	79.84	128.49	Loop 143	
Lipscomb	Booker	94.69	152.39	SH 23 – Beaver, Canadian	
Lipscomb	Darrouzett	106.3	171.1	FM 2172 south (Main Street)	
Lipscomb		106.9	172.0	RM 2248 north	
Lipscomb		109.3	175.9	SH 305 south – Lipscomb	
Lipscomb		112.3	180.7	FM 1455 south	
Lipscomb	Follett	116.2	187.0	FM 2741 north	west end of FM 2741 overlap
Lipscomb	Follett	116.8	188.0	FM 2741 south (South Main Street)	east end of FM 2741 overlap
Lipscomb	Follett	117.4	188.9	FM 1454 south – Higgins	west end of FM 1454 overlap
Lipscomb		118.2	190.2	FM 1454 north	east end of FM 1454 overlap
Lipscomb		125.4	201.8	SH-15 east – Shattuck	Oklahoma state line
1.000 mi = 1.609 km; 1.000 km = 0.621 mi
