= Texas State Highway 213 =

Highway in Texas

State Highway 213
- SH 213, highlighted in red

Route information
- Maintained by TxDOT
- Length: 15.293 mi (24.612 km)
- Existed: by 1935–present

Major junctions
- West end: SH 305 near Lipscomb
- East end: US 60 / FM 1453 in Higgins

Location
- Country: United States
- State: Texas

Highway system
- Highways in Texas; Interstate; US; State; Former; Toll; Loops; Spurs; FM/RM; Park; Rec
← SH 212	→ I-214

State Highway 213 (SH 213) is a short state highway running from SH 305 near Lipscomb to US 60/FM 1453 in Higgins in the eastern Texas Panhandle.

== History ==
The route was conditionally designated along its current route on September 11, 1934, but had yet to be constructed by 1938. On September 1, 1988, the section concurrent with SH 305 to Spur 188 was cancelled.

== Junction list ==
The entire route is in Lipscomb County.

Location	mi	km	Destinations	Notes
	0.0	0.0	SH 305	Western terminus
	8.0	12.9	FM 1454 north	
Higgins	15.2	24.5	US 60 / FM 1453 south – Arnett, Canadian	Eastern terminus
1.000 mi = 1.609 km; 1.000 km = 0.621 mi
