= Texas State Highway 23 =

State highway in Lipscomb County, Texas, United States

State Highway 23

Route information
- Maintained by TxDOT
- Length: 28.704 mi (46.195 km)
- Existed: August 29, 1990 (signed on January 25, 1959)–present
- History: 1959 FM 1265 signed as SH 23; 1990: FM 1265 officially designated SH 23

Major junctions
- South end: US 83 northwest of Canadian
- SH 15 in Booker
- North end: SH-23 at the Oklahoma state line near Booker

Location
- Country: United States
- State: Texas
- Counties: Lipscomb

Highway system
- Highways in Texas; Interstate; US; State; Former; Toll; Loops; Spurs; FM/RM; Park; Rec
← SH 22	→ SH 24

State Highway 23 (SH 23) is a state highway in Lipscomb County, Texas, United States, in the Texas Panhandle, that connects U.S. Route 83 (US 83) (northwest of Canadian) with Oklahoma State Highway 23 (OK SH 23) at the Oklahoma state line. The highway's route designation is numerically continuous with subsequent routes in Oklahoma and Kansas and, together with OK SH 23 and Kansas Highway 23, forms part of a single route from US 83 in Texas to US 83 near Selden, Kansas.

The route number was one of the original highways proposed by the state highway department on April 4, 1917, and was used over various shifting alignments in central and north central Texas in the 1920s and 1930s. The current highway was originally built as part of Texas' system of Farm to Market Roads on July 14, 1949. The state began signing the route as SH 23 on January 27, 1959, although the highway officially retained its Farm to Market designation until August 29, 1990. SH 23 intersects one other state highway, SH 15, at Booker.

== Route description ==
SH 23 begins at its southern terminus at US 83 in southwestern Lipscomb County northwest of Canadian. The 28.7-mile (46.2 km) highway intersects RM 3260 branching off to the east toward Lipscomb, and then in the northeastern portion of the county FM 377 branches off to the west toward Perryton. In Booker, the only town along the highway, SH 23 intersects SH 15. The highway then proceeds to the north crossing the Oklahoma state line into Beaver County, Oklahoma south of Elmwood, Oklahoma. The highway becomes OK 23 at the state line.

The highway encounters mostly modest hills for most of its route allowing the highway to generally follow long, straight stretches before emerging onto a flat plain south of Booker to the state line.

== History ==
=== Former routes ===
SH 23 was one of the original 25 state highways proposed on June 21, 1917, with a route from Laredo to Wichita Falls along the Southwest Trail. It was concurrent with SH 22 north of Olney, and with SH 9 and SH 2 south of Brady. The north end was relocated to Seymour on February 19, 1923. On August 21, 1923, the section from Brady to Coleman was cancelled, and the sections concurrent with other highways south of Brady had their SH 23 designation dropped. SH 23 replaced part of SH 7A to Ballinger, and replaced part of SH 30 to Menard. On November 19, 1923, SH 23 was extended south to Junction. On May 25, 1925, the route was extended northward to Vernon. On March 18, 1929, the route was extended northward to the Oklahoma state line. The route was shortened on August 6, 1929 (effective September 1, 1929) with its southern terminus moved northward to Ballinger, as south of there was transferred to SH 4. The route followed US 67 between Ballinger and Coleman, and US 283 from Rising Star to its new northern terminus where US 283 crossed the Red River toward Altus, Oklahoma. On July 13, 1934, the route was redirected further south along US 283 to Brownwood and then via Brady to Menard, replacing SH 129 from Rising Star to Brownwood, and part of SH 10 south of Brownwood. The section from Ballinger to Coleman was transferred to SH 10, while the section from Coleman to Rising Star was renumbered SH 206. On July 15, 1935, the section from Brady to Menard was cancelled as it was never built. On September 26, 1939, the route had been decommissioned, being absorbed by US 283 (current US 377, US 183, SH 6, and US 283).

Historic SH 23A

SH 23A was an alternate route of SH 23 between Albany and Cross Plains created on April 20, 1920 The alternate route was the eastern path through Cisco while the main route was the western path through Baird. On August 21, 1923, the western route was cancelled as it was never built, and the eastern route had been reassigned as the main route of SH 23. On February 17, 1925, SH 23A was designated from Cross Plains to Moran. SH 23A was removed on July 28, 1926.

=== Current route ===
The current route was originally designated Farm to Market Road 1265 on July 14, 1949. That road began as a 5.7-mile (9.2 km) route extending southward from the state line through Booker. That route, along with what was then SH 117 passing through Booker connected two discontinuous portions of OK 15. FM 377 was extended to FM 1265 connecting the road to Perryton on October 26, 1954, while FM 1265 was extended an additional 12.0 miles (19.3 km) southward. The connecting route SH 117 at Booker was renamed SH 15 in 1955 matching the numbering of its adjoining Oklahoma route. FM 1265 was completed on January 21, 1956 when it was extended the remaining distance to US 83.

In 1959, the portion of OK 15 between Texas and Kansas was renamed OK 23 conforming with the connecting Kansas highway. On January 25, 1959, TxDOT began signing FM 1265 as SH 23, although the road officially retained the FM 1265 designation. RM 3260 was branched off in 1972 and completed in 1978 connecting the highway to Lipscomb. On August 29, 1990, the highway was officially designated SH 23, and FM 1265 was decommissioned.

== Major intersections ==
The entire route is in Lipscomb County.

Location	mi	km	Destinations	Notes
	0	0.0	US 83 – Canadian, Perryton	Southern terminus
	8.0	12.9	RM 3260 – Lipscomb	
	21.1	34.0	FM 377 – Perryton	
Booker	25.6	41.2	SH 15 – Perryton, Darrouzett	
	28.7	46.2	SH-23 – Elmwood, OK	Northern terminus; roadway continues into Beaver County, Oklahoma as OK 23
1.000 mi = 1.609 km; 1.000 km = 0.621 mi

== See also ==
- List of state highways in Texas
