= Booker High School =

Booker High School may refer to:

- Booker High School (Florida) — Sarasota, Florida
- Booker High School (Texas) — Booker, Texas
- Booker T. Crenshaw Christian School — San Diego, California

== See also ==
- Booker T. Washington High School (disambiguation)
