= Follett High School =

Location
- 205 E Ivanhoe Ave; Follett, Texas 79034; United States
- Coordinates: 36.4343°N 100.1397°W

Information
- School type: Public high school
- School district: Follett Independent School District
- Principal: George Auld
- Teaching staff: 21.20 (on an FTE basis)
- Grades: PK-12
- Enrollment: 173 (2023-24)
- Student to teacher ratio: 8.16
- Colors: Black & Gold
- Athletics conference: UIL Class A
- Mascot: Panther
- Yearbook: Panther
- Website: Follett High School

Follett High School or Follett School is a public high school located in the town of Follett, Texas, USA and classified as a 1A school by the UIL. It is a part of the Follett Independent School District located in northeastern Lipscomb County. In 2015, the school was rated "Met Standard" by the Texas Education Agency.

== Athletics ==
The Follett Panthers compete in these sports -

6-Man Football, Basketball, Track, Baseball & Softball

=== State titles ===
- Football -
  - 1974(8M)^
- Girls Basketball -
  - 1970(B), 2008(1A/D2)

^Eight man football was played for a few years in the 1970s.

==== State finalist ====
- Football -
  - 1975(8M), 2008(6M/D1), 2012(6M/D2)

== Theater ==
- One Act Play
  - 2001(1A)
