= Texas State Highway 305 =

State highway in Texas

State Highway 305
- SH 305, highlighted in red

Route information
- Maintained by TxDOT
- Length: 29.408 mi (47.328 km)
- Existed: 1938–present

Major junctions
- South end: US 60 / RM 2758 in Glazier
- North end: SH 15 near Darrouzett

Location
- Country: United States
- State: Texas

Highway system
- Highways in Texas; Interstate; US; State; Former; Toll; Loops; Spurs; FM/RM; Park; Rec
← SH 304	→ SH 306

State Highway 305 (SH 305) is a Texas state highway that runs from just east of Darrouzett south to Glazier in the far northeastern Texas Panhandle. This route was designated in 1938.

== Route description ==
SH 305 begins at a junction with US 60 and FM 2758. It heads north from this junction to an intersection with SH 213. The highway continues to the north to an intersection with FM 1920. Heading towards the north, the highway continues to an intersection Spur 108 in Lipscomb. The highway continues to the north to an intersection with FM 2172. SH 305 reaches its northern terminus at SH 15.

== History ==
SH 305 was designated on December 1, 1938, in its general present location. The number was not assigned until January 23, 1939. The highway was lengthened on September 1, 1988, due to the removal of the concurrency with SH 213.

== Junction list ==
County	Location	mi	km	Destinations	Notes
Hemphill	Glazier	0.0	0.0	US 60 / RM 2758 east	
Lipscomb		11.3	18.2	SH 213 east	
Lipscomb		13.3	21.4	FM 1920 south	
Lipscomb	Lipscomb	15.5	24.9	Spur 108 east	
Lipscomb		24.3	39.1	FM 2172 north	
Lipscomb		29.4	47.3	SH 15 – Darrouzett, Follett	
1.000 mi = 1.609 km; 1.000 km = 0.621 mi
