= Abner Smith Lipscomb =

American judge (1789–1856)

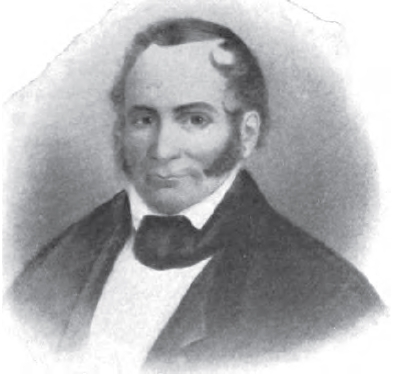
Abner S. Lipscomb

Abner Smith Lipscomb (February 10, 1789, in Abbeville District, South Carolina – December 8, 1856, in Austin, Texas) was an American and Texan lawyer and judge. He was also appointed Secretary of State for the Republic of Texas under the administration of President Mirabeau B. Lamar.

Lipscomb studied law in the office of John C. Calhoun and passed the bar in 1810. In 1811, he began practice in St. Stephens, Alabama (then part of the Mississippi Territory.) In 1813, Lipscomb served in the territorial militia during the Creek War and fought at the Battle of Burnt Corn. He served in the Alabama territorial legislature in 1818 and when Alabama became a state in 1819, he then became a circuit judge, which automatically made him a justice of the Alabama Supreme Court. When chief justice Clement Clay of the Alabama Supreme Court resigned in 1823, Lipscomb was chosen to be the next chief justice. The court was reorganized in 1832; Lipscomb continued as chief justice of the court, where he served until 1835. Lipscomb served a term in the Alabama state legislature in 1838.

He married on April 13, 1813, at St. Stephens to Elizabeth Gaines, sister of Ann Lawrence Gaines who married their cousin, Col. George Strother Gaines. Col. Gaines' nephew, Hon. Francis Strother Lyon began the study of law while working for Abner Smith Lipscomb in his office in St. Stephens.

In 1839 Lipscomb moved to the Republic of Texas and established a law practice in Brenham. He was Secretary of State under President Lamar from January 31, 1840, to December 13, 1840. Lipscomb was a member of the Convention of 1845; in 1845, he also served on a committee that wrote a report on the Texas General Land Office. He was appointed an associate justice of the Texas Supreme Court in 1846 by Governor James Pinckney Henderson. As he was elected in 1851 and re-elected in 1856, he continued in this post until November 1856. He taught Law courses at Baylor University from 1849 to 1856.

Lipscomb died in Austin, Texas and was buried in the State Cemetery. Lipscomb County, Texas and its county seat of Lipscomb, Texas, are named in honor of him. The remainder of the Lipscomb Family lives in Houston Texas, the patriarch of the Lipscomb clan, Charles Marty Lipscomb, lives in Edinburg Texas with his wife JP Lipscomb and his three children.

Legal offices
Preceded by Clement Comer Clay	Chief Justice of the Supreme Court of Alabama; 1823–1834	Succeeded by Reuben Saffold
