= Brent Guy =

American football player and coach (born 1960)

Biographical details
- Born: September 5, 1960 (age 66); Perryton, Texas, U.S.

Playing career
- 1979–1982: Oklahoma State
- Positions: Defensive end, linebacker

Coaching career (HC unless noted)
- 1986–1987: Oklahoma State (GA)
- 1988: Oklahoma State (RC)
- 1989–1991: Oklahoma State (LB)
- 1992–1994: Utah State (LB)
- 1995–1997: Oklahoma State (LB)
- 1998–2000: Boise State (DC)
- 2001–2004: Arizona State (DC)
- 2005–2008: Utah State
- 2009: Louisville (DC/LB)
- 2010: UNLV (LB)
- 2011–2014: Tulsa (DC/LB)
- 2015: Memphis (S)
- 2017–2018: FIU (DC)

Head coaching record
- Overall: 9–38

Brent Guy (born September 5, 1960) is an American college football coach and former player. Guy served as the defensive coordinator for Florida International University. Guy also served as head football coach at Utah State University from 2005 to 2008, compiling an overall record of nine wins and 38 losses.

== Playing career ==
Guy graduated from Booker High School in Booker, Texas and attended Oklahoma State University, where he was a defensive end and linebacker before graduating with a degree in Hotel and Restaurant Administration. He played on the Independence Bowl team that still holds the school record for total defense (giving up 268 yards per game). Guy finished his playing career with 177 tackles, he was credited with 103 his senior season. "Tales from Oklahoma State Football" by Pat Jones and Jimmie Tramel chronicled Guy's playing and coaching career.

== Coaching career ==
Guy began his coaching career as a graduate assistant coach at Oklahoma State in 1986. After two seasons, he was promoted to the position of recruiting coordinator (1988) and then served as the Cowboys linebackers coach (1989–1991). He subsequently coached at Utah State from 1992 through 1994, working with the linebackers under then head coach Charlie Weatherbie. In that time, the Aggies won a Big West Conference Championship and posted the first bowl victory in school history, winning the 1993 Las Vegas Bowl 42–33 against Ball State.

Guy returned to Oklahoma State in 1995 as the Cowboys linebackers coach. From 1998 to 2000, he served as defensive coordinator at Boise State before taking a similar position at Arizona State. During his time at Boise State, the Broncos won 2 conference championships, the first Division-1 conference championship in school history. Guy was responsible for running a defense that was 1st in total defense, scoring defense, and rush defense both years. Boise State went on to win back to back Humanitarian Bowl Games during that time.

Guy served as the Sun Devils defensive coordinator for four seasons. Guy's 2002 Holiday Bowl defense set school records for sacks and Tackles for Loss (TFLs) with the help of future NFL Super Bowl Champion Terrel Suggs who won the Lombardi and Outland Trophies, thanks in large part to setting the NCAA single season sack record. In 2004, ASU went 9–3 and defeated Purdue in the Sun Bowl. That marked the Sun Devils' second bowl appearance in three years. ASU's defense finished that year ranked 28th nationally in rushing defense, 32nd in pass efficiency defense and 48th in both total and scoring defense. Guy left Arizona State in 2005, returning to Utah State to become the head coach. Between 2005 and 2008, Guy led the Aggies to a 9–38 record. During his tenure, the team failed to win more than three games in any of his four seasons. Following his firing at USU, he was the linebackers coach at Louisville (2009) and UNLV (2010).

Guy was named defensive coordinator and linebackers coach at the University of Tulsa on January 21, 2011. In 2012, the Golden Hurricane went on to win the Conference USA Championship and finished ranked in the top 25 after defeating Iowa State in the Liberty Bowl 31–17. That year, Tulsa's defense set school records in sacks and tackles for loss, finishing second and third in the nation respectively. Tulsa finished the season ranked in the top 25 in defense. In each of his first three seasons at the school, a Golden Hurricane linebacker earned first-team All-Conference USA honors—Curnelius Arnick (2011), DeAundre Brown (2012), and Shawn Jackson (2013). Jackson, who was also named the 2013 Conference USA defensive player of the year, finished his career as Tulsa's all-time leader in sacks (23.5) and tackles for loss (55.5), and second all-time in tackles (409). In Guy's final three years as the defensive play-caller, University of Tulsa ranked ninth in the country for total TFL's, averaging 6.8 per game.

In 2015 Guy was hired as the Memphis safeties coach. That same year the Memphis Tigers earned a 9–3 record and appeared in the Birmingham Bowl. With nine victories in the 2015 season the Tigers set the University of Memphis record for the most wins in a 2-year span.

In December 2016, new FIU head coach Butch Davis hired Guy as defensive coordinator.

In November 2017, Guy was nominated for the Broyles Award.

== Personal life ==
Guy is married to Shawn McManus and has two children, daughter Madison and son Riley. While at Louisville, Guy made a cameo appearance in the 2011 Academy Award-winning documentary Undefeated.

After retiring from coaching, Guy revealed that in 1990 he was diagnosed with bipolar disorder, and that he had spent the majority of his career trying to conceal it. He now works with the National Alliance on Mental Illness to train first responders to recognize more quickly the signs of mental illness.

== Head coaching record ==
Year	Team	Overall	Conference	Standing	Bowl/playoffs
Utah State Aggies (Western Athletic Conference) (2005–2008)
2005	Utah State	3–8	2–6	T–6th	
2006	Utah State	1–11	1–7	T–8th	
2007	Utah State	2–10	2–6	7th	
2008	Utah State	3–9	3–5	7th	
Utah State:		9–38	8–24		
Total:		9–38			
