= LaKemp, Oklahoma =

LaKemp, also written as LaKEMP, Lakemp, and La Kemp, was a prosperous settlement in Beaver County, Oklahoma from 1909 to 1919. It was located approximately 5 to 7 miles north of present-day Booker, Texas. LaKemp became a ghost town when the population left in mass for Booker.

== History ==
LaKemp was founded in 1909 by David L. Kemp, the principal owner and promoter of the town, and the person for whom the town was named. A 1911 Beaver County map shows LaKemp nestled among other ephemeral settlements of the era, including Pronto to the west, Sophia to the east, and Duckpond to the north-northeast, while the Texas border is placed close to its south.

LaKemp was substantial. Over the course of its existence, it had two newspapers: the LaKemp Mirror, which ran from 1909 to about 1919, and The La Kemp Citizen, which ran from 1916 to about 1919. The town had a bank with over $100,000 in deposits, a hotel, blacksmith, dry goods store, drugstore, garage, café, and other available goods and services.

LaKemp grew up on the premise that an Atchison, Topeka and Santa Fe Railway (“AT&SF”) affiliate was going to build a rail line west from Shattuck, Oklahoma through the area. The first edition of The Mirror states that the town had “…railroads and other commercial facilities knocking at her door….” But the AT&SF had other ideas: in 1916 it started buying up land in Lipscomb County, Texas for its line from Shattuck to Spearman, Texas, and in 1917 platted its own town of Booker in a location on that line about 5 to 7 miles south of LaKemp. However, World War I delayed actual construction of the line. So it was in 1919 that the citizens and businesses of LaKemp conducted a mass exodus to Booker, in some cases skidding whole buildings to the new location. The rail line was finally completed all the way to Spearman and opened for business July 1, 1920, as built by the North Texas and Santa Fe Railway and operated by the Panhandle and Santa Fe Railway.

Booker still survives as a town; its population was 1,437 as of the 2020 Census. However, regarding the rail line between Shattuck and Spearman, the Southwestern Railroad (by then operator of that trackage) received abandonment authority in 2007, and the route no longer appears on railroad maps.
