= Darrouzett, Texas =

- Town
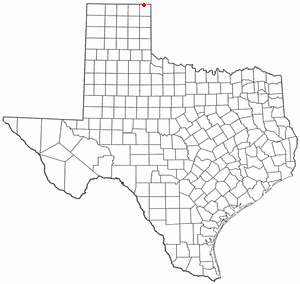
- Location of Darrouzett, Texas

- Coordinates: 36°26′43″N 100°19′22″W
- Country: United States
- State: Texas
- County: Lipscomb

Area
  - Total: 0.37 sq mi (0.97 km^{2})
  - Land: 0.37 sq mi (0.97 km^{2})
  - Water: 0 sq mi (0.00 km^{2})
- Elevation: 2,539 ft (774 m)

Population (2020)
  - Total: 309
  - Density: 830/sq mi (320/km^{2})
- Time zone: UTC-6 (Central (CST))
  - Summer (DST): UTC-5 (CDT)
- ZIP code: 79024
- Area code: 806
- FIPS code: 48-19288
- GNIS feature ID: 2412406
- Website: www.darrouzett.org

Darrouzett (/ˌdærəˈzɛt/ DARR-ə-ZET) is a town in Lipscomb County, Texas, United States. The population was 309 at the 2020 census, down from 350 at the 2010 census. The town is named for John Louis Darrouzet, a Texas state legislator who served as an attorney for the Santa Fe Railroad.

== Geography ==
Darrouzett is located in northern Lipscomb County. Texas State Highway 15 runs through the center of town as Broadway Avenue, leading east 10 miles (16 km) to Follett and west 12 miles (19 km) to Booker. Lipscomb, the county seat, is 17 miles (27 km) to the south by State Highway 305. The Oklahoma border is 4 miles (6 km) north of Darrouzett.

According to the United States Census Bureau, the town has an area of 0.4 square miles (1.0 km^{2}), all land. Plummer Creek and Kiowa Creek cut through town and meet just to the east, near the Darrouzett Golf Course, a par-three, nine-hole course, maintained by volunteers from throughout the county.

== Demographics ==
Historical population
Census	Pop.	Note	%±
1950	328		—
1960	375		14.3%
1970	396		5.6%
1980	352		−11.1%
1990	343		−2.6%
2000	303		−11.7%
2010	350		15.5%
2020	309		−11.7%
U.S. Decennial Census; 2020 Census

As of the census of 2000, there were 303 people, 137 households, and 84 families residing in the town. The population density was 809.7 inhabitants per square mile (312.6/km^{2}). There were 182 housing units at an average density of 486.3 per square mile (187.8/km^{2}). The racial makeup of the town was 91.75% White, 0.66% African American, 0.66% Native American, 2.64% from other races, and 4.29% from two or more races. Hispanic or Latino of any race were 9.24% of the population.

There were 137 households, out of which 23.4% had children under the age of 18 living with them, 54.7% were married couples living together, 3.6% had a female householder with no husband present, and 38.0% were non-families. 36.5% of all households were made up of individuals, and 20.4% had someone living alone who was 65 years of age or older. The average household size was 2.21 and the average family size was 2.89.

In the town, the population was spread out, with 25.4% under the age of 18, 4.0% from 18 to 24, 22.4% from 25 to 44, 25.7% from 45 to 64, and 22.4% who were 65 years of age or older. The median age was 43 years. For every 100 females, there were 94.2 males. For every 100 females age 18 and over, there were 100.0 males.

The median income for a household in the town was $32,625, and the median income for a family was $35,000. Males had a median income of $33,000 versus $19,063 for females. The per capita income for the town was $17,237. About 9.4% of families and 11.3% of the population were below the poverty line, including 12.0% of those under the age of eighteen and none of those 65 or over.

== Education ==
The town is served by the Darrouzett Independent School District and home to the Darrouzett High School Longhorns.

== Climate ==
According to the Köppen Climate Classification system, Darrouzett has a semi-arid climate, abbreviated "BSk" on climate maps.
