= Darrouzett High School =

Coordinates: 36.4473°N 100.3256°W

Location
- 102 Kansas Ave; Darrouzett, Texas 79024-0098; United States

Information
- School type: Public high school
- School district: Darrouzett Independent School District
- Principal: Troy Humphery
- Teaching staff: 17.28 (on an FTE basis)
- Grades: PK-12
- Enrollment: 104 (2023-2024)
- Student to teacher ratio: 6.02
- Colors: Red and Blue
- Athletics conference: UIL Class A
- Mascot: Longhorn
- Yearbook: Round-Up
- Website: Darrouzett High School

Darrouzett High School or Darrouzett School is a public high school located in Darrouzett, Texas (USA). It is part of the Darrouzett Independent School District located in north central Lipscomb County near the Texas-Oklahoma border. Darrouzett recently added high school grades after being a K-6 school for over 10 years. In 2015, the school was rated "Met Standard" by the Texas Education Agency.

== Academics ==
- Team Debate Champions -
  - 1951(B)

== Athletics ==
The Darrouzett Longhorns compete in these sports -

Cross Country, Golf, Basketball, Tennis and Track.
