= For the Record (film) =

2023 documentary film

For the Record is a 2023 documentary film about the decline of the Canadian Record, a weekly newspaper located in the town of Canadian, Texas in the Texas Panhandle. The film was directed by Heather Courtney.
