= William B. Goodrich =

American lawyer and army colonel (1821–1862)

- Born: December 1, 1821; Wilna, New York, U.S.
- Died: September 17, 1862 (aged 40); Sharpsburg, Maryland, U.S.
- Education: Genesee Wesleyan Seminary
- Spouse: Lydia Hildreth (m. 1851–1862)
- Children: 1
- Military career
- Allegiance: (Union)
- Branch: United States Army: Union Army
- Service years: 1846–1848; 1861–1862
- Rank: Colonel
- Commands: 60th New York Infantry Regiment; 3rd Brigade, 2nd Division, XII Corps
- Conflicts: Mexican-American War; American Civil War: Shenandoah Valley Campaign; Maryland campaign; Battle of Antietam † (DOW)

William Bingham Goodrich (1821-1862) was an American colonel and lawyer who served as commander of the 60th New York Infantry Regiment and of the 3rd Brigade, 2nd Division, XII Corps during the American Civil War before being killed in the early hours of the Battle of Antietam.

== Biography ==
=== Early life ===
William Bingham Goodrich was born on December 1, 1821, as the son of Hubbard Goodrich, M. D.; who was killed in a well accident when Goodrich was 14, which resulted in him becoming the sole support of his family. Shortly after his father's death, Goodrich entered the Genesee Wesleyan Seminary in 1835 before graduating in 1839 and then becoming a teacher. He then moved to Wisconsin and became a merchant there.

=== Mexican–American War ===
When the Mexican–American War broke out, Goodrich traveled to St. Louis and became adjutant of the Missouri Battalion of Infantry. After the war, he was a dispatcher to California and remained there for a year as a trader due to the California Gold Rush.

=== Legal career ===
Eventually, Goodrich returned to New York to study law at Ballston Spa, New York. When he passed the bar in 1850, he went to Madrid, New York and became a judge advocate of the 33rd New York Militia Regiment there. While in Madrid, he married Lydia Hildreth in 1851 and the two would have a daughter, Stella, born in 1853. Goodrich moved again to Canton, New York. He was an active abolitionist and, along with Seth P. Remington, published the newspaper St. Lawrence Plain Dealer on August 7, 1856, to spread knowledge on the evils of slavery and promoting the new Republican Party.

=== American Civil War ===
When the American Civil War broke out Goodrich was one of the first to enlist for military service, mustering in with the 60th New York Infantry Regiment at Fine, New York on September 11, 1861. His standing within the community of Canton, as well as being a veteran of the Mexican–American War, led to Goodrich becoming Lieutenant Colonel of the regiment. When presented with the flag of the regiment, Goodrich made the following address:

My social position and pecuniary circumstances are such that I could stay home and enjoy the society of my family, who are dearer than life to me. . .I have not taken this step rashly. I have not been influenced by any sudden excitement. I have thoroughly considered the whole matter, and have come to the conclusion that it is a duty I owe my country, to surrender up my life, if need be, in her defense.... I shall never disgrace that beautiful flag you have presented me. I shall stand by it and defend it to the last; and if I fall, you may depend upon it, it will be at the post of duty.

The 60th New York would spend most of their early service guarding the Baltimore and Ohio Railroad before being sent to the Shenandoah Valley where they faced off against some of Stonewall Jackson's forces. In May 1862, Goodrich was promoted to Colonel and a few days before the Battle of Antietam, he was temporarily given command of the 3rd Brigade, 2nd Division, XII Corps. During this time, Goodrich felt troubled and made a personal request to his friend, Acting Sergeant Major Wilson to make sure his body was sent home if he got killed.

=== Battle of Antietam ===
On the morning of September 17, 1862, Goodrich's brigade was sent to Hagerstown Pike to reinforce Abner Doubleday's division of the I Corps. The brigade marched over the Miller Farm where they saw some action. It is noted by a Union soldier that he was: "firm, cool, and determined, and encouraged his men to their best." Following Miller farm, his Brigade made their way to the West Woods, where Goodrich was shot in the chest and fell off his horse with a severed artery. With his exclaimed yell of "My God, I am hit!". his men came to his aide and he was carried back to a field hospital in a nearby barn, he soon regained consciousness after arrival and, as soon as he saw Sergeant Wilson, he showed great comfort in seeing him. he spent his final moments talking of his family and comforting his fellow soldiers assuring them that they always did their duty. His final words, similar to what he told his men, were: "I have always tried to do my duty!" . He showed a final smile, Wilson being at his side, and died shortly after. Wilson carried out Goodrich's final wish and Goodrich's body was sent to Canton where a funeral, attended by hundreds, was held. Goodrich was buried behind his house with full military honors. Over 40 years later his remains were reinterred in Brooklyn's Green-Wood Cemetery.

=== Legacy ===
Goodrich's daughter, Stella would go on to marry Charles H. Russell and founded Camp Goodrich in New Jersey which would go on to serve as a convalescent home for soldiers and sailors.
