= Higgins Independent School District =

Former school district in Texas

Higgins School

Location
- 406 North Main Street; Higgins, Texas 79046-0218; United States; 36.1231°N 100.0264°W

Information
- School type: Public K-12 school
- School district: Higgins Independent School District
- Principal: Steve James
- Teaching staff: 14.47 (FTE)
- Grades: K-12
- Enrollment: 68 (2019-2020)
- Student to teacher ratio: 4.70
- Colors: Orange, Black & White
- Athletics conference: UIL Class A
- Mascot: Coyote
- Yearbook: The Coyote
- Website: Higgins School

Higgins Independent School District was a public school district based in Higgins, Texas (USA).

In addition to Higgins, the district also served the community of Lipscomb.

Higgins ISD had one school, Higgins School, that served students in grades pre-kindergarten through twelve.

== History ==
A resident who talked to KFDA stated that beginning in 1982, rumors circulated about an imminent closure of the district. In 2020 the superintendent recommended that the district consolidate as the Higgins ISD finances and student enrollment had declined.

The district consolidated with Canadian ISD on July 1, 2020.

== Academic achievement ==
In 2009, the school district was rated "academically acceptable" by the Texas Education Agency.

== Special programs ==
=== Athletics ===
Higgins High and junior high Schools played six-man football. Boys and girls basketball. Track. Tennis. Cross country.

The Higgins Coyotes competed in these sports -

- Basketball
- Cross Country
- 6-Man Football
- Golf
- Tennis
- Track and Field

Theatre Arts

- One Act Play

UIL

== See also ==
- List of school districts in Texas
