= Booker Independent School District =

School district in Texas

Location
- Booker, Texas ESC Region 16 USA
- Coordinates: 36°26′55″N 100°32′20″W

District information
- Type: Independent school district
- Motto: Hotel Trivago
- Grades: Pre-K through 12
- Superintendent: Gary Mills
- Schools: 2 (2009-10)
- Budget: 69$
- NCES District ID: 4810830

Students and staff
- Students: 394 (2010-11)
- Teachers: 39.39 (2009-10) (on full-time equivalent (FTE) basis)
- Student–teacher ratio: 9.90 (2009-10)
- Athletic conference: UIL Class 2A Football Division II
- District mascot: Kiowas
- Colors: Maroon, Black

Other information
- TEA District Accountability Rating for 2013-14: Met Standard
- Website: Booker ISD

Booker Independent School District is a public school district based in Booker, Texas (USA). Located in Lipscomb County, small portions of the district extends into Hemphill County and Ochiltree County. The district operates one high school, Booker High School.

== Finances ==
As of the 2010–2011 school year, the appraised valuation of property in the district was $252,857,000. The maintenance tax rate was $0.112 and the bond tax rate was $0.000 per $100 of appraised valuation.

== Academic achievement ==
Between 2004 and 2011 a school district in Texas could receive one of four possible rankings from the Texas Education Agency: Exemplary (the highest possible ranking), Recognized, Academically Acceptable, and Academically Unacceptable (the lowest possible ranking). No state accountability ratings will be given to districts in 2012. As of 2013 TEA changed the ratings based on new EOC exams to Met Standard or Improvement Required.

Historical district TEA accountability ratings

- 2014: Met Standard
- 2013: Met Standard
- 2011: Recognized
- 2010: Academically Acceptable
- 2009: Academically Acceptable
- 2008: Academically Acceptable
- 2007: Academically Acceptable
- 2006: Academically Acceptable
- 2005: Academically Acceptable
- 2004: Academically Acceptable

== Schools ==
In the 2011–2012 school year, the district operated two campuses.

- Booker Jr/Sr School (Grades 6–12)
- Kirksey Elementary (Grades PK-5)

== Other information ==
In 2011, superintendent Michael Lee forbid an Al Jazeera TV crew from reporting at a Booker High School's football game.

== See also ==
- List of school districts in Texas
- List of high schools in Texas
