= Booker High School (Texas) =

Location
- Main & Mitchell Rd; Booker, Texas 79005-0288; United States; 36.448451°N 100.539186°W

Information
- School type: Public high school
- School district: Booker Independent School District
- Principal: Steven Livingston
- Teaching staff: 23.73 (FTE)
- Grades: 6-12
- Enrollment: 161 (2023-2024)
- Student to teacher ratio: 6.78
- Colors: Maroon and White
- Athletics conference: UIL Class 1A
- Mascot: Kiowa
- Yearbook: Kiowa
- Website: Booker ISD

Booker High School is a public high school located in Booker, Texas (USA) and classified as a 1A school by the UIL. It is part of the Booker Independent School District located in north central Lipscomb County. In 2015, the school was rated "Met Standard" by the Texas Education Agency.

== Academics ==
The Booker Kiowas compete in UIL academics.

=== State titles ===
Computer Science

- 2015(2A) Team
- 2015(2A) Individual
- 2013(1A) Team

Feature Writing

- 1996(1A) Individual
- 1972(1A) Individual

Editorial Writing

- 1993(1A) Individual

Boys Poetry Reading

- 1959(1A) Individual

Boys Prose Reading

- 1970(1A) Individual

Extemporaneous Speech

- 1956(1A) Individual

== Athletics ==
The Booker Kiowas compete in these sports -

Cross country, football, basketball, golf, tennis, track, baseball and softball.

=== State titles ===
- Girls' Cross Country -
  - 1992(1A)
- Boys' Golf -
  - 1974(B), 1993(1A), 1995(1A), 1996(1A)
- Girls' Golf -
  - 1975(B), 1976(B), 1977(B), 1980(B), 1986(1A), 1987(1A), 1988(1A), 1989(1A), 1990(1A), 1991(1A), 1992(1A), 1993(1A)
- Boys' Track -
  - 1964(B), 1965(B)

Individual Titles

Track

- 1968 Boys' 880 yard Individual
- 1969 Boys' Mile Run Individual
- 1988 Girls' 400 Relay

Tennis

- 1996(1A) Girls' Doubles
- 1981(1A) Boys' Singles

== Band ==
- UIL Marching Band Sweepstakes Champion -
  - 1980(B), 1983(1A)
