= Malouf Abraham =

American politician (1915–1994)

Member of the Texas House of Representatives
- In office 1967–1971
- Succeeded by: Phil Cates

Personal details
- Born: July 26, 1915 Canadian, Texas, U.S.
- Died: May 30, 1994 (aged 78) Canadian, Texas, U.S.
- Party: Republican
- Education: Texas Tech University (attended)

Malouf Abraham (July 26, 1915 – May 30, 1994) was an American businessman and politician who served as a member of the Texas House of Representatives from 1967 to 1971.

== Early life and education ==
Abraham's father, Nahim Abraham, immigrated to the United States from Lebanon. Nahim and his wife eventually settled in Canadian, Texas, where they owned several businesses. Born and raised in Canadian, Abraham attended Texas Tech University before dropping out to pursue business ventures.

== Career ==
Early in his career, Abraham managed a restaurant, operated a small real estate business, and eventually established an oil and gas venture. Abraham became successful in the oil business, and eventually served as the mayor of Canadian.

In 1966, he was elected to the Texas House of Representatives, serving until 1971. In 1970, he was a candidate for the Texas Senate, losing to Max Sherman. Abraham then returned to Canadian and resumed his business activities. Prior to his death in 1994, Abraham made donations to local organizations and established endowments at Texas Tech University and West Texas A&M University.

== Personal life ==
Abraham's son, Malouf Abraham Jr., was a physician and art collector who founded a gallery in Canadian. Abraham's grandson, Salem Abraham, is a hedge fund manager.
