= The Canadian Record =

American weekly newspaper located in Canadian, Texas

- Type: Weekly newspaper
- Owner: Laurie Ezzell Brown
- News editor: Cathy Ricketts
- Founded: 1893; 133 years ago
- Ceased publication: March 2, 2023
- Language: English
- Headquarters: 211 Main Street, Canadian, Texas
- Country: United States
- ISSN: 2834-2046 (print); 2834-2054 (web)
- OCLC number: 14062638
- Website: canadianrecord.com

The Canadian Record was a weekly newspaper of Canadian, Texas, first published in 1893.

== History ==
Ben Ezzell acquired the newspaper in 1948. He opposed the Vietnam War and supported the Civil rights movement. Following Ezzell's death in 1993, his daughter Laurie Ezzell Brown took control of the newspaper.

After decades in the business, and citing stress from the constant workload, Brown ceased print production in 2023. As the final print newspaper in Canadian, the paper's last days are depicted in the documentary film For the Record.

Brown was inducted into the Texas Newspaper Hall of Fame in 2025.
