= 60th New York Infantry Regiment =

- Active: July 5, 1861 - July 17, 1865
- Country: United States of America
- Allegiance: Union
- Branch: Infantry
- Nicknames: First St. Lawrence Regiment, Ogdensburg Regiment
- Engagements: Jackson's Valley campaign First Battle of Rappahannock Station; Second Battle of Bull Run; Battle of Antietam; Battle of Chancellorsville; Battle of Gettysburg; Chattanooga campaign Battle of Lookout Mountain; Battle of Missionary Ridge; Battle of Ringgold Gap; Atlanta campaign Battle of Resaca; Battle of Dallas; Battle of New Hope Church; Battle of Allatoona; Battle of Gilgal Church; Battle of Kennesaw Mountain; Battle of Peachtree Creek; Siege of Atlanta; Sherman's March to the Sea; Carolinas campaign Battle of Bentonville

Commanders
- Notable commanders: George S. Greene

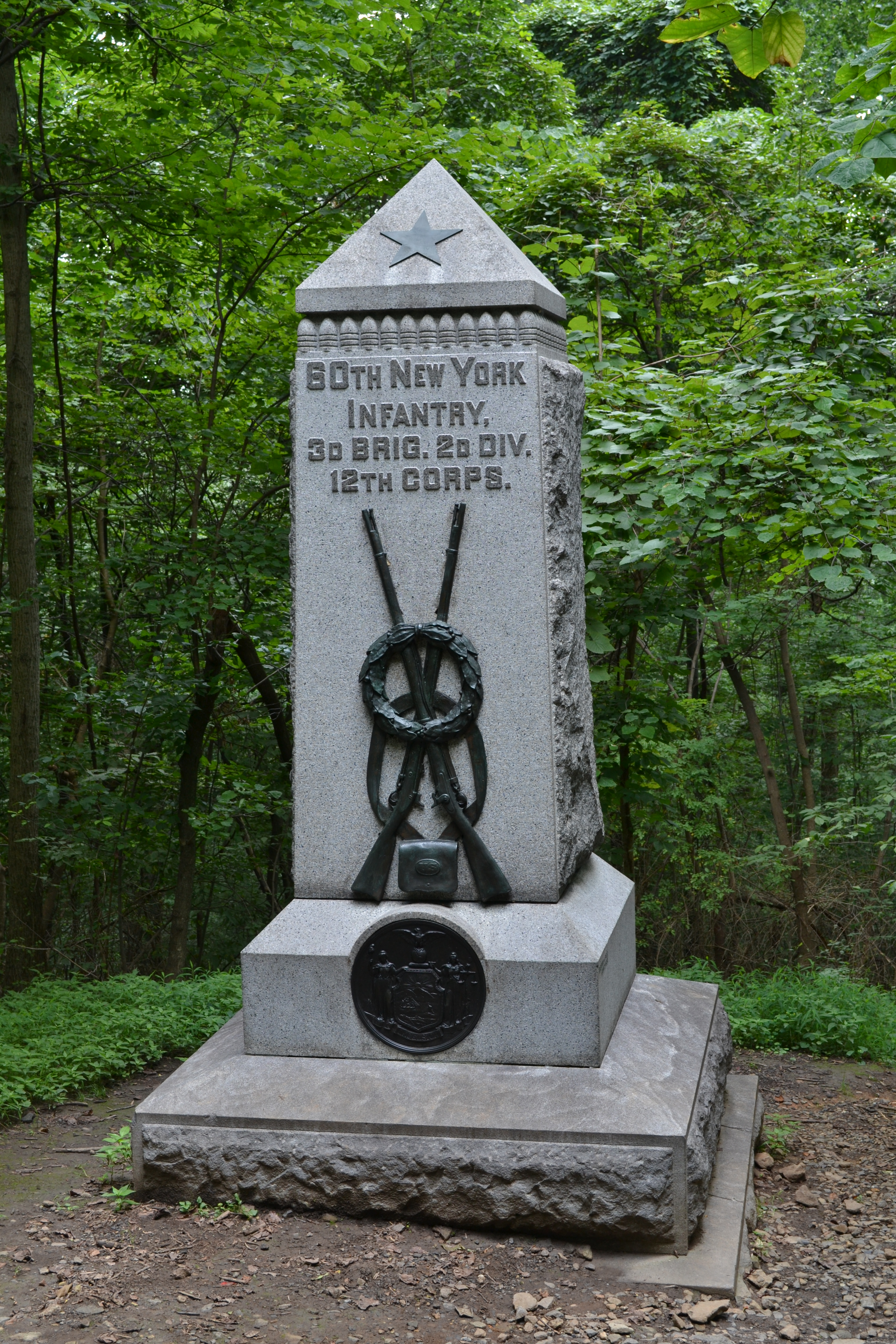
60th New York Volunteer Infantry Monument, Culp's Hill, Gettysburg

The 60th New York Infantry Regiment (a.k.a. "St. Lawrence Regiment") was an infantry regiment in the Union Army during the American Civil War. The regiment saw service in both the eastern and the western theaters of the American Civil War.

== Service ==
The 60th New York Infantry was organized at Ogdensburg, New York beginning July 5, 1861 and mustered in for a three-year enlistment on October 30, 1861 under the command of Colonel William B. Hayward.

The regiment was attached to Dix's Division to March 1862. Railroad Brigade, Army of the Potomac, to June 1863. 2nd Brigade, Sigel's Division, Department of the Shenandoah, to June 26, 1862. 2nd Brigade, 2nd Division, II Corps, Pope's Army of Virginia, to August 1862. 3rd Brigade, 2nd Division, II Corps, Army of Virginia, to September 1862. 3rd Brigade, 2nd Division, XII Corps, Army of the Potomac, to October 1862. 2nd Brigade, 2nd Division, XII Corps, to May 1863. 3rd Brigade, 2nd Division, XII Corps, Army of the Potomac, to October 1863, and Army of the Cumberland to April 1864. 3rd Brigade, 2nd Division, XX Corps, Army of the Cumberland, to July 1865.

The 60th New York Infantry mustered out of service July 17, 1865.

=== Detailed service ===
The 60th New York's detailed service is as follows:

==== 1861 ====
- Left New York for Baltimore, Md., November 4, 1861.
- Duty at Baltimore, Md., and between there and Washington, D.C.; also at Relay House, Md., and Harpers Ferry, Va., until June 1862.

==== 1862 ====
- Defense of Harpers Ferry May 28–30.
- Operations in the Shenandoah Valley until August.
- Pope's Campaign in northern Virginia August 16-September 2.
- Sulphur Springs August 24. Battle of Groveton August 29.
- Second Battle of Bull Run August 30.
- Maryland Campaign September 6–22.
- Battle of Antietam September 16–17.
- Duty at Bolivar Heights until December.
- Reconnaissance to Rippon, Va., November 9.
- Expedition to Winchester December 2–6.
- Marched to Fredericksburg, Va., December 9–16.
- Duty at Fairfax until January 20, 1863.

==== 1863 ====
- "Mud March" January 20–24.
- Chancellorsville Campaign April 27-May 6.
- Battle of Chancellorsville May 1–5.
- Gettysburg Campaign June 11-July 24.
- Battle of Gettysburg July 1–3.
- Pursuit of Lee to Manassas Gap, Va., July 5–24.
- Duty on line of the Rappahannock until September 24.
- Movement to Bridgeport, Ala., September 24-October 3.
- Duty in Lookout Valley until November.
- Reopening Tennessee River October 26–29.
- Chattanooga-Ringgold Campaign November 23–27.
- Battle of Lookout Mountain November 23–24.
- Battle of Missionary Ridge November 25.
- Battle of Ringgold Gap, Taylor's Ridge, November 27.
- Duty at Bridgeport, Ala., until May 1864.

==== 1864 ====
- Scout from Stevenson to Caperton's Ferry April 11 (detachment).
- Veterans on furlough December 1863-January 1864.
- Atlanta Campaign May 1-September 8.
- Operations about Rocky Faced Ridge, Tunnel Hill, and Buzzard's Roost May 8–11.
- Battle of Resaca May 14–15.
- Near Cassville May 19.
- New Hope Church May 25.
- Battles about Dallas, New Hope Church, and Allatoona Hills May 26-June 5.
- Operations about Marietta and against Kennesaw Mountain June 10-July 2.
- Pine Mountain June 11–14.
- Ackworth June 12.
- Lost Mountain June 15–17.
- Gilgal or Golgotha Church June 15.
- Muddy Creek June 17.
- Noyes Creek June 19.
- Kolb's Farm June 22.
- Assault on Kennesaw June 27.
- Ruff's Station, Smyrna Camp Ground, July 4.
- Chattahoochee River July 6–17.
- Peachtree Creek July 19–20.
- Siege of Atlanta July 22-August 25.
- Operations at Chattahoochie River Bridge August 26-September 2.
- Occupation of Atlanta September 2 to November 15.
- Expedition from Atlanta to Tuckum's Cross Roads October 26–29.
- Near Atlanta November 9.
- March to the sea November 15-December 10.
- Near Davisboro November 28.
- Siege of Savannah December 10–21.

==== 1865 ====
- Carolinas Campaign January to April 1865.
- North Edisto River, S.C., February 12–13.
- Battle of Bentonville, N.C., March 19–21.
- Occupation of Goldsboro March 24.
- Advance on Raleigh April 9–13.
- Occupation of Raleigh April 14.
- Bennett's House April 26.
- Surrender of Johnston and his army.
- March to Washington, D. C, via Richmond, Va., April 29-May 20.
- Grand Review of the Armies May 24.

== Casualties ==
The regiment lost a total of 168 men during service; 3 officers and 64 enlisted men killed or mortally wounded, 5 officers and 96 enlisted men died of disease, a total of 168.

== Commanders ==
- Colonel William B. Hayward - removed from command in January 1862 at the petition of the regiment's company commanders
- Colonel George S. Greene - promoted to brigadier general April 28, 1862
- Colonel William B. Goodrich - mortally wounded in action at the Battle of Antietam while in brigade command
- Colonel Abel Godard - discharged September 13, 1864 due to disability
- Colonel Winslow M. Thomas - discharged April 3, 1865 due to disability
- Colonel Lester S. Willson
- Lieutenant Colonel Charles Russell Brundage - commanded at the Battle of Antietam
- Lieutenant Colonel John C. O. Redington - commanded at the Battle of Chancellorsville
- Lieutenant Colonel Lester S. Williams - commanded during the Carolinas Campaign
- Major Thomas Elliott - commanded during the March to the Sea

== Notable members ==
- Brevet Major General George S. Greene, Commander - one of the oldest Generals during the Civil War, and one of the most aggressive union commanders too
- Corporal Follett Johnson, Company H - Medal of Honor recipient for action at the Battle of New Hope Church

== See also ==
- List of New York Civil War regiments
- New York in the Civil War
- Roster of the 60th New York Infantry
