= Richard A. Waterfield =

American politician

Texas State Representative for District 88
- In office 1987–1990
- Preceded by: John W. "Buck" Buchanan
- Succeeded by: David Swinford

Personal details
- Born: Richard Allen Waterfield; August 24, 1939 Canadian, Texas, U.S.
- Died: February 26, 2007 (aged 67) Austin, Texas, U.S.
- Resting place: Edith Ford Cemeteries in Canadian, Texas
- Party: Republican
- Education: Oklahoma State University
- Occupation: Business; rancher

Richard Allen Waterfield, known as Dick Waterfield (August 24, 1939 – February 26, 2007), was a rancher in the Texas Panhandle who from 1987 to 1991 was a Republican member of the Texas House of Representatives for District 88, including his native Canadian, Texas. Waterfield was particularly known for his advocacy of home meal-delivery systems for the elderly and disabled.

== Background ==
Waterfield was one of two sons born to Richard Bruce Waterfield and the former Marjorie Jones (1904–1961). He graduated from Canadian High School and then attended Oklahoma State University in Stillwater, Oklahoma, where he was a member of Beta Theta Pi. He then operated his family ranch and was the president and co-owner of Canadian Feed Yards. He was the president of the interest group, the Texas Cattle Feeders Association, and a director of the First State Bank of Canadian.

== Political career ==
In 1987, Waterfield succeeded the veteran Democratic State Representative John W. "Buck" Buchanan of Dumas in Moore County.

In 1990, Waterfield won the Republican nomination for Texas's 18th congressional district in a primary challenge to former U.S. Representative Bob Price of Pampa. However, Waterfield lost the general election to the incumbent Democrat Bill Sarpalius of Amarillo. Waterfield received 63,045 ballots (43.5 percent) to Sarpalius' 81,815 votes (56.5 percent). Waterfield had resigned his state House seat to make the congressional race, and in 1991, his legislative seat passed to fellow Republican David Swinford of Dumas.

In 1991, Waterfield, having relocated permanently to the capital city of Austin, became the assistant to Democrat-turned-Republican Rick Perry, the future governor of Texas who in 1990 had unseated the Democrat Jim Hightower in a heated race for Texas Agriculture Commissioner. In the new position, Waterfield worked to establish the Texas Agriculture Finance Authority. He soon resigned the position.

== Later years ==
After leaving the agriculture department, Waterfield was active in the Austin business community, having owned Waterworks Productions and Waterfield and Associates, Inc.

Waterfield died in Austin at the age of sixty-seven. Services were held at Riverbend Church and at the First United Methodist Church in Canadian.

Texas House of Representatives
| Preceded by John W. "Buck" Buchanan | Texas State Representative for District 88 (Texas Panhandle); 1987–1990 | Succeeded by David Swinford |
