= Lipscomb County, Texas =

County in Texas, United States

- County
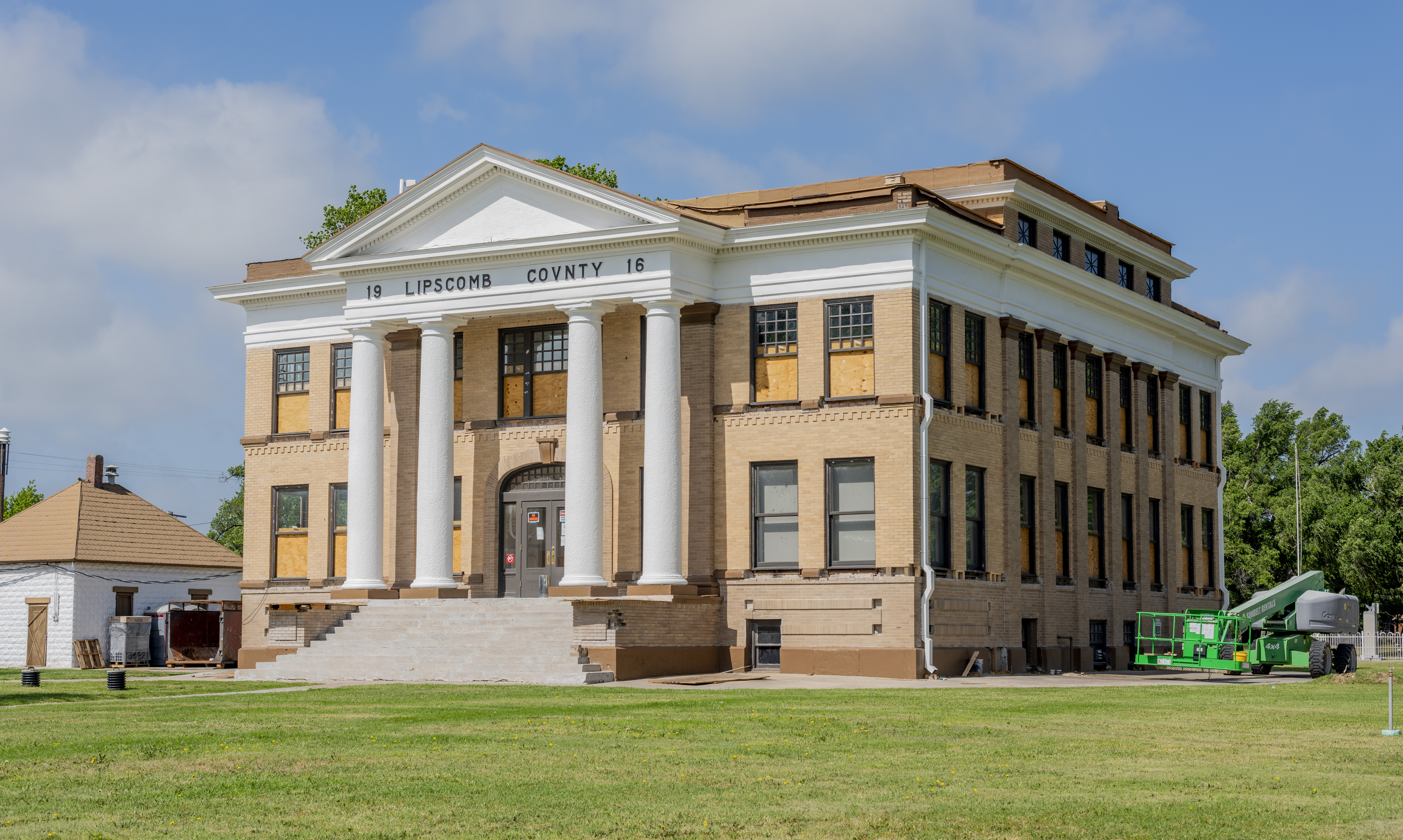
- Lipscomb County courthouse in Lipscomb. Shown here undergoing restoration in May 2020.

- Location within the U.S. state of Texas
- Coordinates: 36°17′N 100°16′W
- Country: United States
- State: Texas
- Founded: 1887
- Named for: Abner Smith Lipscomb
- Seat: Lipscomb
- Largest town: Booker

Area
  - Total: 932 sq mi (2,410 km^{2})
  - Land: 932 sq mi (2,410 km^{2})
  - Water: 0.1 sq mi (0.26 km^{2}) 0.01%

Population (2020)
  - Total: 3,059
  - Estimate (2025): 2,955 ▼
  - Density: 3.28/sq mi (1.27/km^{2})
- Time zone: UTC−6 (Central)
  - Summer (DST): UTC−5 (CDT)
- Congressional district: 13th
- Website: www.co.lipscomb.tx.us

Lipscomb County (/ˈlɪpskəm/ LIP-skəm) is a county located in the U.S. state of Texas. As of the 2020 census, its population was 3,059. Its county seat is Lipscomb. The county was created in 1876 and organized in 1887. It is named for Judge Abner Smith Lipscomb, a secretary of state of the Republic of Texas.

== Geography ==
According to the U.S. Census Bureau, the county has a total area of 932 sq mi (2,410 km^{2}), almost all of which are land and 0.1 sq mi (0.26 km^{2}) (0.01%) is covered by water.

=== Major highways ===
- U.S. Highway 60
- U.S. Highway 83
- State Highway 15
- State Highway 23
- State Highway 213
- State Highway 305
- Spur 188

=== Adjacent counties ===
- Beaver County, Oklahoma (north)
- Ellis County, Oklahoma (east)
- Hemphill County (south)
- Roberts County (southwest)
- Ochiltree County (west)

== Demographics ==
Historical population
| Census | Pop. | Note | %± |
|---|---|---|---|
| 1880 | 69 | | — |
| 1890 | 632 | | 815.9% |
| 1900 | 790 | | 25.0% |
| 1910 | 2,634 | | 233.4% |
| 1920 | 3,684 | | 39.9% |
| 1930 | 4,512 | | 22.5% |
| 1940 | 3,764 | | −16.6% |
| 1950 | 3,658 | | −2.8% |
| 1960 | 3,406 | | −6.9% |
| 1970 | 3,486 | | 2.3% |
| 1980 | 3,766 | | 8.0% |
| 1990 | 3,143 | | −16.5% |
| 2000 | 3,057 | | −2.7% |
| 2010 | 3,302 | | 8.0% |
| 2020 | 3,059 | | −7.4% |
| 2025 (est.) | 2,955 | ▼ | −3.4% |
U.S. Decennial Census; 1850–1900 1910; 1920 1930 1940; 1950 1960 1970; 1980 1990 2000; 2010 2020

Lipscomb County, Texas – Racial and ethnic composition Note: the US Census treats Hispanic/Latino as an ethnic category. This table excludes Latinos from the racial categories and assigns them to a separate category. Hispanics/Latinos may be of any race.
| Race / Ethnicity (NH = Non-Hispanic) | Pop 2000 | Pop 2010 | Pop 2020 | % 2000 | % 2010 | % 2020 |
|---|---|---|---|---|---|---|
| White alone (NH) | 2,344 | 2,213 | 1,786 | 76.68% | 67.02% | 58.39% |
| Black or African American alone (NH) | 13 | 7 | 4 | 0.43% | 0.21% | 0.13% |
| Native American or Alaska Native alone (NH) | 39 | 22 | 29 | 1.28% | 0.67% | 0.95% |
| Asian alone (NH) | 2 | 10 | 2 | 0.07% | 0.30% | 0.07% |
| Pacific Islander alone (NH) | 0 | 0 | 0 | 0.00% | 0.00% | 0.00% |
| Other race alone (NH) | 0 | 2 | 4 | 0.00% | 0.06% | 0.13% |
| Mixed race or Multiracial (NH) | 26 | 41 | 111 | 0.85% | 1.24% | 3.63% |
| Hispanic or Latino (any race) | 633 | 1,007 | 1,123 | 20.71% | 30.50% | 36.71% |
| Total | 3,057 | 3,302 | 3,059 | 100.00% | 100.00% | 100.00% |

=== 2020 census ===
As of the 2020 census, the county had a population of 3,059. The median age was 40.9 years, with 24.7% of residents under the age of 18 and 20.5% aged 65 years or older. For every 100 females there were 99.2 males, and for every 100 females age 18 and over there were 98.6 males.

The racial makeup of the county was 64.4% White, 0.1% Black or African American, 1.2% American Indian and Alaska Native, 0.1% Asian, <0.1% Native Hawaiian and Pacific Islander, 18.3% from some other race, and 15.9% from two or more races. Hispanic or Latino residents of any race comprised 36.7% of the population.

<0.1% of residents lived in urban areas, while 100.0% lived in rural areas.

There were 1,220 households in the county, of which 33.8% had children under the age of 18 living in them. Of all households, 56.1% were married-couple households, 17.6% were households with a male householder and no spouse or partner present, and 22.5% were households with a female householder and no spouse or partner present. About 26.2% of all households were made up of individuals and 14.2% had someone living alone who was 65 years of age or older.

There were 1,558 housing units, of which 21.7% were vacant. Among occupied housing units, 76.6% were owner-occupied and 23.4% were renter-occupied. The homeowner vacancy rate was 2.1% and the rental vacancy rate was 19.7%.

=== 2000 census ===
As of the census of 2000, 3,057 people, 1,205 households, and 845 families were residing in the county. The population density was 3 people per square mile (1.2 people/km^{2}). The 1,541 housing units averaged 2 units per square mile (0.77/km^{2}). The racial makeup of the county was 82.86% White, 0.52% African American, 1.37% Native American, 0.07% Asian, 12.99% from other races, and 2.19% from two or more races. About 20.71% of the population were Hispanics or Latinos of any race. In terms of ancestry, 19.7% were of German, 11.8% were of Irish, 10.4% were of English, 7.8% were of American, 2.6% were of Scottish, 2.4% were of French, 1.8% were of Dutch.

Of the 1,205 households, 32.50% had children under the age of 18 living with them, 62.10% were married couples living together, 5.90% had a female householder with no husband present, and 29.80% were not families. About 28.00% of all households were made up of individuals, and 16.20% had someone living alone who was 65 years of age or older. The average household size was 2.50, and the average family size was 3.06.

In the county, the population distribution was 27.60% under the age of 18, 5.90% from 18 to 24, 24.70% from 25 to 44, 23.40% from 45 to 64, and 18.40% who were 65 years of age or older. The median age was 40 years. For every 100 females, there were 94.60 males. For every 100 females age 18 and over, there were 93.00 males.

The median income for a household in the county was $31,964, and for a family was $39,375. Males had a median income of $28,750 versus $20,034 for females. The per capita income for the county was $16,328. About 12.90% of families and 16.70% of the population were below the poverty line, including 23.50% of those under age 18 and 12.40% of those age 65 or over.

== Communities ==
=== Towns ===
- Booker (small part in Ochiltree County)
- Darrouzett
- Follett
- Higgins

=== Census-designated place ===
- Lipscomb (county seat)

== Politics ==
Lipscomb County is located within District 87 of the Texas House of Representatives. Lipscomb County is located within District 31 of the Texas Senate.

United States presidential election results for Lipscomb County, Texas
| Year | Republican | | Democratic | | Third party(ies) | |
| Year | No. | % | No. | % | No. | % |
|---|---|---|---|---|---|---|
| 1912 | 47 | 10.11% | 251 | 53.98% | 167 | 35.91% |
| 1916 | 116 | 22.18% | 350 | 66.92% | 57 | 10.90% |
| 1920 | 425 | 51.77% | 350 | 42.63% | 46 | 5.60% |
| 1924 | 405 | 42.68% | 430 | 45.31% | 114 | 12.01% |
| 1928 | 776 | 69.35% | 331 | 29.58% | 12 | 1.07% |
| 1932 | 349 | 27.46% | 865 | 68.06% | 57 | 4.48% |
| 1936 | 273 | 21.79% | 973 | 77.65% | 7 | 0.56% |
| 1940 | 445 | 36.15% | 774 | 62.88% | 12 | 0.97% |
| 1944 | 396 | 38.37% | 551 | 53.39% | 85 | 8.24% |
| 1948 | 354 | 33.75% | 668 | 63.68% | 27 | 2.57% |
| 1952 | 1,174 | 85.13% | 204 | 14.79% | 1 | 0.07% |
| 1956 | 806 | 69.84% | 345 | 29.90% | 3 | 0.26% |
| 1960 | 939 | 77.67% | 267 | 22.08% | 3 | 0.25% |
| 1964 | 763 | 56.43% | 589 | 43.57% | 0 | 0.00% |
| 1968 | 1,079 | 69.84% | 279 | 18.06% | 187 | 12.10% |
| 1972 | 1,226 | 87.57% | 156 | 11.14% | 18 | 1.29% |
| 1976 | 911 | 58.06% | 644 | 41.05% | 14 | 0.89% |
| 1980 | 1,343 | 77.50% | 338 | 19.50% | 52 | 3.00% |
| 1984 | 1,461 | 85.54% | 241 | 14.11% | 6 | 0.35% |
| 1988 | 1,111 | 74.12% | 377 | 25.15% | 11 | 0.73% |
| 1992 | 839 | 57.74% | 338 | 23.26% | 276 | 19.00% |
| 1996 | 869 | 64.66% | 357 | 26.56% | 118 | 8.78% |
| 2000 | 1,072 | 82.84% | 206 | 15.92% | 16 | 1.24% |
| 2004 | 1,147 | 85.79% | 184 | 13.76% | 6 | 0.45% |
| 2008 | 1,093 | 87.02% | 155 | 12.34% | 8 | 0.64% |
| 2012 | 1,044 | 89.38% | 119 | 10.19% | 5 | 0.43% |
| 2016 | 1,159 | 87.01% | 135 | 10.14% | 38 | 2.85% |
| 2020 | 1,205 | 89.06% | 131 | 9.68% | 17 | 1.26% |
| 2024 | 1,125 | 89.36% | 123 | 9.77% | 11 | 0.87% |

United States Senate election results for Lipscomb County, Texas1
| Year | Republican | | Democratic | | Third party(ies) | |
| Year | No. | % | No. | % | No. | % |
|---|---|---|---|---|---|---|
| 2024 | 1,094 | 87.66% | 131 | 10.50% | 23 | 1.84% |

United States Senate election results for Lipscomb County, Texas2
| Year | Republican | | Democratic | | Third party(ies) | |
| Year | No. | % | No. | % | No. | % |
|---|---|---|---|---|---|---|
| 2020 | 1,181 | 89.20% | 117 | 8.84% | 26 | 1.96% |

Texas Gubernatorial election results for Lipscomb County
| Year | Republican | | Democratic | | Third party(ies) | |
| Year | No. | % | No. | % | No. | % |
|---|---|---|---|---|---|---|
| 2022 | 894 | 91.50% | 69 | 7.06% | 14 | 1.43% |

== Education ==
School districts include:

- Booker Independent School District
- Canadian Independent School District
- Darrouzett Independent School District
- Follett Independent School District

Higgins Independent School District, which had territory in the county, merged into Canadian ISD effective July 1, 2020.

== See also ==
- List of museums in the Texas Panhandle
- National Register of Historic Places listings in Lipscomb County, Texas
- Recorded Texas Historic Landmarks in Lipscomb County
