= Canadian Independent School District =

School district in Texas

Canadian High School

Location
- 621 South Fifth Street; Canadian, (Hemphill County), Texas 79014; United States; 35.909198°N 100.385287°W

Information
- Type: Public high school
- Principal: Rod Been
- Staff: 29.24 (FTE)
- Enrollment: 293 (2023-24)
- Student to teacher ratio: 10.02
- Colors: Black and gold
- Nickname: Wildcats
- Website: Canadian High School

Canadian Independent School District is a public school district based in Canadian, Texas, United States.

In addition to Hemphill County, where it serves Canadian and Glazier; it includes a section of Lipscomb County, where it serves Higgins.

In 2009, the school district was rated "academically acceptable" by the Texas Education Agency.

Ken King, a former president of the CISD, is now the Texas state representative from District 88, which encompasses a large swath of the Panhandle and the South Plains, including Canadian and Hemphill County. The current president and vice president of the trustees are Larry Gatlin and Courtney Trollinger, respectively.

The Canadian football and boys basketball teams won the state championships during the 2014-2015 school year. They repeated that feat during the 2015-2016 school year. Canadian ISD is the first school in UIL history to win back-to-back titles in both football and basketballs.

== History ==
In 1951, the Baker School Annex, which has seven classrooms and had a cost of $90,000, opened.

Woodie E. Beene served as superintendent until he resigned in 1966 so he could become superintendent of Stamford ISD. Joe R. Cullender succeeded him as superintendent; Cullender was previously principal of the high school.

On July 1, 2020, Higgins Independent School District consolidated into Canadian ISD. CISD superintendent Lynn Pulliam stated that he expected the enrollment of Canadian ISD schools to increase by 35, based upon the overall population of the town of Higgins.

== Schools ==
- Canadian High (grades 9-12)
- Canadian Middle (grades 6-8)
- Baker Elementary (grades 3-5)
- Canadian Elementary (prekindergarten-grade 2)
