= Follett Johnson =

- Born: April 20, 1843; Brasher, New York, US
- Died: March 9, 1909 (aged 65)
- Burial place: Old Pine Grove Cemetery, Massena, New York, US
- Military career
- Allegiance: United States of America
- Branch: United States Navy
- Rank: Corporal
- Units: Company H, 60th New York Volunteer Infantry
- Conflicts: American Civil War
- Awards: Medal of Honor

Follett Johnson (April 20, 1843 – March 9, 1909) was a Union Army officer in the American Civil War who received the U.S. military's highest decoration, the Medal of Honor.

Johnson was born in Brasher, New York and was recruited to the army at Ogdensburg. Johnson was awarded the Medal of Honor for his actions at the Battle of New Hope Church on May 27, 1864.

His Medal of Honor was issued on April 6, 1892

== Medal of Honor citation ==
The President of the United States of America, in the name of Congress, takes pleasure in presenting the Medal of Honor to Corporal Follett Johnson, United States Army, for extraordinary heroism on 27 May 1864, while serving with Company H, 60th New York Infantry, in action at New Hope Church, Georgia. Corporal Johnson voluntarily exposed himself to the fire of a Confederate sharpshooter, thus drawing fire upon himself and enabling his comrade to shoot the sharpshooter.
