= Joseph Leonard Follett =

American soldier (1843 – 1907)

Joseph L. Follett
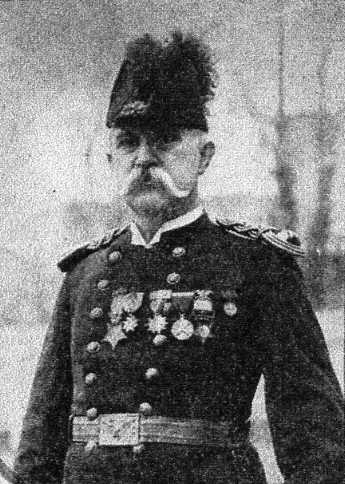
- Medal of Honor recipient Joseph Leonard Follett in GAR uniform c1897
- Born: February 16, 1843; Newark, New Jersey, US
- Died: April 1, 1907 (aged 64); New York City, US
- Burial place: Albany Rural Cemetery, Menands, New York
- Military career
- Allegiance: United States
- Branch: United States Army; Union Army
- Service years: 1861–1865
- Rank: Sergeant
- Unit: Battery G, 1st Missouri Light Artillery
- Conflicts: Battle of Island Number Ten; Battle of Stones River
- Awards: Medal of Honor

Joseph Leonard Follett (February 16, 1843 – April 1, 1907) was an American soldier who fought in the American Civil War. Follett received the country's highest award for bravery during combat, the Medal of Honor, for his action during the Battle of Island Number Ten in New Madrid, Missouri on 3 March 1862 and the Battle of Stones River in Tennessee on 31 December 1862. He was honored with the award on 19 September 1890.

== Biography ==
Follett was born in Newark, New Jersey on 16 February 1843 to Jacob Follett and Catherine Miller. He married Grace Kilgore and together they had a daughter Belsie Grace Follett 13 Jun 1874. He joined the 1st Missouri Infantry in April 1861, later re-organized as the 1st Missouri Light Artillery. He died on 1 April 1907 and his remains are interred at the Albany Rural Cemetery in Albany, New York.

== Medal of Honor citation ==
The President of the United States of America, in the name of Congress, takes pleasure in presenting the Medal of Honor to Sergeant Joseph Leonard Follett, United States Army, for extraordinary heroism on 3 March 1862, while serving with Company G, 1st Missouri Light Artillery, in action at New Madrid, Missouri. Sergeant Follett remained on duty though severely wounded. On 31 December 1862, while procuring ammunition from the supply train at Stone River, Tennessee, he was captured, but made his escape, secured the ammunition, and in less than an hour from the time of his capture had the batteries supplied.

== See also ==
- List of American Civil War Medal of Honor recipients: A–F
- Chronicling America
