= Darrouzett Independent School District =

School district in Texas

Address
- 102 W Kansas Ave Darrouzett, Texas, 79024-0098; United States
- Coordinates: 36.447683°N 100.325595°W

District information
- Type: Public
- Motto: Community of Learners
- Grades: PK–12
- Established: 1918; 108 years ago
- NCES District ID: 4816320

Students and staff
- Enrollment: 104
- Staff: 17.29 (on an FTE basis)
- Student–teacher ratio: 6.02
- District mascot: Longhorns
- Colors: Red, White & Blue

Other information
- Website: darrouzettisd.gov

Darrouzett Independent School District is a public school district based in Darrouzett, Texas (USA).

The district has one school. Prior to the 2006–2007 school year the district school operated only through Grade 6 (though at one time prior it operated through Grade 12). In the 2006–2007 school year the district reintroduced Grades 7–8, and since then has once again established itself as a K-12 school district.

== Academic achievement ==
In 2009, the school district was rated "recognized" by the Texas Education Agency.

== Special programs ==
=== Athletics ===
Darrouzett High School competes in basketball, track, cross country, tennis and golf.

== See also ==
- List of school districts in Texas
