= Follett House =

Historic house in Vermont, United States

- U.S. National Register of Historic Places
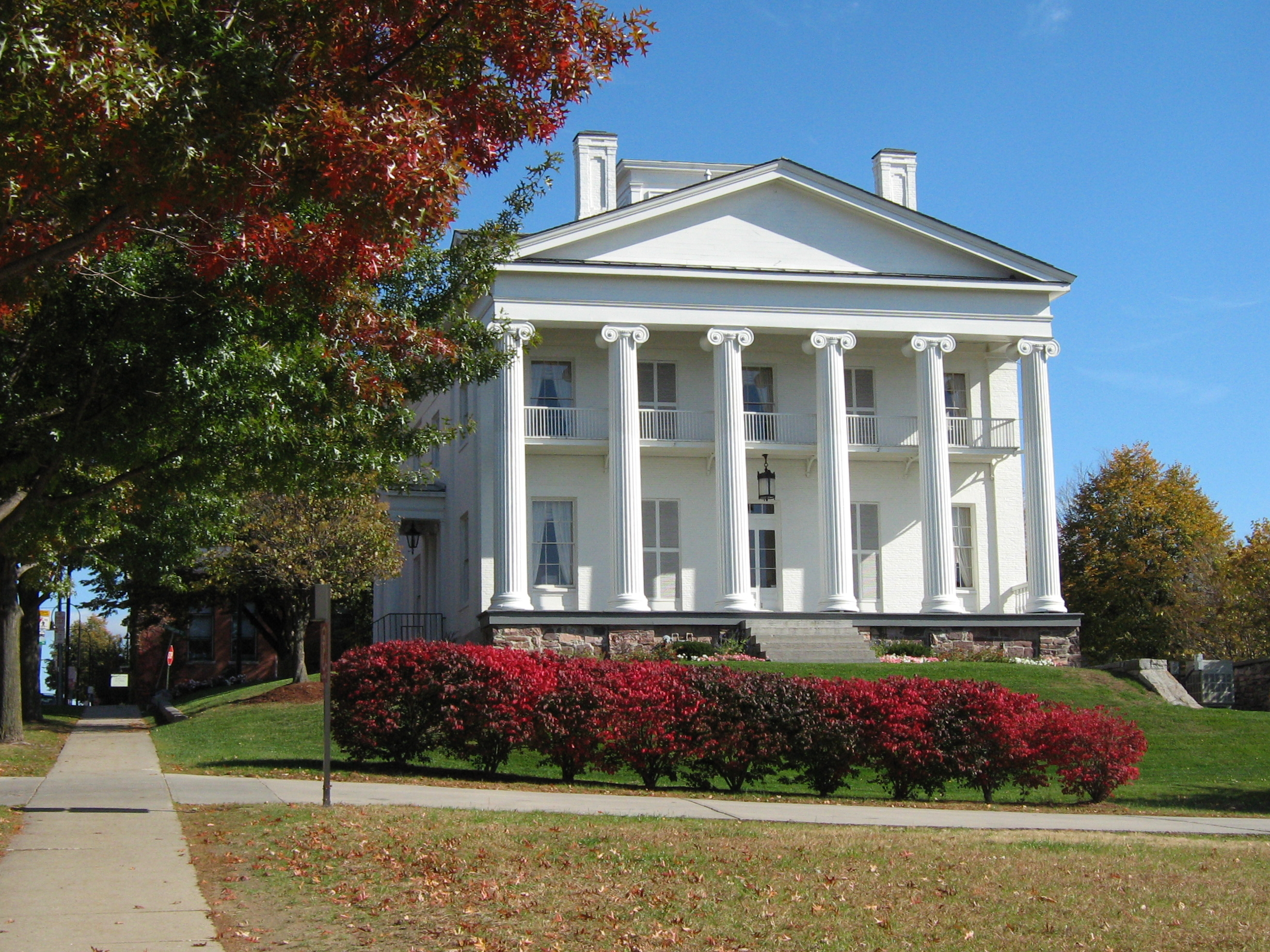

- Location within Vermont Location within the United States
- Interactive map showing the location of Follett House
- Location: 63 College St., Burlington, Vermont
- Coordinates: 44°28′36″N 73°13′4″W
- Area: less than one acre
- Built: 1840
- Architect: Young, Ammi B.
- Architectural style: Greek Revival
- NRHP reference No.: 72000091
- Added to NRHP: October 30, 1972

The Follett House is a historic house at 63 College Street in Burlington, Vermont. Built in 1840 for a prominent local businessman, it is the last surviving grand 19th-century lakeside mansion in the city, and one of the state's finest examples of Greek Revival architecture. It was listed on the National Register of Historic Places in 1972. It has seen commercial and institutional uses since 1885.

== Description and history ==
The Follett House stands prominently overlooking Burlington's waterfront, at the southwest corner of college and South Champlain Streets. The house is oriented facing west toward Lake Champlain, with a terraced lawn extending westward to Battery Street. It is a 2 1/2-story brick structure, with a gabled roof, clapboarded exterior, and stone foundation. The main facade is five bays wide, with a projecting Greek temple front with six fluted Doric columns supporting an entablature and gabled pediment. Ground floor windows are long behind the temple front, and the second floor has a balcony stretching across its width. A secondary entrance on the north side (facing College Street) is sheltered by a portico. The roof is adorned by a square cupola which was added in the 1880s.

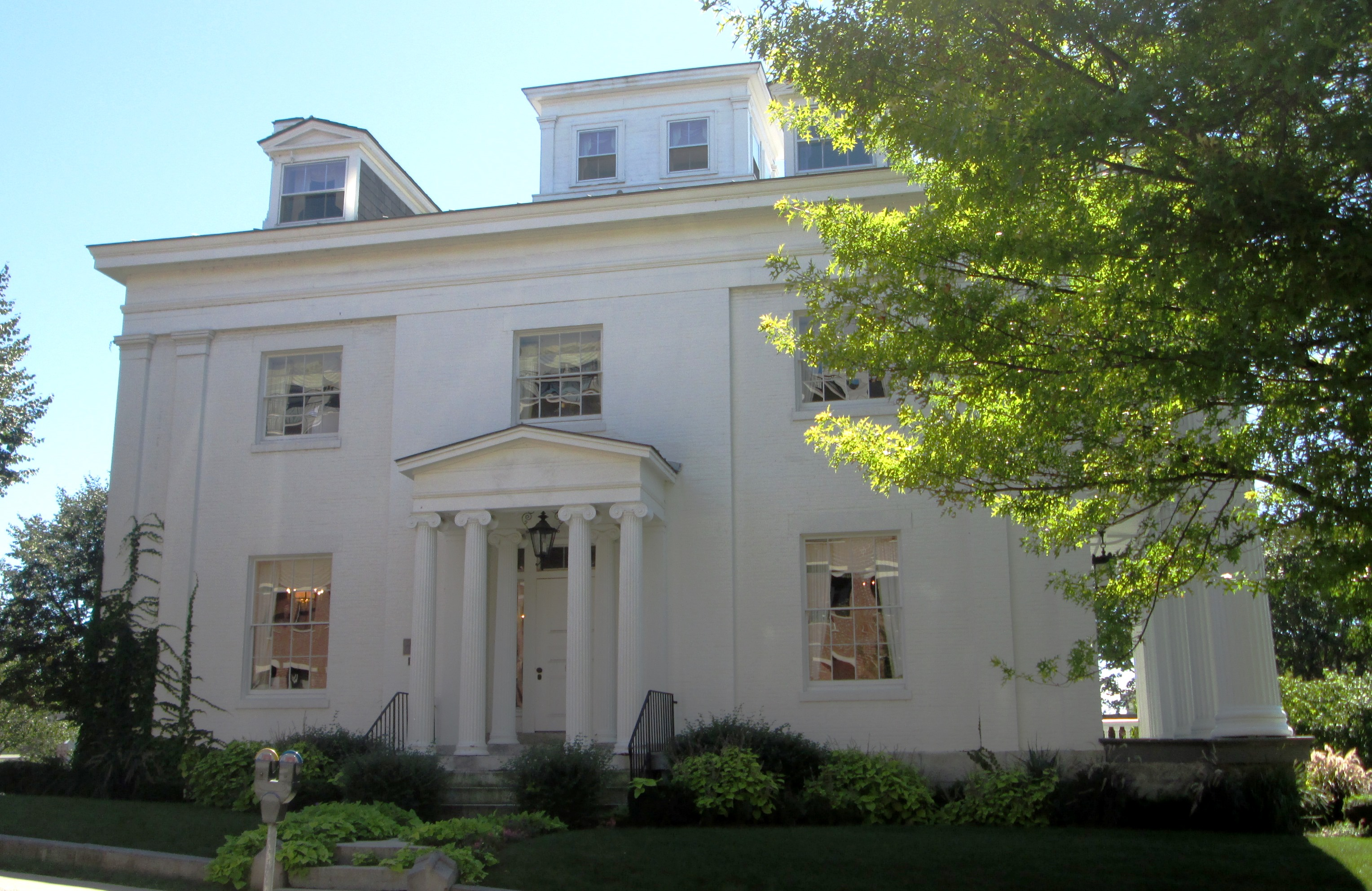
Side of the building

The house was built in 1840 for Timothy Follett (1793–1857), a real estate developer and later a railroad executive. It was designed by Ammi B. Young, whose other credits include the Vermont State House. Follett lost his fortune in the 1850s when the Rutland Railroad went bankrupt, and the house was owned by a series of executives, ending with Dr. B.S. Nichols, a local industrialist. Since 1885 the house has had a variety of institutional owners, including the local chapter of the Veterans of Foreign Wars. It is one of the state's finest examples of Greek Revival architecture, and is that last surviving mansion of a series that once stood facing the waterfront.

== See also ==
- National Register of Historic Places listings in Chittenden County, Vermont
