= Higgins, Texas =

- City
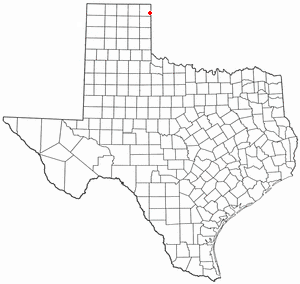
- Location of Higgins, Texas

- Coordinates: 36°07′16″N 100°01′39″W
- Country: United States
- State: Texas
- County: Lipscomb

Area
  - Total: 1.11 sq mi (2.87 km^{2})
  - Land: 1.11 sq mi (2.87 km^{2})
  - Water: 0 sq mi (0.00 km^{2})
- Elevation: 2,549 ft (777 m)

Population (2020)
  - Total: 356
  - Density: 321/sq mi (124/km^{2})
- Time zone: UTC-6 (Central (CST))
  - Summer (DST): UTC-5 (CDT)
- ZIP code: 79046
- Area code: 806
- FIPS code: 48-33608
- GNIS feature ID: 2410758

Higgins is a city in Lipscomb County, Texas, United States, named after G.H. Higgins, a stockholder in the Santa Fe Railroad, which served the community. Its population was 356 at the 2020 census.

== History ==
In 1893, Higgins had a triweekly mail route sent through the Grand, Oklahoma, post office, from Ioland, Oklahoma.

== Geography ==
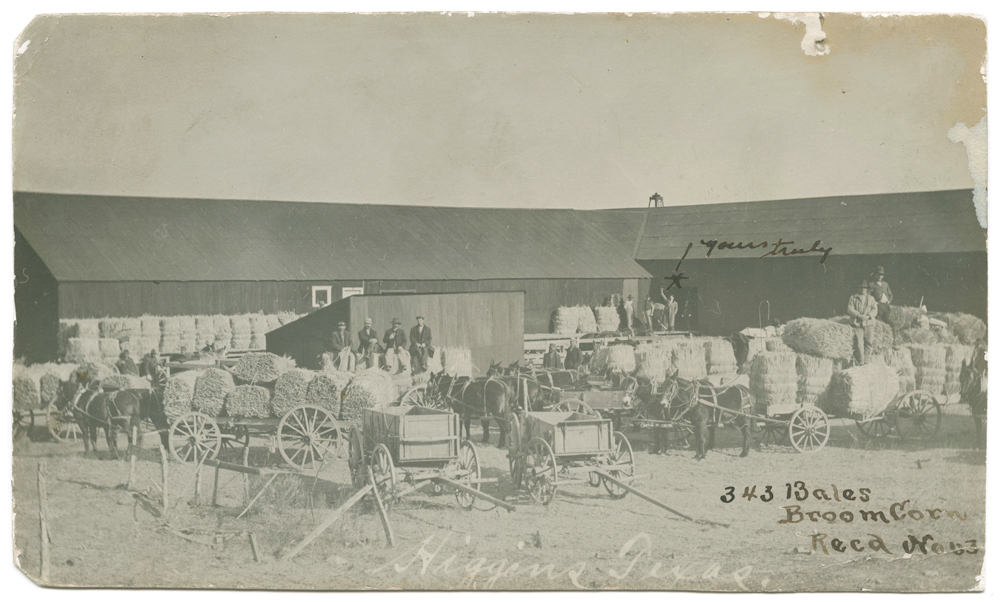
Higgins 1907–1918.

According to the United States Census Bureau, the city has a total area of 1.1 square miles (2.8 km^{2}), all land.

== Demographics ==
Historical population
Census	Pop.	Note	%±
1910	769		—
1920	688		−10.5%
1930	812		18.0%
1940	741		−8.7%
1950	675		−8.9%
1960	711		5.3%
1970	582		−18.1%
1980	702		20.6%
1990	464		−33.9%
2000	425		−8.4%
2010	397		−6.6%
2020	356		−10.3%
U.S. Decennial Census; 2020 Census

=== 2020 census ===
As of the 2020 census, Higgins had a population of 356. The median age was 47.5 years; 22.2% of residents were under 18 and 26.1% were 65 or older. For every 100 females, there were 87.4 males, and for every 100 females 18 and over, there were 91.0 males 18 and over.

None of residents lived in urban areas, while 100.0% lived in rural areas.

Of the 161 households in Higgins, 25.5% had children under 18 living in them, 46.0% were married-couple households, 18.6% were households with a male householder and no spouse or partner present, and 28.6% were households with a female householder and no spouse or partner present. About 34.1% of all households were made up of individuals, and 19.2% had someone living alone who was 65 or older.

The city had 231 housing units, of which 30.3% were vacant. The homeowner vacancy rate was 5.0% and the rental vacancy rate was 34.8%.

Racial composition as of the 2020 census
Race	Number	Percentage
White	297	83.4%
American Indian and Alaska Native	11	3.1%
Some other race	11	3.1%
Two or more races	37	10.4%
Hispanic or Latino (of any race)	35	9.8%

=== 2000 census ===
As of the 2000 census, 425 people, 198 households, and 116 families resided in the city. The population density was 389 inhabitants per square mile (150/km^{2}). The 253 housing units had an average density of 231 per square mile (89/km^{2}). The racial makeup of the city was 90.82% White, 0.94% African American, 2.59% Native American, 3.29% from other races, and 2.35% from two or more races. Hispanics or Latinos of any race were 4.94% of the population.

Of the 198 households, 19.2% had children under 18 living with them, 52.0% were married couples living together, 6.1% had a female householder with no husband present, and 41.4% were not families. Some 38.4% of all households were made up of individuals, and 26.3% had someone living alone who was 65 or older. The average household size was 2.15, and the average family size was 2.90.

In the city, the age distribution was 20.2% under 18, 4.2% from 18 to 24, 18.6% from 25 to 44, 30.4% from 45 to 64, and 26.6% who were 65 or older. The median age was 48 years. For every 100 females, there were 94.1 males. For every 100 females 18 and over, there were 87.3 males.

The median income in the city for a household was $25,714 and for a family was $32,875. Males had a median income of $17,917 versus $20,250 for females. The per capita income for the city was $16,164. About 17.8% of families and 21.1% of the population were below the poverty line, including 40.0% of those under 18 and 16.0% of those 65 or over.

== Education ==
The City of Higgins has been served by the Canadian Independent School District since July 1, 2020, when it absorbed the Higgins Independent School District. The former operates Canadian High School, and the latter previously operated Higgins School.

== Climate ==
According to the Köppen climate classification, Higgins has a semiarid climate, BSk on climate maps.
