= Follett Independent School District =

School district in Texas

Coordinates: 36.4338°N 100.1393°W

Follett Independent School District is a public school district based in Follett, Texas, United States. The district has one school that serves students in prekindergarten through 12th grade.

== History ==
The district switched to a four-day school week for most, but not all weeks, in the fall of 2022

== Academic achievement ==
In 2009, the school district was rated "recognized" by the Texas Education Agency.

== Athletics ==
Follett won the 1974 state eight-man football championship and finished as the 1975 runner-up (the 1975 season was the last time that the eight-man title was contested as a UIL event). Follett High School now plays six-man football.

== See also ==
- List of school districts in Texas
