= Booker, Texas =

Town in Lipscomb and Ochiltree counties in Texas, United States

- Town
- Interactive map of Booker, Texas
- Coordinates: 36°27′22″N 100°32′25″W
- Country: United States
- State: Texas
- Counties: Lipscomb, Ochiltree

Area
  - Total: 1.05 sq mi (2.73 km^{2})
  - Land: 1.05 sq mi (2.73 km^{2})
  - Water: 0 sq mi (0.00 km^{2})
- Elevation: 2,832 ft (863 m)

Population (2020)
  - Total: 1,437
  - Density: 1,360/sq mi (526/km^{2})
- Time zone: UTC-6 (Central (CST))
  - Summer (DST): UTC-5 (CDT)
- ZIP code: 79005
- Area code: 806
- FIPS code: 48-09448
- GNIS feature ID: 2411708
- Website: www.bookertexas.com

Booker is a town in Lipscomb and Ochiltree Counties in Texas, United States. Its population was 1,437 as of the 2020 Census. It was named for B.F. Booker, a civil engineer for the Panhandle and Santa Fe Railway.

== History ==
Booker was founded seven miles north of where it currently sits, as LaKemp, Oklahoma, in 1909. Ten years later, though, when the Panhandle and Santa Fe Railway was built from Shattuck, Oklahoma, to Spearman, Texas, the entire town moved seven miles across the state line to be near the railroad. The town was platted shortly before the move in 1917 by Thomas C. Spearman, who had Spearman named after him. LaKemp was renamed Booker in honor of one of the engineers for the railroad. Around 2007, the then-operator of the railroad line, the Southwestern Railroad, abandoned the railway.

== Geography ==
Booker is incorporated in Lipscomb County, and most of its territory lies in the northwestern corner of that county; only a small portion extends west into Ochiltree County.

According to the United States Census Bureau, the town has a total area of 1.0 square mile (2.7 km^{2}), all land.

== Climate ==
According to the Köppen climate classification, Booker has a semiarid climate, BSk on climate maps.

== Demographics ==
=== 2020 census ===
Booker racial composition (NH = Non-Hispanic) (Note: Note: the US Census treats Hispanic/Latino as an ethnic category. This table excludes Latinos from the racial categories and assigns them to a separate category. Hispanics/Latinos can be of any race.)
Race	Number	Percentage
White (NH)	542	37.72%
Black or African American (NH)	3	0.21%
Native American or Alaska Native (NH)	9	0.63%
Asian (NH)	1	0.07%
Multiracial (NH)	30	2.09%
Hispanic or Latino	852	59.29%
Total	1,437	

As of the 2020 United States census, 1,437 people, 496 households, and 389 families resided in the town.

=== 2000 census ===
Historical population
Census	Pop.	Note	%±
1930	495		—
1940	386		−22.0%
1950	619		60.4%
1960	817		32.0%
1970	904		10.6%
1980	1,219		34.8%
1990	1,236		1.4%
2000	1,315		6.4%
2010	1,516		15.3%
2020	1,437		−5.2%
U.S. Decennial Census

As of the census of 2000, 1,315 people, 455 households, and 342 families lived in the town. The population density was 1,260.3 inhabitants per square mile (486.6/km^{2}). The 541 housing units had an average density of 518.5 per square mile (200.2/km^{2}). The racial makeup of the town was 71.48% White, 0.46% African American, 0.76% Native American, 0.15% Asian, 24.56% from other races, and 2.59% from two or more races. Hispanic or Latino people of any race were 38.71% of the population.

Of the 455 households, 43.3% had children under18 living with them, 63.7% were married couples living together, 8.4% had a female householder with no husband present, and 24.8% were not families. About 23.1% of all households were made up of individuals, and 11.0% had someone living alone who was 65 or older. The average household size was 2.79 and the average family size was 3.29.

In the town, the population was spread out, with 31.6% under the age of 18, 8.2% from 18 to 24, 28.8% from 25 to 44, 16.8% from 45 to 64, and 14.5% who were 65 years of age or older. The median age was 33 years. For every 100 females, there were 94.2 males. For every 100 females age 18 and over, there were 90.5 males.

The median income for a household in the town was $31,696 and for a family was $39,904. Males had a median income of $28,125 versus $20,677 for females. The per capita income for the town was $13,620. About 15.8% of families and 20.5% of the population were below the poverty line, including 27.4% of those under 18 and 8.3% of those 65 or over.

== Roads and streets ==
Booker is located at the intersection of Texas State Highway 15 (east-west) and Texas State Highway 23 (north-south). The town has billboards on the western and eastern edges of town along State 15 that read "Booker: Next 9 Exits", which is a reference to all the streets that run north-south that meet the highway as it passes through the locale.

The streets of the town are arranged in a regular manner alphabetically and categorically in the "south of the railroad tracks" side of town. The north–south streets west of Main Street are named after flowers and trees. Streets on the east side are names of Texas cities and historical figures with the exception of one street.

== Education ==
The town is served by the Booker Independent School District.

== Notable persons ==
- Brent Guy, former head football coach at Utah State University and former defensive coordinator for the University of Tulsa

== See also ==
- List of municipalities in Texas
