= Canadian, Texas =

- City
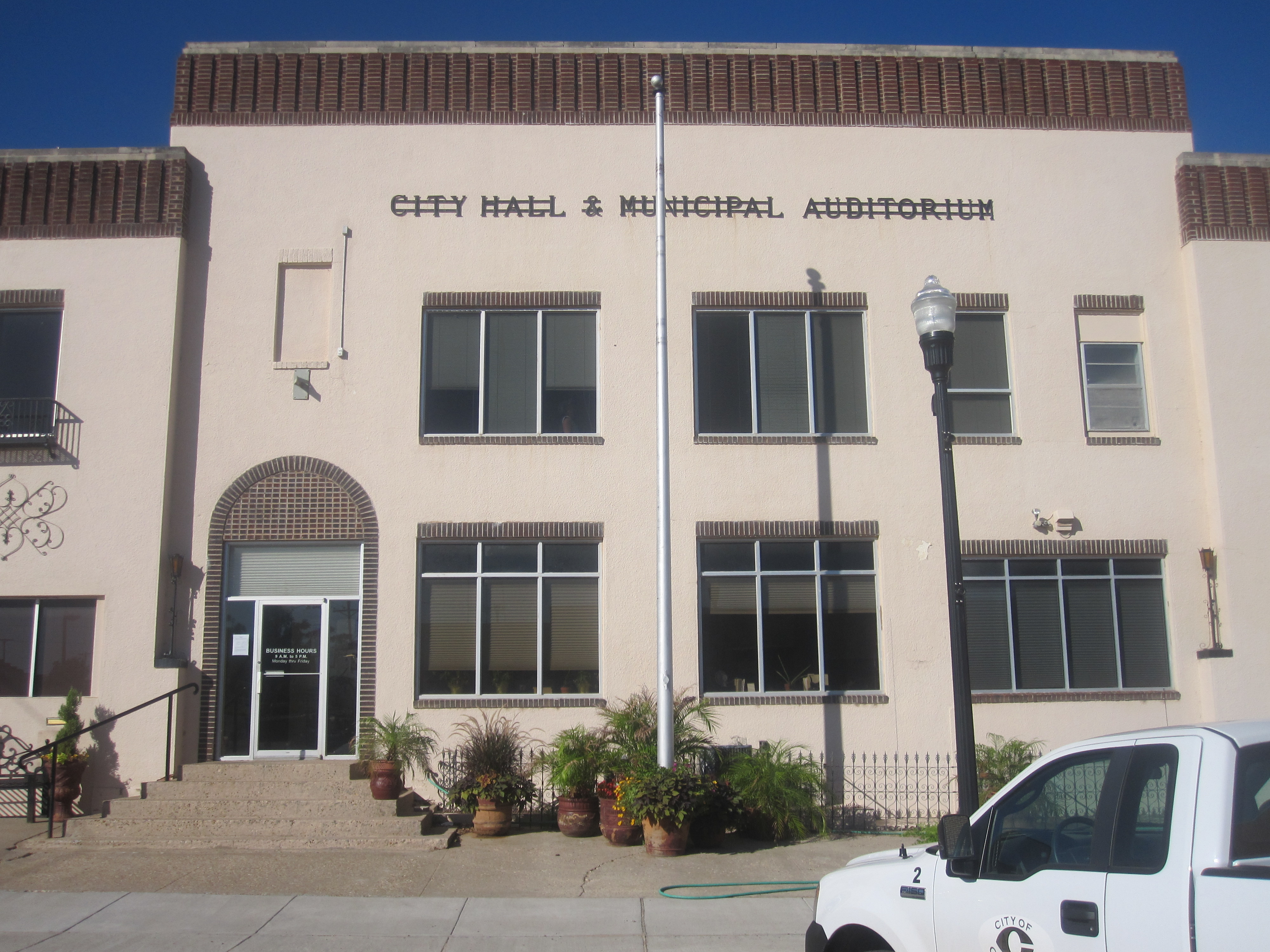
- City Hall and Municipal Auditorium

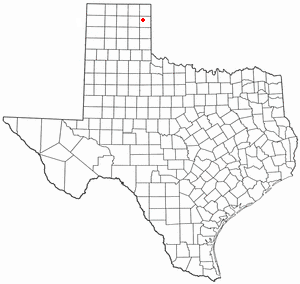
- Location of Canadian, Texas

- Coordinates: 35°54′39″N 100°23′00″W
- Country: United States
- State: Texas
- County: Hemphill

Area
  - Total: 1.30 sq mi (3.36 km^{2})
  - Land: 1.30 sq mi (3.36 km^{2})
  - Water: 0 sq mi (0.00 km^{2})
- Elevation: 2,431 ft (741 m)

Population (2020)
  - Total: 2,339
  - Density: 1,800/sq mi (696/km^{2})
- Time zone: UTC-6 (Central (CST))
  - Summer (DST): UTC-5 (CDT)
- ZIP code: 79014
- Area code: 806
- FIPS code: 48-12412
- GNIS feature ID: 2409973
- Website: www.canadiantx.com

Canadian is a city in and the county seat of Hemphill County, Texas, United States. The population was 2,339 at the 2020 census, down from 2,649 in 2010. It is named for the nearby Canadian River, a tributary of the Arkansas River. Incorporated in 1908, Canadian is sometimes called "the oasis of the High Plains". Canadian is on the eastern side of the Texas Panhandle, close to the border with Oklahoma.

== History ==
In 1887, the city government began.

A portion of the Tom Hanks movie Cast Away was filmed in Canadian.

In February 2024, most of the town was in the path of the 1,058,482 acre (428,352 ha) Smokehouse Creek Fire, which charred some of the town. No fatalities were reported within Canadian.

== Geography ==
Canadian is northwest of the center of Hemphill County, 1 mile (1.6 km) south of where Red Deer Creek joins the Canadian River. U.S. Routes 60 and 83 pass through the center of town as Second Street. US 60 leads northeast 162 miles (261 km) to Enid, Oklahoma, and southwest 101 miles (163 km) to Amarillo, while US 83 leads northwest 46 miles (74 km) to Perryton and south 51 miles (82 km) to Shamrock.

According to the U.S. Census Bureau, Canadian has a total area of 1.3 square miles (3.4 km^{2}), all land.

Nic Garcia of the Texas Tribune characterized Canadian as having "a sense of isolation."

=== Climate ===
Canadian has a cool semi-arid climate (Köppen BSk) that is almost wet enough to qualify as a humid subtropical climate (Cfa).

Climate data for Canadian, Texas
Month	Jan	Feb	Mar	Apr	May	Jun	Jul	Aug	Sep	Oct	Nov	Dec	Year
Record high °F (°C)	85 (29)	90 (32)	95 (35)	99 (37)	105 (41)	112 (44)	111 (44)	110 (43)	108 (42)	101 (38)	90 (32)	89 (32)	112 (44)
Mean daily maximum °F (°C)	47 (8)	54 (12)	62 (17)	71 (22)	79 (26)	88 (31)	94 (34)	93 (34)	85 (29)	74 (23)	59 (15)	48 (9)	71 (22)
Mean daily minimum °F (°C)	19 (−7)	23 (−5)	30 (−1)	41 (5)	52 (11)	62 (17)	66 (19)	65 (18)	56 (13)	43 (6)	30 (−1)	21 (−6)	42 (6)
Record low °F (°C)	−14 (−26)	−14 (−26)	−4 (−20)	15 (−9)	24 (−4)	39 (4)	47 (8)	45 (7)	27 (−3)	11 (−12)	−2 (−19)	−13 (−25)	−14 (−26)
Average precipitation inches (mm)	0.46 (12)	0.75 (19)	1.70 (43)	1.72 (44)	3.75 (95)	3.33 (85)	2.19 (56)	2.36 (60)	2.36 (60)	1.47 (37)	0.94 (24)	0.69 (18)	21.72 (553)
Average snowfall inches (cm)	3.80 (9.7)	2.40 (6.1)	1.90 (4.8)	0.30 (0.76)	0 (0)	0 (0)	0 (0)	0 (0)	0 (0)	0.10 (0.25)	1.00 (2.5)	7.00 (17.8)	16.50 (41.9)

== Demographics ==
Historical population
Census	Pop.	Note	%±
1910	1,648		—
1920	2,187		32.7%
1930	2,068		−5.4%
1940	2,151		4.0%
1950	2,700		25.5%
1960	2,239		−17.1%
1970	2,292		2.4%
1980	3,491		52.3%
1990	2,417		−30.8%
2000	2,233		−7.6%
2010	2,649		18.6%
2020	2,339		−11.7%
1930-2000,

=== 2020 census ===
As of the 2020 census, Canadian had a population of 2,339 and a median age of 36.2 years. 30.6% of residents were under the age of 18 and 15.2% of residents were 65 years of age or older. For every 100 females there were 99.7 males, and for every 100 females age 18 and over there were 96.0 males age 18 and over. 0% of residents lived in urban areas while 100.0% lived in rural areas.

There were 832 households in Canadian, of which 42.4% had children under the age of 18 living in them. Of all households, 60.1% were married-couple households, 15.9% were households with a male householder and no spouse or partner present, and 20.7% were households with a female householder and no spouse or partner present. About 22.7% of all households were made up of individuals and 12.2% had someone living alone who was 65 years of age or older.

There were 1,084 housing units, of which 23.2% were vacant. Among occupied housing units, 77.3% were owner-occupied and 22.7% were renter-occupied. The homeowner vacancy rate was 3.5% and the rental vacancy rate was 32.9%.

Racial composition as of the 2020 census
Race	Percent
White	64.3%
Black or African American	0.1%
American Indian and Alaska Native	0.9%
Asian	0.3%
Native Hawaiian and Other Pacific Islander	0%
Some other race	18.0%
Two or more races	16.5%
Hispanic or Latino (of any race)	41.0%

=== 2000 census ===
As of the census of 2000, 2,233 people, 869 households, and 625 families resided in the city. The population density was 1,731 inhabitants per square mile (668/km^{2}). The 1,047 housing units averaged 811.6 per square mile (313.4/km^{2}). The racial makeup of the city was 88.94% White, 0.22% African American, 0.76% Native American, 0.13% Asian, 0.04% Pacific Islander, 9.00% from other races, and 0.90% from two or more races. Hispanics or Latinos of any race were 18.76% of the population.

Of the 869 households, 35.0% had children under the age of 18 living with them, 60.9% were married couples living together, 7.6% had a female householder with no husband present, and 28.0% were not families. About 26.1% of all households were made up of individuals, and 13.5% had someone living alone who was 65 years of age or older. The average household size was 2.52 and the average family size was 3.04.

In the city, the population was distributed as 27.5% under the age of 18, 7.2% from 18 to 24, 26.8% from 25 to 44, 22.9% from 45 to 64, and 15.5% who were 65 years of age or older. The median age was 38 years. For every 100 females, there were 91.7 males. For every 100 females age 18 and over, there were 87.0 males.

The median income for a household in the city was $31,929, and for a family was $38,676. Males had a median income of $30,240 versus $17,083 for females. The per capita income for the city was $16,384. About 12.3% of families and 14.1% of the population were below the poverty line, including 19.4% of those under age 18 and 16.4% of those age 65 or over.

== Education ==
The City of Canadian is served by the Canadian Independent School District.

== Media ==
The Canadian Record was a weekly newspaper published from 1891 to 2023.

== Culture ==
In 2023 Nic Garcia described the character of the residents as "tough but empathetic. Forward-looking yet conservative."

== Notable people ==
- Malouf Abraham Sr. (1915–1994), businessman and politician
- Ken King (born 1971), businessman and politician
- Dave McCurdy (born 1950), businessman and politician
- Richard A. Waterfield (1939–2007), rancher and politician
- Robert R. Young (1897–1958), businessman

== Gallery ==
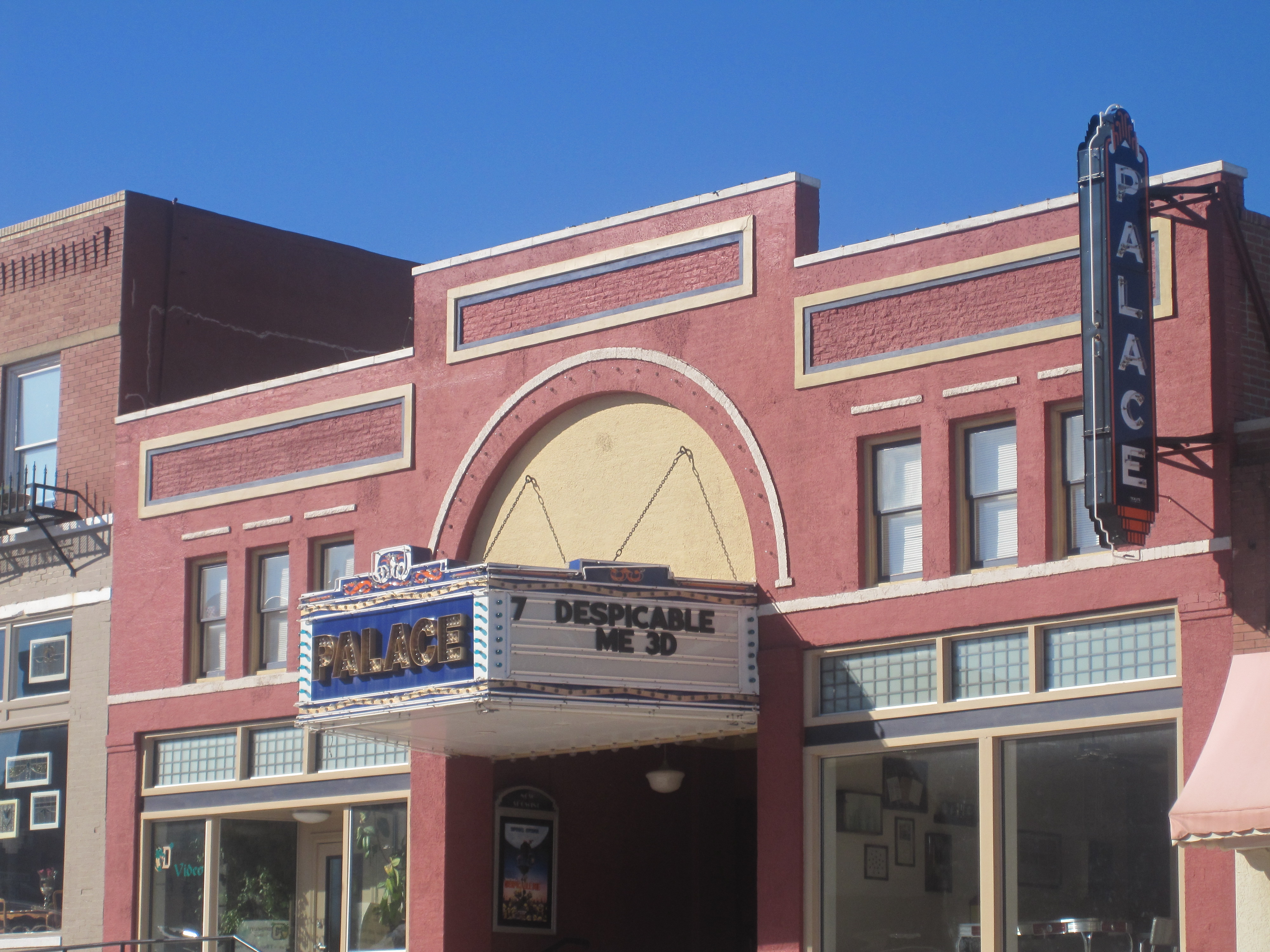
Palace Theater in downtown Canadian

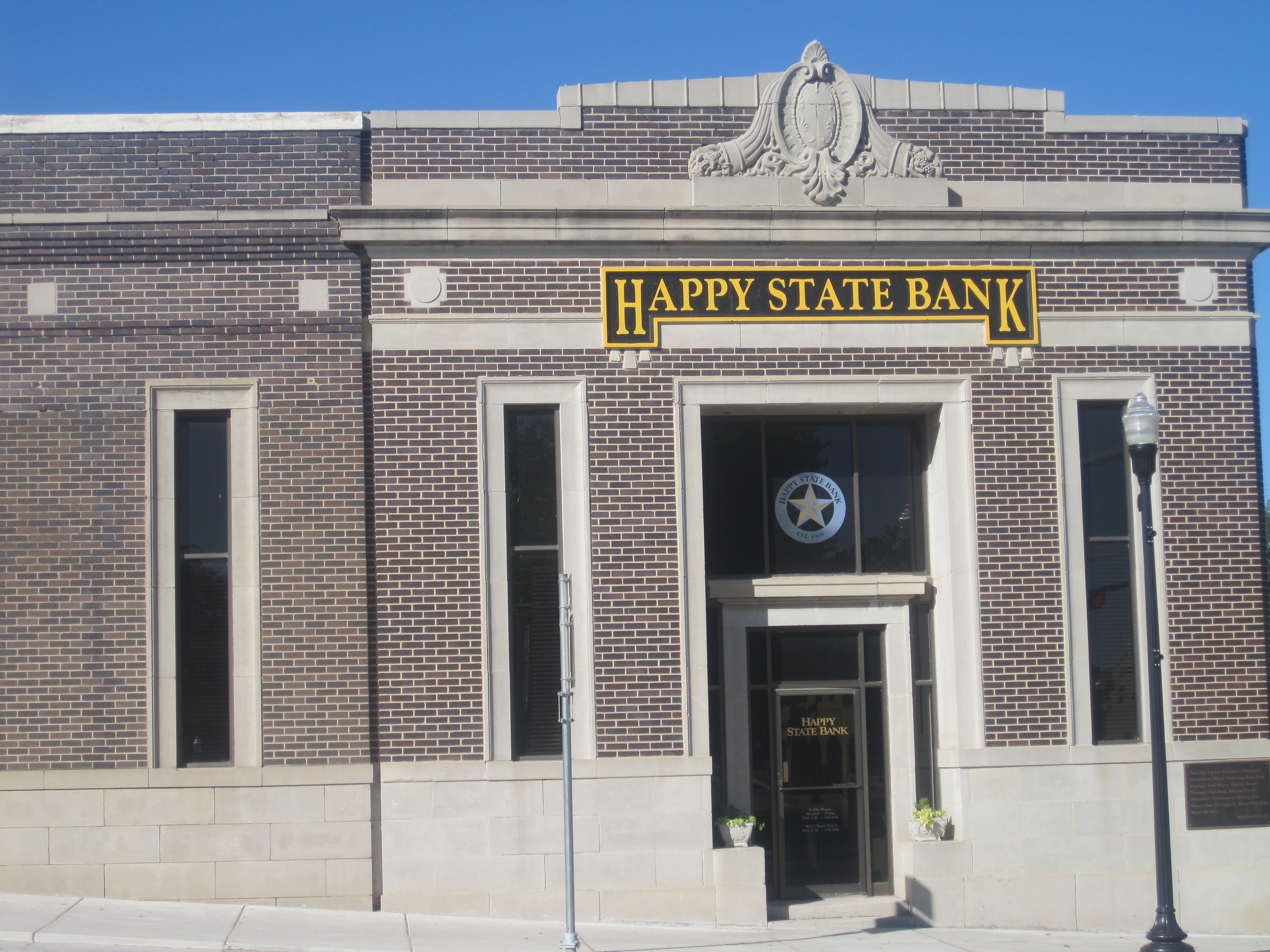
Happy State Bank and Trust

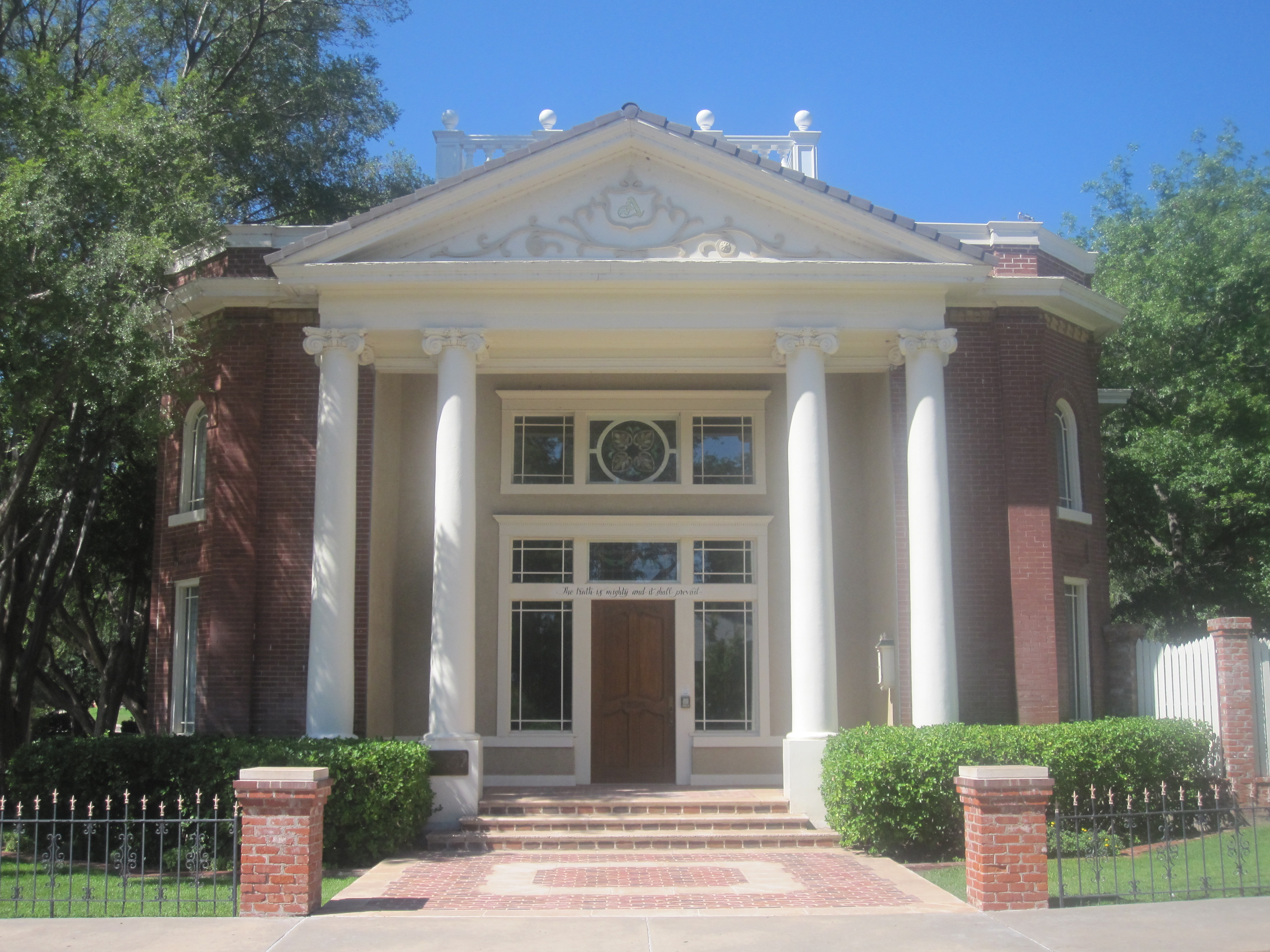
Malouf Abraham Jr.'s Citadelle Art Foundation
