= Lipscomb, Texas =

- Census-designated place
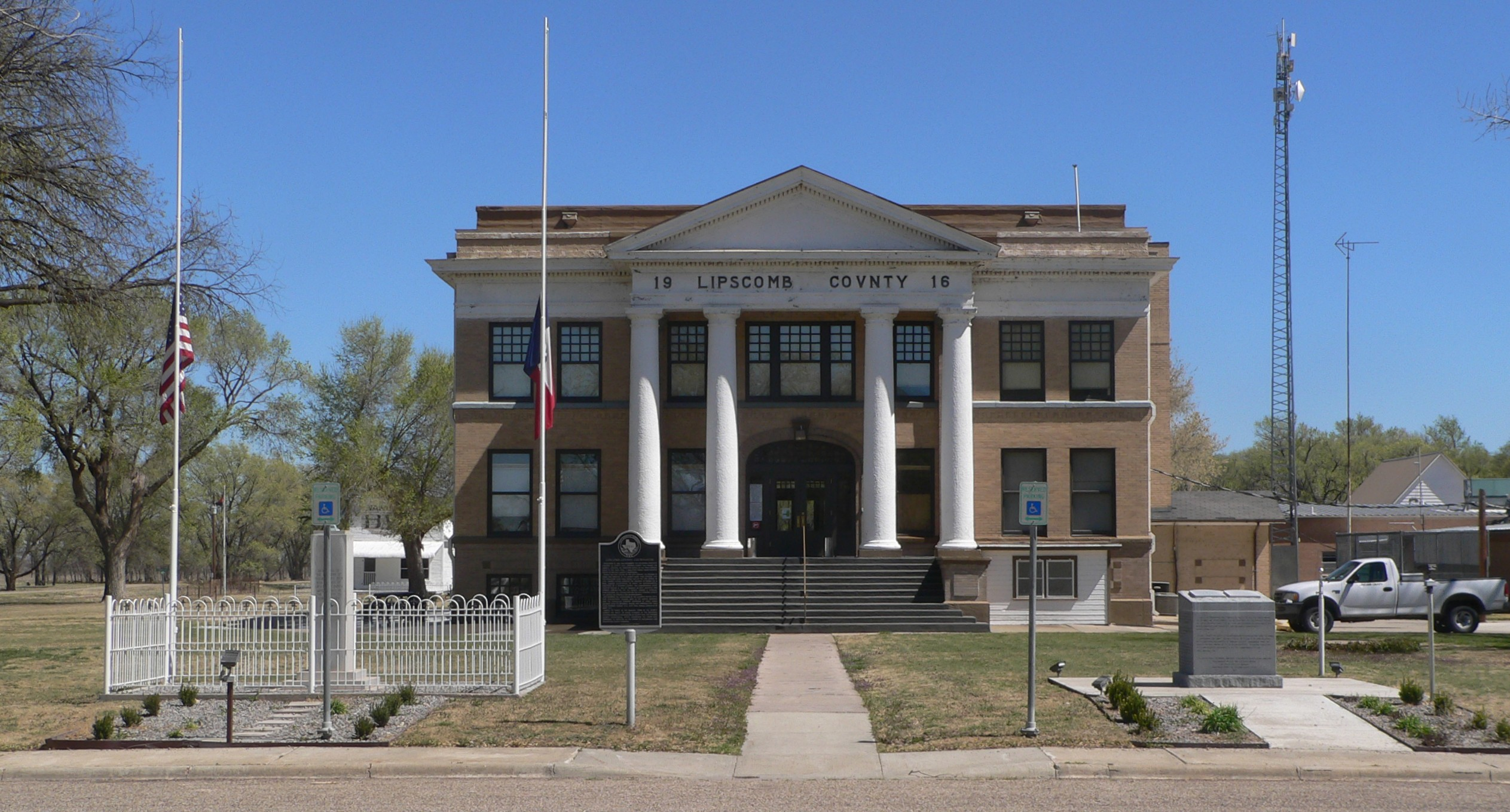
- Lipscomb County Courthouse

- Location within Lipscomb County and Texas
- Coordinates: 36°13′18″N 100°15′40″W
- Country: United States
- State: Texas
- County: Lipscomb

Area
  - Total: 3.75 sq mi (9.72 km^{2})
  - Land: 3.75 sq mi (9.72 km^{2})
  - Water: 0 sq mi (0.0 km^{2})
- Elevation: 2,464 ft (751 m)

Population (2020)
  - Total: 66
  - Density: 18/sq mi (6.8/km^{2})
- Time zone: UTC-6 (Central (CST))
  - Summer (DST): UTC-5 (CDT)
- ZIP code: 79056
- Area code: 806
- FIPS code: 48-42952
- GNIS feature ID: 2408616

Lipscomb (/ˈlɪpskəm/ LIP-skəm) is an unincorporated community and census-designated place (CDP) in and the county seat of Lipscomb County, Texas, United States. The population was 66 at the 2020 census.

== Geography ==
Lipscomb is located south of the center of Lipscomb County. Texas State Highway 305 forms the western edge of the community; the highway leads north 16 miles (26 km) to Darrouzett and south 15 miles (24 km) to Glazier.

According to the United States Census Bureau, the CDP has a total area of 3.7 square miles (9.7 km^{2}), all land. Wolf Creek forms the northern border of the community; the creek flows east into Oklahoma to join the North Canadian River.

=== Climate ===
According to the Köppen Climate Classification system, Lipscomb has a semi-arid climate, abbreviated "BSk" on climate maps.

Climate data for Lipscomb, Texas, 1991–2020 normals, extremes 1963–present
Month	Jan	Feb	Mar	Apr	May	Jun	Jul	Aug	Sep	Oct	Nov	Dec	Year
Record high °F (°C)	84 (29)	90 (32)	95 (35)	100 (38)	105 (41)	114 (46)	114 (46)	110 (43)	108 (42)	103 (39)	92 (33)	81 (27)	114 (46)
Mean maximum °F (°C)	74.1 (23.4)	78.0 (25.6)	86.6 (30.3)	91.4 (33.0)	96.2 (35.7)	101.2 (38.4)	104.4 (40.2)	103.5 (39.7)	98.9 (37.2)	93.5 (34.2)	82.8 (28.2)	72.8 (22.7)	106.4 (41.3)
Mean daily maximum °F (°C)	49.9 (9.9)	53.4 (11.9)	63.2 (17.3)	71.4 (21.9)	80.1 (26.7)	89.3 (31.8)	94.5 (34.7)	93.1 (33.9)	85.3 (29.6)	73.7 (23.2)	61.2 (16.2)	50.3 (10.2)	72.1 (22.3)
Daily mean °F (°C)	33.9 (1.1)	36.9 (2.7)	46.5 (8.1)	55.3 (12.9)	65.2 (18.4)	75.2 (24.0)	79.8 (26.6)	78.2 (25.7)	69.9 (21.1)	57.2 (14.0)	44.4 (6.9)	34.7 (1.5)	56.4 (13.6)
Mean daily minimum °F (°C)	17.9 (−7.8)	20.5 (−6.4)	29.8 (−1.2)	39.1 (3.9)	50.2 (10.1)	61.0 (16.1)	65.1 (18.4)	63.4 (17.4)	54.4 (12.4)	40.7 (4.8)	27.7 (−2.4)	19.0 (−7.2)	40.7 (4.8)
Mean minimum °F (°C)	3.4 (−15.9)	5.5 (−14.7)	12.7 (−10.7)	23.4 (−4.8)	34.1 (1.2)	48.8 (9.3)	56.4 (13.6)	54.0 (12.2)	39.3 (4.1)	24.1 (−4.4)	11.2 (−11.6)	4.1 (−15.5)	−1.7 (−18.7)
Record low °F (°C)	−19 (−28)	−19 (−28)	−6 (−21)	12 (−11)	24 (−4)	40 (4)	45 (7)	44 (7)	27 (−3)	10 (−12)	1 (−17)	−16 (−27)	−19 (−28)
Average precipitation inches (mm)	0.62 (16)	0.61 (15)	1.41 (36)	1.89 (48)	3.07 (78)	3.46 (88)	2.40 (61)	2.92 (74)	1.78 (45)	2.30 (58)	0.94 (24)	1.16 (29)	22.56 (572)
Average snowfall inches (cm)	2.0 (5.1)	1.2 (3.0)	1.4 (3.6)	0.1 (0.25)	0.0 (0.0)	0.0 (0.0)	0.0 (0.0)	0.0 (0.0)	0.0 (0.0)	0.7 (1.8)	1.1 (2.8)	3.2 (8.1)	9.7 (24.65)
Average precipitation days (≥ 0.01 in)	2.2	2.9	3.8	4.9	6.6	7.0	6.1	6.5	4.8	4.9	3.2	3.1	56.0
Average snowy days (≥ 0.1 in)	0.7	0.5	0.5	0.0	0.0	0.0	0.0	0.0	0.0	0.2	0.4	0.7	3.0
Source 1: NOAA
Source 2: National Weather Service

== Demographics ==
Historical population
Census	Pop.	Note	%±
2000	44		—
2010	37		−15.9%
2020	66		78.4%
U.S. Decennial Census; 1850–1900 1910; 1920 1930 1940; 1950 1960 1970; 1980 1990 2000; 2010

Lipscomb first appeared as a census designated place in the 2000 U.S. census.

=== 2020 census ===
Lipscomb CDP, Texas – Racial and ethnic composition Note: the US Census treats Hispanic/Latino as an ethnic category. This table excludes Latinos from the racial categories and assigns them to a separate category. Hispanics/Latinos may be of any race.
Race / Ethnicity (NH = Non-Hispanic)	Pop 2000	Pop 2010	Pop 2020	% 2000	% 2010	% 2020
White alone (NH)	40	35	57	90.91%	94.59%	86.36%
Black or African American alone (NH)	0	0	1	0.00%	0.00%	1.52%
Native American or Alaska Native alone (NH)	4	1	2	9.09%	2.70%	3.03%
Asian alone (NH)	0	0	0	0.00%	0.00%	0.00%
Native Hawaiian or Pacific Islander alone (NH)	0	0	0	0.00%	0.00%	0.00%
Other race alone (NH)	0	0	0	0.00%	0.00%	0.00%
Mixed race or Multiracial (NH)	0	0	4	0.00%	0.00%	6.06%
Hispanic or Latino (any race)	0	1	2	0.00%	2.70%	3.03%
Total	44	37	66	100.00%	100.00%	100.00%

As of the 2020 United States census, there were 66 people, 21 households, and 3 families residing in the CDP.

=== 2000 census ===
As of the census of 2000, there were 44 people, 25 households, and 14 families living in the CDP. The population density was 8.6 people per square mile (3.3/km^{2}). There were 35 housing units at an average density of 6.9/sq mi (2.6/km^{2}). The racial makeup of the CDP was 90.91% White and 9.09% Native American.

There were 25 households, out of which 4.0% had children under the age of 18 living with them, 52.0% were married couples living together, and 44.0% were non-families. 44.0% of all households were made up of individuals, and 28.0% had someone living alone who was 65 years of age or older. The average household size was 1.72 and the average family size was 2.29.

In the CDP the population was spread out, with 4.5% under the age of 18, 6.8% from 18 to 24, 18.2% from 25 to 44, 34.1% from 45 to 64, and 36.4% who were 65 years of age or older. The median age was 58 years. For every 100 females there were 120.0 males. For every 100 females age 18 and over, there were 110.0 males.

The median income for a household in the CDP was $38,750, and the median income for a family was $58,125. Males had a median income of $35,625 versus $23,750 for females. The per capita income for the CDP was $21,144. There were 9.1% of families and 7.5% of the population living below the poverty line, including no under eighteens and 30.0% of those over 64.

== Education ==
Lipscomb is served by the Canadian Independent School District.
