= Follett, Texas =

- City
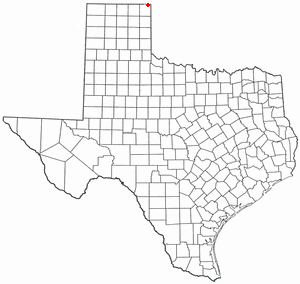
- Location of Follett, Texas

- Coordinates: 36°26′02″N 100°08′27″W
- Country: United States
- State: Texas
- County: Lipscomb

Area
  - Total: 0.97 sq mi (2.52 km^{2})
  - Land: 0.97 sq mi (2.52 km^{2})
  - Water: 0 sq mi (0.00 km^{2})
- Elevation: 2,608 ft (795 m)

Population (2020)
  - Total: 373
  - Density: 383/sq mi (148/km^{2})
- Time zone: UTC-6 (Central (CST))
  - Summer (DST): UTC-5 (CDT)
- ZIP code: 79034
- Area code: 806
- FIPS code: 48-26328
- GNIS feature ID: 2410515
- Website: www.cityoffollett.com

Follett is a city in Lipscomb County, Texas, United States, which was established in 1917 by Santa Fe railroad official Thomas C. Spearman as a townsite on the North Texas and Santa Fe Railway. It was named for Horace Follett, a locating engineer for the line. The population was 373 at the 2020 census.

== Geography ==
According to the United States Census Bureau, the town has a total area of 1.0 square mile (2.6 km^{2}), all land.

=== Climate ===
According to the Köppen climate classification, Follett has a semiarid climate, BSk on climate maps. The hottest temperature recorded in Follett was 112 °F (44.4 °C) on July 20, 2022, while the coldest temperature recorded was −18 °F (−27.8 °C) on December 22, 1989.

Climate data for Follett, Texas, 1991–2020 normals, extremes 1934–present
Month	Jan	Feb	Mar	Apr	May	Jun	Jul	Aug	Sep	Oct	Nov	Dec	Year
Record high °F (°C)	82 (28)	93 (34)	101 (38)	98 (37)	104 (40)	111 (44)	112 (44)	110 (43)	107 (42)	102 (39)	90 (32)	84 (29)	112 (44)
Mean maximum °F (°C)	71.4 (21.9)	77.2 (25.1)	84.8 (29.3)	89.7 (32.1)	93.8 (34.3)	99.1 (37.3)	101.7 (38.7)	101.3 (38.5)	96.4 (35.8)	90.6 (32.6)	78.5 (25.8)	70.4 (21.3)	103.7 (39.8)
Mean daily maximum °F (°C)	48.6 (9.2)	52.6 (11.4)	62.2 (16.8)	70.9 (21.6)	79.8 (26.6)	88.7 (31.5)	93.3 (34.1)	92.2 (33.4)	84.6 (29.2)	72.5 (22.5)	60.2 (15.7)	49.4 (9.7)	71.3 (21.8)
Daily mean °F (°C)	35.7 (2.1)	38.8 (3.8)	47.5 (8.6)	56.0 (13.3)	66.0 (18.9)	75.5 (24.2)	80.1 (26.7)	78.9 (26.1)	71.2 (21.8)	58.8 (14.9)	46.6 (8.1)	37.0 (2.8)	57.7 (14.3)
Mean daily minimum °F (°C)	22.8 (−5.1)	25.0 (−3.9)	32.9 (0.5)	41.0 (5.0)	52.2 (11.2)	62.3 (16.8)	66.9 (19.4)	65.6 (18.7)	57.8 (14.3)	45.0 (7.2)	32.9 (0.5)	24.7 (−4.1)	44.1 (6.7)
Mean minimum °F (°C)	6.0 (−14.4)	8.7 (−12.9)	15.8 (−9.0)	26.6 (−3.0)	37.1 (2.8)	51.0 (10.6)	58.2 (14.6)	56.7 (13.7)	43.3 (6.3)	27.5 (−2.5)	16.9 (−8.4)	7.8 (−13.4)	1.1 (−17.2)
Record low °F (°C)	−12 (−24)	−15 (−26)	−4 (−20)	12 (−11)	28 (−2)	42 (6)	46 (8)	47 (8)	29 (−2)	7 (−14)	3 (−16)	−18 (−28)	−18 (−28)
Average precipitation inches (mm)	0.80 (20)	0.74 (19)	1.74 (44)	2.08 (53)	3.12 (79)	3.45 (88)	2.74 (70)	2.54 (65)	2.12 (54)	2.15 (55)	0.94 (24)	0.82 (21)	23.24 (592)
Average snowfall inches (cm)	2.8 (7.1)	1.1 (2.8)	3.5 (8.9)	0.1 (0.25)	0.0 (0.0)	0.0 (0.0)	0.0 (0.0)	0.0 (0.0)	0.0 (0.0)	0.7 (1.8)	2.2 (5.6)	2.7 (6.9)	13.1 (33.35)
Average extreme snow depth inches (cm)	0.9 (2.3)	0.9 (2.3)	0.4 (1.0)	0.1 (0.25)	0.0 (0.0)	0.0 (0.0)	0.0 (0.0)	0.0 (0.0)	0.0 (0.0)	0.0 (0.0)	0.4 (1.0)	0.7 (1.8)	1.8 (4.6)
Average precipitation days (≥ 0.01 in)	2.5	3.3	4.7	5.1	6.7	6.5	6.5	6.5	4.2	4.4	3.2	3.4	57.0
Average snowy days (≥ 0.1 in)	0.9	0.7	0.8	0.0	0.0	0.0	0.0	0.0	0.0	0.2	0.5	0.9	4.0
Source 1: NOAA
Source 2: National Weather Service

== Demographics ==
Historical population
Census	Pop.	Note	%±
1930	658		—
1940	431		−34.5%
1950	540		25.3%
1960	466		−13.7%
1970	522		12.0%
1980	547		4.8%
1990	441		−19.4%
2000	412		−6.6%
2010	459		11.4%
2020	373		−18.7%
U.S. Decennial Census; 2020 Census

=== 2020 census ===
As of the 2020 census, Follett had a population of 373. The median age was 44.6 years. 23.3% of residents were under the age of 18 and 23.6% of residents were 65 years of age or older. For every 100 females there were 89.3 males, and for every 100 females age 18 and over there were 90.7 males age 18 and over.

0.0% of residents lived in urban areas, while 100.0% lived in rural areas.

There were 161 households in Follett, of which 28.0% had children under the age of 18 living in them. Of all households, 47.8% were married-couple households, 19.9% were households with a male householder and no spouse or partner present, and 29.2% were households with a female householder and no spouse or partner present. About 32.9% of all households were made up of individuals and 20.5% had someone living alone who was 65 years of age or older.

There were 222 housing units, of which 27.5% were vacant. The homeowner vacancy rate was 3.5% and the rental vacancy rate was 7.9%.

Racial composition as of the 2020 census
Race	Number	Percent
White	269	72.1%
Black or African American	0	0.0%
American Indian and Alaska Native	5	1.3%
Asian	1	0.3%
Native Hawaiian and Other Pacific Islander	0	0.0%
Some other race	48	12.9%
Two or more races	50	13.4%
Hispanic or Latino (of any race)	91	24.4%

=== 2000 census ===
As of the 2000 census, 412 people, 174 households, and 112 families resided in the town. The population density was 425.1 inhabitants per square mile (164.1/km^{2}). The 242 housing units had an average density of 249.7 per square mile (96.4/km^{2}). Its racial makeup was 91.75% White, 1.46% Native American, 6.07% from other races, and 0.73% from two or more races. Hispanic or Latino of any race were 7.28% of the population.

Of the 174 households, 28.2% had children under 18 living with them, 56.9% were married couples living together, 6.9% had a female householder with no husband present, and 35.1% were not families. About 33.3% of all households were made up of individuals, and 21.8% had someone living alone who was 65 or older. The average household size was 2.37 and the average family size was 3.04.

The town's age distribution was 26.5% under 18, 5.6% from 18 to 24, 21.8% from 25 to 44, 26.5% from 45 to 64, and 19.7% who were 65 or older. The median age was 42 years. For every 100 females, there were 89.9 males. For every 100 females 18 and over, there were 83.6 males.

The median income for a household in the town was $29,583 and for a family was $36,000. Males had a median income of $33,750 versus $15,781 for females. The per capita income for the town was $16,315. About 12.3% of families and 17.3% of the population were below the poverty line, including 21.0% of those under 18 and 24.4% of those 65 or over.

== Education ==
The Town of Follett is served by the Follett Independent School District.
