= List of United States tornadoes from November to December 2015 =

This is a list of all tornadoes that were confirmed by local offices of the National Weather Service in the United States from November to December 2015. Based on the 1991–2010 averaging period, 58 tornadoes occur across the United States throughout November while 24 more occur in December.

Both months were significantly above-average with 98 and 83 tornadoes respectively. Despite no tornadoes occurring in the latter part of the month, November produced two significant outbreaks during the middle of the month, the second of which was a very unusual late-season outbreak that impacted the lower Great Plains. Even though it was slightly less active, December featured back-to-back deadly and destructive outbreaks across the Southern and Midwestern United States in the latter half of the month.

== November ==
Confirmed tornadoes by Enhanced Fujita rating
EFU	EF0	EF1	EF2	EF3	EF4	EF5	Total
0	41	47	7	3	0	0	98

=== November 1 event ===
List of confirmed tornadoes – Sunday, November 1, 2015 (Note: All dates are based on the local time zone where the tornado touched down; however, all times are in Coordinated Universal Time for consistency.)
EF#	Location	County / Parish	State	Start Coord.	Time (UTC)	Path length	Max width	Damage (2015 USD)
EF0	NNW of Cairo	Grady	GA	30.9858°N 84.231°W	2045–2046	0.08 mi (0.13 km)	50 yd (46 m)	$10,000
EF0	A mobile home sustained minor roof damage and trees were damaged.							
EF0	W of Hartsfield	Colquitt	GA	31.2173°N 83.9785°W	2143–2144	0.03 mi (0.048 km)	25 yd (23 m)	$7,000
EF0	A home sustained damage to its metal roof and vinyl siding.							

=== November 2 event ===
List of confirmed tornadoes – Monday, November 2, 2015
EF#	Location	County / Parish	State	Start Coord.	Time (UTC)	Path length	Max width	Damage (2015 USD)
EF1	SE of Wausau	Washington	FL	30.5651°N 85.5547°W	1654–1702	6.2 mi (10.0 km)	50 yd (46 m)	$75,000
EF1	A portion of a metal roof to a barn was torn off. A garage door was ripped off, causing a hole in the roof of a house. A greenhouse was destroyed, and trees were downed or uprooted.							
EF0	NNE of Morgan	Calhoun	GA	31.5958°N 84.5834°W	1749–1754	2.5 mi (4.0 km)	50 yd (46 m)	$0
EF0	Trees were damaged.							
EF0	ENE of Jakin	Miller	GA	31.1223°N 84.8391°W	1811–1812	0.1 mi (0.16 km)	50 yd (46 m)	$50,000
EF0	A chicken coop was heavily damaged, vinyl siding was ripped off a house, a trampoline was displaced, and large tree limbs were downed.							
EF1	WNW of Jacksonville	Telfair	GA	31.8454°N 83.0922°W	2106–2122	1.63 mi (2.62 km)	50 yd (46 m)	$25,000
EF1	The roof was lifted off a structure and 15 to 20 trees were snapped.							
EF1	Lumber City	Telfair	GA	31.9366°N 82.8165°W	2132–2142	0.77 mi (1.24 km)	50 yd (46 m)	$25,000
EF1	Numerous trees were snapped or uprooted, and two large irrigation farming systems were damaged.							

=== November 5 event ===
List of confirmed tornadoes – Thursday, November 5, 2015
EF#	Location	County / Parish	State	Start Coord.	Time (UTC)	Path length	Max width	Damage (2015 USD)
EF0	N of Bearden to W of Okemah	Okfuskee	OK	35.4°N 96.3906°W	2022 – 2026	2.5 mi (4.0 km)	100 yd (91 m)	$2,000
EF0	Portions of a chain link fence were blown down, large tree limbs were snapped, and a softwood tree was uprooted.							
EF0	Northern Fort Worth	Tarrant	TX	32.79°N 97.33°W	2208 – 2014	3.87 mi (6.23 km)	40 yd (37 m)	$120,000
EF0	Several businesses were damaged, including a bank building that had roof damage and part of a car repair shop, where a loose truck bed was tossed about a quarter mile onto Loop 820.							
EF1	ESE of Haworth	McCurtain	OK	33.82°N 94.65°W	0318 – 0330	4.25 mi (6.84 km)	256 yd (234 m)	$10,000
EF1	One house sustained minor roof damage from a fallen tree, and trees were snapped and uprooted.							

=== November 6 event ===
List of confirmed tornadoes – Friday, November 6, 2015
EF#	Location	County / Parish	State	Start Coord.	Time (UTC)	Path length	Max width	Damage (2015 USD)
EF0	Bad Axe	Huron	MI	43.8°N 83.021°W	1146 – 1147	0.61 mi (0.98 km)	25 yd (23 m)	$15,000
EF0	Two billboards with I-beams were bent, a roof was partially blown off a structure, and extensive tree damage was observed.							
EF1	SE of Cash to W of Applegate	Sanilac	MI	43.336°N 82.763°W	1213 – 1217	3.64 mi (5.86 km)	150 yd (140 m)	$40,000
EF1	The roof and two walls of a manufactured single-wide home were destroyed, three barns were also destroyed, and extensive tree damage was observed.							
EF0	ENE of Yale	St. Clair	MI	43.148°N 82.696°W	1220 – 1221	0.8 mi (1.3 km)	75 yd (69 m)	$25,000
EF0	Three outbuildings or barns were destroyed while another had a portion of its roof peeled off. Five to ten trees were snapped or uprooted, and two power poles were snapped.							

=== November 11 event ===
List of confirmed tornadoes – Wednesday, November 11, 2015
EF#	Location	County / Parish	State	Start Coord.	Time (UTC)	Path length	Max width	Damage (2015 USD)
EF0	WNW of Yorktown	Page	IA	40.7475°N 95.2447°W	1848 – 1850	0.57 mi (0.92 km)	50 yd (46 m)	$0
EF0	A brief, small tornado touched down in open fields and was captured on video by storm chasers. No damage was reported.							
EF1	WSW of Avoca to N of Corley	Pottawattamie, Shelby	IA	41.4682°N 95.3943°W	1948 – 2002	10.21 mi (16.43 km)	150 yd (140 m)	$1,450,000
EF1	Six farmsteads were damaged, and the damage included outbuildings being damaged or destroyed, trees uprooted, and power poles downed. An empty grain bin was destroyed and a semi truck was lofted and tossed into a ditch on the side of Interstate 80 as well.							
EF1	SE of Clearfield to SSE of Creston Municipal Airport	Taylor, Ringgold, Union	IA	40.7157°N 94.5585°W	2000 – 2025	21.8 mi (35.1 km)	450 yd (410 m)	$405,000
EF1	Several farmsteads were damaged along the path, and the tornado clipped the edge of Clearfield early in its path. The beginning and end sections of the track were narrow and intermittent.							
EF1	SSW of Delphos to WSW of Tingley	Ringgold	IA	40.656°N 94.3396°W	2009 – 2020	12.18 mi (19.60 km)	280 yd (260 m)	$125,000
EF1	Six farmsteads were damaged along the path in central Ringgold County.							
EF0	N of Princeton	Mercer	MO	40.429°N 93.58°W	2025 – 2026	0.25 mi (0.40 km)	40 yd (37 m)	$0
EF0	Brief tornado with no damage.							
EF0	ESE of Manning to WSW of Templeton	Carroll	IA	41.8868°N 95.0122°W	2031 – 2033	1.49 mi (2.40 km)	40 yd (37 m)	$1,000
EF0	A narrow tornado tracked through cornfields and was reported by the public.							
EF1	SSE of Beaconsfield to NW of Grand River	Ringgold, Decatur	IA	40.7594°N 94.0373°W	2035 – 2048	11.17 mi (17.98 km)	200 yd (180 m)	$5,000
EF1	A cattle lean-to was destroyed, two outbuildings were damaged, and extensive tree damage occurred over a small area near Grand River.							
EF0	WNW of Barney to WNW of East Peru	Madison	IA	41.1792°N 94.0582°W	2049 – 2058	5.72 mi (9.21 km)	70 yd (64 m)	$3,000
EF0	A small outbuilding, crops, and trees were damaged.							
EF1	W of Winterset to SE of Earlham	Madison	IA	41.3113°N 94.1384°W	2051 – 2102	10.07 mi (16.21 km)	75 yd (69 m)	$25,000
EF1	At least one farmstead was damaged west of Winterset and the tornado was recorded on video by a storm chaser.							
EF0	Winterset	Madison	IA	41.2929°N 94.0557°W	2056 – 2100	2.97 mi (4.78 km)	160 yd (150 m)	$5,000
EF0	A small metal building and a scoreboard were destroyed at a high school athletic field.							
EF0	SE of Allerton	Wayne	IA	40.6438°N 93.3123°W	2057 – 2058	0.6 mi (0.97 km)	15 yd (14 m)	$0
EF0	Multiple storm chasers observed a brief, narrow tornado with no known damage.							
EF0	NW of Panora to WSW of Yale	Guthrie	IA	41.7262°N 94.4216°W	2057 – 2102	3.19 mi (5.13 km)	75 yd (69 m)	$5,000
EF0	A few residences on the north shore of Lake Panorama had minor damage and other property damage occurred further along the track as well. Many trees were downed as well.							
EF1	E of Redfield to S of Minburn	Dallas	IA	41.593°N 94.1424°W	2059 – 2113	11.28 mi (18.15 km)	100 yd (91 m)	$10,000
EF1	Damage occurred to outbuildings and trees.							
EF2	ESE of Confidence to NNE of Tyrone	Appanoose, Monroe	IA	40.8432°N 93.0872°W	2122 – 2138	13.03 mi (20.97 km)	190 yd (170 m)	$350,000
EF2	Strong tornado caused severe damage to farmsteads near Rathbun Lake. Homes were damaged, a few of which had their roofs torn off or were shifted off of their foundations. Garages and outbuildings were destroyed, trees and power poles were snapped, and a motor home was rolled.							
EF0	Des Moines International Airport	Polk	IA	41.518°N 93.6736°W	2127 – 2131	2.59 mi (4.17 km)	150 yd (140 m)	$25,000
EF0	Semi trailers were turned over at a National Guard base, the windows were blown out of a few buildings, and numerous large tree limbs were downed.							
EF1	Knoxville	Marion	IA	41.29°N 93.1315°W	2142 – 2147	4.38 mi (7.05 km)	100 yd (91 m)	$350,000
EF1	A high-end EF1 tornado moved through the southern and eastern sections of Knoxville. A Walmart store sustained significant roof damage and a nearby semi-truck was overturned. Multiple homes, garages, and trees sustained damage in residential areas of town, and one house had its roof blown off. One injury was reported.							
EF0	SSE of Ferguson	Marshall	IA	41.8984°N 92.8606°W	2215 – 2217	1.86 mi (2.99 km)	100 yd (91 m)	$1,000
EF0	Minor outbuilding and tree damage occurred at several farmsteads.							
EF1	E of Rose Hill to N of North English	Mahaska, Keokuk, Iowa	IA	41.3151°N 92.4225°W	2216 – 2241	24.81 mi (39.93 km)	130 yd (120 m)	Unknown
EF1	Intermittent tornado touched down and produced minor damage inside Mahaska County before moving into Keokuk County. In Keokuk County, multiple structures were damaged or destroyed, including small barns, cattle sheds and outbuildings, and power poles and large trees were also snapped. The tornado tracked just northwest of What Cheer before continuing on an intermittent track into Iowa County, where more small barns and outbuildings were destroyed before the tornado dissipated.							
EF2	Barnes City	Mahaska, Poweshiek	IA	41.4245°N 92.4992°W	2220 – 2229	6.6 mi (10.6 km)	150 yd (140 m)	$76,000
EF2	A well-built outbuilding was completely destroyed at EF2 strength at the beginning of the path. The tornado weakened and moved due-north, striking Barnes City at EF1 strength, where trees had branches and trunks snapped and outbuildings were damaged. Some of the outbuildings in town were removed from their foundations, and the back end of a car was shifted two feet.							
EF1	W of Arbela	Scotland	MO	40.4557°N 92.0875°W	2240 – 2243	2.52 mi (4.06 km)	75 yd (69 m)	Unknown
EF1	A grain bin and an old barn were destroyed, hay bales were tossed, power poles were snapped, and trees were damaged.							
EF1	Le Claire	Scott	IA	41.6°N 90.343°W	0036 – 0041	2.37 mi (3.81 km)	100 yd (91 m)	Unknown
EF1	A tornado developed on the Mississippi River and tracked into Le Claire. Damage occurred mostly to trees, but several homes had roof and siding damage, and one home's roof was lifted up and flipped onto a neighboring home.							
EF0	NE of Cleveland	Rock Island	IL	41.5337°N 90.2518°W	0037 – 0038	0.1 mi (0.16 km)	100 yd (91 m)	Unknown
EF0	Four houses had minor damage and several outbuildings were also damaged, including one outbuilding that was completely destroyed. A corn crib was moved 40 yd (37 m) and destroyed. A barn had its roof ripped off, and a privacy fence and trees were downed.							
EF1	N of Geneseo to SE of Hillsdale	Henry	IL	41.5025°N 90.167°W	0039 – 0045	4.23 mi (6.81 km)	50 yd (46 m)	Unknown
EF1	A large machine shed was destroyed, a home was partially unroofed when its porch was torn off, and trees were damaged.							

=== November 15 event ===
List of confirmed tornadoes – Sunday, November 15, 2015
EF#	Location	County / Parish	State	Start Coord.	Time (UTC)	Path length	Max width	Damage (2015 USD)
EF1	Northern Denair	Stanislaus	CA	37.5306°N 120.8118°W	2154–2215	3.04 mi (4.89 km)	150 yd (140 m)	$1,200,000
EF1	Approximately 21 homes were impacted; most sustained only minor roof damage, but two sustained major damage. Numerous trees, fences, and power lines were downed.							

=== November 16 event ===
List of confirmed tornadoes – Monday, November 16, 2015
EF#	Location	County / Parish	State	Start Coord.	Time (UTC)	Path length	Max width	Damage (2015 USD)
EF0	S of Ulysses	Grant	KS		2154–2155	0.13 mi (0.21 km)	25 yd (23 m)	$0
EF0	A storm chaser reported a brief tornado that caused no damage.							
EF0	ENE of Garden City to WSW of Eminence	Finney	KS		2314–2320	4.6 mi (7.4 km)	50 yd (46 m)	$0
EF0	A storm chaser reported a tornado that caused no damage.							
EF0	SE of Grinnell	Gove	KS		2320–2324	2.72 mi (4.38 km)	25 yd (23 m)	$0
EF0	A trained storm spotter reported a tornado that caused no damage.							
EF0	WSW of Grainfield	Gove	KS		2330–2332	1.83 mi (2.95 km)	25 yd (23 m)	$0
EF0	Law enforcement reported a tornado that caused no damage.							
EF1	Grainfield to E of Hoxie	Gove, Sheridan	KS		2334–0003	18.47 mi (29.72 km)	300 yd (270 m)	Unknown
EF1	Tornado struck the town of Grainfield, where numerous trees, power lines, and grain bins were damaged. A wood structure sustained damage, an abandoned house had its roof ripped off, and a quonset building was destroyed. A small shop, windows, and sheds were destroyed, and a second home sustained minor damage.							
EF3	NE of Liberal to NE of Montezuma	Seward, Meade， Gray	KS		2338–0056	51.26 mi (82.49 km)	2,000 yd (1,800 m)	Unknown
EF3	See section on this tornado							
EF0	WSW of Goodnight	Armstrong	TX		2344−2345	0.4 mi (0.64 km)	50 yd (46 m)	$0
EF0	Storm chasers observed a brief tornado that caused no damage.							
EF0	NNE of Skellytown	Roberts	TX		2344−2345	0.11 mi (0.18 km)	50 yd (46 m)	$0
EF0	A storm chaser observed a brief tornado that caused no visible damage.							
EF2	S of Alamota to W of Ness City	Lane, Ness	KS		2356–0020	16.52 mi (26.59 km)	1,500 yd (1,400 m)	Unknown
EF2	A large wedge tornado caused substantial damage to a farm, trees, power lines, and fences.							
EF1	SE of Spearman	Roberts	TX		0005–0015	0.26 mi (0.42 km)	50 yd (46 m)	$0
EF1	A brief tornado occurred in a very rural area of northwestern Roberts County, causing a windmill to collapse. A witness stated that a funnel was visible for about 10 minutes and the tornado tracked 4 to 5 miles (6.4 to 8.0 km).							
EF0	WNW of Groom	Carson	TX		0009–0010	0.22 mi (0.35 km)	50 yd (46 m)	$0
EF0	Storm chasers reported a brief tornado touchdown just west of Groom, causing no visible damage.							
EF1	NE of Plains to N of Missler	Meade	KS		0019–0030	6.33 mi (10.19 km)	100 yd (91 m)	Unknown
EF1	This was a satellite tornado to the long-track EF3 tornado above. A house, some outbuildings, and irrigation pivot sprinklers were damaged.							
EF3	NNE of Groom to WNW of Miami	Gray, Roberts	TX		0020–0120	31.86 mi (51.27 km)	750 yd (690 m)	Unknown
EF3	See section on this tornado							
EF1	NNW of Ness City	Ness	KS		0027–0039	3.93 mi (6.32 km)	200 yd (180 m)	Unknown
EF1	Trees, vehicles, power lines, and buildings sustained damage. A historic 115-year-old stone and frame barn was destroyed.							
EF1	Lenora	Norton	KS		0036–0048	6 mi (9.7 km)	100 yd (91 m)	Unknown
EF1	Tornado moved directly through Lenora, where windows and garage doors were damaged or blown out. An aluminum door was folded and mangled, outbuildings sustained minor damage, and trees were blown through windows. A Nex-Tech building had its roof ripped off.							
EF2	NW of Groom to SE of White Deer	Carson, Gray	TX		0042–0055	10.42 mi (16.77 km)	175 yd (160 m)	Unknown
EF2	Strong tornado completely destroyed a well-built metal frame outbuilding. A home had its windows broken and roof decking material removed, with the roof uplifted. Large pieces of wood were embedded in the roof. A large truck was moved 50 yards (46 m).							
EF0	SSE of Perryton	Ochiltree	TX		0044–0050	3.66 mi (5.89 km)	100 yd (91 m)	Unknown
EF0	An emergency manager reported a brief tornado. Little to no damage was observed.							
EF2	E of Seminole	Gaines	TX		0046–0056	5.57 mi (8.96 km)	100 yd (91 m)	Unknown
EF2	Power poles, irrigation pivot equipment, and a cotton field were damaged. EF2 damage was inflicted to a well service rig.							
EF1	ESE of Perryton to SW of Booker	Ochiltree	TX		0052–0059	5.78 mi (9.30 km)	200 yd (180 m)	Unknown
EF1	Trees, a barbed wire fence, and the roof to a barn sustained damage from this tornado. Three power poles were broken as well.							
EF2	S of Ensign to E of Cimarron	Gray, Ford	KS		0055–0119	14.94 mi (24.04 km)	500 yd (460 m)	Unknown
EF2	A well-built metal frame outbuilding was heavily damaged, with its metal supports severely twisted and bent as a result of this large wedge tornado. Numerous power poles were snapped, large trees were uprooted, irrigation pivots were flipped, and three homes sustained roof and window damage.							
EF1	WSW of Booker, TX to S of Elmwood, OK	Ochiltree (TX), Beaver (OK)	TX, OK		0100–0108	5.18 mi (8.34 km)	400 yd (370 m)	Unknown
EF1	Fence and tree damage was observed near the Texas–Oklahoma state line, and multiple power flashes were observed just west of the town of Booker.							
EF0	S of Ogallah	Trego	KS		0106–0109	1.66 mi (2.67 km)	100 yd (91 m)	$0
EF0	Trees were uprooted, and tree limbs were snapped.							
EF3	E of Pampa	Gray	TX		0106–0119	10.92 mi (17.57 km)	500 yd (460 m)	Unknown
EF3	See section on this tornado							
EF1	NE of Norton	Norton	KS		0110–0116	3.85 mi (6.20 km)	400 yd (370 m)	$83,000
EF1	Twelve electrical poles were downed, a flagpole was bent in half, a trailer house and outbuildings were damaged, and a radio station lost its ability to broadcast.							
EF0	S of Beaver	Beaver	OK		0110–0118	4.22 mi (6.79 km)	100 yd (91 m)	$0
EF0	Storm chasers observed this tornado that caused no known damage.							
EF1	NE of Pampa to NNW of Miami	Gray, Roberts	TX		0122–0144	16 mi (26 km)	300 yd (270 m)	Unknown
EF1	This tornado paralleled and crossed the path of the first Pampa EF3 tornado and was produced by the same supercell that produced the second Pampa EF3 tornado. Damage was confined to wooden power poles broken in Roberts County.							
EF1	NW of Almena to E of Hollinger	Norton, Furnas	KS, NE		0124–0157	18.45 mi (29.69 km)	400 yd (370 m)	$50,000
EF1	Trees, power poles, signs, outbuildings, fences, windmills, and small farm machinery were damaged. The western side roof covering was ripped from a barn, and several grain carts on the property were moved.							
EF0	NE of Borger	Hutchinson	TX		0143–0144	0.56 mi (0.90 km)	50 yd (46 m)	$0
EF0	A storm chaser observed a brief tornado that touched down over open country, causing no damage.							
EF0	N of Miami to SW of Canadian	Roberts, Hemphill	TX		0145–0155	7.21 mi (11.60 km)	50 yd (46 m)	$0
EF0	This tornado remained over open country, causing no damage.							
EF0	WNW of Panhandle	Potter	TX		0158–0159	0.38 mi (0.61 km)	50 yd (46 m)	$0
EF0	This brief tornado was reported in an open field in rural eastern Potter County, causing no damage.							
EF0	W of WaKeeney	Trego	KS		0219–0220	0.8 mi (1.3 km)	100 yd (91 m)	Unknown
EF0	A machine shed was destroyed, and bales of feed were moved.							
EF1	NW of Glazier, TX to SSW of May, OK	Hemphill (TX), Lipscomb (TX), Ellis (OK)	TX, OK		0220–0313	43.03 mi (69.25 km)	200 yd (180 m)	Unknown
EF1	One home sustained roof damage, sheet metal debris from an outbuilding was scattered across a field, and some small power poles were snapped. Oil field equipment and fences were damaged, and multiple trees and tree limbs were snapped along the path as well. Trees and power lines were damaged after the tornado crossed into Oklahoma.							
EF1	SSE of Farnsworth to SSE of Perryton	Ochiltree	TX		0226–0251	14.59 mi (23.48 km)	70 yd (64 m)	Unknown
EF1	Power poles, fences, and a few oil equipment sheds were damaged along the path.							
EF0	SSE of Booker	Lipscomb	TX		0259–0307	4.69 mi (7.55 km)	100 yd (91 m)	$0
EF0	This brief tornado was observed in a rural area. Little or no damage occurred due to a lack of structures.							
EF2	SSE of May to NE of Selman	Ellis, Harper	OK		0318–0351	27.2 mi (43.8 km)	400 yd (370 m)	$7,000
EF2	A home was damaged, sheds were destroyed, outbuildings were heavily damaged, power poles were broken, and trees were damaged along the path.							
EF1	NNE of Darrouzett, TX to N of Logan	Beaver	OK		0324–0337	8.93 mi (14.37 km)	500 yd (460 m)	Unknown
EF1	Several barns and outbuildings were destroyed, and additional homes sustained minimal damage. Numerous power poles and trees were snapped.							
EF1	NW of Freedom, OK to SE of Coldwater, KS	Woods (OK), Comanche (KS)	OK, KS		0409–0438	19.33 mi (31.11 km)	810 yd (740 m)	Unknown
EF1	An old home sustained major damage, and buildings at an oil field were destroyed. Trees were snapped, significant tree damage occurred, and farm implements and outbuildings were damaged or destroyed as well.							
EF1	E of Coldwater	Comanche	KS		0438–0447	5.31 mi (8.55 km)	460 yd (420 m)	Unknown
EF1	A 0.25 mi (0.40 km) stretch of power poles were downed. Large branches were broken off trees.							

=== November 17 event ===
List of confirmed tornadoes – Tuesday, November 17, 2015
EF#	Location	County / Parish	State	Start Coord.	Time (UTC)	Path length	Max width	Damage (2015 USD)
EF0	SE of Keller	Tarrant	TX		0928–0929	0.9 mi (1.4 km)	30 yd (27 m)	$210,000
EF0	Approximately 10 homes sustained minor roof damage, and several trees were downed.							
EF1	SSE of Corinth to NNE of Lake Dallas	Denton	TX		0944–0948	3.07 mi (4.94 km)	50 yd (46 m)	$500,000
EF1	Several homes sustained minor roof damage, a few homes had their garage doors destroyed, a car wash suffered severe damage, several business signs were damaged or destroyed, and a hotel sustained significant roof damage.							
EF1	E of College Station	Grimes	TX		1053–1104	9.25 mi (14.89 km)	50 yd (46 m)	$200,000
EF1	Numerous large trees were snapped or uprooted. Two trailers were thrown and destroyed, numerous barns, outbuildings, and mobile homes suffered severe damage, and tin and lumber debris were tossed over 0.5 mi (0.80 km).							
EF1	E of Checotah	McIntosh	OK		1143–1148	4.7 mi (7.6 km)	300 yd (270 m)	$150,000
EF1	A number of outbuildings and a chicken house were destroyed, the roofs of several homes were damaged, trees were snapped or uprooted, and power lines were downed.							
EF1	SE of Edwards	Hinds	MS		0333–0335	1.9 mi (3.1 km)	50 yd (46 m)	$10,000
EF1	Several trees were snapped or uprooted.							

=== November 18 event ===
List of confirmed tornadoes – Wednesday, November 18, 2015
EF#	Location	County / Parish	State	Start Coord.	Time (UTC)	Path length	Max width	Damage (2015 USD)
EF1	NNE of Pelahatchie to NNE of Forkville	Rankin, Scott	MS		0540–0550	8.73 mi (14.05 km)	440 yd (400 m)	$83,000
EF1	Numerous trees were downed or uprooted. A mobile home was rolled and destroyed. Some tin was removed from the roof of a home, and a shed sustained some damage. An old, unused chicken house was heavily damaged.							
EF1	NNW of Forkville	Scott	MS		0547–0551	2.98 mi (4.80 km)	250 yd (230 m)	$12,000
EF1	Multiple trees were snapped or uprooted.							
EF1	S of Lena	Scott	MS		0555–0559	3.54 mi (5.70 km)	200 yd (180 m)	$10,000
EF1	Multiple trees were snapped or uprooted, and a couple trees and limbs were downed.							
EF1	SE of Carthage	Leake	MS		0605–0614	7.27 mi (11.70 km)	400 yd (370 m)	$50,000
EF1	A chicken house had parts of its roof taken off, and several power lines and numerous trees were downed.							
EF0	E of Lena	Leake	MS		0605–0606	0.46 mi (0.74 km)	75 yd (69 m)	$5,000
EF0	A brief, weak tornado damaged a few trees.							
EF1	E of Carthage to NW of Edinburg	Leake	MS		0614–0624	8.11 mi (13.05 km)	500 yd (460 m)	$40,000
EF1	An outbuilding was destroyed, power lines were downed, and numerous trees were snapped and uprooted.							
EF1	NE of Midway to SE of Zama	Leake, Neshoba	MS		0621–0631	7.35 mi (11.83 km)	250 yd (230 m)	$13,000
EF1	Dozens of pine trees were damaged along the path.							
EF1	ESE of Zama	Leake, Neshoba, Winston	MS		0630–0634	3.02 mi (4.86 km)	300 yd (270 m)	$13,000
EF1	Part of a roof was torn off of a house, with roofing debris thrown into the highway, and trees were snapped and uprooted.							
EF1	NE of Zama	Winston	MS		0641–0643	2.21 mi (3.56 km)	300 yd (270 m)	$8,000
EF1	Numerous trees were snapped and uprooted.							
EF1	SW of Highpoint	Winston	MS		0645–0649	1.69 mi (2.72 km)	150 yd (140 m)	$20,000
EF1	Numerous trees were snapped and uprooted, one of which landed on a home.							
EF0	E of Algoma to SSW of Endville	Pontotoc	MS		0706–0718	9.16 mi (14.74 km)	250 yd (230 m)	$100,000
EF0	A storage building and outbuildings were damaged, and trees were damaged along the path, one of which fell on a house.							
EF0	NW of Wells to E of Kolola Springs	Lowndes	MS		0953–0956	2.2 mi (3.5 km)	50 yd (46 m)	$8,000
EF0	A brief tornado uprooted a few trees and broke off several large limbs.							
EF0	SSW of Mossy Head	Walton	FL		1735–1736	0.01 mi (0.016 km)	25 yd (23 m)	$0
EF0	A brief tornado touched down on Eglin Air Force Base property and displaced magnolia tree branches roughly 200 yards (180 m).							
EF0	NE of Mossy Head	Walton	FL		1805–1807	0.07 mi (0.11 km)	50 yd (46 m)	$0
EF0	The public reported a brief tornado touchdown north of Eglin Air Force Base property, causing no damage.							
EF1	WSW of Palmetto	Coweta	GA		2148–2149	0.19 mi (0.31 km)	200 yd (180 m)	$50,000
EF1	Tornado moved through a subdivision, snapping small trees and damaging five homes. One of the homes had its front porch and a section of its roof lifted off, with the debris being thrown nearly 50 yards (46 m) away. Fences were blown down and 4 by 4 beams were snapped near their bases as well.							
EF1	Northern Fairburn	Fulton	GA		2159–2203	2.64 mi (4.25 km)	200 yd (180 m)	$150,000
EF1	Near the beginning of the path, goal posts and bleachers sustained minor damage at Creekside High School. The tornado moved through residential areas of Fairburn, snapping and uprooting numerous large trees and causing minor structural damage to several homes. Some of the trees landed on homes and caused significant damage. A small, unsecured shed was torn apart as well. One minor injury occurred when a tree fell on a car near a country club.							
EF0	SE of Tucker	DeKalb	GA		2247–2248	0.12 mi (0.19 km)	100 yd (91 m)	$60,000
EF0	Two locations sustained structural damage from a brief tornado. The north-facing front wall was ripped apart at one location in the area, and the roof and metal siding of another location were partially peeled back. Additionally, two pine trees were uprooted.							
EF0	N of Gretna	Gadsden	FL		2305–2313	2.67 mi (4.30 km)	50 yd (46 m)	$0
EF0	A tornado tracked across a rural area and blew down a tree.							

== December ==
Confirmed tornadoes by Enhanced Fujita rating
EFU	EF0	EF1	EF2	EF3	EF4	EF5	Total
0	25	41	12	3	2	0	83

=== December 10 event ===
List of confirmed tornadoes – Thursday, December 10, 2015
EF#	Location	County / Parish	State	Start Coord.	Time (UTC)	Path length	Max width	Damage (2015 USD)
EF1	SW of Battle Ground	Clark	WA	45.77°N 122.5366°W	1915–1921	0.82 mi (1.32 km)	528 yd (483 m)	$311,000
EF1	A tornado damaged 36 homes and 2 businesses, uplifting several roofs. Dozens of trees were blown down and about half a dozen more were snapped.							

=== December 12 event ===
List of confirmed tornadoes – Saturday, December 12, 2015
EF#	Location	County / Parish	State	Start Coord.	Time (UTC)	Path length	Max width	Damage (2015 USD)
EF2	Eastern Lindale	Smith	TX	32.4984°N 95.3989°W	2125–2128	1.79 mi (2.88 km)	150 yd (140 m)	Unknown
EF2	About 50 homes sustained damage, either from the tornado itself or falling trees, and two homes had major damage. Numerous trees were snapped or uprooted along the path as well.							
EF2	NNW of Willis to S of New Waverly	Montgomery	TX	30.4561°N 95.4994°W	2154–2200	2.24 mi (3.60 km)	100 yd (91 m)	Unknown
EF2	Large industrial buildings were heavily damaged, multiple RVs were flipped and destroyed at a RV park, and tree damage occurred along the path.							
EF2	E of Pickton to SSE of Saltillo	Franklin	TX	33.0371°N 95.3032°W	2218–2228	5.32 mi (8.56 km)	775 yd (709 m)	$2,000,000
EF2	Around twenty structures were damaged, including four mobile homes that were completely destroyed, and four homes sustained major damage. Numerous trees were snapped and uprooted along the path as well. Two people were injured in one of the mobile homes.							
EF1	SSW of Bogata	Red River	TX	33.3912°N 95.2567°W	2259–2300	1.02 mi (1.64 km)	187 yd (171 m)	$35,000
EF1	The roof of a two-story home was removed and trees were snapped or uprooted.							
EF0	ENE of Deport	Red River	TX	33.5492°N 95.2342°W	2314–2315	0.1 mi (0.16 km)	50 yd (46 m)	$10,000
EF0	A brief tornado snapped the trunks of some trees and completely destroyed an outbuilding.							
EF0	ESE of Lefors	Gray	TX	35.37°N 100.66°W	2353–2354	0.04 mi (0.064 km)	50 yd (46 m)	$0
EF0	A storm chaser observed a brief tornado touchdown that caused no damage.							
EF1	E of Fort Towson	Choctaw	OK	33.9867°N 95.2579°W	0003–0006	3.3 mi (5.3 km)	250 yd (230 m)	$0
EF1	Many trees were snapped or uprooted as the tornado moved through Raymond Gary State Park.							
EF2	W of Valliant to NNE of Slim	McCurtain	OK	34.0074°N 95.1384°W	0117–0137	7.32 mi (11.78 km)	600 yd (550 m)	$2,000,000
EF2	Sixteen homes suffered significant damage, and four mobile homes were completely destroyed. Numerous trees were snapped and/or uprooted along the path as well. Three injuries occurred; two in one of the destroyed mobile homes and one in a mobile home that was rolled by the tornado.							

=== December 21 event ===
List of confirmed tornadoes – Monday, December 21, 2015
EF#	Location	County / Parish	State	Start Coord.	Time (UTC)	Path length	Max width	Damage (2015 USD)
EF1	SE of Afeman to S of Elmer	Rapides	LA	31.0425°N 92.7343°W	2323–2332	4.5 mi (7.2 km)	30 yd (27 m)	$10,000
EF1	A travel trailer was flipped, and the roof of a home and a barn were damaged. Trees were uprooted along the path as well. The person who was inside the travel trailer was injured and transported to a hospital.							
EF1	NE of Woodworth to SSW of Kolin	Rapides	LA	31.1906°N 92.4282°W	0038–0046	4.26 mi (6.86 km)	30 yd (27 m)	$10,000
EF1	A downed tree fell into a garage, destroying it, and several mobile homes received minor damage. A tree also fell on a car, and additional trees were uprooted. The tornado was observed and photographed by several people.							

=== December 23 event ===
List of confirmed tornadoes – Wednesday, December 23, 2015
EF#	Location	County / Parish	State	Start Coord.	Time (UTC)	Path length	Max width	Damage (2015 USD)
EF0	SSW of Moncks Corner	Berkeley	SC		0827–0828	0.2 mi (0.32 km)	100 yd (91 m)	$18,000
EF0	A brief tornado tossed roofing material, impaled a piece of wood into the side of a building, and destroyed a 200 square foot (19 m^{2}) shed; the shed's roof was tossed 300 ft (91 m). A telephone pole was blown over, multiple 150 pounds (68 kg) carts were tossed away from the site of the shed, and a convergent damage signature was visible in vegetation farther along the path as well.							
EF1	ESE of Bee Branch	Van Buren	AR		1420–1421	0.18 mi (0.29 km)	75 yd (69 m)	$80,000
EF1	A brief, weak tornado destroyed a home east of Bee Branch.							
EF1	ESE of Van Buren	Carter	MO		1543–1551	6 mi (9.7 km)	100 yd (91 m)	$90,000
EF1	An old abandoned school house was nearly destroyed in the small community of Chilton, and a few homes received siding and shingle damage. The metal roofing of an old saw mill was damaged, and hundreds of trees were snapped or uprooted as well.							
EF1	W of Mill Spring	Wayne	MO		1556–1559	2.95 mi (4.75 km)	50 yd (46 m)	$5,000
EF1	Several trees were snapped or uprooted and large tree branches were broken.							
EF1	NE of Patterson	Wayne	MO		1608–1612	3.04 mi (4.89 km)	75 yd (69 m)	$50,000
EF1	A couple dozen tree trunks were snapped and large tree branches were broken or snapped.							
EF0	E of Ava	Jackson	IL		1715–1721	6 mi (9.7 km)	50 yd (46 m)	$5,000
EF0	Many trees were snapped or uprooted.							
EF1	E of Pinckneyville to Southern Tamaroa	Perry	IL		1723–1729	5.03 mi (8.10 km)	200 yd (180 m)	$175,000
EF1	Numerous trees were snapped or uprooted, several barns sustained severe structural damage, and several homes experienced varying degrees of roof damage.							
EF1	WSW of Albion	Wayne, Edwards	IL		1830–1836	4.28 mi (6.89 km)	100 yd (91 m)	$13,000
EF1	A few trees were uprooted, while several were snapped. A home sustained partial shingle loss, and a barn also had its roof damaged.							
EF1	NW of Carmi	White	IL		1832–1835	1.58 mi (2.54 km)	100 yd (91 m)	$75,000
EF1	Trees were uprooted or snapped near Burrell Woods Campground.							
EF1	Greenwood	Johnson	IN		2042–2043	0.3 mi (0.48 km)	40 yd (37 m)	$250,000
EF1	Three homes sustained structural damage and several trees were uprooted.							
EF3	NE of Shelby to E of Como	Bolivar, Coahoma, Quitman, Panola	MS		2054–2157	61.57 mi (99.09 km)	800 yd (730 m)	$2,354,000
EF3	2 deaths – Power poles were bent at EF0 strength near Shelby before the tornado reached EF3 strength near Clarksdale, where trees were debarked and small frame homes and mobile homes were completely destroyed. Airplanes and metal buildings were destroyed at a small airport in this area as well. EF1 tree damage occurred near Marks and Sledge before the tornado regained high-end EF3 strength between Como and Sardis, where a brick home was completely leveled, and another had its exterior walls collapse before the tornado dissipated east of Como as the Holly Springs EF4 tornado developed just to the east. A total of 28 people were injured.							
EF1	Noblesville	Hamilton	IN		2055–2057	0.7 mi (1.1 km)	140 yd (130 m)	$50,000
EF1	A mobile home was flipped over and destroyed, and a trampoline was blown onto a mailbox.							
EF2	S of Marianna	Lee	AR		2057–2102	4.65 mi (7.48 km)	100 yd (91 m)	$100,000
EF2	The tornado flattened grain bins, removed the roof from a brick house, destroyed a mobile home, and damaged cabins.							
EF1	WNW of Williamstown	Decatur, Rush	IN		2113–2115	0.78 mi (1.26 km)	50 yd (46 m)	$25,000
EF1	One barn was destroyed, another barn had roof panels torn off, and tree limbs were snapped.							
EF0	S of Pueblo	Spencer	IN		2139–2142	2.05 mi (3.30 km)	50 yd (46 m)	$3,000
EF0	Tree limbs were broken and small trees were snapped.							
EF0	E of Fountain City to Bethel	Wayne	IN		2157–2205	3.25 mi (5.23 km)	30 yd (27 m)	$150,000
EF0	Multiple outbuildings were destroyed and barns were damaged. The tornado struck the town of Bethel before dissipating, where a church sustained roof damage and had its chimney collapsed.							
EF4	NNE of Sardis, MS to NE of Selmer, TN	Tate (MS), Marshall (MS), Benton (MS), Tippah (MS), Hardeman (TN), McNairy (TN)	MS, TN		2210–2325	75.09 mi (120.85 km)	1,300 yd (1,200 m)	$10,922,000
EF4	9 deaths – See article on this tornado – 36 people were injured.							
EF0	E of Arcanum	Darke	OH		2212–2215	0.03 mi (0.048 km)	20 yd (18 m)	$6,000
EF0	A brief tornado lifted the roof off a large metal building.							
EF1	SW of Sciota to S of Roseville	McDonough, Warren	IL		2215–2230	10.7 mi (17.2 km)	50 yd (46 m)	$0
EF1	Outbuildings were destroyed, and a few trees were snapped.							
EF0	WSW of Reynolds to E of Andalusia	Mercer, Rock Island	IL		2233–2246	10.62 mi (17.09 km)	50 yd (46 m)	$0
EF0	Several trees and tree branches were snapped off.							
EF1	Hiawatha	Linn	IA		2234–2238	2.25 mi (3.62 km)	50 yd (46 m)	$0
EF1	Approximately twelve homes sustained roof and siding damage, and trees were snapped or uprooted.							
EF1	SW of Jackson	Madison	TN		2243–2244	1.21 mi (1.95 km)	50 yd (46 m)	$25,000
EF1	Several storage buildings and barns were damaged, and a home sustained roof damage.							
EF1	Canton	Wayne	MI		2343–2346	1.96 mi (3.15 km)	100 yd (91 m)	$500,000
EF1	A tornado downed trees and tree limbs in residential areas, caused considerable damage to metal buildings and vehicles at an industrial park, and tore the metal roof off of a gas station. It is the only known tornado to have occurred in Michigan during the month of December.							
EF1	NW of Luxemburg	Dubuque	IA		2338–2340	1.1 mi (1.8 km)	25 yd (23 m)	$0
EF1	Trees and outbuildings were damaged on two farms.							
EF1	W of Booneville	Prentiss	MS		0016–0020	3.93 mi (6.32 km)	80 yd (73 m)	$100,000
EF1	Several mobile homes were damaged or destroyed, trees were uprooted, and a house slid off of its foundation.							
EF2	SSE of Linden to SW of Centerville	Perry, Hickman	TN		0017–0032	14.92 mi (24.01 km)	500 yd (460 m)	$2,000,000
EF2	2 deaths – Numerous sheds, barns, and outbuildings were destroyed, along with a small, unanchored home along U.S. Highway 412 (where the two fatalities occurred). A brick home sustained major damage in Perry County, and several other homes were damaged in Hickman County. Hundreds of trees were downed along the path.							
EF3	SW of Lutts to SW of Mount Pleasant	Wayne, Lawrence, Lewis, Maury	TN		0055–0152	48.38 mi (77.86 km)	800 yd (730 m)	$5,210,000
EF3	See Section on this tornado – 7 people were injured.							
EF2	N of Waterloo, AL to NNW of Cypress Inn, TN	Lauderdale (AL), Wayne (TN)	AL, TN		0100–0117	14.87 mi (23.93 km)	400 yd (370 m)	>$100,000
EF2	In Lauderdale County, large sections of roofing was removed from two houses and a church, another home sustained minor damage, a mobile home was pushed off its foundation, and many trees were downed. Moving into Wayne County, the tornado destroyed one home and downed dozens more trees before lifting. One person was injured in a house in Lauderdale County.							
EF1	S of Butler	Pendleton	KY		0111–0116	3.75 mi (6.04 km)	440 yd (400 m)	$120,000
EF1	An anchored mobile home was rolled over, a 15-square-foot (1.4 m^{2}) dock was broken loose and pulled across a pond, a barn was destroyed, and three more barns were damaged, with one's roof being ripped off and thrown into adjacent trees. A camper was lifted 10 to 15 feet (3.0 to 4.6 m) above a stand of trees before being dropped and destroyed, heavy sections of horse corral fencing were carried approximately 50 yards (46 m), a house lost part of its roof, and two more homes sustained structural damage consisting of roof damage and blown in garage doors. Many trees were downed along the path, and three people were injured.							
EF2	ESE of Alexandria to E of Lancaster	DeKalb, Smith	TN		0414–0425	8.92 mi (14.36 km)	250 yd (230 m)	$400,000
EF2	Three homes and a log cabin home sustained minor roof damage, two barns were heavily damaged, and a cinder-block garage and a small shed were destroyed. Another home lost its roof, two exterior walls on the second level, two covered porches, and an adjacent carport. Many trees were downed along the path, which crossed the Smith Fork Creek seven times between Temperance Hall and Lancaster. This was the first December tornado recorded in both counties.							
EF0	Parkersburg	Wood	WV		0425–0426	0.18 mi (0.29 km)	25 yd (23 m)	$100,000
EF0	A brief tornado touched down in Parkersburg, causing roof damage to several buildings. An old church had its roof completely removed.							

=== December 24 event ===
List of confirmed tornadoes – Thursday, December 24, 2015
EF#	Location	County / Parish	State	Start Coord.	Time (UTC)	Path length	Max width	Damage (2015 USD)
EF0	E of Comer	Barbour	AL	32.027°N 85.339°W	0941–0948	3.6 mi (5.8 km)	100 yd (91 m)	$0
EF0	Several trees were downed along U.S. Highway 82.							
EF0	WNW of Clayton	Barbour	AL	31.8829°N 85.5918°W	1034–1040	3.16 mi (5.09 km)	125 yd (114 m)	$0
EF0	Two sheds were damaged, and numerous trees were downed.							
EF0	SW of Culloden	Upson	GA	32.8212°N 84.1342°W	1829–1830	0.2 mi (0.32 km)	80 yd (73 m)	$15,000
EF0	Several trees were snapped or uprooted, and a small shed was destroyed.							
EF1	Folsom Lake to Cameron Park	El Dorado	CA	38.705°N 121.1157°W	2300–2330	6.21 mi (9.99 km)	100 yd (91 m)	$1,000,000
EF1	A tornado touched down at Folsom Lake and moved through El Dorado Hills, damaging the roofs of homes and businesses, and downing trees and fences. Additional tree, roof and fence damage occurred in Cameron Park before the tornado dissipated.							
EF0	N of Ceres	Stanislaus	CA	37.619°N 120.9569°W	2315–2320	0.23 mi (0.37 km)	30 yd (27 m)	$20,000
EF0	A brief tornado collapsed a carport, damaging the adjacent home. Trees and fences also sustained damage.							

=== December 25 event ===
List of confirmed tornadoes – Friday, December 25, 2015
EF#	Location	County / Parish	State	Start Coord.	Time (UTC)	Path length	Max width	Damage (2015 USD)
EF1	Shelbyville	Bedford	TN		1318–1319	0.48 mi (0.77 km)	75 yd (69 m)	$50,000
EF1	Two large sections of roofing were torn off a Rubbermaid factory, with roofing gravel being blown in all directions and several company vehicles being damaged. Six empty tractor-trailers were blown around and partially stacked, and several garage doors failed, with at least three being blown back into the building. A Calsonic building was also impacted, with two windows blown out, a glass door blown in, and a carport being damaged. Elsewhere, a large tree was blown down, tree branches were broken off, and a few metal signs were smashed to the ground.							
EF0	SE of Coaling	Tuscaloosa	AL		2129–2142	4.98 mi (8.01 km)	185 yd (169 m)	$0
EF0	Approximately one dozen trees were snapped or uprooted.							
EF0	SE of Pineville	Smith	MS		2151–2152	0.74 mi (1.19 km)	50 yd (46 m)	$12,000
EF0	A chicken house had its tin roof partially torn off, and multiple trees were downed.							
EF2	Southwestern Birmingham	Jefferson	AL		2255–2259	0.88 mi (1.42 km)	130 yd (120 m)	$0
EF2	A brief but strong tornado touched down near Midfield and impacted approximately 50 homes, many of which sustained varying degrees of roof damage and 15 of which were left uninhabitable due to heavy damage. Two of these small homes were nearly flattened. Many trees were snapped or uprooted along the path as well. Two people were injured.							

=== December 26 event ===
List of confirmed tornadoes – Saturday, December 26, 2015
EF#	Location	County / Parish	State	Start Coord.	Time (UTC)	Path length	Max width	Damage (2015 USD)
EF0	NE of Byars	McClain	OK		1957	0.1 mi (0.16 km)	20 yd (18 m)	Unknown
EF0	A storm chaser reported a brief tornado.							
EF0	N of Hubbard	Hill	TX		2003–2007	2.76 mi (4.44 km)	50 yd (46 m)	$15,000
EF0	A local fire department reported a tornado that damaged crops.							
EF0	NE of Eustace	Henderson	TX		2044–2046	0.9 mi (1.4 km)	40 yd (37 m)	$10,000
EF0	Trained storm spotters observed a tornado that damaged crops over open land.							
EF0	NNE of Emory	Rains	TX		2126–2127	0.69 mi (1.11 km)	75 yd (69 m)	$0
EF0	Trained storm spotters reported a brief tornado.							
EF0	NNW of Hillsboro	Hill	TX		2310–2312	1.6 mi (2.6 km)	80 yd (73 m)	$20,000
EF0	Trained storm spotters reported a brief tornado. It remained over open country and caused no damage.							
EF0	S of Sulphur Springs	Hopkins	TX		2333–2334	0.36 mi (0.58 km)	25 yd (23 m)	$0
EF0	A storm chaser observed a brief tornado.							
EF0	NE of Maypearl	Ellis	TX		2343–2344	1.58 mi (2.54 km)	50 yd (46 m)	$0
EF0	A local fire department reported a brief tornado.							
EF3	E of Midlothian to Glenn Heights	Ellis, Dallas	TX		0001–0013	8.52 mi (13.71 km)	125 yd (114 m)	$9,730,000
EF3	See Section on this tornado – 46 people were injured.							
EF4	Sunnyvale to Garland to Rowlett	Dallas, Rockwall	TX		0046–0102	13.04 mi (20.99 km)	550 yd (500 m)	$26,800,000
EF4	10 deaths – See article on this tornado – This was the second tornado produced by the Garland supercell. 468 people were injured.							
EF0	NE of Ennis	Ellis	TX		0100–0102	5.08 mi (8.18 km)	150 yd (140 m)	$40,000
EF0	A few barns were damaged.							
EF2	N of Lavon to N of Copeville	Collin	TX		0109–0115	5.29 mi (8.51 km)	300 yd (270 m)	$1,400,000
EF2	2 deaths – See section on this tornado – This was the last intense tornado produced by the Garland supercell. 119 people were injured.							
EF1	W of Farmersville	Collin	TX		0117–0123	4.47 mi (7.19 km)	300 yd (270 m)	$1,500,000
EF1	Several homes, including six mobile homes, were damaged or destroyed. This was the fourth tornado produced by the Garland supercell.							
EF1	SE of Blue Ridge	Collin	TX		0133–0138	5.21 mi (8.38 km)	100 yd (91 m)	$600,000
EF1	1 death – A log-construction frame home was damaged, and a metal high-tension truss tower was blown over. Multiple mobile homes sustained major damage, with a two-day old infant being killed in one of them. Fence posts were pulled out of the ground and trees were downed as well. Two people were injured. This was the fifth and final tornado produced by the Garland supercell.							

=== December 27 event ===
List of confirmed tornadoes – Sunday, December 27, 2015
EF#	Location	County / Parish	State	Start Coord.	Time (UTC)	Path length	Max width	Damage (2015 USD)
EF0	WSW of De Kalb	Bowie	TX		2106–2110	2.93 mi (4.72 km)	75 yd (69 m)	$15,000
EF0	The roof of a mobile home was partially removed, and several trees were snapped.							
EF1	NW of Gilmer	Upshur	TX		2124–2127	7.98 mi (12.84 km)	1,338 yd (1,223 m)	$45,000
EF1	A few outbuildings lost metal roofing panels, and several trees were downed, with a couple causing damage to two houses.							
EF1	NW of Hampton to ENE of Bearden	Calhoun, Ouachita	AR		2132–2146	7.1 mi (11.4 km)	100 yd (91 m)	$150,000
EF1	Part of the roof was blown off of a couple industrial buildings at Highland Industrial Park, several empty rail cars were blown over, and in Bearden, roofing material was ripped off several commercial buildings. A small gas station was also damaged. Several trees were downed along the path.							
EF1	E of Patmos	Hempstead	AR		2136–2137	0.84 mi (1.35 km)	350 yd (320 m)	$15,000
EF1	Pine trees were downed and a mobile home was damaged.							
EF1	ESE of Camden	Calhoun	AR		2156–2207	7.22 mi (11.62 km)	400 yd (370 m)	$55,000
EF1	An intermittent tornado destroyed two sheds, damaged the roof on a home, and downed several pine trees on a path that passed near Hampton. One pine tree fell on and crushed two cars.							
EF1	E of Willisville	Nevada	AR		2236–2244	3.85 mi (6.20 km)	353 yd (323 m)	$100,000
EF1	Several outbuildings were destroyed and a house sustained roof damage. Numerous trees were snapped and uprooted along the path.							
EF2	NNE of Marshall to SSE of Jefferson	Harrison	TX		2239–2251	7.78 mi (12.52 km)	300 yd (270 m)	$300,000
EF2	Two mobile homes and several outbuildings were destroyed, with pieces of tin roofing from one outbuilding being found at least a quarter-mile away. Multiple frame homes were damaged as well, and a pickup truck and storage trailer were tossed. Numerous trees were snapped and uprooted along the path.							
EF1	Hermitage to E of Banks	Bradley	AR		2306–2318	7.11 mi (11.44 km)	200 yd (180 m)	$75,000
EF1	An awning was damaged at Hermitage School, part of the roof was ripped off a chicken house, a shed was destroyed, and a home sustained minor damage. Many trees were downed.							
EF1	ENE of Lodi	Cass	TX		2309–2311	1.25 mi (2.01 km)	200 yd (180 m)	$0
EF1	Several trees were snapped or uprooted.							
EF1	W of Wilmar	Drew	AR		0006–0017	5.74 mi (9.24 km)	150 yd (140 m)	$60,000
EF1	The roof was ripped off of a house and thrown onto a shed, and several pine trees were downed.							
EF1	W of Blanchard	Caddo	LA		0210–0211	0.09 mi (0.14 km)	41 yd (37 m)	$5,000
EF1	Trees were snapped and uprooted along the path, and a mobile home sustained damage to its skirting.							
EF1	NNE of Blanchard	Caddo	LA		0216–0220	2.27 mi (3.65 km)	144 yd (132 m)	$250,000
EF1	Tornado moved through two mobile home parks, damaging numerous mobile homes. One of the mobile homes was blown off its foundation, while another was crushed by a tree. One outbuilding was destroyed and two others were damaged. Numerous trees were snapped and uprooted along the path.							
EF1	SW of Homer	Claiborne	LA		0510–0511	0.17 mi (0.27 km)	21 yd (19 m)	$0
EF1	Several trees were uprooted.							

=== December 28 event ===
List of confirmed tornadoes – Monday, December 28, 2015
EF#	Location	County / Parish	State	Start Coord.	Time (UTC)	Path length	Max width	Damage (2015 USD)
EF1	ENE of Walker	Livingston	LA		0853–0856	1.94 mi (3.12 km)	100 yd (91 m)	Unknown
EF1	A semi-truck was flipped and a trailer was moved. A building has its metal roof ripped off and a door blown inward.							
EF1	W of Laplace	St. John the Baptist	LA		0920–0925	0.6 mi (0.97 km)	150 yd (140 m)	Unknown
EF1	Roof and fence damage occurred, and several power poles were snapped.							
EF2	SW of Marianna	Lee	AR		1046–1051	5.75 mi (9.25 km)	40 yd (37 m)	$50,000
EF2	A mobile home was destroyed and homes sustained roof damage.							
EF1	NW of Seminary	Covington	MS		1143–1151	5.59 mi (9.00 km)	100 yd (91 m)	$100,000
EF1	One barn was destroyed, several homes sustained minor damage, and numerous trees were snapped or uprooted.							
EF1	SW of Chumuckla	Santa Rosa	FL		1430–1432	0.78 mi (1.26 km)	75 yd (69 m)	$10,000
EF1	A tornado tracked through a heavily forested area, uprooting pecan trees and snapping cedar and pines. The NWS survey team was unable to examine the entire path, and it is possible the tornado path extended further south.							
EF0	NNE of Trinity	Union	NC		2158–2201	0.9 mi (1.4 km)	75 yd (69 m)	$50,000
EF0	Five sheds and outbuildings were damaged or destroyed, the wall of one home sitting on concrete blocks was slightly shifted, a camper was rolled onto its side, and trees were downed.							

== See also ==
- Tornadoes of 2015
- List of United States tornadoes from September to October 2015
- List of United States tornadoes from January to March 2016
