= Tornado outbreak of November 16–18, 2015 =

2015 tornado outbreak in Kansas and Texas

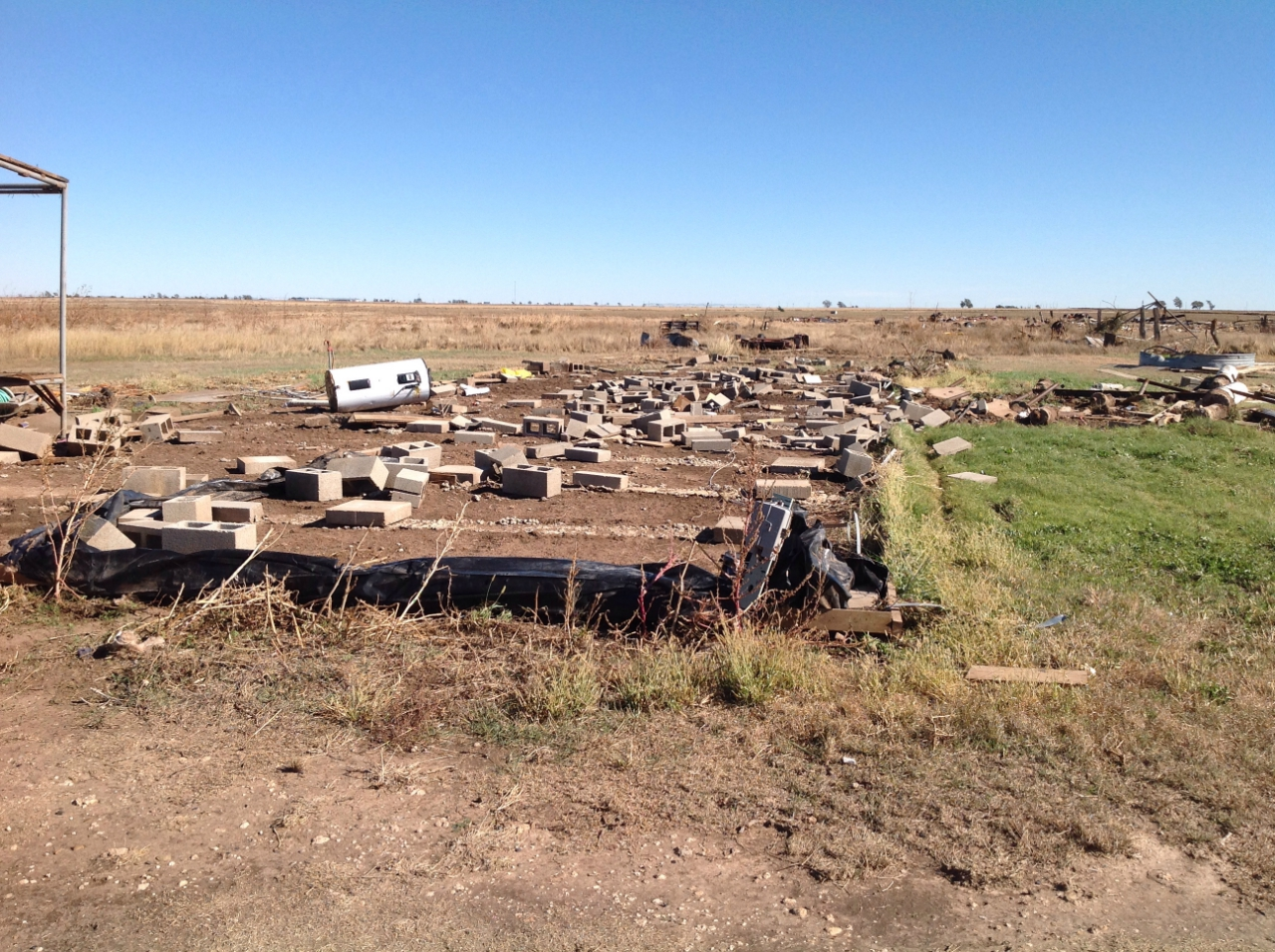
- Clockwise from top: Two tornadoes on the ground simultaneously north of Pampa, Texas near Codman – A radar scan showing two tornadic supercells near Pampa at 6:47 pm CST – Remains of a well-anchored mobile home that was completely swept away by the first EF3 tornado near Pampa

Meteorological history
- Duration: November 16–18, 2015

Tornado outbreak
- Tornadoes: 61
- Max. rating: EF3 tornado
- Duration: 2 days, 1 hour, 19 minutes
- Highest winds: Tornadic – 155 mph (249 km/h) near Kismet, Kansas and Pampa, Texas on November 16; Straight-line - 99 mph (159 km/h) near Red Rock, Oklahoma on November 17
- Largest hail: 2.00 in (5.1 cm) in diameter in multiple locations

Overall effects
- Injuries: 1
- Damage: >$1.832 million (2015 USD)
- Areas affected: Nebraska, Kansas, Oklahoma, Texas, Mississippi, Georgia
- Power outages: >47,000
- Part of the tornadoes of 2015

The tornado outbreak of November 16–18, 2015 was a highly unusual nocturnal late-season tornado outbreak that significantly impacted the lower Great Plains on November 16 before producing additional weaker tornadoes across parts of the Southern United States the following two days. The first day of the outbreak spawned multiple strong, long-track tornadoes, including two consecutive EF3 tornadoes that caused major damage near Pampa, Texas. Overall, the outbreak produced 61 tornadoes in all, and was described as by the National Weather Service office in Dodge City, Kansas as being "unprecedented in recorded history for southwest Kansas" given the magnitude and the late season. In addition, the tornado outbreak brought the first November tornadoes into northwest Kansas, and the first strong tornadoes in the Texas Panhandle in November, as well as the further west any F3/EF3 tornadoes touched down this late in the calendar year. Despite spawning multiple strong tornadoes after dark, no fatalities and only one minor injury occurred as a result of the outbreak.

== Meteorological synopsis ==
An intense mid-level trough moved from the desert Southwest United States into the south-central High Plains, and low-level flow brought moisture from the Gulf of Mexico into the region, allowing dew points to reach the 50s and low 60s. Strong wind shear supported supercell thunderstorm development.

== Confirmed tornadoes ==
Confirmed tornadoes by Enhanced Fujita rating
EFU	EF0	EF1	EF2	EF3	EF4	EF5	Total
0	23	30	5	3	0	0	61

=== November 16 event ===
List of confirmed tornadoes – Monday, November 16, 2015 (Note: All dates are based on the local time zone where the tornado touched down; however, all times are in Coordinated Universal Time for consistency.)
EF#	Location	County / Parish	State	Start Coord.	Time (UTC)	Path length	Max width	Damage (2015 USD)
EF0	S of Ulysses	Grant	KS	37.46°N 101.3541°W	2154–2155	0.13 mi (0.21 km)	25 yd (23 m)	$0
EF0	A storm chaser reported a brief tornado that caused no damage.							
EF0	ENE of Garden City to WSW of Eminence	Finney	KS	38.0194°N 100.6561°W	2314–2320	4.6 mi (7.4 km)	50 yd (46 m)	$0
EF0	A storm chaser reported a tornado that caused no damage.							
EF0	SE of Grinnell	Gove	KS	39.0038°N 100.5296°W	2320–2324	2.72 mi (4.38 km)	25 yd (23 m)	$0
EF0	A trained storm spotter reported a tornado that caused no damage.							
EF0	WSW of Grainfield	Gove	KS	39.0933°N 100.5244°W	2330–2332	1.83 mi (2.95 km)	25 yd (23 m)	$0
EF0	Law enforcement reported a tornado that caused no damage.							
EF1	Grainfield to E of Hoxie	Gove, Sheridan	KS	39.1161°N 100.4714°W	2334–0003	18.47 mi (29.72 km)	300 yd (270 m)	Unknown
EF1	Tornado struck the town of Grainfield, where numerous trees, power lines, and grain bins were damaged. A wood structure sustained damage, an abandoned house had its roof ripped off, and a quonset building was destroyed. A small shop, windows, and sheds were destroyed, and a second home sustained minor damage.							
EF3	NE of Liberal to NE of Montezuma	Seward, Meade， Gray	KS	37.0933°N 100.8699°W	2338–0056	51.26 mi (82.49 km)	2,000 yd (1,800 m)	Unknown
EF3	See section on this tornado							
EF0	WSW of Goodnight	Armstrong	TX	35.007°N 101.3°W	2344−2345	0.4 mi (0.64 km)	50 yd (46 m)	$0
EF0	Storm chasers observed a brief tornado that caused no damage.							
EF0	NNE of Skellytown	Roberts	TX	35.7525°N 101.0777°W	2344−2345	0.11 mi (0.18 km)	50 yd (46 m)	$0
EF0	A storm chaser observed a brief tornado that caused no visible damage.							
EF2	S of Alamota to W of Ness City	Lane, Ness	KS	38.2908°N 100.2937°W	2356–0020	16.52 mi (26.59 km)	1,500 yd (1,400 m)	Unknown
EF2	A large wedge tornado caused substantial damage to a farm, trees, power lines, and fences.							
EF1	SE of Spearman	Roberts	TX	35.953°N 100.962°W	0005–0015	0.26 mi (0.42 km)	50 yd (46 m)	$0
EF1	A brief tornado occurred in a very rural area of northwestern Roberts County, causing a windmill to collapse. A witness stated that a funnel was visible for about 10 minutes and the tornado tracked 4 to 5 miles (6.4 to 8.0 km).							
EF0	WNW of Groom	Carson	TX	35.207°N 101.1272°W	0009–0010	0.22 mi (0.35 km)	50 yd (46 m)	$0
EF0	Storm chasers reported a brief tornado touchdown just west of Groom, causing no visible damage.							
EF1	NE of Plains to N of Missler	Meade	KS	37.3593°N 100.5155°W	0019–0030	6.33 mi (10.19 km)	100 yd (91 m)	Unknown
EF1	This was a satellite tornado to the long-track EF3 tornado above. A house, some outbuildings, and irrigation pivot sprinklers were damaged.							
EF3	NNE of Groom to WNW of Miami	Gray, Roberts	TX	35.299°N 101.021°W	0020–0120	31.86 mi (51.27 km)	750 yd (690 m)	Unknown
EF3	See section on this tornado							
EF1	NNW of Ness City	Ness	KS	38.5343°N 99.998°W	0027–0039	3.93 mi (6.32 km)	200 yd (180 m)	Unknown
EF1	Trees, vehicles, power lines, and buildings sustained damage. A historic 115-year-old stone and frame barn was destroyed.							
EF1	Lenora	Norton	KS	39.5828°N 100.0559°W	0036–0048	6 mi (9.7 km)	100 yd (91 m)	Unknown
EF1	Tornado moved directly through Lenora, where windows and garage doors were damaged or blown out. An aluminum door was folded and mangled, outbuildings sustained minor damage, and trees were blown through windows. A Nex-Tech building had its roof ripped off.							
EF2	NW of Groom to SE of White Deer	Carson, Gray	TX	35.253°N 101.158°W	0042–0055	10.42 mi (16.77 km)	175 yd (160 m)	Unknown
EF2	Strong tornado completely destroyed a well-built metal frame outbuilding. A home had its windows broken and roof decking material removed, with the roof uplifted. Large pieces of wood were embedded in the roof. A large truck was moved 50 yards (46 m).							
EF0	SSE of Perryton	Ochiltree	TX	36.3°N 100.763°W	0044–0050	3.66 mi (5.89 km)	100 yd (91 m)	Unknown
EF0	An emergency manager reported a brief tornado. Little to no damage was observed.							
EF2	E of Seminole	Gaines	TX	32.6562°N 102.4463°W	0046–0056	5.57 mi (8.96 km)	100 yd (91 m)	Unknown
EF2	Power poles, irrigation pivot equipment, and a cotton field were damaged. EF2 damage was inflicted to a well service rig.							
EF1	ESE of Perryton to SW of Booker	Ochiltree	TX	36.361°N 100.664°W	0052–0059	5.78 mi (9.30 km)	200 yd (180 m)	Unknown
EF1	Trees, a barbed wire fence, and the roof to a barn sustained damage from this tornado. Three power poles were broken as well.							
EF2	S of Ensign to E of Cimarron	Gray, Ford	KS	37.6301°N 100.2329°W	0055–0119	14.94 mi (24.04 km)	500 yd (460 m)	Unknown
EF2	A well-built metal frame outbuilding was heavily damaged, with its metal supports severely twisted and bent as a result of this large wedge tornado. Numerous power poles were snapped, large trees were uprooted, irrigation pivots were flipped, and three homes sustained roof and window damage.							
EF1	WSW of Booker, TX to S of Elmwood, OK	Ochiltree (TX), Beaver (OK)	TX, OK	36.443°N 100.575°W	0100–0108	5.18 mi (8.34 km)	400 yd (370 m)	Unknown
EF1	Fence and tree damage was observed near the Texas–Oklahoma state line, and multiple power flashes were observed just west of the town of Booker.							
EF0	S of Ogallah	Trego	KS	38.8976°N 99.7502°W	0106–0109	1.66 mi (2.67 km)	100 yd (91 m)	$0
EF0	Trees were uprooted, and tree limbs were snapped.							
EF3	E of Pampa	Gray	TX	35.457°N 100.966°W	0106–0119	10.92 mi (17.57 km)	500 yd (460 m)	Unknown
EF3	See section on this tornado							
EF1	NE of Norton	Norton	KS	39.8386°N 99.8382°W	0110–0116	3.85 mi (6.20 km)	400 yd (370 m)	$83,000
EF1	Twelve electrical poles were downed, a flagpole was bent in half, a trailer house and outbuildings were damaged, and a radio station lost its ability to broadcast.							
EF0	S of Beaver	Beaver	OK	36.534°N 100.518°W	0110–0118	4.22 mi (6.79 km)	100 yd (91 m)	$0
EF0	Storm chasers observed this tornado that caused no known damage.							
EF1	NE of Pampa to NNW of Miami	Gray, Roberts	TX	35.5948°N 100.8281°W	0122–0144	16 mi (26 km)	300 yd (270 m)	Unknown
EF1	This tornado paralleled and crossed the path of the first Pampa EF3 tornado and was produced by the same supercell that produced the second Pampa EF3 tornado. Damage was confined to wooden power poles broken in Roberts County.							
EF1	NW of Almena to E of Hollinger	Norton, Furnas	KS, NE	39.9172°N 99.7508°W	0124–0157	18.45 mi (29.69 km)	400 yd (370 m)	$50,000
EF1	Trees, power poles, signs, outbuildings, fences, windmills, and small farm machinery were damaged. The western side roof covering was ripped from a barn, and several grain carts on the property were moved.							
EF0	NE of Borger	Hutchinson	TX	35.7491°N 101.2528°W	0143–0144	0.56 mi (0.90 km)	50 yd (46 m)	$0
EF0	A storm chaser observed a brief tornado that touched down over open country, causing no damage.							
EF0	N of Miami to SW of Canadian	Roberts, Hemphill	TX	35.7894°N 100.6218°W	0145–0155	7.21 mi (11.60 km)	50 yd (46 m)	$0
EF0	This tornado remained over open country, causing no damage.							
EF0	WNW of Panhandle	Potter	TX	35.428°N 101.628°W	0158–0159	0.38 mi (0.61 km)	50 yd (46 m)	$0
EF0	This brief tornado was reported in an open field in rural eastern Potter County, causing no damage.							
EF0	W of WaKeeney	Trego	KS	39.0255°N 99.986°W	0219–0220	0.8 mi (1.3 km)	100 yd (91 m)	Unknown
EF0	A machine shed was destroyed, and bales of feed were moved.							
EF1	NW of Glazier, TX to SSW of May, OK	Hemphill (TX), Lipscomb (TX), Ellis (OK)	TX, OK	36.0329°N 100.2721°W	0220–0313	43.03 mi (69.25 km)	200 yd (180 m)	Unknown
EF1	One home sustained roof damage, sheet metal debris from an outbuilding was scattered across a field, and some small power poles were snapped. Oil field equipment and fences were damaged, and multiple trees and tree limbs were snapped along the path as well. Trees and power lines were damaged after the tornado crossed into Oklahoma.							
EF1	SSE of Farnsworth to SSE of Perryton	Ochiltree	TX	36.0773°N 100.8625°W	0226–0251	14.59 mi (23.48 km)	70 yd (64 m)	Unknown
EF1	Power poles, fences, and a few oil equipment sheds were damaged along the path.							
EF0	SSE of Booker	Lipscomb	TX	36.322°N 100.543°W	0259–0307	4.69 mi (7.55 km)	100 yd (91 m)	$0
EF0	This brief tornado was observed in a rural area. Little or no damage occurred due to a lack of structures.							
EF2	SSE of May to NE of Selman	Ellis, Harper	OK	36.522°N 99.729°W	0318–0351	27.2 mi (43.8 km)	400 yd (370 m)	$7,000
EF2	A home was damaged, sheds were destroyed, outbuildings were heavily damaged, power poles were broken, and trees were damaged along the path.							
EF1	NNE of Darrouzett, TX to N of Logan	Beaver	OK	36.5114°N 100.2813°W	0324–0337	8.93 mi (14.37 km)	500 yd (460 m)	Unknown
EF1	Several barns and outbuildings were destroyed, and additional homes sustained minimal damage. Numerous power poles and trees were snapped.							
EF1	NW of Freedom, OK to SE of Coldwater, KS	Woods (OK), Comanche (KS)	OK, KS	36.955°N 99.324°W	0409–0438	19.33 mi (31.11 km)	810 yd (740 m)	Unknown
EF1	An old home sustained major damage, and buildings at an oil field were destroyed. Trees were snapped, significant tree damage occurred, and farm implements and outbuildings were damaged or destroyed as well.							
EF1	E of Coldwater	Comanche	KS	37.2193°N 99.1161°W	0438–0447	5.31 mi (8.55 km)	460 yd (420 m)	Unknown
EF1	A 0.25 mi (0.40 km) stretch of power poles were downed. Large branches were broken off trees.							

=== November 17 event ===
List of confirmed tornadoes – Tuesday, November 17, 2015
EF#	Location	County / Parish	State	Start Coord.	Time (UTC)	Path length	Max width	Damage (2015 USD)
EF0	SE of Keller	Tarrant	TX	32.91°N 97.23°W	0928–0929	0.9 mi (1.4 km)	30 yd (27 m)	$210,000
EF0	Approximately 10 homes sustained minor roof damage, and several trees were downed.							
EF1	SSE of Corinth to NNE of Lake Dallas	Denton	TX	33.13°N 97.06°W	0944–0948	3.07 mi (4.94 km)	50 yd (46 m)	$500,000
EF1	Several homes sustained minor roof damage, a few homes had their garage doors destroyed, a car wash suffered severe damage, several business signs were damaged or destroyed, and a hotel sustained significant roof damage.							
EF1	E of College Station	Grimes	TX	30.6007°N 96.124°W	1053–1104	9.25 mi (14.89 km)	50 yd (46 m)	$200,000
EF1	Numerous large trees were snapped or uprooted. Two trailers were thrown and destroyed, numerous barns, outbuildings, and mobile homes suffered severe damage, and tin and lumber debris were tossed over 0.5 mi (0.80 km).							
EF1	E of Checotah	McIntosh	OK	35.4363°N 95.4247°W	1143–1148	4.7 mi (7.6 km)	300 yd (270 m)	$150,000
EF1	A number of outbuildings and a chicken house were destroyed, the roofs of several homes were damaged, trees were snapped or uprooted, and power lines were downed.							
EF1	SE of Edwards	Hinds	MS	32.3039°N 90.5813°W	0333–0335	1.9 mi (3.1 km)	50 yd (46 m)	$10,000
EF1	Several trees were snapped or uprooted.							

=== November 18 event ===
List of confirmed tornadoes – Wednesday, November 18, 2015
EF#	Location	County / Parish	State	Start Coord.	Time (UTC)	Path length	Max width	Damage (2015 USD)
EF1	NNE of Pelahatchie to NNE of Forkville	Rankin, Scott	MS	32.3749°N 89.7474°W	0540–0550	8.73 mi (14.05 km)	440 yd (400 m)	$83,000
EF1	Numerous trees were downed or uprooted. A mobile home was rolled and destroyed. Some tin was removed from the roof of a home, and a shed sustained some damage. An old, unused chicken house was heavily damaged.							
EF1	NNW of Forkville	Scott	MS	32.4789°N 89.6955°W	0547–0551	2.98 mi (4.80 km)	250 yd (230 m)	$12,000
EF1	Multiple trees were snapped or uprooted.							
EF1	S of Lena	Scott	MS	32.5311°N 89.6158°W	0555–0559	3.54 mi (5.70 km)	200 yd (180 m)	$10,000
EF1	Multiple trees were snapped or uprooted, and a couple trees and limbs were downed.							
EF1	SE of Carthage	Leake	MS	32.6771°N 89.5495°W	0605–0614	7.27 mi (11.70 km)	400 yd (370 m)	$50,000
EF1	A chicken house had parts of its roof taken off, and several power lines and numerous trees were downed.							
EF0	E of Lena	Leake	MS	32.6014°N 89.5378°W	0605–0606	0.46 mi (0.74 km)	75 yd (69 m)	$5,000
EF0	A brief, weak tornado damaged a few trees.							
EF1	E of Carthage to NW of Edinburg	Leake	MS	32.7503°N 89.4741°W	0614–0624	8.11 mi (13.05 km)	500 yd (460 m)	$40,000
EF1	An outbuilding was destroyed, power lines were downed, and numerous trees were snapped and uprooted.							
EF1	NE of Midway to SE of Zama	Leake, Neshoba	MS	32.8394°N 89.4136°W	0621–0631	7.35 mi (11.83 km)	250 yd (230 m)	$13,000
EF1	Dozens of pine trees were damaged along the path.							
EF1	ESE of Zama	Leake, Neshoba, Winston	MS	32.9276°N 89.3241°W	0630–0634	3.02 mi (4.86 km)	300 yd (270 m)	$13,000
EF1	Part of a roof was torn off of a house, with roofing debris thrown into the highway, and trees were snapped and uprooted.							
EF1	NE of Zama	Winston	MS	33.0248°N 89.2674°W	0641–0643	2.21 mi (3.56 km)	300 yd (270 m)	$8,000
EF1	Numerous trees were snapped and uprooted.							
EF1	SW of Highpoint	Winston	MS	33.0895°N 89.2228°W	0645–0649	1.69 mi (2.72 km)	150 yd (140 m)	$20,000
EF1	Numerous trees were snapped and uprooted, one of which landed on a home.							
EF0	E of Algoma to SSW of Endville	Pontotoc	MS	34.1839°N 88.9627°W	0706–0718	9.16 mi (14.74 km)	250 yd (230 m)	$100,000
EF0	A storage building and outbuildings were damaged, and trees were damaged along the path, one of which fell on a house.							
EF0	NW of Wells to E of Kolola Springs	Lowndes	MS	33.6196°N 88.4198°W	0953–0956	2.2 mi (3.5 km)	50 yd (46 m)	$8,000
EF0	A brief tornado uprooted a few trees and broke off several large limbs.							
EF0	SSW of Mossy Head	Walton	FL	30.63°N 86.35°W	1735–1736	0.01 mi (0.016 km)	25 yd (23 m)	$0
EF0	A brief tornado touched down on Eglin Air Force Base property and displaced magnolia tree branches roughly 200 yards (180 m).							
EF0	NE of Mossy Head	Walton	FL	30.8231°N 86.2279°W	1805–1807	0.07 mi (0.11 km)	50 yd (46 m)	$0
EF0	The public reported a brief tornado touchdown north of Eglin Air Force Base property, causing no damage.							
EF1	WSW of Palmetto	Coweta	GA	33.5047°N 84.72°W	2148–2149	0.19 mi (0.31 km)	200 yd (180 m)	$50,000
EF1	Tornado moved through a subdivision, snapping small trees and damaging five homes. One of the homes had its front porch and a section of its roof lifted off, with the debris being thrown nearly 50 yards (46 m) away. Fences were blown down and 4 by 4 beams were snapped near their bases as well.							
EF1	Northern Fairburn	Fulton	GA	33.5584°N 84.6295°W	2159–2203	2.64 mi (4.25 km)	200 yd (180 m)	$150,000
EF1	Near the beginning of the path, goal posts and bleachers sustained minor damage at Creekside High School. The tornado moved through residential areas of Fairburn, snapping and uprooting numerous large trees and causing minor structural damage to several homes. Some of the trees landed on homes and caused significant damage. A small, unsecured shed was torn apart as well. One minor injury occurred when a tree fell on a car near a country club.							
EF0	SE of Tucker	DeKalb	GA	33.8361°N 84.1978°W	2247–2248	0.12 mi (0.19 km)	100 yd (91 m)	$60,000
EF0	Two locations sustained structural damage from a brief tornado. The north-facing front wall was ripped apart at one location in the area, and the roof and metal siding of another location were partially peeled back. Additionally, two pine trees were uprooted.							
EF0	N of Gretna	Gadsden	FL	30.614°N 84.6823°W	2305–2313	2.67 mi (4.30 km)	50 yd (46 m)	$0
EF0	A tornado tracked across a rural area and blew down a tree.							

=== Liberal–Haggard, Kansas ===
Liberal–Haggard, Kansas
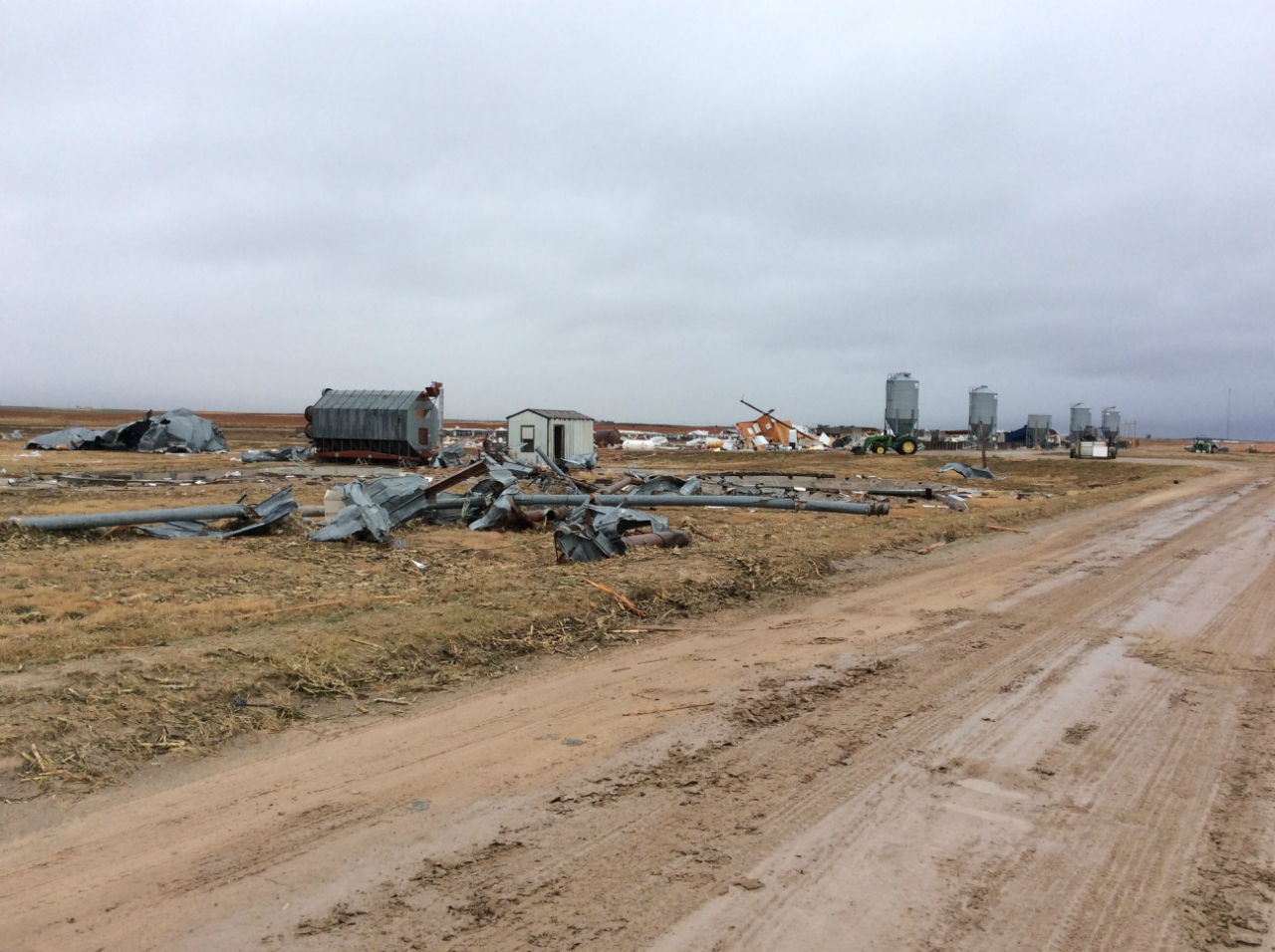
- Remains of a well-built pig farm that was completely swept away at EF3 intensity near Kismet, Kansas.

Meteorological history
- Formed: November 16, 2015, 5:38 p.m. CDT (UTC−05:00)
- Dissipated: November 16, 2015, 6:56 p.m. CDT
- Duration: 1 hour, 18 minutes

EF3 tornado
- on the Enhanced Fujita scale
- Highest winds: 155 mph (249 km/h)

Overall effects
- Fatalities: 0
- Injuries: 0

This strong, long-tracked, mile-wide tornado touched down near Colorado Road L, tracking eastward as it inflicted minor EF0 to EF1 damage as it tore off roof panels from small outbuildings and snapped power lines near Colorado Road O. The tornado would not hit any other structures for nearly 5 miles before reaching EF1 to EF2 intensity as more power lines were snapped near a group of industrial buildings and a manufactured home had its walls completely collapsed near Colorado Road R.

The tornado once again began to track across empty terrain as it began to intensify before reaching peak EF3 intensity on Colorado Road 15 and Colorado Road T as a large oil tank was thrown, a metal hog farm was completely destroyed, a nearby home had its exterior walls collapsed and a group of hardwood trees were debarked and mangled. The tornado would then cause no damage for the next 4 miles before reaching EF2 intensity for a second time as multiple pivots were flipped, some with wheels removed, and a mile long stretch of wooden poles were snapped on Colorado Road V.

Tracking across farmland for 1.5 miles the tornado maintained its EF2 intensity as another group of pivots were flipped and more wooden power lines were snipped, with the tornado reaching its peak width of one mile wide. The tornado would then cross into Meade County, maintaining EF2 intensity as it flipped pivots and a small barn and snapped 3/4 of a mile of poles. The tornado would then weaken as it flipped pivots, damaged outbuildings and damaged a J Road. The tornado would track across more farmland, intensifying to EF2 strength once again as a mile of power lines were snapped and a large number of pivots were flipped. A small EF1 satellite formed at this time, flipping pivots, damaging outbuildings and shattering the glass of a small home. The tornado would continue to track across the Kansas countryside at EF1 intensity as more pivots were flipped and a small family home and outbuilding suffered minor damage.

The tornado then crossed into Gray County, flipping more pivots as it crossed J J Road, maintaining EF1 intensity as it continued across farmland before downing multiple power lines on HH Road. The tornado would then cross empty land before intensifying to EF2 strength on FF Road where a home had its exterior walls collapsed, a small outbuilding was destroyed, and multiple power lines were snapped. The tornado would track parallel to Highway 23 at EF1 intensity, snapping trees and causing minor damage to transmission lines before briefly intensifying to EF2 strength as power lines were snapped near Haggard, Kansas. The tornado would begin to quickly weaken after crossing US highway 56 as it flipped pivots before dissipating on X Road.

The tornado caused no injuries or fatalities along its 51-mile path.

=== Groom–Pampa–Miami, Texas ===
Groom–Pampa–Miami, Texas
- The first of two EF3 tornadoes to impact the Pampa, Texas area as seen east of Pampa.

Meteorological history
- Formed: November 16, 2015, 6:20 p.m. CDT (UTC−05:00)
- Dissipated: November 16, 2015, 7:20 p.m. CDT
- Duration: 1 hour

EF3 tornado
- on the Enhanced Fujita scale
- Highest winds: 140 mph (230 km/h)

Overall effects
- Fatalities: 0
- Injuries: 0

This strong, long-tracked tornado touched down on Willis Road, crossing Bowers Road and a nearby field at EF0 intensity, downing a group of power lines on FM 293. Continuing east, the tornado would maintain it's EF0 intensity, flipping an irrigation system near Boydston Road. The tornado began to rapidly intensify to EF2 strength near Deep Lake, snapping multiple power lines on Baggerman Road. Marinating it's EF2 strength, the tornado would cross Davis Road, before snapping more power lines on State Highway 70.

The tornado would then weaken back to EF0 strength as it crossed through mostly farmland, uprooting softwood trees on State Highway 273. The tornado would begin to re-intensify in nearby fields before reaching EF2 intensity for a second time as multiple power lines were snapped and trees were debarked on US Highway 60. The tornado would then intensify to EF3 strength for the first time as trees were debarked, nearby well-anchored mobile homes were swept and a nearby barn was completely destroyed.

The tornado continued across mostly empty land for just over 6 miles before reaching peak intensity near Codman Lane as high tension transmission lines were toppled and nearby ground was scoured. The tornado would then begin to gradually weaken as it crossed through more farmlands, inflicting its final damage at EF2 intensity to a group of small trees that were debarked. The tornado would then re-enter more farmlands before lifting near FM 283.

The tornado caused no fatalities or injuries along its 35-mile path.

=== Pampa, Texas ===
Pampa, Texas
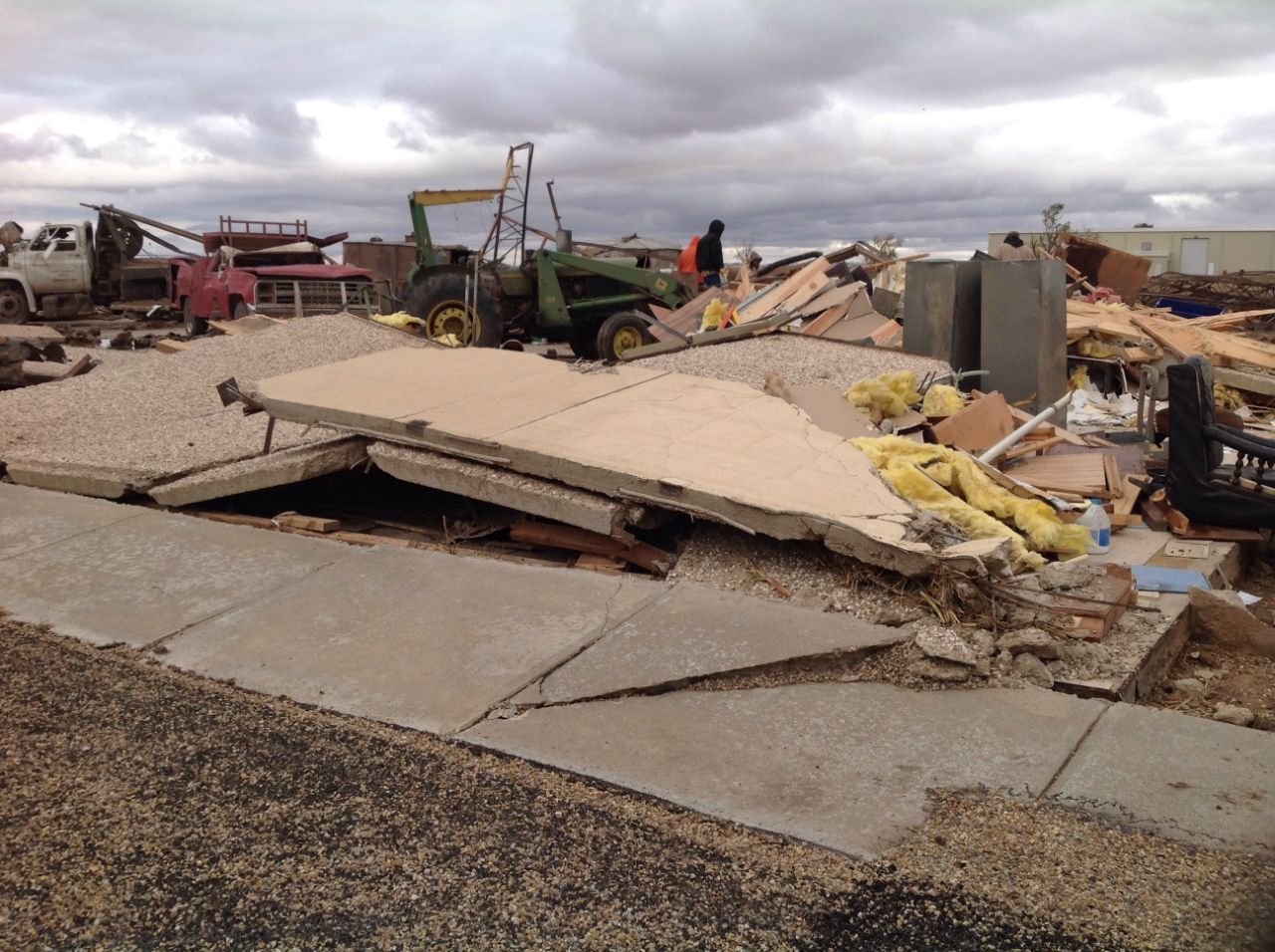
- A chemical plant near Pampa, Texas that was destroyed by the second EF3 tornado.

Meteorological history
- Formed: November 16, 2015, 7:06 p.m. CDT (UTC−05:00)
- Dissipated: November 16, 2015, 7:19 p.m. CDT
- Duration: 13 minutes

EF3 tornado
- on the Enhanced Fujita scale
- Highest winds: 155 mph (249 km/h)

Overall effects
- Fatalities: 0
- Injuries: 0

The second EF3 tornado to impact Pampa, Texas on November 16 first touched down near County Road 10, intensifying as it crossed FM 749 at EF1 intensity, causing minor damage to softwood trees. The tornado would then track across rural areas, intensifying to EF2 strength on County Road J as a manufactured home's roof was removed and another nearby manufactured home was completely swept away.

The tornado then tracked across empty land at EF0 intensity, causing minor damage to farm equipment on Texas 273. The tornado continued once again across farmland, intensifying to EF2-EF3 strength, crossing US Highway 60 and striking an industrial area at peak intensity in an industrial area where many metal-framed industrial buildings, including a well-built chemical plant, were destroyed, trees were debarked, and a nearby home suffered minor damage to its roof and walls. Several nearby cars were thrown into the rubble.

The tornado then weakened as it crossed County Road E, snapping lampposts and completely destroying an outbuilding, throwing debris into a nearby grove of trees. The tornado would deal no further damage before lifting near 13 Road.

The tornado caused no fatalities or injuries along its 11-mile path. As a result of chemical leaks caused by the tornado, Hazmat was deployed.

== Impact ==
As a result of the outbreak over 47,000 people were left without power. A train was derailed near Miami, Texas, which was blocked off by power lines, delaying first responders and trapping the crew. Over 1.8 million dollars in damage was inflicted. Corn stalks lofted by the tornado landed back as hail.

== Non-tornadic effects ==
A significant winter storm occurred on the backend of the tornado outbreak. On November 17, whiteout conditions forced 174 mi (280 km) of I-70 to close, from the intersection with E-470 to Goodland, Kansas. A 55 mi (89 km) stretch of I-25 was also closed across southern Colorado and northern New Mexico. The storm also brought flight cancellations at Denver International Airport, where 4 in (10 cm) of snow fell. Up to 6 in (15 cm) of snow fell in western Oklahoma on November 18 after the tornado outbreak. The storm was unofficially named Winter Storm Ajax by The Weather Channel.
