= Carnella Barnes =

Carnella Barnes (1911–1997; née Jamison) was an African-American ordained minister in the Christian Church (Disciples of Christ) denomination. She was one of the first women ordained in the denomination. She served as director of the Avalon Community Center, in Los Angeles, California, for thirteen years. She served as president of the Los Angeles Church Women United, and was the first black woman to be elected president of the International Christian Women's Fellowship in the Christian Church (Disciples of Christ). She was also an advocate for senior citizens, and established the first AARP chapter in Los Angeles.

== Biography ==
Carnella Jamison was born in the small town of Edwards, Mississippi, on January 11, 1911. Her parents, Samuel and Anna Jamison, lived on a small farm, and had eight children, of which Carnella was the youngest. Her mother died when she was five, and her father later remarried. At age 14, Carnella went to boarding school at the Southern Christian Institute, where she earned an associate degree education. She taught elementary school for three years, before going to Talladega College in Alabama for further education.

Raised in a Baptist family, she joined the Disciples of Christ denomination as a young adult, and became the president of the Disciples' national youth movement. After graduation from college, she became the National Field Secretary for African-American missionary societies for the United Christian Mission Society, the mission society for the Christian Church (Disciples of Christ), in Indianapolis, Indiana. She left this post to study theology at Chicago Theological Seminary, where she obtained a master of divinity degree. She was ordained in 1939. She was one of the first women to be ordained in the Disciples of Christ.

In 1945, she moved to Los Angeles, California, to serve as the executive secretary of the Avalon Community Center, which was a ministry of the Avalon Christian Church, located near the city center. She led the center for the next thirteen years. Under her leadership, the center developed a wide variety of services to the community, including summer jobs programs for youth and programming for senior citizens. She also served as the president of the Los Angeles Church Women United chapter.

Jamison married Anderson Barnes in 1945. The couple had triplets, and Carnella Barnes raised her children while working. Taking an interest in the local education system, Barnes decided to run for the Los Angeles School Board in 1952. While she lost the race, she received more than 100,000 votes.

In 1962, she went to work for the Los Angeles Department of Senior Citizens Affairs, eventually becoming the deputy director. While there, she organized the first AARP chapter in Los Angeles. She also testified before Congress, advocating for better legal representation for seniors. She left the department in 1976, to be a program consultant for Los Angeles county, and later to work for a community program for seniors.

In 1974 she was elected to be the president of the International Christian Women's Fellowship, at the Disciples of Christ national gathering, held at Purdue University. She served a four-year term. Her election was historic, as she was the first black woman to head the national women's board for the pre-dominantly white denomination.

Barnes died on January 4, 1997, a week before her 86th birthday.
