= Mazie O. Tyson =

American geographer (c. 1900 – 1975)

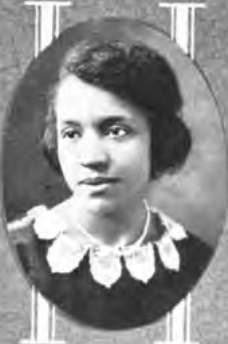
- Mazie O. Tyson, from the Howard University yearbook in 1921.
- Died: March 3, 1975; U.S. Virgin Islands
- Other names: Mazie Tyson-Scott
- Occupation: Professor of geography
- Years active: 1920s–1970s

Mazie Oylee Tyson (born about 1900 – March 3, 1975) was an American geographer who taught at historically-black colleges from the 1920s into the 1970s, including over twenty years at Tennessee State College.

== Early life and education ==
Tyson was originally from Jacksonville, Florida. She attended Florida A & M College for two years, and graduated from Howard University in 1921. In 1937 she earned a master's degree in geography at Ohio State University, with a thesis titled "A Florida Phosphate Landscape." She did doctoral work at Syracuse University, but health problems prevented the completion of her doctorate.

== Career ==
Tyson taught at Bennett College, Bethune-Cookman College, Florida A & M College, and Southern University, before joining the geography department at Tennessee State College in 1946. She taught there until 1969, and was considered a "legend" by colleagues for her long teaching career.

During World War II, Tyson headed a panel in Leon County, Florida, to monitor black businesses' compliance with wartime price regulations. She wrote about war work in articles "War and Post-War Challenges to Geographers" (1944), and "What Mobilization For Peace Can Learn From Mobilization For War" (1945).

Tyson was active in the Nashville branch of the American Association of University Women, and in the sorority Zeta Phi Beta. In 1954 and 1955, she took leave from the college to work in the United States Virgin Islands as a teacher and consultant.

== Personal life ==
Mazie Tyson married fellow professor Aurelius Southall Scott in 1928; they ran a summer camp together in Ohio, and were on the faculty together at Bethune-Cookman College, before they separated in the 1930s. She retired from teaching in 1970, and died from cancer and heart failure at a hospital on Saint Thomas, in the Virgin Islands, in 1975.
