= List of United States tornadoes from September to October 2015 =

Lists of tornadoes

This is a list of all tornadoes that were confirmed by local offices of the National Weather Service in the United States from September and October 2015.

== September ==
Confirmed tornadoes by Enhanced Fujita rating
EFU	EF0	EF1	EF2	EF3	EF4	EF5	Total
0	10	6	1	0	0	0	17

=== September 8 event ===
List of confirmed tornadoes – Tuesday, September 8, 2015 (Note: All dates are based on the local time zone where the tornado touched down; however, all times are in Coordinated Universal Time for consistency.)
EF#	Location	County / Parish	State	Start Coord.	Time (UTC)	Path length	Max width	Damage (2015 USD)
EF1	S of Rose City	Ogemaw	MI	44.38°N 84.12°W	1947 – 1958	8.93 mi (14.37 km)	75 yd (69 m)	$40,000
EF1	A number of trees were downed or snapped; several homes and other structures were damaged by fallen trees.							

=== September 10 event ===
List of confirmed tornadoes – Thursday, September 10, 2015
EF#	Location	County / Parish	State	Start Coord.	Time (UTC)	Path length	Max width	Damage (2015 USD)
EF0	SW of Kilbourne	Mason	IL	40.1195°N 90.0733°W	2145 – 2146	0.21 mi (0.34 km)	75 yd (69 m)	$20,000
EF0	A home sustained shingles and siding damage, with tree branches blown through a few windows. Numerous power lines were downed.							
EF1	SE of Keene	Wabaunsee	KS	38.9099°N 95.9673°W	0116 – 0122	3.46 mi (5.57 km)	50 yd (46 m)	$0
EF1	Large trees were snapped at their trunks, and a home sustained minor roof damage.							

=== September 12 event ===
List of confirmed tornadoes – Saturday, September 12, 2015
EF#	Location	County / Parish	State	Start Coord.	Time (UTC)	Path length	Max width	Damage (2015 USD)
EF0	NW of Starke	Bradford	FL	29.98°N 82.16°W	1730 – 1735	2.55 mi (4.10 km)	33 yd (30 m)	$0
EF0	A house roof was damaged, a barn was mostly destroyed, and many trees were snapped.							

=== September 16 event ===
List of confirmed tornadoes – Wednesday, September 16, 2015
EF#	Location	County / Parish	State	Start Coord.	Time (UTC)	Path length	Max width	Damage (2015 USD)
EF0	Davie	Broward	FL	26.069°N 80.321°W	2234 – 2244	2.32 mi (3.73 km)	40 yd (37 m)	Unknown
EF0	Numerous trees were snapped or uprooted. Two homes each had approximately 12 shingles shifted or removed.							

=== September 18 event ===
List of confirmed tornadoes – Friday, September 18, 2015
EF#	Location	County / Parish	State	Start Coord.	Time (UTC)	Path length	Max width	Damage (2015 USD)
EF1	S of Frankfort	Will	IL	41.4164°N 87.86°W	2144 – 2153	2.6 mi (4.2 km)	50 yd (46 m)	$70,000
EF1	Four to five homes sustained minor roof damage. Several trees were snapped or downed.							
EF1	SW of Hillsdale	Miami	KS	38.6412°N 94.9531°W	0009 – 0035	9.26 mi (14.90 km)	100 yd (91 m)	Unknown
EF1	A single wide manufactured home was rolled. Three unsecured recreational vehicles were rolled and destroyed.							
EF1	Freeman	Cass	MO	38.637°N 94.5558°W	0057 – 0113	5.19 mi (8.35 km)	100 yd (91 m)	Unknown
EF1	The tornado struck a high school football field, causing extensive damage to the stands and scoreboard. Trees and power lines were downed.							
EF0	N of Harrisonville	Cass	MO	38.6102°N 94.3593°W	0132 – 0135	2.27 mi (3.65 km)	25 yd (23 m)	Unknown
EF0	A Walmart sustained minor damage.							

=== September 22 event ===
List of confirmed tornadoes – Tuesday, September 22, 2015
EF#	Location	County / Parish	State	Start Coord.	Time (UTC)	Path length	Max width	Damage (2015 USD)
EF0	N of St. David	Cochise	AZ	31.9444°N 110.1839°W	2240 – 2242	0.62 mi (1.00 km)	25 yd (23 m)	$0
EF0	Members of the public reported a brief tornado.							

=== September 23 event ===
List of confirmed tornadoes – Wednesday, September 23, 2015
EF#	Location	County / Parish	State	Start Coord.	Time (UTC)	Path length	Max width	Damage (2015 USD)
EF0	SE of David City	Butler	NE	41.2104°N 97.1071°W	2244 – 2246	1.53 mi (2.46 km)	50 yd (46 m)	$0
EF0	Video obtained from Twitter revealed a brief tornado in a rural area.							

=== September 24 event ===
List of confirmed tornadoes – Thursday, September 24, 2015
EF#	Location	County / Parish	State	Start Coord.	Time (UTC)	Path length	Max width	Damage (2015 USD)
EF2	Johns Island	Charleston	SC	32.7192°N 80.0552°W	0442 – 0459	6.85 mi (11.02 km)	800 yd (730 m)	$1,540,000
EF2	A total of 51 structures were damaged, including 18 with minor damage and 33 with moderate or worse damage. A well-built brick house had its roof almost completely removed and some of its exterior walls demolished, and a ground level air conditioner and much of the roof was tossed about 150 yd (140 m). Another well-built home had its entire back portion ripped off. Thousands and thousands of trees were snapped or uprooted, with many falling on structures, vehicles, and roadways.							

=== September 26 event ===
List of confirmed tornadoes – Saturday, September 26, 2015
EF#	Location	County / Parish	State	Start Coord.	Time (UTC)	Path length	Max width	Damage (2015 USD)
EF0	Petronila	Nueces	TX	27.6747°N 97.6312°W	2015 – 2016	0.31 mi (0.50 km)	25 yd (23 m)	$0
EF0	Members of the public reported a brief tornado.							
EF0	E of Alice	Jim Wells	TX	27.7534°N 98.0302°W	2048 – 2049	0.36 mi (0.58 km)	50 yd (46 m)	$0
EF0	Members of the public shared a video on social media of a brief tornado.							

=== September 29 event ===
List of confirmed tornadoes – Tuesday, September 29, 2015
EF#	Location	County / Parish	State	Start Coord.	Time (UTC)	Path length	Max width	Damage (2015 USD)
EF0	S of Vanderbilt Beach	Collier	FL	26.25°N 81.823°W	1400 – 1402	0.06 mi (0.097 km)	10 yd (9.1 m)	$0
EF0	A waterspout moved ashore, tossing branches and other tree debris.							
EF0	Laurel	Prince George's, Howard	MD	39.0958°N 76.8411°W	0202 – 0213	4.4 mi (7.1 km)	75 yd (69 m)	Unknown
EF0	The facade of a commercial building, the roofs of several homes, and multiple trees were damaged.							
EF1	NW of Lancaster	Lancaster	PA	40.0501°N 76.371°W	0440 – 0445	2.53 mi (4.07 km)	75 yd (69 m)	$4,000,000
EF1	An outbuilding shed was destroyed. One of the metal doors at a loading bay was blown in and a large section of the warehouse roof was lifted, leading to partial collapse of the interior walls. A wood pallet skid was impaled into the side of the building. Two horizontal beams were twisted and detached from the warehouse, large sections of metal siding were removed, and insulation was recovered downstream. Trees were snapped and uprooted.							

== October ==
Confirmed tornadoes by Enhanced Fujita rating
EFU	EF0	EF1	EF2	EF3	EF4	EF5	Total
0	27	9	4	0	0	0	40

=== October 6 event ===
List of confirmed tornadoes – Tuesday, October 6, 2015
EF#	Location	County / Parish	State	Start Coord.	Time (UTC)	Path length	Max width	Damage (2015 USD)
EF0	Estrella	Maricopa	AZ	33.31°N 112.46°W	1934–1940	0.56 mi (0.90 km)	50 yd (46 m)	$0
EF0	A trained storm spotter reported a landspout tornado that caused no damage.							

=== October 7 event ===
List of confirmed tornadoes – Wednesday, October 7, 2015
EF#	Location	County / Parish	State	Start Coord.	Time (UTC)	Path length	Max width	Damage (2015 USD)
EF0	S of Separ	Grant	NM	32.14°N 108.42°W	1825–1830	1.7 mi (2.7 km)	10 yd (9.1 m)	$0
EF0	The public reported a landspout tornado that caused no damage.							

=== October 11 event ===
List of confirmed tornadoes – Sunday, October 11, 2015
EF#	Location	County / Parish	State	Start Coord.	Time (UTC)	Path length	Max width	Damage (2015 USD)
EF0	WNW of Terra Ceia	Manatee	FL	27.5904°N 82.6278°W	1349–1351	0.39 mi (0.63 km)	30 yd (27 m)	$12,000
EF0	A waterspout moved ashore the Sunshine Skyway Bridge, damaging a trailer.							

=== October 17 event ===
List of confirmed tornadoes – Saturday, October 17, 2015
EF#	Location	County / Parish	State	Start Coord.	Time (UTC)	Path length	Max width	Damage (2015 USD)
EF0	ESE of Sun City	Riverside	CA	33.6971°N 117.135°W	2140–2150	0.04 mi (0.064 km)	50 yd (46 m)	$0
EF0	Numerous reports of a landspout tornado over open terrain were relayed through broadcast media and social media.							

=== October 20 event ===
List of confirmed tornadoes – Tuesday, October 20, 2015
EF#	Location	County / Parish	State	Start Coord.	Time (UTC)	Path length	Max width	Damage (2015 USD)
EF0	WNW of Cornfields	Apache	AZ	35.65°N 109.77°W	2000–2005	6.93 mi (11.15 km)	10 yd (9.1 m)	$0
EF0	Law enforcement photographed a tornado that caused no damage.							

=== October 23 event ===
List of confirmed tornadoes – Friday, October 23, 2015
EF#	Location	County / Parish	State	Start Coord.	Time (UTC)	Path length	Max width	Damage (2015 USD)
EF0	SW of Hinton	Plymouth	IA	42.62°N 96.31°W	2110–2111	0.15 mi (0.24 km)	50 yd (46 m)	$1,000
EF0	Tree branches up to three inches in diameter were blown down by a brief tornado.							
EF0	W of Alton	Sioux	IA	42.98°N 96.02°W	2238–2239	0.23 mi (0.37 km)	50 yd (46 m)	$0
EF0	A brief tornado caused no reported damage.							
EF0	SW of Hospers	Sioux	IA	43.03°N 95.95°W	2249–2250	0.15 mi (0.24 km)	50 yd (46 m)	$0
EF0	A brief tornado caused no reported damage.							
EF0	NW of Hospers	Sioux	IA	43.08°N 95.89°W	2301–2302	0.23 mi (0.37 km)	50 yd (46 m)	$0
EF0	A brief tornado touched down in a field and caused little damage.							
EF0	SE of Sheldon	O'Brien	IA	43.153°N 95.84°W	2321–2322	0.17 mi (0.27 km)	50 yd (46 m)	$0
EF0	A brief tornado touched down in a field and caused little damage.							
EF0	NNW of Larrabee	Cherokee	IA	42.89°N 95.54°W	2339–2341	0.17 mi (0.27 km)	50 yd (46 m)	$10,000
EF0	A brief tornado tore most of a roof off of a house.							
EF0	W of Halbur	Carroll	IA	41.9885°N 95.0509°W	0018–0025	3.52 mi (5.66 km)	45 yd (41 m)	$5,000
EF0	Tornado left a track in several fields and damaged several small outbuildings.							

=== October 24 event ===
List of confirmed tornadoes – Saturday, October 24, 2015
EF#	Location	County / Parish	State	Start Coord.	Time (UTC)	Path length	Max width	Damage (2015 USD)
EF0	WNW of Pearland	Brazoria	TX	29.5963°N 95.3646°W	1414–1419	0.57 mi (0.92 km)	30 yd (27 m)	$20,000
EF0	The metal roof of a large building was damaged.							

=== October 25 event ===
List of confirmed tornadoes – Sunday, October 25, 2015
EF#	Location	County / Parish	State	Start Coord.	Time (UTC)	Path length	Max width	Damage (2015 USD)
EF0	Destrehan	St. Charles	LA	29.9603°N 90.3033°W	1525–1528	0.75 mi (1.21 km)	50 yd (46 m)	Unknown
EF0	A mobile home was shifted from its foundation, injuring an elderly woman. An apartment complex car port and trees sustained minor damage.							
EF0	WSW of Dulac	Terrebonne	LA	29.3405°N 90.8382°W	2150–2152	0.09 mi (0.14 km)	50 yd (46 m)	Unknown
EF0	A few homes sustained minor roof damage; sheet metal roofing panels were pulled from the roofs of storage buildings. Four medium-sized boats were overturned.							

=== October 30 event ===
List of confirmed tornadoes – Friday, October 30, 2015
EF#	Location	County / Parish	State	Start Coord.	Time (UTC)	Path length	Max width	Damage (2015 USD)
EF0	D'Hanis	Medina	TX	29.3261°N 99.288°W	0900–0905	2.78 mi (4.47 km)	100 yd (91 m)	$250,000
EF0	The second story of a frail building in the downtown area collapsed, and several other businesses and private residences also sustained damage. A few homes had roof and shingle damage and minor tree damage occurred on the southwest side of town.							
EF2	Floresville	Wilson	TX	29.127°N 98.155°W	1102–1111	5.26 mi (8.47 km)	440 yd (400 m)	$1,500,000
EF2	Strong tornado impacted Floresville, tossing vehicles and causing minor to major roof damage to many homes and businesses. Numerous campers and RVs at a dealership were destroyed, and one was lofted onto the roof of a three-story hotel. Floresville High School sustained partial roof collapse and collapse of two exterior walls. A large metal billboard was destroyed, and multiple trees and power lines were downed.							
EF1	SW of Willamar	Willacy	TX	26.3651°N 97.6718°W	1136–1138	0.65 mi (1.05 km)	25 yd (23 m)	$50,000
EF1	A webcam video shows that a barn was lifted up and destroyed, and trees were snapped and uprooted. Two outbuildings and seven power poles were also damaged, and a property owner's weather instrument measured an 86 mph wind gust as the tornado passed through.							
EF0	N of Willamar	Willacy	TX	26.4327°N 97.6116°W	1150–1153	1.61 mi (2.59 km)	25 yd (23 m)	$50,000
EF0	A child was injured by flying debris when the roof of a mobile home was lifted off. A cotton seed container was lifted up from its moorings and an aluminum door was peeled back from a storage building at a cotton processing plant. Several pine trees were also blown down.							
EF2	SSW of Geronimo to WSW of Zorn	Guadalupe	TX	29.624°N 97.982°W	1211–1230	8.3 mi (13.4 km)	440 yd (400 m)	Unknown
EF2	About 20 homes and mobile homes were damaged along the path, and five were destroyed. Damage to houses ranged from minor roof damage to complete removal of the roof. One mobile home was moved about 20 yards (18 metres), and another was rolled and completely destroyed. Garages, barns, trailers, and farm equipment were damaged or destroyed, and many trees were snapped, with a few uprooted. Two people were injured.							
EF1	WNW of Zorn	Guadalupe, Hays	TX	29.76°N 97.977°W	1228–1238	2.28 mi (3.67 km)	440 yd (400 m)	Unknown
EF1	Several homes had minor roof damage and large limbs were snapped, eleven electrical transmission poles were at least partially collapsed, and a garage attached to an apartment was completely collapsed. One person was injured.							

=== October 31 event ===
List of confirmed tornadoes – Saturday, October 31, 2015
EF#	Location	County / Parish	State	Start Coord.	Time (UTC)	Path length	Max width	Damage (2015 USD)
EF1	Jones Creek	Brazoria	TX	28.9653°N 95.444°W	0832–0835	1.2 mi (1.9 km)	40 yd (37 m)	$50,000
EF1	A mobile home was severely damaged, and several large trees were uprooted.							
EF0	Lake Jackson	Brazoria	TX	29.0434°N 95.4642°W	0904–0907	1 mi (1.6 km)	40 yd (37 m)	$50,000
EF0	Fences and several large trees were downed. Roof damage was inflicted to a Hobby Lobby and nearby mall.							
EF0	Liverpool	Brazoria	TX	29.2854°N 95.2801°W	0919–0921	0.92 mi (1.48 km)	40 yd (37 m)	$50,000
EF0	A cattle handling area, trees, and other structures were damaged.							
EF0	NNE of Angleton	Brazoria	TX	29.195°N 95.3791°W	0923–0930	3.69 mi (5.94 km)	50 yd (46 m)	$200,000
EF0	A farm house and barn were severely damaged, and three trailers were flipped over at an RV park.							
EF1	NW of Alvin	Brazoria	TX	29.4747°N 95.3129°W	1021–1022	0.21 mi (0.34 km)	40 yd (37 m)	$50,000
EF1	A mobile home was destroyed and several others were damaged.							
EF1	NNW of Alvin	Brazoria	TX	29.4716°N 95.2719°W	1021–1024	0.93 mi (1.50 km)	30 yd (27 m)	$200,000
EF1	A trailer was overturned while an additional 15 to 20 were damaged.							
EF0	SSE of Pasadena	Harris	TX	29.6015°N 95.1286°W	1022–1024	0.76 mi (1.22 km)	30 yd (27 m)	$75,000
EF0	A brief tornado damaged homes.							
EF2	Friendswood	Brazoria, Galveston	TX	29.5112°N 95.2346°W	1027–1036	5.54 mi (8.92 km)	50 yd (46 m)	$3,000,000
EF2	Numerous homes sustained roof damage, including one that had the entirety of its roof ripped off. Extensive tree damage was observed.							
EF0	W of Mont Belvieu	Harris	TX	29.8468°N 94.9556°W	1030–1032	0.21 mi (0.34 km)	50 yd (46 m)	$20,000
EF0	A home sustained minor roof damage, numerous trees were snapped, and two RV campers were rolled.							
EF2	Pasadena to La Porte	Harris	TX	29.6383°N 95.1126°W	1047–1055	4.76 mi (7.66 km)	150 yd (140 m)	$12,000,000
EF2	Tornado completely destroyed an industrial building and damaged multiple homes. Some of these homes sustained significant roof loss, one of which lost a portion of an exterior brick wall. Extensive damage to trees, fences, and power lines occurred along much of the path.							
EF1	WNW of Sugartown	Vernon	LA	30.8858°N 93.1155°W	1141–1145	2.07 mi (3.33 km)	140 yd (130 m)	$7,000
EF1	Several trees, large tree branches, and a utility pole were snapped. Two car canopies were damaged.							
EF0	Barrett	Harris	TX	29.8281°N 95.0771°W	1159–1203	3.3 mi (5.3 km)	50 yd (46 m)	$200,000
EF0	The roofs of several homes, trees, and utility poles were damaged.							
EF1	S of Hineston	Rapides	LA	31.0952°N 92.7595°W	1524–1534	7.03 mi (11.31 km)	550 yd (500 m)	$50,000
EF1	One house sustained roof damage while another was crushed by a fallen tree. Additional trees were damaged.							
EF1	ENE of Livingston	Livingston	LA	30.5032°N 90.6409°W	1822–1828	2.41 mi (3.88 km)	75 yd (69 m)	Unknown
EF1	A barn lost numerous roof panels, several undercarriage panels of a modular home were ripped off, and sheet metal panels were tossed 200–300 yd (180–270 m). A mobile home and a second modular home sustained minor roof damage, numerous trees were snapped or uprooted, and a large section of a wood fence was downed.							
EF1	SE of Kokomo	Marion	MS	31.1089°N 89.9135°W	2027–2032	1.61 mi (2.59 km)	200 yd (180 m)	$75,000
EF1	Several sheds were destroyed, several homes sustained roof damage, and numerous trees were snapped or uprooted.							
EF0	E of Columbia	Marion	MS	31.2642°N 89.7083°W	2046–2047	1.11 mi (1.79 km)	50 yd (46 m)	$5,000
EF0	A few trees were downed; tree limbs were snapped.							
EF0	E of Tickfaw	Tangipahoa	LA	30.57°N 90.41°W	2106–2116	4.81 mi (7.74 km)	50 yd (46 m)	Unknown
EF0	The undercarriage of a modular home sustained minor damage. Multiple metal sheds were destroyed, with metal tossed 100–150 yd (91–137 m). A large metal carport was ripped off, ripping a portion of a modular home off, with debris tossed up over 250 yd (230 m). Power lines were downed, trees were snapped or uprooted, and a trampoline was tossed 200–300 yd (180–270 m).							
EF0	SW of Hattiesburg	Lamar, Forrest	MS	31.2777°N 89.3597°W	2124–2129	4.53 mi (7.29 km)	100 yd (91 m)	$24,000
EF0	Several trees were snapped or uprooted. Some homes sustained minor damage from fallen trees or shingles ripped off the roof.							
EF0	SSE of Poplarville	Pearl River	MS	30.7044°N 89.4713°W	2142–2143	0.47 mi (0.76 km)	75 yd (69 m)	Unknown
EF0	One outbuilding was destroyed while another was damaged. A mobile home sustained damage, and trees limbs and wooden power poles were downed.							

== See also ==
- Tornadoes of 2015
- List of United States tornadoes from June to August 2015
- List of United States tornadoes from November to December 2015
