= Aurelius Southall Scott =

American journalist and political candidate

- Aurelius Southall Scott, from the 1930 yearbook of Bethune-Cookman College
- Born: January 26, 1901; Edwards, Mississippi
- Died: June 28, 1978 (aged 77)
- Occupations: Educator, editor, political candidate

Aurelius Southall Scott (January 26, 1901 – June 28, 1978) was an American educator and newspaper editor. Scott made national headlines in 1946, when he ran for public office in Georgia; he was arrested and institutionalized to force an end to his campaign.

== Early life ==
Aurelius Southall Scott was born in Edwards, Mississippi, one of the nine children of the Rev. William Alexander Scott and Emmeline Southall Scott. His father was clergyman and publisher; his mother was a teacher and a typesetter in her husband's publishing business. He attended Morehouse College, where he played football and was a member of the debate team, before graduating in 1925. He earned a master's degree at Ohio State University.

== Career ==
=== Education and publishing ===
Scott taught at Bethune-Cookman College and West Virginia State University. Scott's brother W. A. Scott Jr. founded the Atlanta Daily World newspaper in 1928; when W. A. Scott Jr. was killed in 1934, his brothers fought over the family's publishing business. Aurelius S. Scott was editor of the Birmingham World newspaper, until another brother, Cornelius A. Scott, fired him after a salary disagreement.

In 1961, Aurelius S. Scott founded the University of Love, an Atlanta-based institute.

=== Politics and institutionalization ===
In 1946, Scott ran for Fulton County coroner. Fearing that he might become the first black elected official in Georgia since Reconstruction, his white opponents and others (including his brother, editor Cornelius A. Scott) pressured him to withdraw as a candidate. When he refused to withdraw, his residency qualification was challenged, and he was arrested, possibly with his brother's cooperation. Aurelius Scott reacted violently to the arrest, and was institutionalized at a mental hospital in Nashville, Tennessee, effectively ending his campaign.

Scott's family, the NAACP, the National Urban League, and the American Civil Liberties Union all protested Scott's removal from the ballot and involuntary commitment. "He has done his people great harm," declared the editors of the Atlanta Journal-Constitution, "apparently out of a desire, by no means confined to the Negro race, for publicity, or notoriety." "Criticism should be aimed at the forces facing Scott rather than at him," commented the National Urban League's Lester B. Granger.

== Personal life ==
Scott married fellow professor Mazie O. Tyson in 1928; they ran a summer camp together in Ohio, and were on the faculty together at Bethune-Cookman College, before they separated in the 1930s. He married again in 1943, to Ruth Commons. Scott died in July 1978, aged 77 years.
