= Slim, Oklahoma =

Coordinates: 34°05′03″N 95°06′16″W

Location of Slim within the state of Oklahoma.

Slim was an unincorporated community in southwestern McCurtain County, Oklahoma, United States. The community is located six miles north of Valliant. The community is about one-half mile south of Pine Creek Lake and the community of Mound Grove is one mile east.

A post office operated in Slim from January 15, 1916 to July 31, 1933. During the years following Oklahoma's statehood, Slim's residents were economically more closely connected to communities in Pushmataha County, as the community lay near the Pushmataha County line.
