= Southern Christian Institute =

Former school in Hinds County, Mississippi, USA

Coordinates: 32°20′3.12″N 90°38′6.36″W

- U.S. National Register of Historic Places
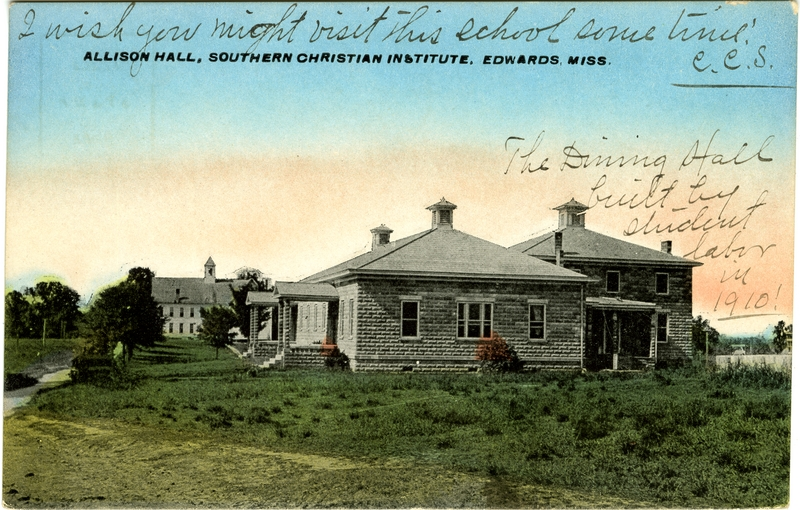

- Location within Mississippi Location within the United States
- Nearest city: Edwards, Mississippi
- Area: 53.6 acres (21.7 ha)
- Built: 1882
- Architectural style: Colonial Revival
- NRHP reference No.: 06001323
- Added to NRHP: January 30, 2007

Southern Christian Institute, was a boarding school for African American students, active from 1882 until 1953 in Edwards, Mississippi. In 1954 it merged with Tougaloo College. In 1971, the campus became the Bonner-Campbell School of Religion. It was added to the National Register of Historic Places in 2007.

== History ==
It was founded in 1882 after the Reconstruction-era by the Christian Church (Disciples of Christ) for the education of African Americans in the South after the American Civil War, and closed in 1953. Joel Baer Lehman served as president of the school from 1890 to 1933. The late Reverend Burnett Jacobs and his wife Willie Jacobs were long time administrators of Southern Christian Institute.

An all class reunion for Southern Christian Institute was held in 1979. A 1924/1925 Southern Christian Institute school catalogue is extant in the special collections department at Mississippi State University.

The school site has served various other purposes since the school closed. In 1954 it merged with Tougaloo College. Activist Bob Moses had hosted civil rights leadership training at this Tougaloo College campus. The school property was later purchased by the AME Church in 1971, and used as the Bonner-Campbell School of Religion mainly for church retreats.
