= Midway, Leake County, Mississippi =

Midway, Mississippi
- Unincorporated community
- Location within Mississippi Location within the United States
- Coordinates: 32°48′27″N 89°26′27″W
- Country: United States
- State: Mississippi
- County: Leake
- Elevation: 472 ft (144 m)
- Time zone: UTC-6 (Central (CST))
  - Summer (DST): UTC-5 (CDT)
- Area codes: 601 & 769
- GNIS feature ID: 692071

Midway is an unincorporated community in Leake County, Mississippi, United States.

== Geography ==
Midway is located on Midway Road 7.6 miles (12.2 km) northeast of Carthage.
