= Logan, Oklahoma =

Unincorporated community in Oklahoma, US

- Unincorporated community
- Location within Oklahoma
- Coordinates: 36°34′22″N 100°13′02″W
- Country: United States
- State: Oklahoma
- County: Beaver
- Elevation: 2,382 ft (726 m)
- Time zone: UTC-6 (Central (CST))
  - Summer (DST): UTC-5 (CDT)
- Area code: 580
- GNIS feature ID: 1100589

Logan is an unincorporated community in Beaver County, Oklahoma, United States. The community is 24 miles (39 km) southeast of Beaver.

== History ==
Logan is old enough that it appears on a 1911 Rand McNally map of the county. It had its own post office until that closed on June 8, 1996.
