= Highpoint, Mississippi =

- Unincorporated community
- Location within Mississippi Location within the United States
- Coordinates: 33°11′17″N 89°08′46″W
- Country: United States
- State: Mississippi
- County: Winston
- Elevation: 561 ft (171 m)
- Time zone: UTC-6 (Central (CST))
  - Summer (DST): UTC-5 (CDT)
- ZIP code: 39339
- Area code: 662
- GNIS feature ID: 693477

Highpoint is an unincorporated community located in Winston County, Mississippi. Highpoint is approximately 13 miles (21 km) southeast of Weir and approximately 9 miles (14 km) northwest of Louisville.
