= Edwards, Mississippi =

- Town
- Flag

- Location of Edwards, Mississippi

- Location in the United States
- Coordinates: 32°19′51″N 90°36′15″W
- Country: United States
- State: Mississippi
- County: Hinds

Area
  - Total: 1.66 sq mi (4.30 km^{2})
  - Land: 1.66 sq mi (4.30 km^{2})
  - Water: 0 sq mi (0.00 km^{2})
- Elevation: 236 ft (72 m)

Population (2020)
  - Total: 995
  - Density: 599.4/sq mi (231.42/km^{2})
- Time zone: UTC-6 (Central (CST))
  - Summer (DST): UTC-5 (CDT)
- ZIP code: 39066
- Area code: 601
- FIPS code: 28-21580
- GNIS feature ID: 0669683
- Website: townofedwards.com

Edwards is a town in Hinds County, Mississippi, United States. As of the 2020 census, Edwards had a population of 995. It is part of the Jackson Metropolitan Statistical Area.

== History ==
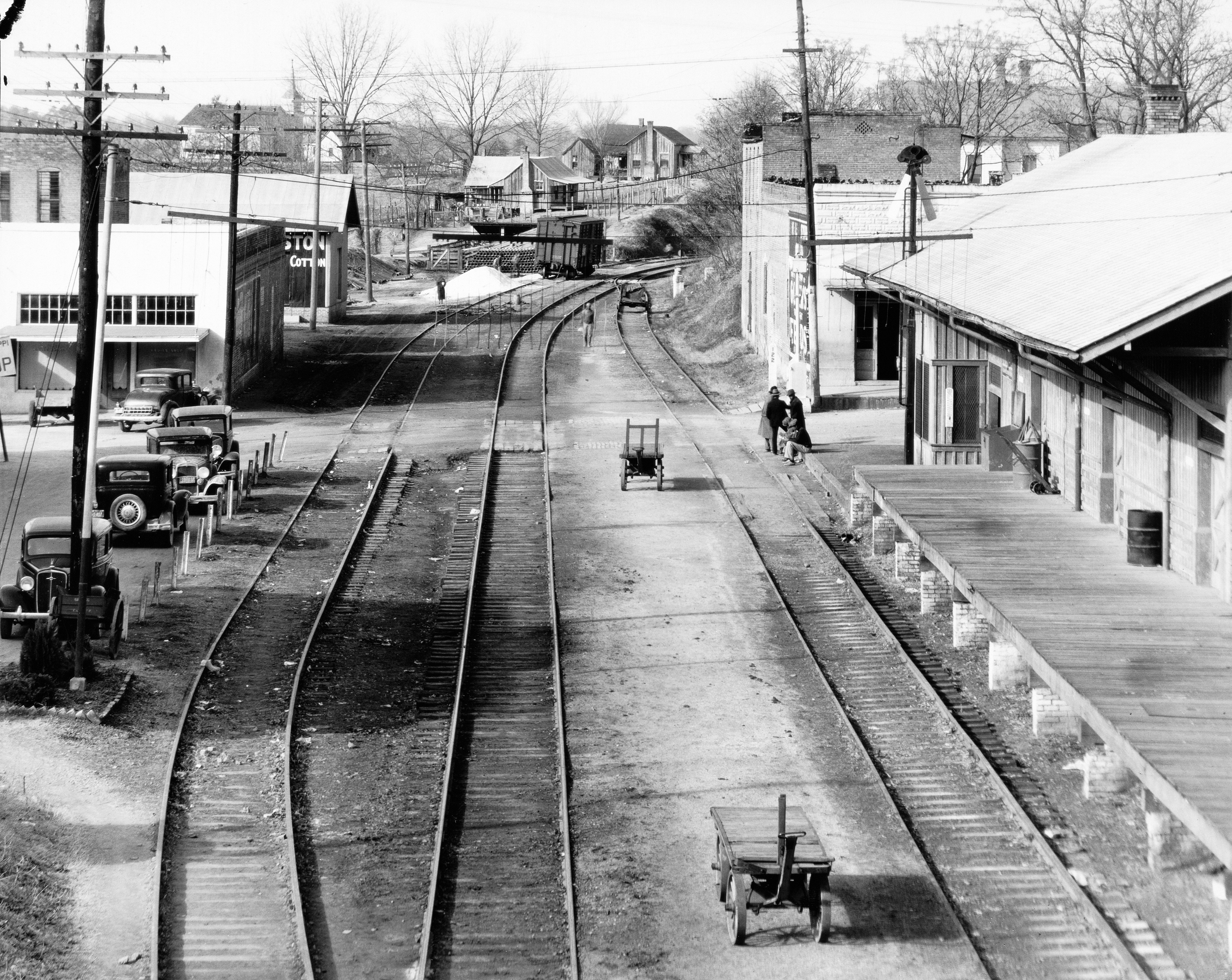
The railroad station in 1936

Edwards is named for Dick Edwards, owner and proprietor of the Edwards House in Jackson, Mississippi.

Edwards was originally named "Amsterdam" and settled in the 1830s. In 1832, it suffered from a cholera epidemic and was then bypassed by the Alabama and Vicksburg Railroad. This happened in 1839 when R. O. Edwards' plantation became a stop on the railroad known as Edwards Depot.

The depot was burned to prevent its use during the Civil War in 1863. The current site of Edwards was chosen in 1866 and was incorporated in 1871.

In 1882, the Southern Christian Institute was opened by the Christian Church (Disciples of Christ) in the town to educate African Americans. It later became Bonner-Campbell College. In 1897, Edwards suffered an attack of yellow fever that killed many residents of the town.

== Geography ==
Edwards is in western Hinds County, on high ground 1.5 miles (2.4 km) east of the Big Black River, which forms the Warren County line. Interstate 20 runs along the northern border of the town, with access from Exit 19. I-20 leads east 26 miles (42 km) to Jackson, the state capital, and west 17 miles (27 km) to Vicksburg.

According to the United States Census Bureau, the town of Edwards has a total area of 1.7 square miles (4.3 km^{2}), all land.

== Demographics ==
Historical population
Census	Pop.	Note	%±
1900	586		—
1910	589		0.5%
1920	727		23.4%
1930	456		−37.3%
1940	1,110		143.4%
1950	1,002		−9.7%
1960	1,206		20.4%
1970	1,236		2.5%
1980	1,515		22.6%
1990	1,279		−15.6%
2000	1,347		5.3%
2010	1,034		−23.2%
2020	995		−3.8%
U.S. Decennial Census

=== Racial and ethnic composition ===
Edwards town, Mississippi – Racial and ethnic composition Note: the US Census treats Hispanic/Latino as an ethnic category. This table excludes Latinos from the racial categories and assigns them to a separate category. Hispanics/Latinos may be of any race.
Race / Ethnicity (NH = Non-Hispanic)	Pop 2000	Pop 2010	Pop 2020	% 2000	% 2010	% 2020
White alone (NH)	272	159	109	20.19%	15.38%	10.95%
Black or African American alone (NH)	1,055	852	843	78.32%	82.40%	84.72%
Native American or Alaska Native alone (NH)	0	7	2	0.00%	0.68%	0.20%
Asian alone (NH)	2	1	1	0.15%	0.10%	0.10%
Native Hawaiian or Pacific Islander alone (NH)	0	0	0	0.00%	0.00%	0.00%
Other race alone (NH)	0	0	1	0.00%	0.00%	0.10%
Mixed race or Multiracial (NH)	5	6	19	0.37%	0.58%	1.91%
Hispanic or Latino (any race)	13	9	20	0.97%	0.87%	2.01%
Total	1,347	1,034	995	100.00%	100.00%	100.00%

=== 2020 census ===
As of the 2020 United States census, there were 995 people, 404 households, and 193 families residing in the town.

=== 2010 census ===
As of the 2010 United States census, there were 1,034 people living in the town. The racial makeup of the town was 82.4% Black, 15.4% White, 0.7% Native American, 0.1% Asian and 0.6% from two or more races. 0.9% were Hispanic or Latino of any race.

=== 2000 census ===
As of the census of 2000, there were 1,347 people, 461 households, and 335 families living in the town. The population density was 808.2 inhabitants per square mile (312.0/km^{2}). There were 505 housing units at an average density of 303.0 per square mile (117.0/km^{2}). The racial makeup of the town was 78.92% African American, 20.19% White, 0.15% Asian, 0.07% from other races, and 0.67% from two or more races. Hispanic or Latino of any race were 0.97% of the population.

There were 461 households, out of which 32.1% had children under the age of 18 living with them, 32.5% were married couples living together, 33.0% had a female householder with no husband present, and 27.3% were non-families. 23.0% of all households were made up of individuals, and 10.2% had someone living alone who was 65 years of age or older. The average household size was 2.90 and the average family size was 3.47.

In the town, the population was spread out, with 29.6% under the age of 18, 9.0% from 18 to 24, 27.8% from 25 to 44, 21.1% from 45 to 64, and 12.5% who were 65 years of age or older. The median age was 34 years. For every 100 females there were 82.3 males. For every 100 females age 18 and over, there were 75.6 males.

The median income for a household in the town was $29,231, and the median income for a family was $31,786. Males had a median income of $26,094 versus $19,500 for females. The per capita income for the town was $12,308. About 19.0% of families and 22.5% of the population were below the poverty line, including 32.4% of those under age 18 and 18.7% of those age 65 or over.

== Education ==
Edwards is served by the Hinds County School District and is zoned to Bolton/Edwards Elementary-Middle School in Bolton and Raymond High School in Raymond.

Jackson/Hinds Library System operates the Lois A. Flagg Library in Edwards, adjacent to the Edwards Head Start Center.

== Notable people ==
- Carnella Barnes, pioneering African American Christian Church (Disciples of Christ) minister
- Betty Currie, personal secretary of Bill Clinton, moved to Waukegan, Illinois as a child
- George Flaggs Jr., mayor of Vicksburg, Mississippi
- Johnny Fuller, blues and rock 'n' roll musician
- Otis Harris, track and field athlete who won gold and silver medals at the 2004 Summer Olympics
- George W. Lee, vice-president of the Regional Council of Negro Leadership
- Fiddlin' Joe Martin, blues musician
- Charlie Patton, blues musician and inductee in the Mississippi Musicians Hall of Fame
- Melvin Powell, Negro league baseball pitcher
- Aurelius Southall Scott, educator and newspaper editor
- Norman Francis Vandivier, aviator
