= Zama, Mississippi =

Zama
- Unincorporated community
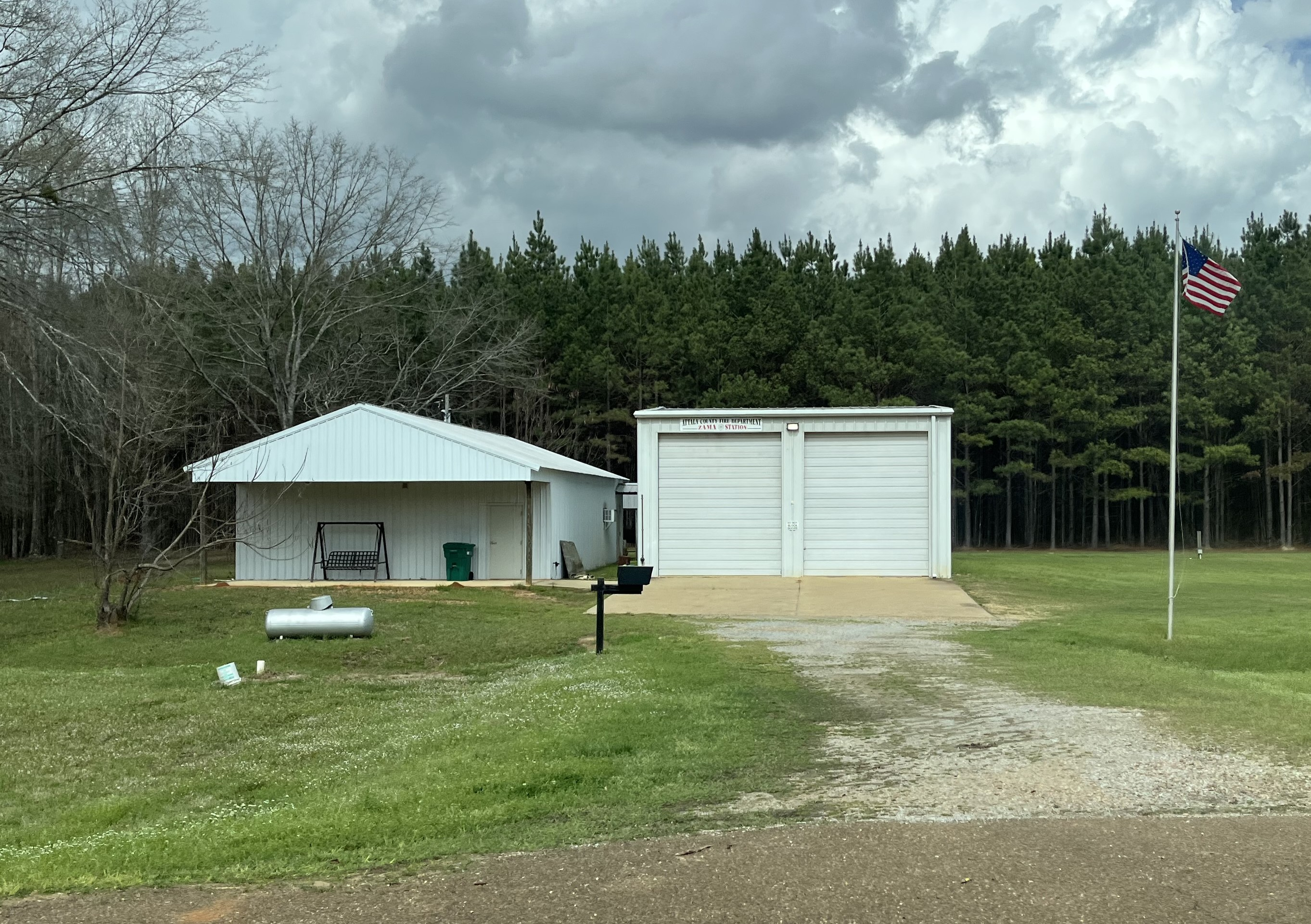
- Zama Fire Station

- Zama's position in Mississippi.
- Coordinates: 32°58′30″N 89°22′48″W
- Country: United States
- State: Mississippi
- County: Attala
- Elevation: 417 ft (127 m)
- Time zone: UTC-6 (Central (CST))
  - Summer (DST): UTC-5 (CDT)
- GNIS feature ID: 691172

Zama (also, Ayres) is an unincorporated community in Attala County, Mississippi, United States.

== History ==
A post office operated under the name Ayres from 1891 to 1908 and under the name Zama from 1918 to 1964.

Zama is named for a daughter of one of the community's founders. The first school building in Zama was constructed in 1907. The school was replaced in 1949 by a building designed by Edgar Lucian Malvaney. The community was once home to two hotels, a railroad depot, jail, bank, and multiple churches. The National Youth Administration assisted in constructing a vocational building and gymnasium in Zama in 1937 and 1938.

The W. P. Brown & Sons Lumber Company operated a band saw mill in Zama. The company maintained a railroad, the Kosciusko & Southeastern Railroad, which connected Zama to the Illinois Central Railroad in Kosciusko. The mill closed in 1931.

On April 27, 2011, a tornado hit the Zama area as part of the 2011 Super Outbreak, causing heavy tree and power line damage. The tornado was rated EF1, with estimated wind speeds of 95 mph (153 km/h; 83 kn). The tornado destroyed a barn in its path of destruction of 50 yards (46 m) wide as it travelled a path of 1 mile (1.6 km).
