= Hollinger, Nebraska =

Unincorporated community in Nebraska, U.S.

Coordinates: 40°09′33″N 99°42′28″W

Hollinger is an unincorporated community in Furnas County, Nebraska, United States.

== History ==
Hollinger was named by the railroad. A post office was established in Hollinger in 1905, and remained in operation until it was discontinued in 1944.
