= Rooster Morris =

American writer

Rooster Morris (born September 16, 1955) is an American writer, musician and songwriter, the author of the Axle Galench children's book series and co-owner of Axle Publishing Company, Inc. and Laid-Back West, an educational materials distribution company. The first book in his series, Axle Galench and the Gate of No Return, was published in 2004. Morris released his second book, Axle Galench in Search of Barnsfoggon, in 2005, and has also recorded and performed the music for audio books for each release. Axle Galench and the Spin Lizard Rescue is currently in its final stages of editing and will be published sometime in 2008. Since 2004, Morris and his wife/business partner Jody Logsdon have sold a combined total of over 13,500 of his books and audio books in his self-publishing endeavors. He has performed for over 2.5 million children since the publication of his first book. He was featured in the Texas Living section of Southern Living Magazine in January 2007. Morris currently resides in Rockdale, Texas.

== Personal life ==
David Lee Morris was born in Ridgecrest, California, and soon acquired the nickname Rooster. He spent his childhood immersed in the cowboy life. At the age of five, he began riding horses and working cattle with his father on ranches in the tri-state area of Texas, New Mexico and Oklahoma. Because he lived in remote places and had few friends his own age, Rooster invented a unique way of entertaining himself. He started mimicking bird calls and coyote howls, then began developing unusual voices. Many years later, the skills he taught himself would result in the recording of an audio book written by John R. Erickson, the author of the Hank the Cowdog books. Moonshiner's Gold contained seventeen people for which Morris did different voice characterizations.

== Musical background ==
Rooster's musical skills are self-taught as well. He began learning to play the fiddle when he was a teenager. By the time he graduated from high school, he was playing fiddle for the historic Western Cowpunchers Association that was established in the 1880s in Amarillo, Texas. He has since been recorded by the Smithsonian Institution playing old-time fiddle music (album title, Ridin' Old Paint), recorded a CD of his original compositions (Picnic Tree), and taught himself how to play guitar, mandolin, and bass.

== Becoming a writer ==
In 1999, Morris opened for children's author John R. Erickson during a public event in Lubbock, Texas. The response of the audience to Erickson's reading moved Morris to become acquainted with the Hank the Cowdog series. He spoke with Erickson, who encouraged him to learn some of the songs and voices so he could do Hank the Cowdog programs in schools. Morris soon learned the songs and voices from Erickson's audio books and, in a business agreement with Erickson, Morris began performing solo Hank the Cowdog shows, ultimately reaching over two million people over the next three years. The enthusiasm of the children to the performances, as well as the positive influence Morris could see the performances were having on their reading, convinced him to begin writing his own books. His school and community performances now highlight his own Axle Galench books, and include music, storytelling, and writing workshop components.

== Publications ==
=== Books ===
- Axle Galench and the Gate of No Return (2004)
- Axle Galench in Search of Barnsfoggon (2005)
- Axle Galench and the Spin Lizard Rescue (2012-Not Yet Released)

=== Audiobooks ===
- Hank the Cowdog audio books 36, 37, 38, 40, 41, 42, 43, 44, 45 by John R. Erickson, recorded in Amarillo, Texas; fiddle, guitar, and vocal harmonies by Rooster Morris (2000–2005)
- Moonshiner's Gold audio book by John R. Erickson, recorded in Amarillo, Texas; all voice work and background fiddle by Rooster Morris (2001)
- Axle Galench and the Gate of No Return audio book and music CD by Rooster Morris, recorded in Perryton, Texas; all voice work, vocals, fiddle, rhythm guitar, keyboard, bass, electric guitar, and percussion by Rooster Morris; produced by Morris (2004)
- Axle Galench in Search of Barnsfoggon audio book and music CD by Rooster Morris, recorded in Perryton, Texas; all voice work, vocals, fiddle, rhythm guitar, keyboard, bass, electric guitar, and percussion by Rooster Morris; produced by Morris (2005)

=== Other recordings ===
- Ol' Shep by Enid Morris, Recorded in Amarillo, Texas; background fiddle by Rooster Morris (1993)
- Buffalo Hunter for Buffalo Bill Museum, Cody, Wyoming; recorded in Amarillo, Texas; fiddle accompaniment by Rooster Morris (1995)
- Live Recordings, Nara Visa, NM, for Santa Fe Folk Music State Archives; vocal and fiddle accompaniment by Rooster Morris (1996, 1997)
- Picnic Tree, lyrics, guitar & fiddle by Rooster Morris (1998)
- Live Recordings, Elko, NV; recorded live for the Western Heritage Center; fiddle accompaniment by Rooster Morris for Buck Ramsey, Rich O'Brian & Native American, Hank Real Bird (1996, 1997, 1998)
- The Medicine Keepers by J. B. Allen, recorded in Lubbock, Texas; fiddle accompaniment by Rooster Morris (1999)
- Ridin' Old Paint – Documenting the Canadian River Fiddle Tradition, recorded at Boys Ranch, Texas, by the Smithsonian Institution; vocals and lead fiddle by Rooster Morris (1999)
