= Waka, Texas =

- unincorporated community
- Location within the state of Texas Waka, Texas (the United States)
- Coordinates: 36°16′54″N 101°02′39″W
- Country: United States
- State: Texas
- County: Ochiltree
- Elevation: 3,041 ft (927 m)
- Time zone: UTC-6 (Central (CST))
  - Summer (DST): UTC-5 (CDT)
- ZIP codes: 79093
- Area code: 806
- GNIS feature ID: 2805825

Waka is an unincorporated community in western Ochiltree County, Texas, United States. It lies along State Highway 15 southwest of the city of Perryton, the county seat of Ochiltree County. Its elevation is 3,045 feet (928 m). Although Waka is unincorporated, it has a post office, with the ZIP code of 79093. As of the 2020 census, Waka had a population of 50.

== History ==
The community, initially named Wawaka, was founded by German settlers in 1885, and its post office was opened in 1901. When another community, Burnside, was platted along the Panhandle and Santa Fe Railway 3 miles (5 km) away, Wawaka's residents and its postmaster moved to Burnside; the community was renamed Waka in 1921, two years after the Wawaka residents moved, but the post office remained "Wawaka" for six years.

In 2014, it was announced that, by March 29, the Post Office in Waka would close. Residents were encouraged to use the postal services in Farnsworth or in Perryton.

== Geography ==
=== Climate ===
According to the Köppen Climate Classification system, Waka has a semi-arid climate, abbreviated "BSk" on climate maps.

== Education ==
It is within the Perryton Independent School District, which operates Perryton High School.

On September 9, 1990, the Perryton district absorbed the Waka Independent School District.

== Demographics ==
Historical population
Census	Pop.	Note	%±
2020	50		—
U.S. Decennial Census; 1850–1900 1910; 1920 1930 1940; 1950 1960 1970; 1980 1990 2000; 2010 2020

Waka first appeared as a census designated place in the 2020 U.S. census.

=== 2020 census ===
Waka CDP, Texas – Racial and ethnic composition Note: the US Census treats Hispanic/Latino as an ethnic category. This table excludes Latinos from the racial categories and assigns them to a separate category. Hispanics/Latinos may be of any race.
Race / Ethnicity (NH = Non-Hispanic)	Pop 2020	% 2020
White alone (NH)	35	70.00%
Black or African American alone (NH)	0	0.00%
Native American or Alaska Native alone (NH)	0	0.00%
Asian alone (NH)	0	0.00%
Native Hawaiian or Pacific Islander alone (NH)	0	0.00%
Other race alone (NH)	0	0.00%
Mixed race or Multiracial (NH)	2	4.00%
Hispanic or Latino (any race)	13	26.00%
Total	50	100.00%
