= Perryton High School =

Location
- 1200 S Jefferson St. Perryton, Texas 79070-1048; United States
- Coordinates: 36.38804°N 100.81628°W

Information
- School type: Public High School
- School district: Perryton Independent School District
- Principal: Tori Little
- Teaching staff: 50.08 (FTE)
- Grades: 9-12
- Enrollment: 549 (2024-2025)
- Student to teacher ratio: 10.96
- Colors: Red & White
- Athletics conference: UIL Class AAAA
- Mascot: Ranger
- Website: Perryton High School

Perryton High School is a public high school located in Perryton, Texas (USA) and classified as a 4A school by the UIL. It is part of the Perryton Independent School District located in north central Ochiltree County. In 2011, the school was rated "Met Standard" by the Texas Education Agency.

The school district, and therefore the high school, also serves Farnsworth and Waka.

== Athletics ==
The Perryton Rangers compete in the following sports:

- Cross Country
- Volleyball
- Football
- Basketball
- Powerlifting
- Golf
- Tennis
- Track
- Softball
- Baseball
- Soccer
- Marching Band

=== State titles ===
- Girls Cross Country
  - 1988(3A)
- Boys Golf
  - 2002(3A)
- Powerlifting
  - 2022 (4A)
- Girl's Powerlifting
  - 2021 (4A)

== Notable alumni ==
- Rolando Andaya Jr, Filipino lawyer and politician
- Caleb Campbell, American NFL football player
- Jeremy Campbell, American Track and Field Paralympic Athlete
- Janet Becerril - IPF Powerlifting - 2016 & 2017 - 2 time National Champion, 2 time World Champion - World Record holder for the bench press(83 kg) and total(348 kg) for the sub junior 43 kg weight class
- Josue Becerril - USA Powerlifting - 2019 - National Champion for the sub junior 74 kg weight class
- Mike Hargrove, American MLB baseball player and coach
- Clyde Flowers, American football player
- Keith Flowers, American football player
- Saleen Nyman - IPF Powerlifting - 2022 - National Champion, World Champion for the sub junior 43 kg weight class
- Alejandra Salas - IPF Powerlifting - 2022 - National Champion, World Champion for the sub junior 84 kg weight class
- Christian Laja - IPF Powerlifting - 2022 - National Champion, World Champion for the sub junior 83 kg weight clas
