= Clyde Flowers =

American football player (1921–2000)

Profile
- Position: Guard

Personal information
- Born: October 16, 1921; Perryton, Texas, U.S.
- Died: August 15, 2000 (age 78); Houston, Texas, U.S.

Career information
- High school: Perryton High School
- College: Texas Christian University

Career history
- 1942–1944: TCU

Awards and highlights
- First-team All-American (1944); 2× First-team All-SWC (1943, 1944)

Clyde Eugene Flowers (October 6, 1921 – August 15, 2000) was an American football player.

Flowers was born in Perryton, Texas, in 1921. He attended Texas Christian University (TCU) where he played at the guard position for the TCU Horned Frogs football team from 1942 to 1944. He was selected as captain of the 1943 and 1944 teams. He was selected by the Newspaper Enterprise Association (NEA) as a first-team player on the 1944 All-America college football team. He was drafted by the New York Giants in the 3rd round of the 1944 NFL draft (21st overall) while he still had a year of eligibility, but even after graduating, he never played in the NFL and chose to go into coaching instead.

Flowers was an assistant football coach at Plainview High School in 1945 and 1946. He then served as TCU's line coach from 1947 to 1949. He resigned his coaching position to enter business in Fort Worth.

Flowers was inducted into the TCU Hall of Fame in 1977 and died in 2000 at age 78 in Houston, Texas.
