= Ryan Culwell =

American musician

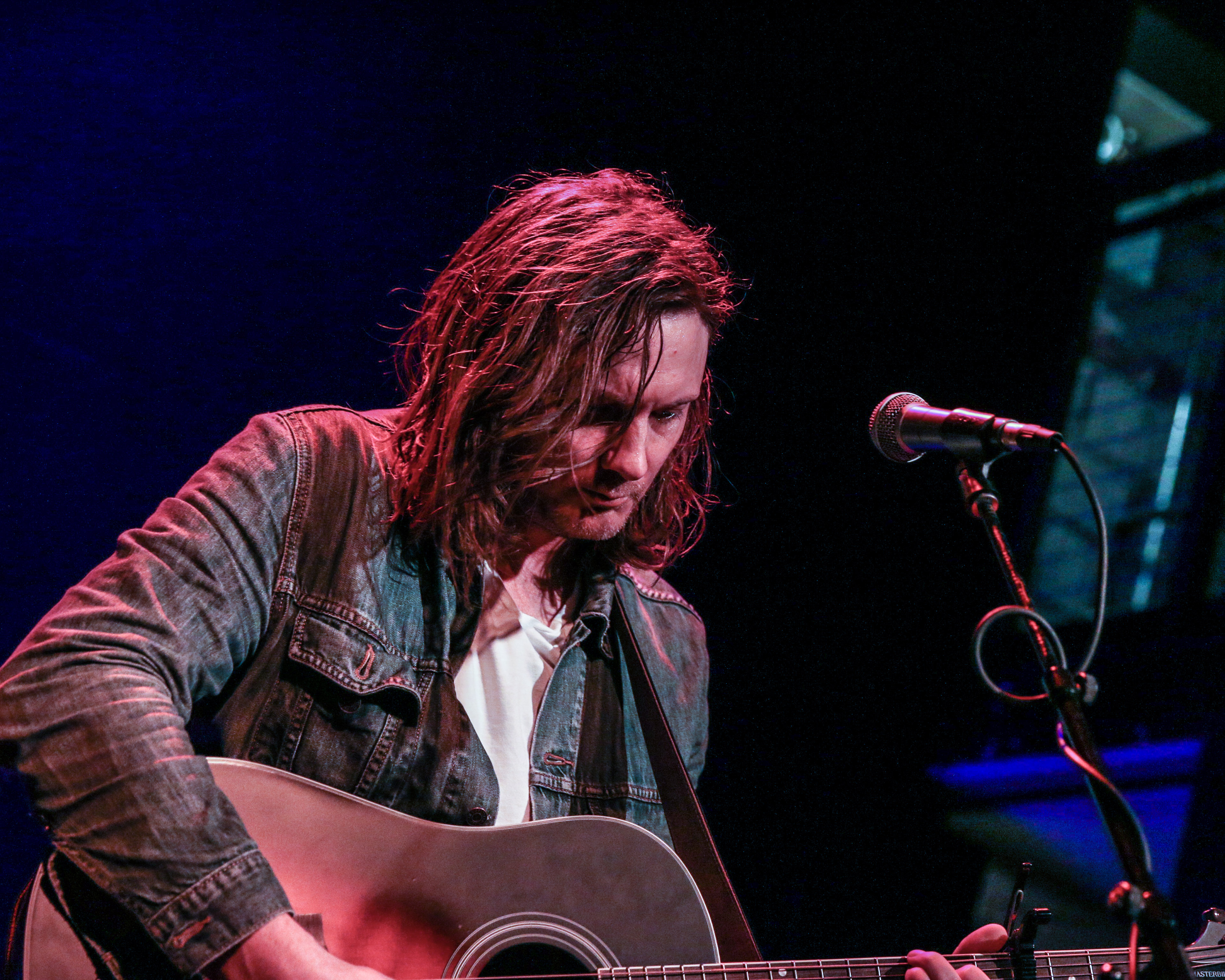
- Ryan Culwell at Rough Trade in Brooklyn, NY on April 24, 2018

Background information
- Born: April 25, 1980 (age 46); Perryton, Texas
- Genres: Americana, Country, Folk, Heartland rock
- Instruments: Vocals, Guitar
- Website: ryanculwell.com

Ryan Culwell is an American singer, songwriter, and guitarist based in Nashville, Tennessee. His third full-length album The Last American was released by Missing Piece Records on August 24, 2018.

== Biography ==
Growing up in the Texas Panhandle, Culwell's family labored in oilfields and the trucking industry. Hoping for a different life, Culwell went to college to study economics, but eventually left to pursue his musical career while working odd jobs on the side. Through the years Culwell has worked as a roofing salesman, landscaper, tree cutter, and pedal tavern driver. In 2006 he released his debut Heroes on the Radio, and in 2015 he released his second album Flatlands.

Culwell's music has been compared to that of Bruce Springsteen, Steve Earle, and The War on Drugs, and he's played shows with Patty Griffin, Hayes Carll, Ashley Monroe, Billy Joe Shaver, and Amy Speace.

== Discography ==
- Heroes on the Radio (2006)
- Flatlands (2015)
- The Last American (2018)
- Run Like A Bull (2022)
