= Keith Flowers =

American football player (1930–1993)

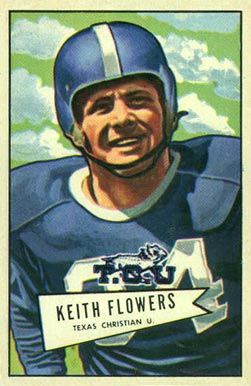
- Flowers on a 1952 Bowman football card

No. 50, 64
- Positions: Center, linebacker

Personal information
- Born: April 24, 1930; Perryton, Texas, U.S.
- Died: November 12, 1993 (aged 63); Plano, Texas, U.S.
- Listed height: 6 ft 0 in (1.83 m)
- Listed weight: 211 lb (96 kg)

Career information
- High school: Perryton
- College: TCU (1948–1951)
- NFL draft: 1952: 11th round, 130th overall pick

Career history
- Detroit Lions (1952); Dallas Texans (1952); Baltimore Colts (1953)*
- * Offseason or practice squad member only

Awards and highlights
- First-team All-American (1951); First-team All-SWC (1951)

Career NFL statistics
- Games played: 9
- Games started: 6
- Interceptions: 1
- Stats at Pro Football Reference

Keith Duane Flowers (April 24, 1930 – November 12, 1993) was an American professional football player who played one season in the National Football League (NFL) with the Detroit Lions and Dallas Texans. He was selected by the Lions in the eleventh round of the 1952 NFL draft after playing college football at Texas Christian University.

== Early life and college ==
Keith Duane Flowers was born on April 24, 1930, in Perryton, Texas. He attended Perryton High School in Perryton.

Flowers was a member of the TCU Horned Frogs of Texas Christian University from 1948 to 1951 and a three-year letterman from 1949 to 1951. As a senior in 1951, he was named a first-team All-American defensive center by both the Associated Press (AP) and Chicago Tribune. He was also named first-team All-Southwest Conference at linebacker by the AP in 1951.

== Professional career ==
Flowers was selected by the Detroit Lions in the 11th round, with the 130th overall pick, of the 1952 NFL draft. He played in three games for the Lions during the 1952 season before being released on October 23, 1952.

Flowers signed with the Dallas Texans of the NFL on November 5, 1952. He appeared in six games, starting three, for the Texans in 1952, converting three of five extra points and intercepting one pass for 16 yards. The Texans folded after the 1952 season and the team's assets were awarded to the Baltimore Colts. Flowers was released by the Colts in 1953.

== Personal life ==
Flowers died on November 12, 1993, in Plano, Texas.
