= Farnsworth, Texas =

- Unincorporated community
- Location within the state of Texas Farnsworth, Texas (the United States)
- Coordinates: 36°19′16″N 100°57′59″W
- Country: United States
- State: Texas
- County: Ochiltree

Area
  - Total: 1.34 sq mi (3.48 km^{2})
- Elevation: 2,992 ft (912 m)

Population (2020)
  - Total: 95
  - Density: 71/sq mi (27/km^{2})
- Time zone: UTC-6 (Central (CST))
  - Summer (DST): UTC-5 (CDT)
- ZIP codes: 79033
- GNIS feature ID: 2805824

Farnsworth is a census designated place in western Ochiltree County, Texas, United States. It lies at the intersection of State Highway 15 with FM376, southwest of the city of Perryton, the county seat of Ochiltree County. Its elevation is 2,995 feet (913 m). Although Farnsworth is unincorporated, it has a post office with the ZIP code of 79033. As of the 2020 census, Farnsworth had a population of 95.

== History ==
Founded in 1919 along the Panhandle and Santa Fe Railway, Farnsworth was not the first community in the area: the coming of ranchers in the 1880s had led to the establishment of a nearby community named Olds. The locality changed names several times: starting at Olds, it became Nogal with the establishment of a post office in 1905, changed to Rogerstown in 1906, and finally concluded in 1920 with the opening of a post office at the current site. From the beginning, the community has borne the name of Farnsworth, given in honor of Panhandle and Santa Fe Railway director H. W. Farnsworth.

== Climate ==
According to the Köppen Climate Classification system, Farnsworth has a semi-arid climate, abbreviated "BSk" on climate maps.

== Demographics ==
Historical population
Census	Pop.	Note	%±
2020	95		—
U.S. Decennial Census; 1850–1900 1910; 1920 1930 1940; 1950 1960 1970; 1980 1990 2000; 2010 2020

Farnsworth first appeared as a census designated place in the 2020 U.S. census.

=== 2020 census ===
Farnsworth CDP, Texas – Racial and ethnic composition Note: the US Census treats Hispanic/Latino as an ethnic category. This table excludes Latinos from the racial categories and assigns them to a separate category. Hispanics/Latinos may be of any race.
Race / Ethnicity (NH = Non-Hispanic)	Pop 2020	% 2020
White alone (NH)	61	64.21%
Black or African American alone (NH)	0	0.00%
Native American or Alaska Native alone (NH)	0	0.00%
Asian alone (NH)	0	0.00%
Native Hawaiian or Pacific Islander alone (NH)	0	0.00%
Other race alone (NH)	0	0.00%
Mixed race or Multiracial (NH)	9	9.47%
Hispanic or Latino (any race)	25	26.32%
Total	95	100.00%

== Education ==
Farnsworth is within the Perryton Independent School District, which includes Perryton High School.
