= Perryton Independent School District =

School district in Texas

Perryton Independent School District is a public school district based in Perryton, Texas (USA). It also serves Farnsworth and Waka.

In 2022, the school district was rated an "A District" by the Texas Education Agency.

== History ==
On September 9, 1990, the district absorbed the Waka Independent School District.

From 1999 to 2022, the district has maintained an enrollment of between 1,984 and 2,433 students per year, peaking in the 2013-2014 school year.

== Schools ==
- Perryton High School (Grades 9-12)
- Perryton Junior High (Grades 6-8)
- Edwin F. Williams Intermediate (Grades 4-5)
- James L. Wright Elementary (Grades 1-3)
  - 2004 National Blue Ribbon School
- Perryton Kinder (Grades PK-K)
