= John R. Erickson =

American author (born 1943)

John Richard Erickson
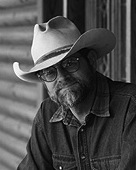
- Born: October 20, 1943 (age 82); Midland, Texas, US
- Education: Perryton High School; University of Denver; University of Texas; Harvard Divinity School
- Occupation: Western writer: Hank the Cowdog series
- Spouse: Kristine Dykema Erickson (married c. 1967)
- Children: 3

John Richard Erickson (born October 20, 1943) is an American cowboy and author, best known for his Hank the Cowdog series of children's novels.

== Early life and education ==
John Richard Erickson was born in Midland, Texas on October 20, 1943. His parents were Joseph W. Erickson and Anna Beth Curry Erickson. In 1946 the family moved to Perryton in the Texas Panhandle. Erickson attended school in Perryton and upon graduation studied at the University of Denver for a year. He then attended the University of Texas, where he met his future wife Kristine. They were married in 1967. Erickson later went to Harvard Divinity School but walked away a few credits short of graduating.

== Career ==
After leaving Harvard, Erickson began working as a cowboy and ranch manager on various ranches in Texas and Oklahoma. He began publishing short stories in 1967, while still working as a cowboy and ranch manager.

In 1982, after receiving numerous rejection slips from large publishers, Erickson borrowed $2,000 and began his own publishing company, Maverick Books. Hank the Cowdog debuted in The Cattleman magazine, and two related short stories appeared in the first book published by Maverick Books, The Devil in Texas. Erickson began selling books out of his pickup truck wherever cowboys gathered.

Erickson soon found himself receiving letters addressed to Hank, and so, the next year, in 1983, he published the first full-length book in the series, The Original Adventures of Hank the Cowdog. His 2,000-book first printing ran out in six weeks. With the book's success, he shortly afterward recorded the book, word-for-word, on audio tape. Hank the Cowdog has since become the longest-running successful children's series on audio. Hank and Drover, characters in his books, are both dogs he'd worked with at the ranch. In the books, Hank is "Head of Ranch Security" of an unnamed ranch in Ochiltree County.

That book has since spawned over eighty sequels, becoming one of the most popular children's fiction series, selling more than 7.5 million books and winning several awards. The full series of books and tapes are usually available in most school libraries around the United States. His books are endorsed by the Texas Library Association and have, for two years, been serialized in The Dallas Morning News. His "Hank the Cowdog" series has been translated into Persian, Spanish, Danish, and Chinese, and have sold over 8.5 million copies.

Erickson has written over seventy books, and is frequently invited to perform, reading book selections and singing songs, in classrooms and school libraries.

After years of shifting publishers, retail rights to all 40 Hank the Cowdog audiobooks returned to Maverick Books in 2002. That year Maverick relaunched the series on cassette and CD, with plans to release new audiobooks in tandem with Puffin's print editions, reaffirming the stability of Erickson's family-run publishing venture.

== Personal life ==
On March 6, 2017, Erickson's ranch home was destroyed in the fires that swept across more than 315,000 acres of the Texas Panhandle. Upon his loss from the blaze, he quoted Scripture: "Naked we came into this world and naked we will leave it," and added, "but we will sure miss that house." His property is south of Perryton in Roberts County.

Erickson is married to Kristine Dykema Erickson, and together they have three children.

== Bibliography ==
As of June 2026, there are 84 printed books in the Hank the Cowdog series, 7 audio-only titles, and 6 CDs of music from the audiobooks. Erickson has also written a number of non-Hank books.

- Through Time and the Valley (1978). Shoal Creek Publishers, Maverick Books, and University of North Texas Press.
- Panhandle Cowboy (1980). With a preface by Larry McMurtry. University of Nebraska Press and University of North Texas Press.
- The Modern Cowboy (1981). University of Nebraska Press and University of North Texas Press.
- The Devil in Texas and Other Cowboy Tales (1982). Maverick Books and Gulf Publishing Company.
- Cowboys Are Partly Human (1983). Maverick Books and Gulf Publishing Company.
- Alkali County Tales (1984). Maverick Books and Gulf Publishing Company.
- The Hunter (1984). Doubleday and Company.
- Ace Reid: Cowpoke (1984). Maverick Books.
- Essays on Writing and Publishing (1985). Maverick Books.
- Cowboys Are Old Enough To Know Better (1986). Maverick Books and Gulf Publishing Company.
- Cowboys Are a Separate Species (1986). Maverick Books and Gulf Publishing Company.
- Cowboy Country (1986). Maverick Books.
- Cowboy Fiddler (1992). With Frankie McWhorter. Texas Tech Press and University of North Texas Press.
- Horse Fixin’: Forty Years of Working With Problem Horses (1992). With Frankie McWhorter. Texas Tech Press
- Catch Rope—The Long Arm of the Cowboy (1994). University of North Texas Press.
- LZ Cowboy: A Cowboy’s Journal 1979-81 (1999). University of North Texas Press.
- Some Babies Grow Up To Be Cowboys: A Collection of Articles and Essays (1999). University of North Texas Press.
- Friends: Cowboys, Cattle, Horses, Dogs, Cats, and Coons (2002). University of North Texas Press.
- Prairie Gothic: The Story of a West Texas Family (2005). Foreword by Elmer Kelton. University of North Texas Press.
- Moonshiner’s Gold (2001). Viking-Penguin and Maverick Books.
- Discovery At Flint Springs (2003). Viking Press and Maverick Books.
- Story Craft: Reflections on Faith, Culture, and Writing (2009). Introduction by Gene Edward Veith and foreword by Nancy Pearcey. Maverick Books.
- Fear’s Return (2011). Maverick Books.
- Ranch Life Series, Book One: Ranching and Livestock (2016). Maverick Books.
- Bad Smoke, Good Smoke: A Texas Rancher's View of Wildfire (2021). Texas Tech University Press.
- Small Town Author (2025). Texas Tech University Press.
