= Ochiltree County, Texas =

County in Texas, United States

- County
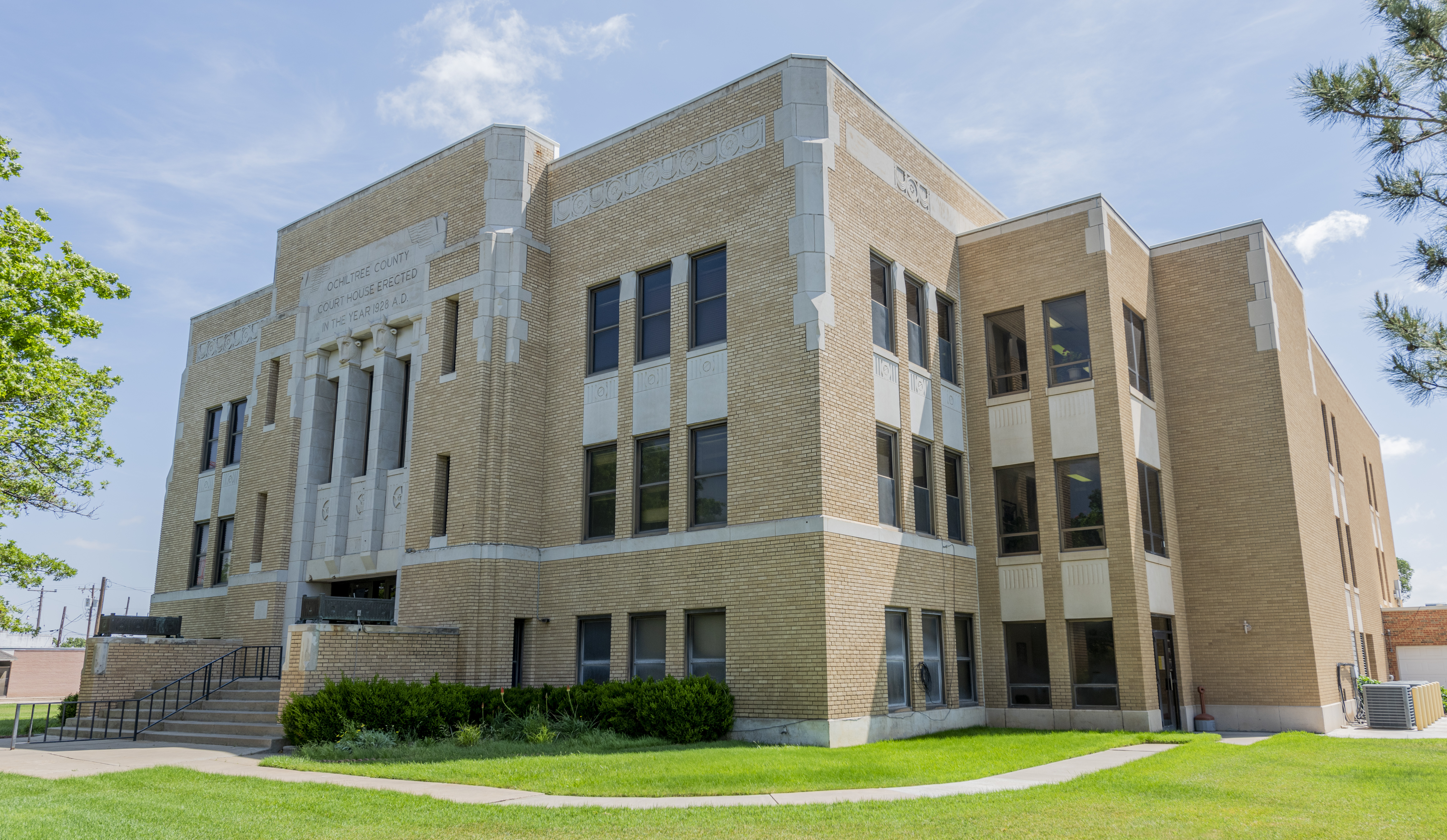
- 1928 Ochiltree County Courthouse in Perryton

- Location within the U.S. state of Texas
- Coordinates: 36°17′N 100°49′W
- Country: United States
- State: Texas
- Founded: 1889
- Named for: W. B. Ochiltree
- Seat: Perryton
- Largest city: Perryton

Area
  - Total: 918 sq mi (2,380 km^{2})
  - Land: 918 sq mi (2,380 km^{2})
  - Water: 0.5 sq mi (1.3 km^{2}) 0.06%

Population (2020)
  - Total: 10,015
  - Estimate (2025): 9,284 ▼
  - Density: 10.9/sq mi (4.21/km^{2})
- Time zone: UTC−6 (Central)
  - Summer (DST): UTC−5 (CDT)
- Congressional district: 13th
- Website: www.co.ochiltree.tx.us

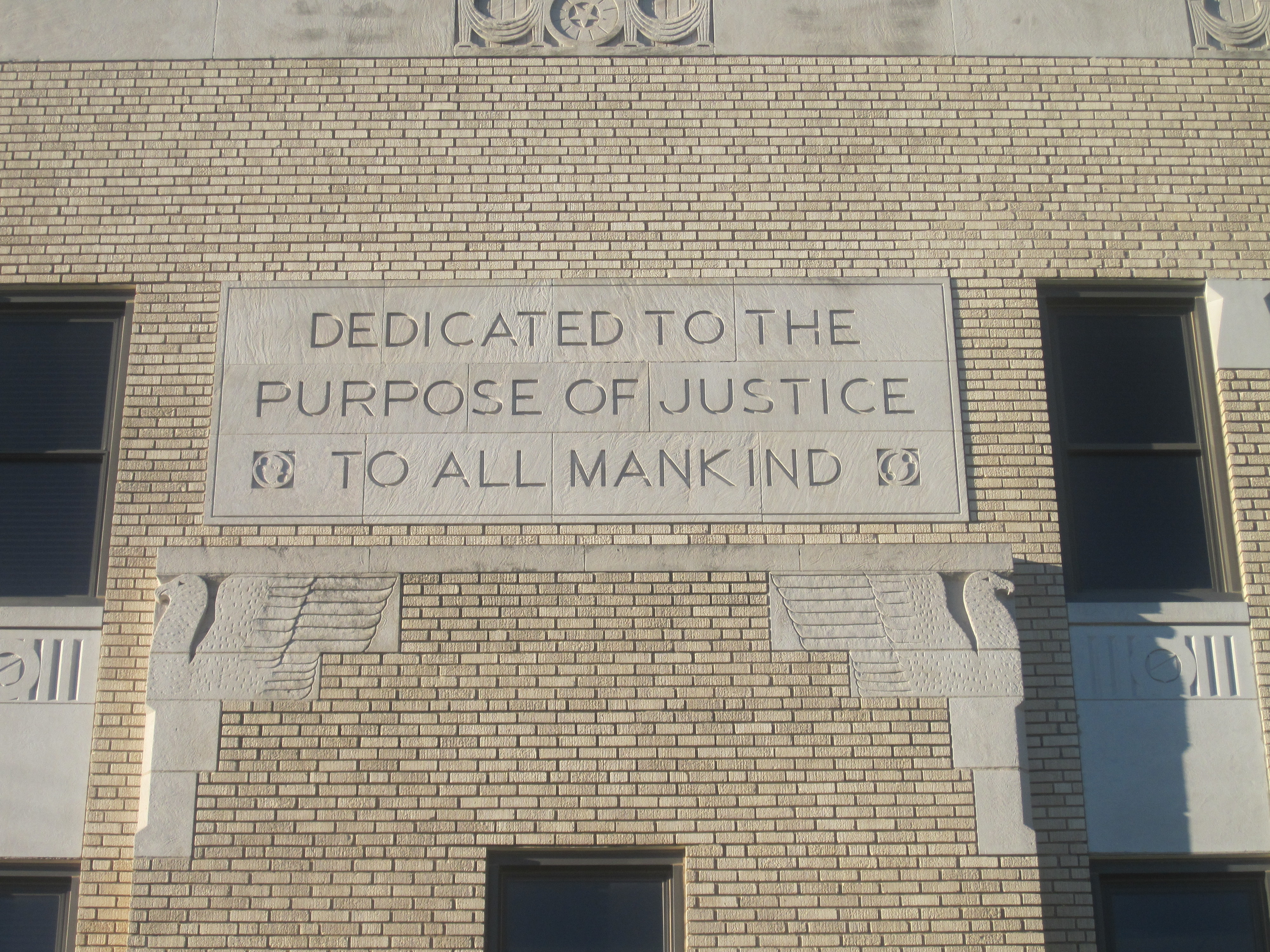
The Ochiltree County Courthouse contains the inscription on one side, "Dedicated to the Purpose of Justice to All Mankind."

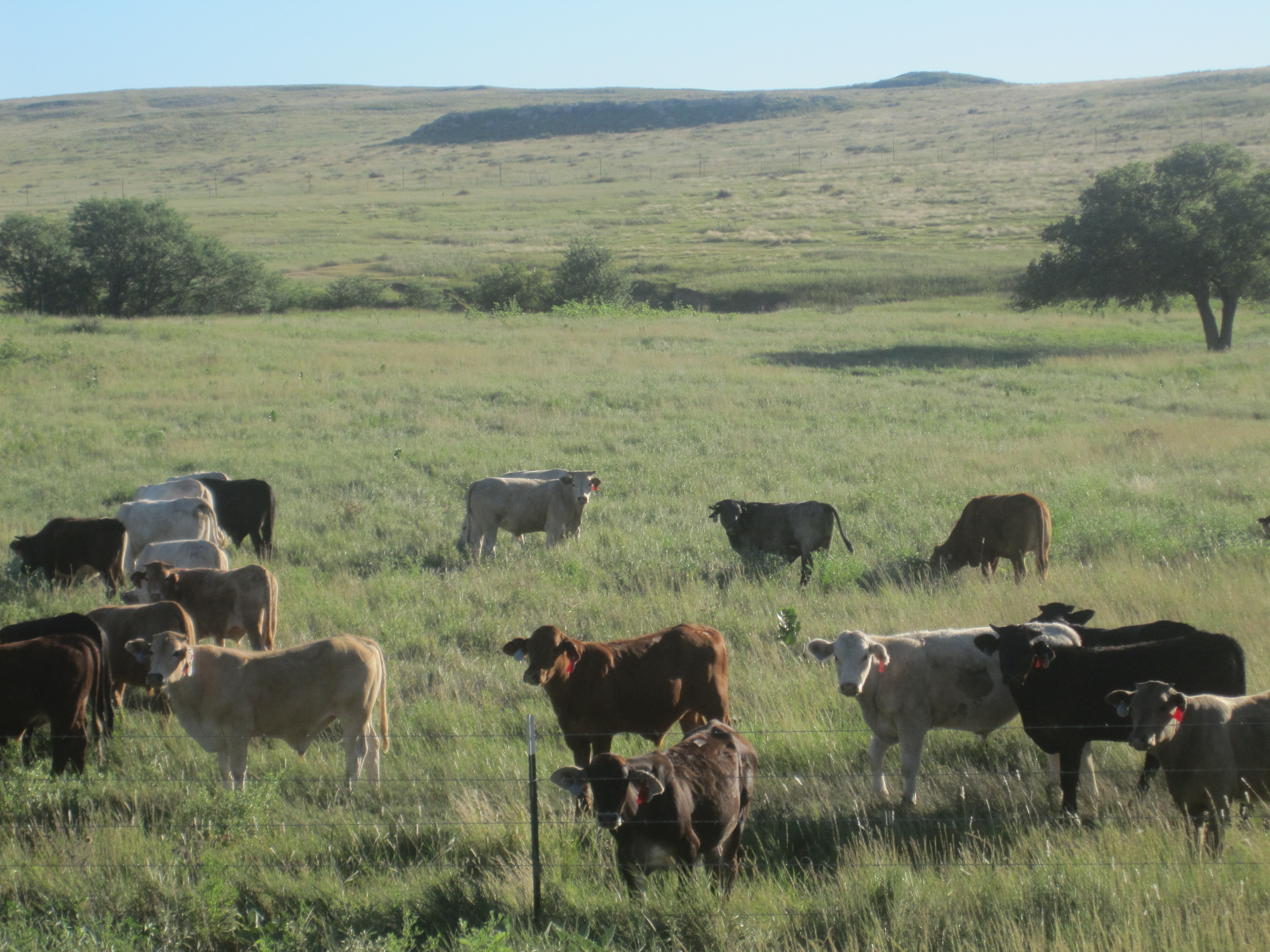
Cattle grazing in Ochiltree County south of Perryton off U.S. Highway 83

Ochiltree County (/ˈɒkəlˌtriː/ OK-əl-TREE) is a county located in the panhandle of the U.S. state of Texas. As of the 2020 census, its population was 10,015. The county seat is Perryton. The county was created in 1876 and organized in 1889 and is named for William Beck Ochiltree, who was an attorney general of the Republic of Texas. It was previously one of 30 prohibition or entirely dry counties in the state of Texas.

== Geography ==
According to the U.S. Census Bureau, the county has a total area of 918 sq mi (2,380 km^{2}), almost all land, and 0.5 sq mi (1.3 km^{2}) (0.06%) is covered by water.

=== Major highways ===
- U.S. Highway 83
- State Highway 15
- State Highway 70
- Loop 143
- Spur 192

=== Adjacent counties ===
- Texas County, Oklahoma (north)
- Beaver County, Oklahoma (northeast)
- Lipscomb County (east)
- Roberts County (south)
- Hansford County (west)
- Hemphill County (southeast)

== Demographics ==
Historical population
Census	Pop.	Note	%±
1890	198		—
1900	267		34.8%
1910	1,602		500.0%
1920	2,331		45.5%
1930	5,224		124.1%
1940	4,213		−19.4%
1950	6,024		43.0%
1960	9,380		55.7%
1970	9,704		3.5%
1980	9,588		−1.2%
1990	9,128		−4.8%
2000	9,006		−1.3%
2010	10,223		13.5%
2020	10,015		−2.0%
2025 (est.)	9,284	▼	−7.3%
U.S. Decennial Census; 1850–1900 1910; 1920 1930 1940; 1950 1960 1970; 1980 1990 2000; 2010 2020

=== Racial and ethnic composition ===
Ochiltree County, Texas – Racial and ethnic composition Note: the US Census treats Hispanic/Latino as an ethnic category. This table excludes Latinos from the racial categories and assigns them to a separate category. Hispanics/Latinos may be of any race.
Race / Ethnicity (NH = Non-Hispanic)	Pop 2000	Pop 2010	Pop 2020	% 2000	% 2010	% 2020
White alone (NH)	5,972	5,062	4,245	66.31%	49.52%	42.39%
Black or African American alone (NH)	8	19	14	0.09%	0.19%	0.14%
Native American or Alaska Native alone (NH)	64	66	31	0.71%	0.65%	0.31%
Asian alone (NH)	32	24	28	0.36%	0.23%	0.28%
Pacific Islander alone (NH)	1	3	2	0.01%	0.03%	0.02%
Other race alone (NH)	4	0	21	0.04%	0.00%	0.21%
Mixed race or Multiracial (NH)	62	67	204	0.69%	0.66%	2.04%
Hispanic or Latino (any race)	2,863	4,982	5,470	31.79%	48.73%	54.62%
Total	9,006	10,223	10,015	100.00%	100.00%	100.00%

=== 2020 census ===
As of the 2020 census, the county had a population of 10,015. The median age was 33.9 years, 30.2% of residents were under the age of 18, and 12.4% of residents were 65 years of age or older. For every 100 females, there were 102.6 males, and for every 100 females age 18 and over, there were 101.8 males.

The racial makeup of the county was 56.1% White, 0.2% Black or African American, 1.5% American Indian and Alaska Native, 0.3% Asian, <0.1% Native Hawaiian and Pacific Islander, 24.3% from some other race, and 17.6% from two or more races. Hispanic or Latino residents of any race comprised 54.6% of the population.

83.8% of residents lived in urban areas, while 16.2% lived in rural areas.

There were 3,622 households in the county, of which 41.7% had children under the age of 18 living in them. Of all households, 57.7% were married-couple households, 17.7% were households with a male householder and no spouse or partner present, and 20.5% were households with a female householder and no spouse or partner present. About 24.7% of all households were made up of individuals, and 10.4% had someone living alone who was 65 years of age or older.

There were 4,332 housing units, of which 16.4% were vacant. Among occupied housing units, 73.6% were owner-occupied, and 26.4% were renter-occupied. The homeowner vacancy rate was 1.5%, and the rental vacancy rate was 22.9%.

=== 2000 census ===
As of the 2000 census, 9,006 people, 3,261 households, and 2,488 families were residing in the county. The population density was 10 people per square mile (3.9 people/km^{2}). The 3,769 housing units averaged 4 units per square mile (1.5/km^{2}). The racial makeup of the county was 86.2% White, 0.13% African American, 0.94% Native American, 0.39% Asian, 10.29% from other races, and 2.04% from two or more races. About 13.79% of the population were Hispanics or Latinos of any race. In terms of ancestry, 11.3% were of German, 10.3% were of Irish, 6.3% were of English, 5.4% were of American, and 1.5% were of Dutch, 1.5% were of Polish.

Of the 3,261 households, 40.9% had children under the age of 18, 64% were married couples living together, 7.9% had a female householder with no husband present, and 23.7% were not families. About 21% of all households were made up of individuals, and 9.30% had someone living alone who was 65 years of age or older. The average household size was 2.74, and the average family size was 3.18.

In the county, the population distribution was 30.6% under the age of 18, 8.4% from 18 to 24, 28.7% from 25 to 44, 20.7% from 45 to 64, and 11.7% who were 65 years of age or older. The median age was 34 years. For every 100 females, there were 99.8 males. For every 100 females age 18 and over, there were 96.9 males.

The median income for a household was $38,013, and for a family was $45,565. Males had a median income of $31,558 versus $19,890. The per capita income for the county was $16,707. About 13% of the population and 9.8% of families were below the poverty line; 17.9% of those under the age of 18 and 8.7% of those 65 and older were living below the poverty line.

Those making less than $25,000 per year comprised 32.2% of the population, while 1.9% made more than $150,000, according to the 2000 census. Around 17.5% of the population made less than $15,000 per year, while 6.06% made more than $100,000.

== Politics ==
Since the 1950s, Ochiltree has been an overwhelmingly Republican county. The last Democrat to carry the county was Harry S. Truman in 1948; Truman won 73.06% of the county's vote, more than twice the percentage any Democratic candidate has won in the subsequent 17 presidential elections. Even Texan Lyndon Johnson did not reach 35% in his 1964 landslide, when Ochiltree was easily Goldwater’s strongest Texas county. Indeed, Jimmy Carter in 1976 was the last Democrat to win 20% of the county's vote, and the last to reach even 10% was Bill Clinton in 1996.

In 2004 in Ochiltree County, 92.0% of voters (2,922) voted for George W. Bush, while 7.9% (251 people) voted for John Kerry. Two people voted for Michael Badnarik (Libertarian). This is tied for the second-highest percentage of votes Bush received for any county in the US (in both 2000 and 2004). It is the highest percentage during the 2004 election (only Glasscock County, Texas, at 93.1%, had a higher percentage in the 2000 Presidential election).

In 2008, 91.7% of voters supported Senator John McCain, whereas only 7.8% of voters supported Senator Barack Obama.

Ochiltree County is located within District 87 of the Texas House of Representatives. Ochiltree County is located within District 31 of the Texas Senate.

United States presidential election results for Ochiltree County, Texas
Year	Republican		Democratic		Third party(ies)	
Year	No.	%	No.	%	No.	%
1912	0	0.00%	93	83.78%	18	16.22%
1916	41	14.29%	238	82.93%	8	2.79%
1920	135	32.53%	280	67.47%	0	0.00%
1924	155	27.58%	352	62.63%	55	9.79%
1928	556	67.31%	270	32.69%	0	0.00%
1932	183	14.18%	1,097	84.97%	11	0.85%
1936	109	8.64%	1,111	88.03%	42	3.33%
1940	294	19.51%	1,213	80.49%	0	0.00%
1944	307	23.45%	863	65.93%	139	10.62%
1948	344	24.52%	1,025	73.06%	34	2.42%
1952	1,755	80.39%	426	19.51%	2	0.09%
1956	1,209	69.48%	512	29.43%	19	1.09%
1960	1,870	78.11%	521	21.76%	3	0.13%
1964	1,814	66.28%	920	33.61%	3	0.11%
1968	2,208	70.50%	432	13.79%	492	15.71%
1972	2,861	89.35%	298	9.31%	43	1.34%
1976	2,471	68.89%	1,084	30.22%	32	0.89%
1980	3,032	81.90%	594	16.05%	76	2.05%
1984	3,492	89.15%	419	10.70%	6	0.15%
1988	2,928	83.25%	579	16.46%	10	0.28%
1992	2,419	68.06%	557	15.67%	578	16.26%
1996	2,448	79.20%	467	15.11%	176	5.69%
2000	2,687	90.72%	251	8.47%	24	0.81%
2004	2,922	91.97%	251	7.90%	4	0.13%
2008	2,851	91.70%	243	7.82%	15	0.48%
2012	2,719	90.85%	253	8.45%	21	0.70%
2016	2,628	87.54%	274	9.13%	100	3.33%
2020	2,812	89.10%	302	9.57%	42	1.33%
2024	2,723	90.47%	269	8.94%	18	0.60%

United States Senate election results for Ochiltree County, Texas1
Year	Republican		Democratic		Third party(ies)	
Year	No.	%	No.	%	No.	%
2024	2,669	89.09%	280	9.35%	47	1.57%

United States Senate election results for Ochiltree County, Texas2
Year	Republican		Democratic		Third party(ies)	
Year	No.	%	No.	%	No.	%
2020	2,783	89.60%	278	8.95%	45	1.45%

Texas Gubernatorial election results for Ochiltree County
Year	Republican		Democratic		Third party(ies)	
Year	No.	%	No.	%	No.	%
2022	1,975	92.90%	135	6.35%	16	0.75%

== Education ==
Of the population aged 25 and older (5,441 people), 14.6% did not have a high school diploma, compared with 12.9% statewide. About 27% of the county's residents reported that a high school diploma was their highest level of educational attainment, compared with 24.8% statewide; 16.1% had a bachelor's degree or higher, compared with 23.2% statewide.

The Allen campus of Frank Phillips College is located in Perryton.

== Communities ==
=== City ===
- Perryton (county seat)

=== Town ===
- Booker (mostly in Lipscomb County)

=== Census-designated places ===
- Farnsworth
- Waka

== In popular culture ==
Ochiltree County is the setting for the Hank the Cowdog series of children's books, in the unincorporated city of Twitchell.

== See also ==
- Dry counties
- List of museums in the Texas Panhandle
- National Register of Historic Places listings in Ochiltree County, Texas
- Recorded Texas Historic Landmarks in Ochiltree County
