= Hank the Cowdog =

John R. Erickson's Children Book

- Hank the Cowdog logo
- Author: John R. Erickson
- Illustrator: Gerald L. Holmes
- Cover artist: Gerald L. Holmes
- Country: United States
- Language: English
- Genre: Children's fiction
- Publisher: Maverick Books (original); Puffin Books (reprints); Editorial Sudamericana (Spanish)
- Published: 1983 – current
- Media type: Print, ebook, audiobook
- No. of books: 84

Hank the Cowdog is a long-running American series of children's books written by John R. Erickson and illustrated originally by Gerald L. Holmes, and later by Nikki Earley. The books follow Hank, a dog who views himself as the "Head of Ranch Security". Hank suffers a superiority complex, and thinks he is smarter than everybody else; his intelligence is limited to that of the average dog. In each book Hank and other characters must deal with several events, issues and mysteries that occur at their Texas Panhandle home in Ochiltree County. The name of the ranch is never mentioned in any of the stories. The series began in 1982, with a couple of short stories about Hank and his friends; since then, 84 printed books and seven audio-only books have been published. Hank the Cowdog was previously published via Maverick Books, with Puffin Books holding the current American publishing rights in English. Each book features songs that Erickson performs on the audiobook editions. The series has received awards and critical acclaim, and the books have sold more than eight million copies worldwide. It has been published in several languages including Spanish, Danish, Persian, and Chinese. In the 1980s, the first book was adapted into an animated segment for CBS Storybreak.

Teaching programs are available for the series via Maverick Books and a story entitled The Case of the Dancing Cowboy was serialized in 2002, in several American newspapers.

== Characters ==
Hank: Hank is the main character and narrator of each story in the Hank the Cowdog adventures. Hank is the only character to appear in every single story in the series. Hank claims to be a "purebred top-of-the-line blue-ribbon cowdog", and that may in fact be true. According to the official Hank The Cowdog Website, Hank is based on a real Australian Shepherd named "Hank". He styles himself as the "Head of Ranch Security" and conducts security sweeps and nightly patrols. However his real task is to serve as the assistant to Slim and Loper in herding cattle. Hank has a superiority complex which causes him to have an inflated sense of his own intelligence, strength, courage and attractiveness. As a result of this, Hank frequently finds himself in sticky situations, usually of his own creation. Much of the humor of the series comes from Hank as narrator shamelessly attempting to make himself seem more competent with hindsight than he really was, but the reader is rarely fooled. Despite his flaws Hank is deeply loyal to his family and the ranch community and usually rises to the occasion at the moment of true crisis. He has a sister named Maggie, who has four puppies named Barbara, Roscoe, April, and Spot. She is much more refined than her brother and sees Hank as a disappointment and a bad influence on his nieces and nephews. She tries to get him to leave whenever he visits her, all the while trying to be nice. Hank is based on an Australian Shepherd named Hank that was owned by a neighbor of Erickson's when he was managing a ranch in Oklahoma. The neighbor wanted to use the dog to help with the cattle but the dog was not trained and proved a hassle.

Drover: Drover is a younger dog who lives on the ranch with Hank as his best friend. Hank refers to him as his assistant, or as a "little mutt" when Hank is angry with him. Unlike Hank, Drover has no delusions of grandeur and enjoys spending most his time staying out of trouble and sleeping (16 hours a day according to Hank), often engaging in useless tasks he invents for himself. Drover is lazy and tends to be wimpy and not helpful when it comes to helping Hank with tasks. In The Case of the Car-Barkaholic Dog, for example, Hank observes that while he is helping the cowboys with the cattle herding, Drover spends the afternoon chewing on an old horn, buries it, and then promptly forgets where it is buried. He is also unashamedly timid, and frequently avoids "the call of duty" by pretending to have a bad leg. Drover has a great deal of curiosity and often asks Hank obscure questions such as "Why does the moon rise in the evening and set in the morning?" Hank rarely knows the answer to these questions, but this doesn't stop him from providing ones. Drover often appears to have more common sense than Hank, which allows him to avoid getting into many of the same catastrophes Hank creates for himself. However, he is not very smart, frequently taking figures of speech literally, and misunderstanding the military jargon which Hank often uses. Drover appears in every story in the series, with the exception of A1: The Homeless Pooch.

Sally May: Sally May is married to High Loper and the mother of Little Alfred and Baby Molly. She is a housewife who enjoys parties and often serves as a civilizing check on her cowboy husband. She is often high-strung, particularly in "The Case of the Killer Stud Horse" and "The Phantom in the Mirror", when she has company coming over. Pete the Barn Cat is her favorite pet and she is affectionate towards both him and Drover. She dislikes Hank, however, and frequently gets angry at him for coming into her yard, her house or fighting with Pete. Her most common response when angered is to try to hit him with her broom. Despite this Hank often seems to think that Sally May secretly respects him. In reality, her feelings fluctuate between disgust and temporary respect as Hank usually follows up his shenanigans with an act of heroism.

High Loper: Owner of the ranch, High Loper (his last name is never given) is an old-fashioned cowboy who enjoys roping, riding and working his ranch. While Loper never wants to leave the ranch and is loath to go out of town, he is far from a workaholic, settling for shoddy workmanship on many of his projects and pawning the dirty work onto his ranch hand, Slim Chance. His more anti-social cowboy instincts have been tamed by his wife, who he loves. However, in some episodes he expresses nostalgia for the times when he was just a simple cowboy. In "Murder in the Middle Pasture" when Sally May is giving Slim a lecture on how he will understand the importance of social events when he is married, Loper mouths the words "no you won't" behind her back. While Loper makes fun of Hank frequently and is often angry at him, he also relies on Hank to help with the cattle herding. In "Every Dog Has His Day" Hank saves Loper from some quicksand, proving his loyalty to his master. He is shown to be stubborn. He often refuses to listen to the advice of Slim Chance, which usually ends with some type of incident occurring which Slim had tried to warn him about.

Little Alfred: Loper and Sally May's older child. Little Alfred (middle name Leroy) likes Hank and often participates in adventures with him. Some of these are harmless, though in "The Case of the Hooking Bull" Alfred deliberately tricks Hank into going into the dryer and then turns the machine on, showing he has a mischievous streak. Most of the story "Lost in the Dark Unchanted Forest" revolves around Hank's search for Alfred when he goes missing in the woods. In this story and a few others Alfred is shown to have the ability to talk to animals, although in later stories he does not appear to have this ability. It is revealed that the older a child gets, the more their ability to understand animals diminishes. Hank is very protective of Alfred and frequently risks his life to protect him, labeling it every cowdog's duty. In fact, he saves Alfreds life several times, such as in "The Black Hooded Hangmans". Alfred first appears in book #2, The Further Adventures of Hank the Cowdog, though he is referred to at that time only as "the baby."

Pete the Barn Cat: Hank's primary antagonist on the ranch. Pete is Sally May's favorite pet and he frequently uses this to his advantage in his petty clashes with Hank. Pete is much more clever than Hank and usually manages to outwit him, although Hank usually perceives the events differently. Many of Hank's adventures are initiated by an embarrassing incident where he has been tricked by Pete. In "The Further Adventures of Hank the Cowdog", Hank's eyes go crossed after staring at a bloody nose he received by attacking a fried egg Pete obtained that was just behind Sally May's garden fence. In "The Curse of the Incredible Priceless Corncob", the entire story revolves around Hank's over-protectiveness towards a corncob Pete has tricked him into believing is worth a fortune. In "The Case of the Missing Cat" Hank eventually loses patience with Pete and tries to strand him on the plains, but has a change of heart and rescues him from the coyotes Rip and Snort. The two then lament the fact that by saving Pete's life Hank and Pete must be friends and stop fighting each other. At the end of the adventure, however, the two return to fighting over scraps, suggesting that they both secretly like their antagonistic relationship. Pete is also referred to as "Pete The Cow Cat" in the book "The Case Of The Perfect Dog", where Pete wanted to replace Hank as top dog. Although Pete usually manages to outwit Hank initially, Hank sometimes gets revenge near the end of the story, such as in "The Case of the Dinosaur Birds." In the "Secret Sleeping Powder Files", Pete becomes lost, and Hank reluctantly helps find him, at the request of Sally May.

Slim Chance: A lazy but loyal cowboy and ranch hand that works for High Loper. It is unclear how long Slim has worked at the ranch, but despite several comments made about wanting to move to a bigger operation, he has never quit. He does most of the work on the ranch that Loper does not want, and occasionally gets forced into babysitting Little Alfred, for whom he has an affinity. Slim lives in a rundown shack two miles from ranch headquarters, and maintains a filthy house, frequently leaving old dishes, clothes, food, and livestock magazines lying around and fostering a chronic rodent problem. He also hates cooking, which results in him maintaining a horrible diet and eating things that would disgust the average reader, like sardine and ketchup sandwiches and boiled turkey necks. Slim loves pranks, including placing a smoke bomb in the town's volunteer fire department truck and tricking Loper into believing there was a fire causing him to start the truck and set it off. He is prone to making poor decisions, usually due to laziness, often with disastrous consequences. He frequently compares himself to Hank in this regard. Often, when Hank gets into trouble, Slim does not stay mad at him, stating that Hank reminds him of himself. Although Slim loves to play pranks on Hank and poke fun at him, it is clear he has an affinity for both him and Drover, frequently asking them to come along with him on odd jobs. Hank saves his life on several occasions, such as in "The Case of the Prowling Bear" and "The Hooking Bull". The first audio-only book, The Homeless Pooch, establishes that Slim is Hank's owner; however, in other books in the series Hank and Drover are said to be Loper's dogs, or even Alfred's. He speaks with a strong southern drawl. He plays a role in almost every book, and appears most frequently of all the human characters.

Wallace and Junior: Two buzzards that Hank sometimes encounters. Wallace, an old buzzard and father to Junior, is very harsh and abrasive, not easily getting along with most of the other characters of the series. He is also relatively single-minded, judging most things mainly on their usefulness as a food source. He doesn't seem to like Hank much, but sometimes acts decently towards him. Junior, Wallace's slow and clumsy son, is more timid than his father. He also has a stutter. He loves his father but often makes Wallace angry by being cowardly, being friendly towards other animals (who Wallace says they should rather think about eating), and generally being bad at being a buzzard. Wallace also loathes Junior's love of singing.

Rip and Snort: Two coyote brothers who sometimes feel friendly towards Hank, but are forever threatening to eat him. At one point in The Original Adventures of Hank the Cowdog however, Hank, Rip, and Snort became friends. However, they are enemies in most of other books. The brothers are "All brawn and no brain", and Hank manages to escape from sticky situations involving them by tricking them. In once case, Hank convinces them that if they stick their heads on either sides of a hollow log, and count to 50,000, the moon which is made of chicken, will fall, and they can eat it. Unlike the other characters, Rip and Snort, like all the coyotes, have limited English skills. As a result, they frequently misunderstand what Hank is saying, and insist that their way of pronouncing certain words is the correct one. This leads to some very humorous situations. They call Hank "Hunk", as do all the coyotes.

Scraunch: A vicious coyote near the top of the pack's pecking order, he maintains an intense hatred of Hank. He is the brother of Missy Coyote, to which Hank was once promised in marriage. He is smarter, tougher, and more grumpy than Rip and Snort.

Missy Coyote: A coyote who was at one point promised to be Hank's mate if Hank attacked the ranch and killed Drover. Hank ultimately refused to do so, showing that he is loyal to the ranch inhabitants, and loyal to Drover as a good friend. Hank seems to share Missy's feelings, and though he doesn't like coyotes it seemed that at one point he seriously considered joining Missy's pack. Missy was originally named, "Girl-Who-Drink-Blood", but Hank disliked the name, instead calling her Missy Coyote. Unlike most of Hank's crushes, Missy actually considers him cute.

Beulah: A collie who resides on a local ranch, and with whom Hank is madly in love. He is constantly trying to impress her, which usually results in his making a fool of himself instead. Beulah lives on her ranch with her boyfriend Plato, a bird dog whom Hank despises. Although she likes Hank as a friend, she does not return his love, and tries to let him down easy for fear of hurting his feelings. Despite this, Hank continues to be convinced Beulah is in love with him, and would express it if it weren't for Plato.

Plato: A polite bird dog who likes Hank despite Hank's obvious disdain for him. He is in love with Beulah, much to Hank's consternation, and seems not to notice or care that Hank is constantly trying to court her. He also seems to be oblivious to Hank's malice towards him. He has only very minor roles, except in a handful of stories. These include The Case of the Missing Bird Dog and The Quest for the Great White Quail, in which he got lost and Hank had to find him, and "The Case of the Missing Collie", in which he has to help Hank find Beulah and save her from Scraunch.

Madame Moonshine: A "witchy little burrowing owl" who assists Hank on occasion. She often refers to Hank as "Hank the Rabbit," and she has a bodyguard, a rattlesnake named Timothy. When she does use her magic, it normally is very odd and may not have the desired results. For example, in Lost in the Dark Unchanted Forest, she and Hank were tied upside-down to a tree branch, while Rip and Snort were planning to eat them below. She recited a spell to make them stop, but, because they were upside-down, it just made them sing their song backwards.

JT Cluck: The head rooster on the ranch. He often tries to provide Hank with information about strange events on the ranch, but this information is usually wrong, as he is an unreliable witness. For instance, he once made a report to Hank that the sky was going to fall. In another instance, he mistakes Hank and Drover for prowling coyotes. His stories are often long winded, causing Hank to become frustrated with him. He takes pleasure in catching Hank sleeping during the day, and waking him up in order to give him his "information". He has a wife named Elsa, who is the source of many of his stories.

Dog Pound Ralph: A basset hound who lives in the local dog pound. His owner, Jimmy Joe, works at the pound and just puts him in whichever kennel is currently available. He has a fairly uneventful life, except when his owner lets him out as happens in The Fling. Ralph was introduced in book #3 It's a Dog's Life.

Eddy the Rac: A raccoon who occasionally shows up and causes trouble. He was orphaned as a baby and Slim took care of him for a while in Moonlight Madness. He causes Hank to be confused every time he appears, from posing as monsters/aliens to convincingly telling Hank a variety of tall-tales. Everytime Slim puts Eddy in a cage, Eddy convinces Hank to let him out and enter the cage himself, at which point Eddy locks him in. Despite this, Hank continues to be fooled and does not particularly like Eddy.

Bobby Kile: The local deputy officer who comes to the ranch or calls Slim and Loper when something isn't right, especially when there's a criminal on the loose or there's a local problem. He appears in books 35, 48, 55, 58, 60, 61, 69, 71, 74, and 76. He also likes to play pranks on Slim.

Miss Viola: Slim Chance's love interest. She lives with her parents not to far from his place. Slim proposed to her in "The Big Question". Her father Woodrow convinces Slim to invest money into livestock and allows him to use his land keep them there, in "The Case of the Monster Fire".

Buster and Mugs: A pair of stray dogs who live in town, but sometimes venture out to the ranch. They are very tough and antagonistic. Buster is shown to be very cunning and intelligent, but Mugs is impulsive and not very smart, sometimes causing Buster to be angry at him. They have a grudge against Hank, and frequently come on to the ranch to cause trouble. Hank is not strong enough to fight them off, so he usually relies on outside sources to get rid of them. At least twice, he tricks the coyotes into fighting with them instead. They usually have two other dogs with them who are part of their gang, but these dogs never speak, and their names are not given.

== List of books ==
1. The Original Adventures of Hank the Cowdog (1983)
2. The Further Adventures of Hank the Cowdog (1983)
3. It's a Dog's Life (1984)
4. Murder in the Middle Pasture (1984)
5. Faded Love (1985)
6. Let Sleeping Dogs Lie (1986)
7. The Curse of the Incredible Priceless Corncob (1986)
8. The Case of the One-Eyed Killer Stud Horse (1987)
9. The Case of the Halloween Ghost (1987)
10. Every Dog Has His Day (1988)
11. Lost in the Dark Unchanted Forest (1988)
12. The Case of the Fiddle Playing Fox (1989)
13. The Wounded Buzzard on Christmas Eve (1989)
14. Hank the Cowdog and Monkey Business (1990)
15. The Case of the Missing Cat (1990)
16. Lost in the Blinded Blizzard (1991)
17. The Case of the Car-Barkaholic Dog (1991)
18. The Case of the Hooking Bull (1992)
19. The Case of the Midnight Rustler (1992)
20. The Phantom in the Mirror (1993)
21. The Case of the Vampire Cat (1993)
22. The Case of the Double Bumblebee Sting (1994)
23. Moonlight Madness (1994)
24. The Case of the Black-Hooded Hangmans (1995)
25. The Case of the Swirling Killer Tornado (1995)
26. The Case of the Kidnapped Collie (1996)
27. The Case of the Night-Stalking Bone Monster (1996)
28. The Mopwater Files (1997)
29. The Case of the Vampire Vacuum Sweeper (1997)
30. The Case of the Haystack Kitties (1998)
31. The Case of the Vanishing Fishhook (1998)
32. The Garbage Monster from Outer Space (1999)
33. The Case of the Measled Cowboy (1999)
34. Slim's Good-bye (2000)
35. The Case of the Saddle House Robbery (2000)
36. The Case of the Raging Rottweiler (2000)
37. The Case of the Deadly Ha-Ha Game (2001)
38. The Fling (2001)
39. The Secret Laundry Monster Files (2002)
40. The Case of the Missing Bird Dog (2002)
41. The Case of the Shipwrecked Tree (2003)
42. The Case of the Burrowing Robot (2003)
43. The Case of the Twisted Kitty (2004)
44. The Dungeon of Doom (2004)
45. The Case of the Falling Sky (2005)
46. The Case of the Tricky Trap (2005)
47. The Case of the Tender Cheeping Chickies (2006)
48. The Case of the Monkey Burglar (2006)
49. The Case of the Booby-Trapped Pickup (2007)
50. The Case of the Most Ancient Bone (2007)
51. The Case of the Blazing Sky (2008)
52. The Quest for the Great White Quail (2008)
53. Drover's Secret Life (2009)
54. The Case of the Dinosaur Birds (2009)
55. The Case of the Secret Weapon (2010)
56. The Case of the Coyote Invasion (2010)
57. The Disappearance of Drover (2011)
58. The Case of the Mysterious Voice (2011)
59. The Case of the Perfect Dog (2012)
60. The Big Question (2012)
61. The Case of the Prowling Bear (2013)
62. The Ghost of Rabbits Past (2013)
63. The Return of The Charlie Monsters (2014)
64. The Case of the Three Rings (2014)
65. The Almost Last Roundup (2015)
66. The Christmas Turkey Disaster (2015)
67. Wagons West (2016)
68. The Secret Pledge (2016)
69. The Case of the Wandering Goats (2017)
70. The Case of the Troublesome Lady (2017)
71. The Case of the Monster Fire (2018)
72. The Case of the Three-Toed Tree Sloth (2018)
73. The Case of the Buried Deer (2019)
74. The Frozen Rodeo (2020)
75. The Case of the Red Rubber Ball (2020)
76. The Case of the Missing Teeth (2021)
77. The Case of the Lost Camp (2021)
78. The Incredible Ice Event (2022)
79. Double Trouble (2023)
80. The Secret Sleeping Powder Files (2023)
81. The Case of the Airborne Invasion (2024)
82. The Case of the Poetic Bird Dog (2024)
83. The Case of the Poison Toad (2025)
84. The Case of the Dog-Wrecking Horse (2026)

== Audio ==
Books 1 – 42 have cassette versions. All books have audio book versions.

=== Audio only ===
Some books are only on audio. The numbers for these are always A#; for example, The Homeless Pooch would be A1.

1. The Homeless Pooch (2004)
2. The Watermelon Patch Mystery (2005)
3. The Kitty Cheater (2006)
4. The Runaway Windmill (2007)
5. The Cookie Moon (2008)
6. The Dancing Cowboy (2009)
7. The Valentine's Day Robbery (2010)

== Adaptations ==
=== CBS Storybreak ===
In 1985, CBS Storybreak aired an animated episode based on the first Hank the Cowdog book, with Frank Welker as the voice of Hank.

=== Hank the Cowdog (TV series) ===
Hank the Cowdog is an upcoming animated adaptation based on the books. It will be produced by HTC Productions and Huhu Studios. It was first unveiled at a MIPJunior content market in 2015. So far there is no specific release date for the series. The series will be done in 2D animation and will have 13 episodes.

There was a previous attempt at a TV series adaptation in the late 1990s. It was going to be produced by Nickelodeon, WildBrain and 501 Productions. The series would have blended 2D animation with live-action backgrounds. A test reel was uploaded onto Vimeo in 2015.

=== Hank the Cowdog (podcast) ===
A five episode podcast adapting Lost in the Dark Unchanted Forest was produced by QCode and released in September 2020. The series was written and directed by film director and writer Jeff Nichols. It starred the voices of Matthew McConaughey as Hank, Jesse Plemons as Drover, Kirsten Dunst as Sally May, John R. Erickson as Wallace the buzzard, Scoot McNairy as Junior, Michael Shannon as Sinister the Bobcat, Joel Edgerton as Rip and Snort, Leslie Jordan as Pete the Barn Cat and Cynthia Erivo as Madame Moonshine.
