= Perryton, Texas =

- City
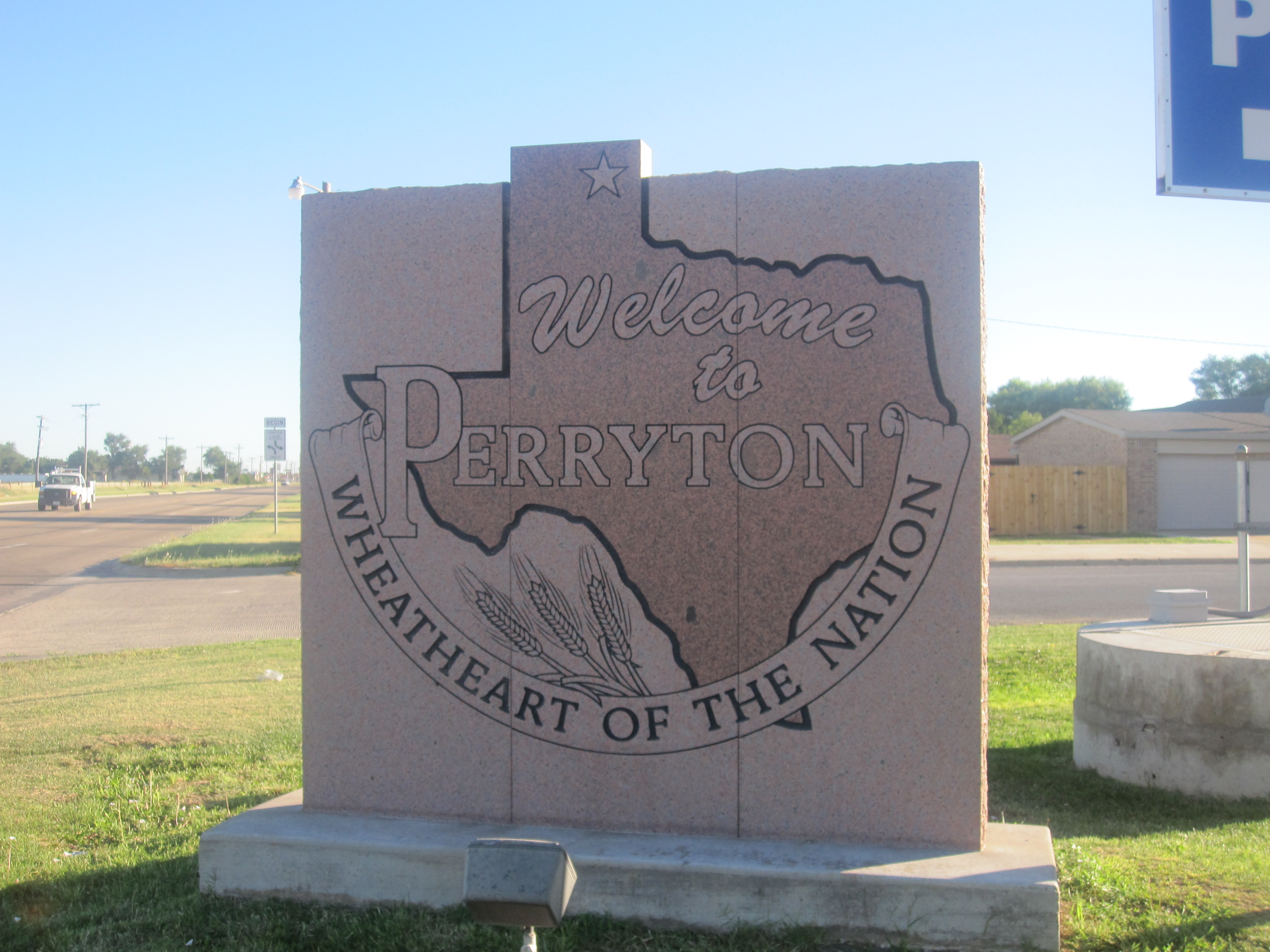
- Welcome Sign (2010)
- Nickname: "Wheatheart of the Nation"
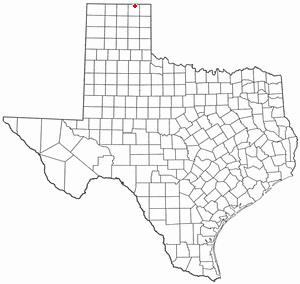
- Location of Perryton within Texas

- Location in the United States
- Coordinates: 36°23′30″N 100°48′22″W
- Country: United States
- State: Texas
- County: Ochiltree
- Founded: 1919
- Named for: George Perry

Area
  - Total: 4.80 sq mi (12.43 km^{2})
  - Land: 4.80 sq mi (12.43 km^{2})
  - Water: 0 sq mi (0.00 km^{2})
- Elevation: 2,927 ft (892 m)

Population (2020)
  - Total: 8,492
  - Density: 1,769/sq mi (683.2/km^{2})
- Time zone: UTC-6
  - Summer (DST): UTC-5 (CDT)
- ZIP code: 79070
- Area code: 806
- FIPS code: 48-56912
- GNIS ID: 2411406
- Website: cityofperryton.com

Perryton is a city in and the county seat of Ochiltree County, Texas, United States. As of the 2020 census, the population of the city was 8,492. It is located a few miles south of the Texas / Oklahoma state line.

== History ==
A rail line was created between mid-1916 and mid-1920 from Shattuck, Oklahoma to Spearman, Texas, as built by the North Texas and Santa Fe Railway and operated by the Panhandle and Santa Fe Railway. When neither of the communities of Ochiltree or Gray got the railroad, the citizens decided to move both towns to the railroad and merge into a new community named Perryton. It was named after George M. Perry, an early county judge.

=== 2023 tornado ===
On the evening of June 15, 2023, an EF3 tornado struck north Perryton. The devastating tornado tracked southeast, destroying dozens of mobile homes before impacting downtown, downing a cell tower, two communications towers, as well as damaging multiple industrial buildings. One mobile home caught fire and spread to many more homes throughout a mobile home park. After the tornado struck the town, three deaths were confirmed and over 100 injuries were sustained.

== Geography ==
According to the United States Census Bureau, the city has a total area of 4.5 sq mi (12 km^{2}), of which 0.04 square miles (0.10 km^{2}) (0.45%) is covered by water.

=== Climate ===
Perryton has a borderline humid subtropical climate (Köppen Cfa)/cool semi-arid climate (BSk). Winter mornings are very cold: 137.9 mornings on average fall to or below freezing and 4.4 mornings each year can be expected to fall so low as 0 °F or −17.8 °C. This indicates heavy continental influence courtesy of its far inland position. Actual winter weather is extremely variable, ranging from extremely cold due to Arctic outbreaks from the Yukon to a three-month winter average of six afternoons above 70 °F (21.1 °C) due to hot chinook winds blowing off the Rocky Mountains. In some cases, these chinooks can produce extremely rapid increases in temperature; during February 10, 2017, the temperature rose from 25 °F (−3.9 °C) in the morning to 92 °F (33.3 °C) in the afternoon and down to 46 °F (7.8 °C) the following morning.

Summers are hot, although mornings remain relatively mild. Nine mornings each year can be expected to stay above 68 °F (20 °C), but virtually none stay above 77 °F (25 °C), although the temperature did not fall below 79 °F (26.1 °C) on July 10, 2016. However, 70.5 afternoons reach 90 °F (32.2 °C), with 12.3 afternoons topping 100 °F (37.8 °C), and a record high of 113 °F (45 °C) on June 26, 2011. The coldest morning was −17 °F (−27.2 °C) on January 7, 1988, and the coldest maximum 3 °F (−16.1 °C) on December 22 and 23 (twice on consecutive days) of 1990.

Climate data for Perryton, Texas, 1991–2020 normals, extremes 1965–2022
Month	Jan	Feb	Mar	Apr	May	Jun	Jul	Aug	Sep	Oct	Nov	Dec	Year
Record high °F (°C)	81 (27)	92 (33)	96 (36)	101 (38)	106 (41)	113 (45)	112 (44)	109 (43)	106 (41)	102 (39)	92 (33)	81 (27)	113 (45)
Mean maximum °F (°C)	70.3 (21.3)	76.7 (24.8)	89 (32)	90.0 (32.2)	95.6 (35.3)	100.6 (38.1)	103.3 (39.6)	100.8 (38.2)	97.6 (36.4)	90.7 (32.6)	79.2 (26.2)	70.7 (21.5)	105.3 (40.7)
Mean daily maximum °F (°C)	50.9 (10.5)	55.0 (12.8)	64.5 (18.1)	72.7 (22.6)	81.5 (27.5)	91.0 (32.8)	95.5 (35.3)	93.2 (34.0)	86.6 (30.3)	74.1 (23.4)	62.2 (16.8)	50.8 (10.4)	73.2 (22.9)
Daily mean °F (°C)	37.2 (2.9)	40.4 (4.7)	49.1 (9.5)	57.5 (14.2)	67.2 (19.6)	77.5 (25.3)	82.0 (27.8)	80.0 (26.7)	72.8 (22.7)	60.0 (15.6)	47.7 (8.7)	38.1 (3.4)	59.1 (15.1)
Mean daily minimum °F (°C)	23.5 (−4.7)	25.9 (−3.4)	33.8 (1.0)	42.3 (5.7)	53.0 (11.7)	63.9 (17.7)	68.4 (20.2)	66.8 (19.3)	58.9 (14.9)	45.8 (7.7)	33.2 (0.7)	25.4 (−3.7)	45.1 (7.3)
Mean minimum °F (°C)	5.7 (−14.6)	8.4 (−13.1)	13.7 (−10.2)	24.3 (−4.3)	35.4 (1.9)	49.5 (9.7)	56.9 (13.8)	55.3 (12.9)	41.0 (5.0)	27.4 (−2.6)	14.1 (−9.9)	6.6 (−14.1)	−0.3 (−17.9)
Record low °F (°C)	−17 (−27)	−15 (−26)	−5 (−21)	13 (−11)	23 (−5)	37 (3)	47 (8)	46 (8)	29 (−2)	11 (−12)	−4 (−20)	−12 (−24)	−17 (−27)
Average precipitation inches (mm)	0.69 (18)	0.58 (15)	1.51 (38)	1.90 (48)	2.80 (71)	3.20 (81)	3.48 (88)	2.96 (75)	1.86 (47)	2.04 (52)	0.83 (21)	0.97 (25)	22.82 (579)
Average snowfall inches (cm)	3.1 (7.9)	2.4 (6.1)	2.7 (6.9)	0.6 (1.5)	0.0 (0.0)	0.0 (0.0)	0.0 (0.0)	0.0 (0.0)	0.0 (0.0)	0.8 (2.0)	1.1 (2.8)	2.9 (7.4)	13.6 (34.6)
Average precipitation days (≥ 0.01 in)	2.5	3.0	4.9	5.7	6.8	7.3	6.7	6.8	5.0	5.0	3.5	3.2	60.4
Average snowy days (≥ 0.1 in)	1.3	1.2	1.0	0.2	0.0	0.0	0.0	0.0	0.0	0.3	0.6	1.2	5.8
Source 1: NOAA
Source 2: XMACIS2

== Demographics ==
Historical population
Census	Pop.	Note	%±
1930	2,824		—
1940	2,325		−17.7%
1950	4,417		90.0%
1960	7,903		78.9%
1970	7,810		−1.2%
1980	7,991		2.3%
1990	7,607		−4.8%
2000	7,774		2.2%
2010	8,802		13.2%
2020	8,492		−3.5%
U.S. Decennial Census

=== 2020 census ===
As of the 2020 census, there were 8,492 people, 3,015 households, and 2,161 families residing in the city. The median age was 33.0 years, 30.9% of residents were under the age of 18, and 11.4% of residents were 65 years of age or older; for every 100 females there were 101.0 males, and for every 100 females age 18 and over there were 99.6 males.

98.2% of residents lived in urban areas, while 1.8% lived in rural areas.

There were 3,015 households in Perryton, of which 42.4% had children under the age of 18 living in them. Of all households, 56.7% were married-couple households, 17.4% were households with a male householder and no spouse or partner present, and 21.5% were households with a female householder and no spouse or partner present. About 25.2% of all households were made up of individuals and 10.9% had someone living alone who was 65 years of age or older.

There were 3,582 housing units, of which 15.8% were vacant. The homeowner vacancy rate was 1.7% and the rental vacancy rate was 23.8%.

Racial composition as of the 2020 census
Race	Number	Percent
White	4,513	53.1%
Black or African American	20	0.2%
American Indian and Alaska Native	142	1.7%
Asian	26	0.3%
Native Hawaiian and Other Pacific Islander	2	0.0%
Some other race	2,216	26.1%
Two or more races	1,573	18.5%
Hispanic or Latino (of any race)	5,002	58.9%

=== 2000 census ===
At the 2000 census, 7,774 people, 2,785 households and 2,113 families were residing in the city. The population density was 1,753.2 people/sq mi (677.6/km^{2}). The 3,180 housing units had an average density of 717.2 per square mile (276.9/km^{2}). The racial makeup of the city was 85.23% White, 0.15% African American, 0.98% Native American, 0.40% Asian, 11.11% from other races, and 2.12% from two or more races. Hispanics or Latinos of any race were 34.13% of the population.

Of the 2,785 households, 42.3% had children under the age of 18 living with them, 62.6% were married couples living together, 8.7% had a female householder with no husband present, and 24.1% were not families. About 21.3% of all households were made up of individuals, and 9.5% had someone living alone who was 65 or older. The average household size was 2.77, and the average family size was 3.22.

Age distribution was 31.3% under 18, 8.7% from 18 to 24, 28.9% from 25 to 44, 19.8% from 45 to 64, and 11.3% who were 65 or older. The median age was 33 years. For every 100 females, there were 98.1 males. For every 100 females age 18 and over, there were 94.4 males.

The median household income was $37,363, and the median family income was $45,045. Males had a median income of $31,803 compared with $19,694 for females. The per capita income for the city was $16,431. About 9.7% of families and 13.2% of the population were below the poverty line, including 18.4% of those under age 18 and 10.2% of those age 65 or over.

== Education ==
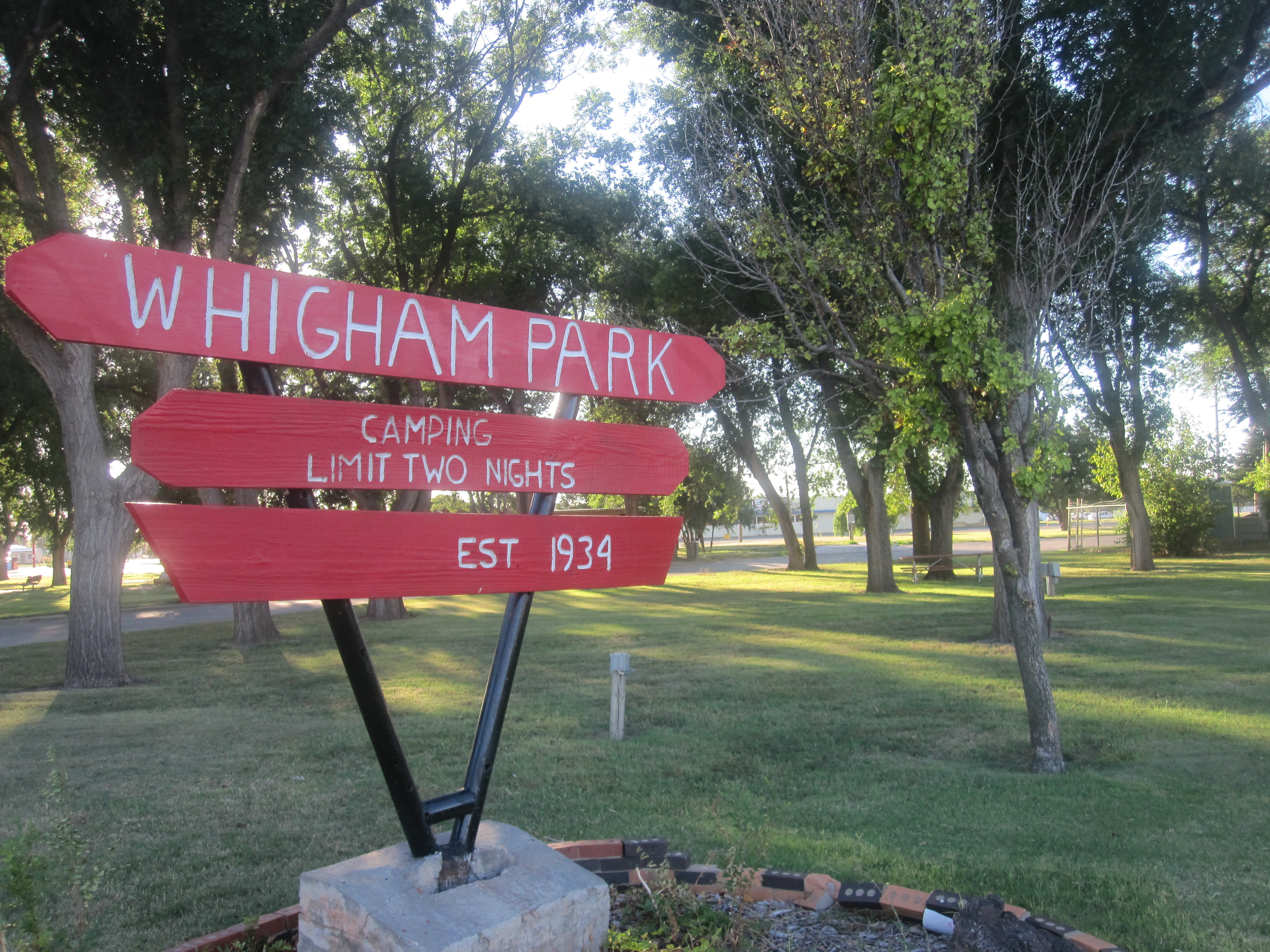
Whigham Park (established 1934)

Perryton and nearby rural areas are served by the Perryton Independent School District and Perryton High School.

The town has the Museum of the Plains, which has almost 30,000 square feet of exhibit space for over 10,000 artifacts, and also has 5 historic buildings spread over 4 acres.

== Transportation ==
Perryton is located at the intersection of U.S. Route 83 and Texas State Highway 15, and the town also has segments of Texas 143 and Texas 192.

Rail service through the town was eliminated when the line between Shattuck and Spearman, by then operated by the Southwestern Railroad, was abandoned in 2007.

The Perryton Ochiltree County Airport (KPYX; FAA Identifier PYX) is about 3 miles east-northeast of town center and features a 5701’ x 75’ asphalt runway.

== Notable people ==
- Caleb Campbell, NFL player
- Jeremy Campbell, Paralympic gold medalist (Pentathlon/Discus) in 2008, 2012, 2020, and 2024
- Ryan Culwell, singer-songwriter
- Jake Ellzey, member of the U.S. House of Representatives
- John Erickson, author of the Hank the Cowdog series
- Keith Flowers, NFL player
- Mickey Gates, member of the Arkansas House of Representatives
- Mike Hargrove, MLB player and manager
- Rex Linn, actor

== Gallery ==
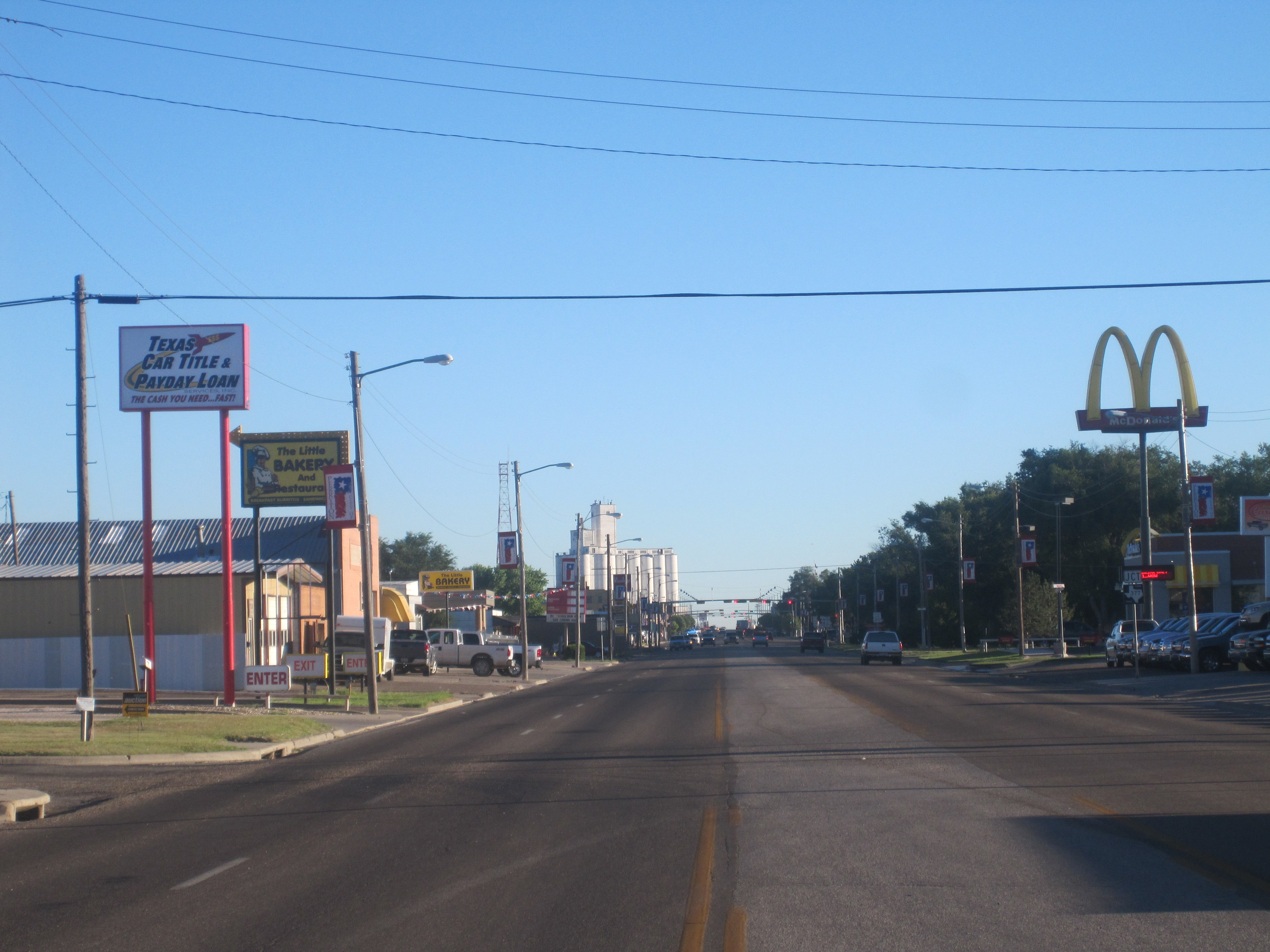
U.S. Highway 83 as it proceeds through downtown (2010)

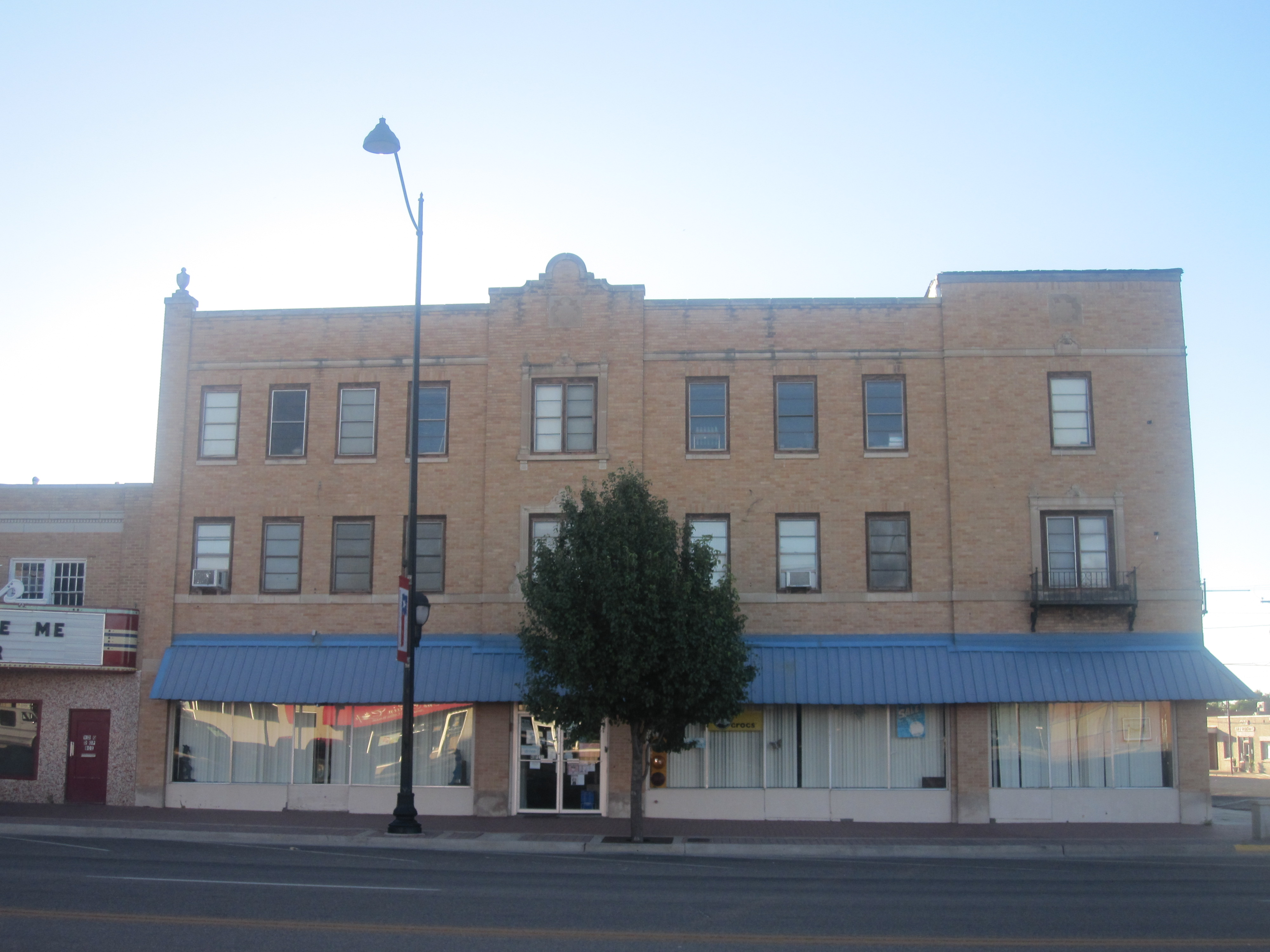
Former Hotel Perryton in downtown (2010)

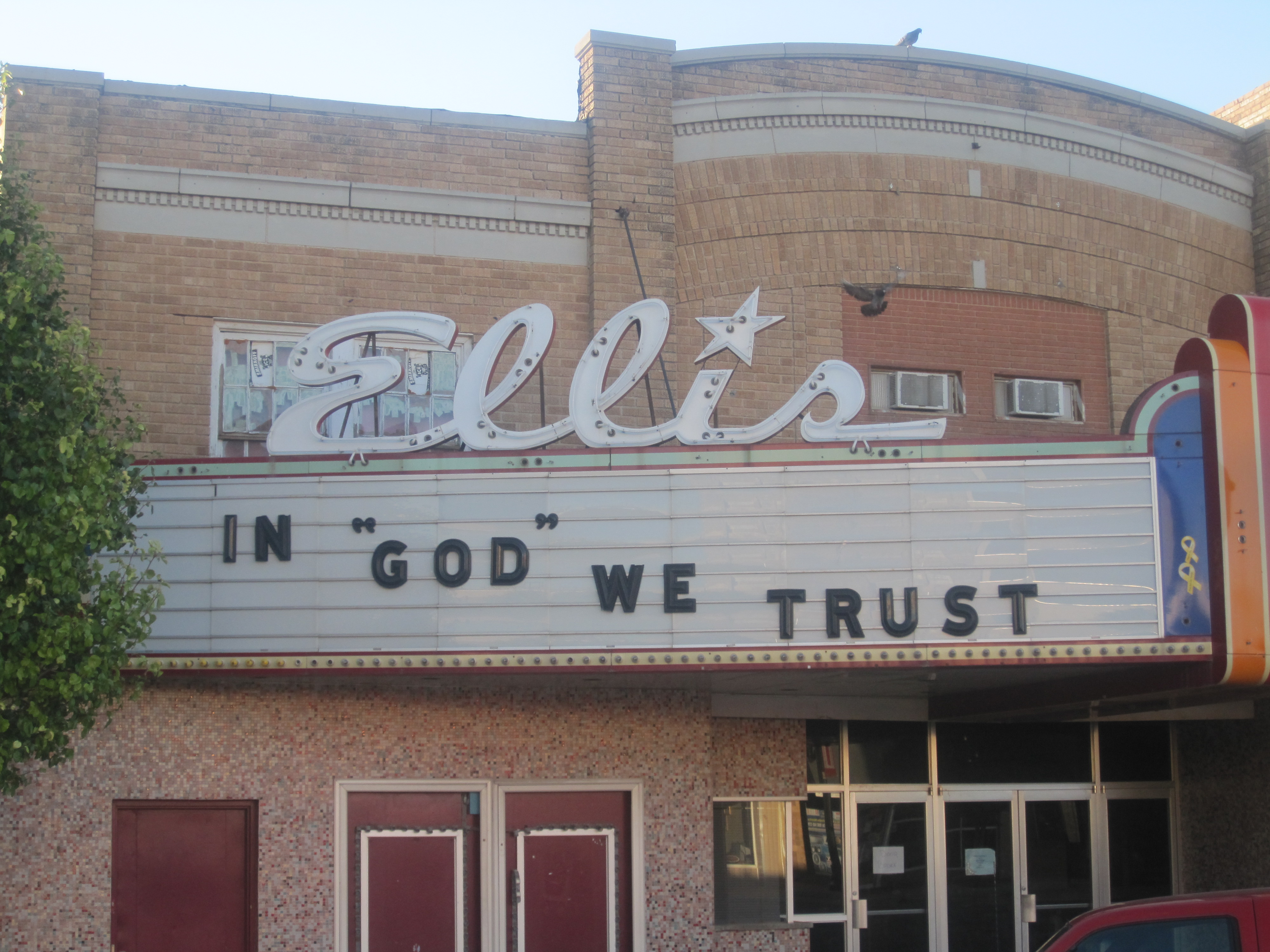
Ellis Theater in downtown (2010)

== See also ==
- Tornadoes of 2023
