= Texas State Highway 208 =

State highway in Texas, United States

State Highway 208
- SH 208; mainline in red, business route in blue

Route information
- Maintained by TxDOT
- Length: 145.194 mi (233.667 km) Excludes length of all route overlaps
- Existed: by 1935–present

Major junctions
- South end: US 87 in San Angelo
- I-20 in Colorado City; US 180 in Snyder; US 84 in Snyder; US 380 at Clairemont
- North end: SH 70 near Spur

Location
- Country: United States
- State: Texas

Highway system
- Highways in Texas; Interstate; US; State; Former; Toll; Loops; Spurs; FM/RM; Park; Rec
← SH 207	→ SH 209

State Highway 208 (SH 208) is a Texas state highway that runs from San Angelo to southeast of Spur.

== Route description ==
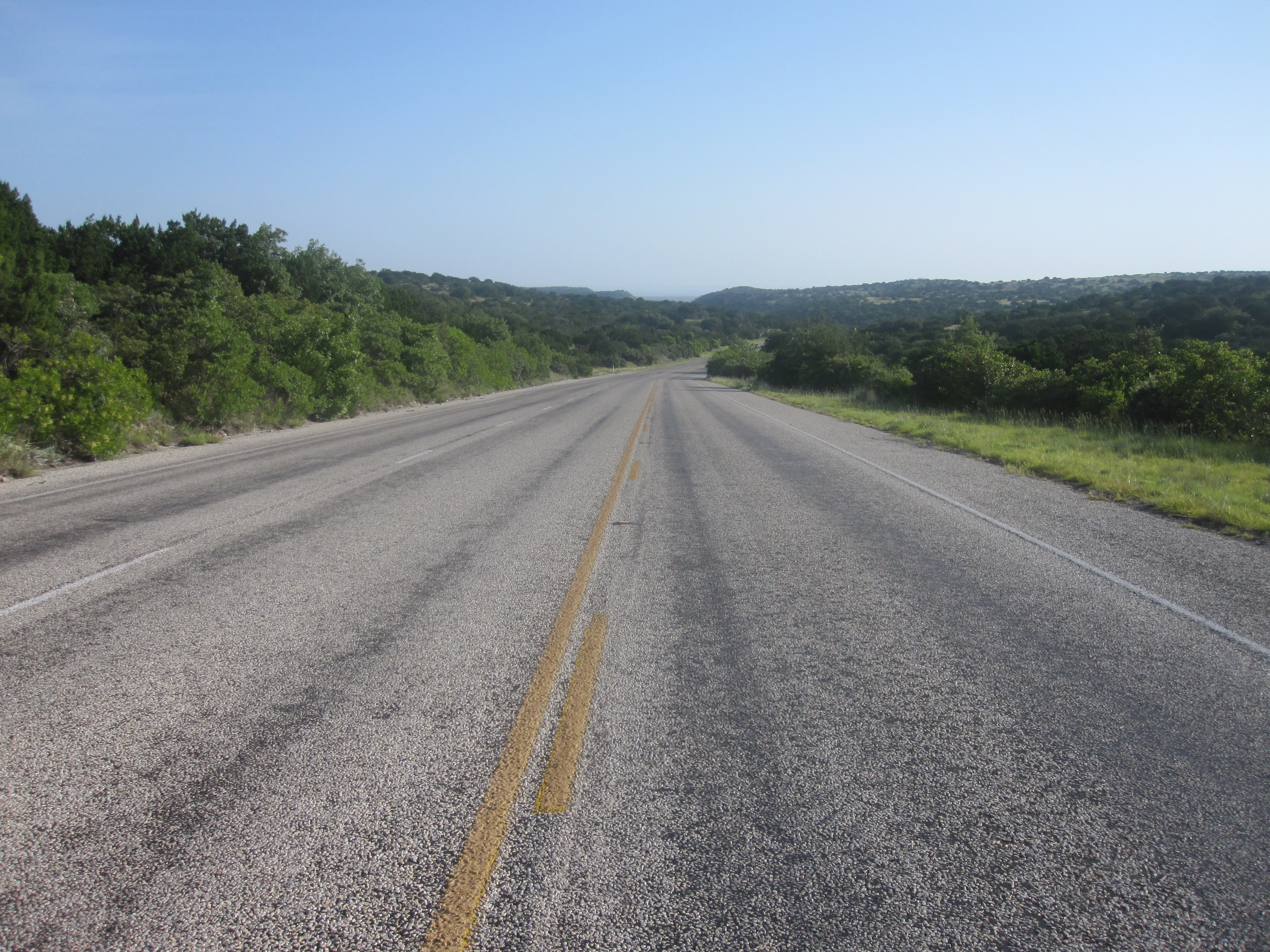
Texas Highway 208 north of San Angelo

SH 208 begins at an intersection with US 87 (North Bryant Boulevard) in San Angelo. The highway travels in a northeast and east direction along 19th Street for just over a mile before turning north onto Armstrong Street. After intersecting 29th Street, SH 208 travels through less developed areas of the city then leaves the San Angelo city limits just south of an intersection with FM 2105. Leaving San Angelo, the highway's route becomes rural and sparsely populated, traveling by several farms and ranches.

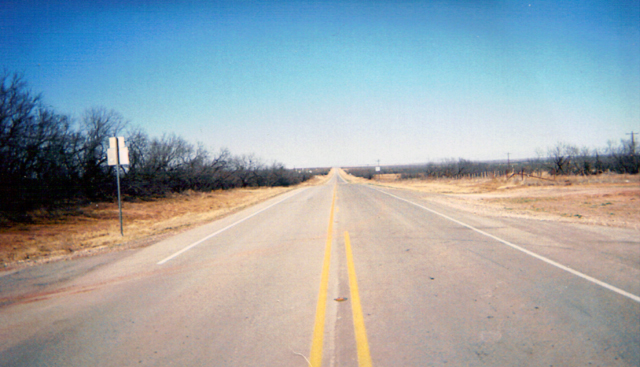
State Highway 208 in Clairemont, Texas

SH 208 crosses over the Colorado River then immediately enters the town of Robert Lee. In Robert Lee, the highway intersects Loop 229, SH 158, and Farm to Market Road 1904, with the latter providing access to the north end of the E.V. Spence Reservoir. Leaving Robert Lee, the route of SH 208 becomes rural again. In northern Coke County, the highway bypasses the unincorporated town of Silver, with RM 1672 providing direct access to the community. SH 208 crosses over the northeast section of the Champion Creek Reservoir then enters into Colorado City. The highway bypasses the city's downtown area with a business route, Bus. SH 208, providing access to the downtown and central parts of Colorado City. SH 208 has a brief overlap with I-20 before leaving Colorado City.

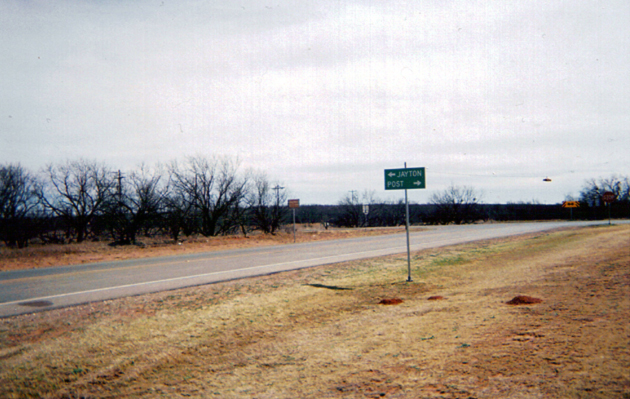
State Highway 208 at US 380

Leaving Colorado City, the highway's route becomes rural again until intersecting FM 2763. SH 208 enters the Snyder city limits and overlaps US 180 and Bus. US 84 through the town. The highway has an interchange with the US 84 bypass then leaves the town. North of Snyder, the highway's route becomes extremely rural and enters into Kent County. SH 208 crosses the Double Mountain Fork Brazos River then begins an overlap with US 380. The two highways enter the mostly abandoned ghost town of Clairemont, with SH 208 leaving US 380 here. A few miles north of Clairemont, the highway crosses the Salt Fork Brazos River and passes by many farms and ranches before ending at an intersection with SH 70 approximately 4.5 miles southeast of Spur.

== History ==
The route was originally designated on July 16, 1934, from San Angelo to Robert Lee. On June 16, 1936, SH 208 was extended north to Colorado City. The section from Robert Lee to Colorado City was dropped on March 26, 1942, but was reinstated on April 23, 1947, when it replaced RM 18. On February 23, 1956, the route was extended farther north to Snyder, replacing part of SH 101, and was signed (but not designated) to Spur along FM 1231 and FM 948. The extension to Spur was officially designated on August 29, 1990 to Spur, cancelling FM 1231 and FM 948.

FM 1231 was designated in 1949 as a route from US 84 at Snyder north 8.8 miles to a road intersection. In 1951, FM 1231 was extended north to the Kent County line. Later that year, FM 1231 was extended 3 miles further north. In 1952, FM 1231 was extended to US 380, replacing FM 1741 from US 380 south 6.1 miles. FM 1231 was cancelled in 1990 and transferred to SH 208.

== Junction list ==
County	Location	mi	km	Destinations	Notes
Tom Green	San Angelo	0.0	0.0	US 87 (Bryant Boulevard)	Southern terminus; road continues west as 19th Street
Tom Green		4.1	6.6	FM 2105 to US 87 / US 277	
Coke		22.9	36.9	FM 2662 east	
Coke		29.2	47.0	RM 2034 – Water Valley	
Coke	Robert Lee	30.3	48.8	Loop 229 west	
Coke	Robert Lee	30.6	49.2	SH 158 – Sterling City, Bronte	
Coke	Robert Lee	31.2	50.2	FM 1904 west – E.V. Spence Reservoir, Robert Lee Dam North End	
Coke		48.1	77.4	RM 1672 west – Silver	
Coke		49.5	79.7	RM 1672 south – Silver	
Mitchell		64.2	103.3	FM 644 north – Loraine	
Mitchell		68.0	109.4	FM 2319 east	
Mitchell	Colorado City	73.2	117.8	I-20 BL (Bus. SH 208 north) – Sweetwater	
Mitchell	Colorado City	74.3	119.6	I-20	I-20 exit 217
Mitchell	Colorado City	75.2	121.0	I-20 / Bus. SH 208 south to SH 163 – Big Spring	I-20 exit 216
Mitchell		75.9	122.1	FM 3525 south	
Mitchell		79.0	127.1	FM 1982 east	
Mitchell		81.0	130.4	FM 1808 west – Cuthbert	Access to Colorado City Airport
Scurry		86.8	139.7	FM 1606 – Ira	
Scurry		93.6	150.6	FM 2763 west – Western Texas College	Access to Cogdell Memorial Hospital
Scurry	Snyder	95.7	154.0	Bus. US 84 east – Roscoe, Sweetwater	South end of Bus. US 84 overlap
Scurry	Snyder	95.8	154.2	US 180 east – Lubbock, Roby, Post	South end of US 180 overlap
Scurry	Snyder	96.1	154.7	FM 1605 west	Access to Cogdell Memorial Hospital
Scurry	Snyder	98.5	158.5	US 180 west (25th Street) / SH 350 west (College Avenue)	North end of US 180 overlap
Scurry	Snyder	99.3	159.8	Bus. US 84 west	North end of Bus. US 84 overlap
Scurry	Snyder	99.6	160.3	FM 1673 east	
Scurry	Snyder	99.9	160.8	US 84 – Post, Roscoe	Interchange
Scurry		105.1	169.1	FM 1611 south	
Kent		129.9	209.1	US 380 west – Post	South end of US 380 overlap
Kent	Clairemont	134.7	216.8	US 380 east – Jayton	North end of US 380 overlap
Kent		144.5	232.6	FM 2320 – Jayton	
Kent		151.8	244.3	FM 643 east – Girard	
Dickens		157.1	252.8	SH 70 – Dickens, Jayton	Northern terminus; road continues unpaved as County Road 341
1.000 mi = 1.609 km; 1.000 km = 0.621 mi: Concurrency terminus

== Colorado City business route ==
Business State Highway 208
- Location: Colorado City
- Length: 1.607 mi (2.586 km) Excludes overlap with I-20 BL
- Existed: June 21, 1990–present

Business State Highway 208-B (Bus. SH 208-B) is a business route of SH 208 located in Colorado City. The highway was designated on June 21, 1990, with the mileage being transferred from the original Spur 471.

Bus. SH 208-B begins at the I-20 BL and SH 208 intersection in eastern Colorado City. Bus. SH 208-B overlaps I-20 BL with the two highways traveling in a western direction along Westpoint Avenue and 2nd Street. The overlap ends near the town's downtown area, with Bus. SH 208-B turning north onto Hickory Street. The highway travels through densely populated areas of the town before ending at I-20/SH 208 in northern Colorado City.

Junction list

The entire route is in Colorado City, Mitchell County.

mi	km	Destinations	Notes
0.0	0.0	I-20 BL east / SH 208 – Sweetwater, Robert Lee, Lake Champion	Southern terminus; south end of I-20 BL overlap
1.4	2.3	I-20 BL west to SH 163 – Big Spring, Sterling City	North end of I-20 BL overlap
3.0	4.8	I-20 / SH 208 – Big Spring, Sweetwater, Snyder	Northern terminus; I-20 exit 216
1.000 mi = 1.609 km; 1.000 km = 0.621 mi: Concurrency terminus

== See also ==
- List of state highways in Texas
