= Jayton High School (Texas) =

Location
- 700 Madison Ave. Jayton, Texas 76958-9998; United States

Information
- School type: Public high school
- School district: Jayton-Girard Independent School District
- Principal: Jamie Humphries
- Grades: PK-12
- Enrollment: 177 (2023-2024)
- Colors: Black & Old Gold
- Athletics conference: UIL Class A
- Mascot: Jaybird
- Yearbook: Jaybird
- Website: Jayton School

Jayton High School or Jayton School is a public high school located in the community of Jayton, Texas, in Kent County, United States and classified as a 1A school by the UIL. It is a part of the Jayton-Girard Independent School District located in central Kent County serving the communities of Jayton, Girard, and surrounding rural areas. In 2015, the school was rated "Met Standard" by the Texas Education Agency.

== Athletics ==
The Jayton Jaybirds compete in these sports -

Cross Country, 6-Man Football, Basketball, Golf, Tennis, Track, Baseball & Softball

=== State Titles ===
- Boys Basketball
  - 2024 (1A), 2025 (1A/D2), 2026 (1A/D2)
- Football -
  - 1984 (6M), 1985 (6M), 2024 (6M/D2), 2025 (6M/D2)

==== State Finalists ====
- Boys Basketball
  - 2023 (1A)
  - 2020 (1A)
  - 2019 (1A)

== Band ==
- Marching Band State Champions
  - 1997 (1A), 1999 (1A)

== See also ==
List of Six-man football stadiums in Texas
