= 2000 United States presidential election in Texas =

- November 7, 2000
- Turnout: 51.8% (of registered voters) ▼44.3% (of voting age population)

Nominee	George W. Bush	Al Gore
Party	Republican	Democratic
Home state	Texas	Tennessee
Running mate	Dick Cheney	Joe Lieberman
Electoral vote	32	0
Popular vote	3,799,639	2,433,746
Percentage	59.30%	37.98%

Bush
40–50%
50–60%
60–70%
70–80%
80–90%
90–100%
Gore
40–50%
50–60%
60–70%
70–80%
80–90%
90–100%
President before election
Bill Clinton
Democratic
Elected President
George W. Bush
Republican

The 2000 United States presidential election in Texas took place on November 7, 2000, and was part of the 2000 United States presidential election. State voters chose 32 representatives, or electors, to the Electoral College, who voted for president and vice president.

Texas was won by the Republican Party candidate, the state's incumbent governor, George W. Bush, by a 21.32% margin of victory. This was the first time since 1928 that Cottle County voted Republican. Many counties that Bill Clinton won in 1996 swung towards Bush in this election, in part due to the increasingly conservative bent of rural areas and Bush's favorite son status within the state. This election marked a realignment within the state, as most rural counties, particularly in West Texas and East Texas, shifted permanently towards Republicans at the presidential level.

A notable upset won by Bush was Travis County. A factor in Bush's win in the county was to the strong showing of left-wing third-party candidate Ralph Nader, who got 10.37% of the vote on the Green ticket, his best showing in any Texas county. Had Nader not run, Gore likely would have carried the county, albeit only narrowly.

== General election ==
=== Predictions ===
Source	Rating	As of
The Cook Political Report	Solid R	November 1, 2000

=== Polling ===
Poll source	Date(s)	Sample size	Margin of error	George W. Bush (R)	Al Gore (D)	Ralph Nader (G)	Other / undecided (Note: Calculated by taking the difference of 100% and all other listed candidates combined. For polls that do not report a figure for Nader, this includes his support.)
Harris Insights & Analytics	November 3, 2000	17,936	—	57%	39%	3%	1%
Mason-Dixon Polling & Strategy	November 3, 2000	625	—	64%	30%	—	6%
Scripps Howard	November 3, 2000	800	—	57%	27%	—	16%
Scripps Howard	October 20, 2000	1,000 (RV)	—	57%	27%	3%	13%

=== Results ===
2000 United States presidential election in Texas
Party	Candidate	Running mate	Popular vote		Electoral vote		Swing
Party	Candidate	Running mate	Count	%	Count	%	Swing
Republican	George W. Bush of Texas	Dick Cheney of Wyoming	3,799,639	59.30%	32	100.00%	▲10.54%
Democratic	Al Gore of Tennessee	Joe Lieberman of Connecticut	2,433,746	37.98%	0	0.00%	▼5.85%
Green	Ralph Nader of Connecticut	Winona LaDuke of Minnesota	137,994	2.15%	0	0.00%	▲2.06%
Reform	Pat Buchanan of Virginia	Ezola B. Foster of California	12,394	0.19%	0	0.00%	▼6.56%
Libertarian	Harry Browne of Tennessee	Art Olivier of California	23,160	0.36%	0	0.00%	▼0.00%
Total			6,406,933	100.00%	32	100.00%	

=== By county ===
County	George W. Bush Republican		Al Gore Democratic		Various candidates Other parties		Margin		Total
County	#	%	#	%	#	%	#	%	Total
Anderson	9,835	65.22%	5,041	33.43%	204	1.35%	4,794	31.79%	15,080
Andrews	3,091	76.81%	876	21.77%	57	1.42%	2,215	55.04%	4,024
Angelina	16,648	61.72%	9,957	36.91%	369	1.37%	6,691	24.81%	26,974
Aransas	5,390	65.36%	2,637	31.98%	220	2.67%	2,753	33.38%	8,247
Archer	2,951	73.83%	993	24.84%	53	1.33%	1,958	48.99%	3,997
Armstrong	772	82.30%	150	15.99%	16	1.71%	622	66.31%	938
Atascosa	6,231	57.98%	4,322	40.22%	193	1.80%	1,909	17.76%	10,746
Austin	6,661	72.19%	2,407	26.09%	159	1.72%	4,254	46.10%	9,227
Bailey	1,589	76.03%	488	23.35%	13	0.62%	1,101	52.68%	2,090
Bandera	5,613	77.18%	1,426	19.61%	234	3.22%	4,187	57.57%	7,273
Bastrop	10,310	56.31%	6,973	38.09%	1,025	5.60%	3,337	18.22%	18,308
Baylor	1,285	64.77%	663	33.42%	36	1.81%	622	31.35%	1,984
Bee	4,429	53.17%	3,795	45.56%	106	1.27%	634	7.61%	8,330
Bell	41,208	65.11%	21,011	33.20%	1,072	1.69%	20,197	31.91%	63,291
Bexar	215,613	52.24%	185,158	44.86%	11,955	2.90%	30,455	7.38%	412,726
Blanco	2,777	73.72%	811	21.53%	179	4.75%	1,966	52.19%	3,767
Borden	283	80.17%	62	17.56%	8	2.27%	221	62.61%	353
Bosque	4,745	70.09%	1,930	28.51%	95	1.40%	2,815	41.58%	6,770
Bowie	18,325	60.44%	11,662	38.46%	333	1.10%	6,663	21.98%	30,320
Brazoria	53,445	66.79%	24,883	31.10%	1,691	2.11%	28,562	35.69%	80,019
Brazos	32,864	70.01%	12,359	26.33%	1,718	3.66%	20,505	43.68%	46,941
Brewster	1,867	52.15%	1,349	37.68%	364	10.17%	518	14.47%	3,580
Briscoe	544	70.47%	224	29.02%	4	0.52%	320	41.45%	772
Brooks	556	22.87%	1,854	76.26%	21	0.86%	-1,298	-53.39%	2,431
Brown	9,609	74.37%	3,138	24.29%	173	1.34%	6,471	50.08%	12,920
Burleson	3,542	60.38%	2,235	38.10%	89	1.52%	1,307	22.28%	5,866
Burnet	9,286	70.18%	3,557	26.88%	389	2.94%	5,729	43.30%	13,232
Caldwell	5,216	55.34%	3,872	41.08%	337	3.58%	1,344	14.26%	9,425
Calhoun	3,724	56.74%	2,766	42.15%	73	1.11%	958	14.59%	6,563
Callahan	3,656	74.67%	1,174	23.98%	66	1.35%	2,482	50.69%	4,896
Cameron	27,800	44.80%	33,214	53.52%	1,043	1.68%	-5,414	-8.72%	62,057
Camp	2,121	56.05%	1,625	42.94%	38	1.00%	496	13.11%	3,784
Carson	2,216	80.82%	480	17.51%	46	1.68%	1,736	63.31%	2,742
Cass	6,295	57.13%	4,618	41.91%	106	0.96%	1,677	15.22%	11,019
Castro	1,607	68.27%	727	30.88%	20	0.85%	880	37.39%	2,354
Chambers	6,769	69.03%	2,888	29.45%	149	1.52%	3,881	39.58%	9,806
Cherokee	9,599	66.03%	4,755	32.71%	183	1.26%	4,844	33.32%	14,537
Childress	1,506	70.84%	602	28.32%	18	0.85%	904	42.52%	2,126
Clay	3,112	67.11%	1,460	31.49%	65	1.40%	1,652	35.62%	4,637
Cochran	807	68.92%	344	29.38%	20	1.71%	463	39.54%	1,171
Coke	1,137	75.05%	355	23.43%	23	1.52%	782	51.62%	1,515
Coleman	2,687	75.10%	853	23.84%	38	1.06%	1,834	51.26%	3,578
Collin	128,179	73.07%	42,884	24.45%	4,357	2.48%	85,295	48.62%	175,420
Collingsworth	974	68.83%	429	30.32%	12	0.85%	545	38.51%	1,415
Colorado	4,913	67.77%	2,229	30.75%	107	1.48%	2,684	37.02%	7,249
Comal	24,599	75.12%	7,131	21.78%	1,018	3.11%	17,468	53.34%	32,748
Comanche	3,334	66.39%	1,636	32.58%	52	1.04%	1,698	33.81%	5,022
Concho	818	74.16%	268	24.30%	17	1.54%	550	49.86%	1,103
Cooke	10,128	75.19%	3,153	23.41%	188	1.40%	6,975	51.78%	13,469
Coryell	10,321	68.41%	4,493	29.78%	273	1.81%	5,828	38.63%	15,087
Cottle	502	66.31%	241	31.84%	14	1.85%	261	34.47%	757
Crane	1,246	75.33%	387	23.40%	21	1.27%	859	51.93%	1,654
Crockett	924	66.09%	467	33.40%	7	0.50%	457	32.69%	1,398
Crosby	1,270	63.44%	705	35.21%	27	1.35%	565	28.23%	2,002
Culberson	413	40.81%	577	57.02%	22	2.17%	-164	-16.21%	1,012
Dallam	1,385	79.42%	341	19.55%	18	1.03%	1,044	59.87%	1,744
Dallas	322,345	52.58%	275,308	44.91%	15,386	2.51%	47,037	7.67%	613,039
Dawson	3,337	68.96%	1,463	30.23%	39	0.81%	1,874	38.73%	4,839
Deaf Smith	3,687	73.98%	1,240	24.88%	57	1.14%	2,447	49.10%	4,984
Delta	1,143	60.16%	726	38.21%	31	1.63%	417	21.95%	1,900
Denton	102,171	69.60%	40,144	27.35%	4,475	3.05%	62,027	42.25%	146,790
DeWitt	4,541	73.44%	1,570	25.39%	72	1.16%	2,971	48.05%	6,183
Dickens	589	66.86%	284	32.24%	8	0.91%	305	34.62%	881
Dimmit	1,032	27.50%	2,678	71.36%	43	1.15%	-1,646	-43.86%	3,753
Donley	1,333	77.55%	360	20.94%	26	1.51%	973	56.61%	1,719
Duval	1,010	20.08%	3,990	79.32%	30	0.60%	-2,980	-59.24%	5,030
Eastland	4,531	70.64%	1,774	27.66%	109	1.70%	2,757	42.98%	6,414
Ector	22,893	69.58%	9,425	28.65%	583	1.77%	13,468	40.93%	32,901
Edwards	663	70.76%	261	27.85%	13	1.39%	402	42.91%	937
El Paso	57,574	39.69%	83,848	57.81%	3,620	2.50%	-26,274	-18.12%	145,042
Ellis	26,091	69.94%	10,629	28.49%	587	1.57%	15,462	41.45%	37,307
Erath	8,126	73.11%	2,804	25.23%	185	1.66%	5,322	47.88%	11,115
Falls	3,239	56.68%	2,417	42.29%	59	1.03%	822	14.39%	5,715
Fannin	6,074	58.74%	4,102	39.67%	164	1.59%	1,972	19.07%	10,340
Fayette	6,658	70.93%	2,542	27.08%	187	1.99%	4,116	43.85%	9,387
Fisher	968	51.71%	884	47.22%	20	1.07%	84	4.49%	1,872
Floyd	1,830	75.62%	580	23.97%	10	0.41%	1,250	51.65%	2,420
Foard	286	51.44%	263	47.30%	7	1.26%	23	4.14%	556
Fort Bend	73,567	59.56%	47,569	38.51%	2,373	1.92%	25,998	21.05%	123,509
Franklin	2,420	69.70%	1,018	29.32%	34	0.98%	1,402	40.38%	3,472
Freestone	4,247	63.95%	2,316	34.87%	78	1.17%	1,931	29.08%	6,641
Frio	1,774	42.97%	2,317	56.13%	37	0.90%	-543	-13.16%	4,128
Gaines	2,691	77.80%	723	20.90%	45	1.30%	1,968	56.90%	3,459
Galveston	50,397	54.20%	40,020	43.04%	2,566	2.76%	10,377	11.16%	92,983
Garza	1,302	73.56%	454	25.65%	14	0.79%	848	47.91%	1,770
Gillespie	8,096	81.61%	1,511	15.23%	313	3.16%	6,585	66.38%	9,920
Glasscock	528	92.47%	39	6.83%	4	0.70%	489	85.64%	571
Goliad	2,108	62.15%	1,233	36.35%	51	1.50%	875	25.80%	3,392
Gonzales	4,092	67.42%	1,877	30.93%	100	1.65%	2,215	36.49%	6,069
Gray	6,732	82.25%	1,376	16.81%	77	0.94%	5,356	65.44%	8,185
Grayson	25,596	64.09%	13,647	34.17%	697	1.75%	11,949	29.92%	39,940
Gregg	26,739	69.57%	11,244	29.26%	450	1.17%	15,495	40.31%	38,433
Grimes	4,197	61.70%	2,450	36.02%	155	2.28%	1,747	25.68%	6,802
Guadalupe	21,499	70.33%	8,311	27.19%	757	2.48%	13,188	43.14%	30,567
Hale	6,868	75.39%	2,158	23.69%	84	0.92%	4,710	51.70%	9,110
Hall	966	66.80%	472	32.64%	8	0.55%	494	34.16%	1,446
Hamilton	2,447	72.48%	878	26.01%	51	1.51%	1,569	46.47%	3,376
Hansford	1,874	89.75%	198	9.48%	16	0.77%	1,676	80.27%	2,088
Hardeman	976	62.68%	566	36.35%	15	0.96%	410	26.33%	1,557
Hardin	11,962	67.07%	5,595	31.37%	279	1.56%	6,367	35.70%	17,836
Harris	529,159	54.28%	418,267	42.91%	27,396	2.81%	110,892	11.37%	974,822
Harrison	13,834	60.23%	8,878	38.65%	258	1.12%	4,956	21.58%	22,970
Hartley	1,645	80.99%	359	17.68%	27	1.33%	1,286	63.31%	2,031
Haskell	1,488	50.84%	1,401	47.86%	38	1.30%	87	2.98%	2,927
Hays	20,170	58.78%	11,387	33.18%	2,760	8.04%	8,783	25.60%	34,317
Hemphill	1,203	81.61%	251	17.03%	20	1.36%	952	64.58%	1,474
Henderson	16,607	64.80%	8,704	33.96%	316	1.23%	7,903	30.84%	25,627
Hidalgo	38,301	37.90%	61,390	60.75%	1,359	1.34%	-23,089	-22.85%	101,150
Hill	7,054	65.71%	3,524	32.83%	157	1.46%	3,530	32.88%	10,735
Hockley	5,250	77.84%	1,419	21.04%	76	1.13%	3,831	56.80%	6,745
Hood	12,429	71.00%	4,704	26.87%	372	2.13%	7,725	44.13%	17,505
Hopkins	7,076	64.86%	3,692	33.84%	142	1.30%	3,384	31.02%	10,910
Houston	5,308	64.45%	2,833	34.40%	95	1.15%	2,475	30.05%	8,236
Howard	6,668	69.84%	2,744	28.74%	136	1.42%	3,924	41.10%	9,548
Hudspeth	514	55.75%	380	41.21%	28	3.04%	134	14.54%	922
Hunt	16,177	66.12%	7,857	32.11%	432	1.77%	8,320	34.01%	24,466
Hutchinson	7,443	79.60%	1,796	19.21%	112	1.20%	5,647	60.39%	9,351
Irion	624	78.69%	162	20.43%	7	0.88%	462	58.26%	793
Jack	2,107	70.85%	822	27.64%	45	1.51%	1,285	43.21%	2,974
Jackson	3,365	69.30%	1,446	29.78%	45	0.93%	1,919	21.95%	4,856
Jasper	7,071	60.22%	4,533	38.61%	138	1.18%	2,538	21.61%	11,742
Jeff Davis	708	66.79%	283	26.70%	69	6.51%	425	40.09%	1,060
Jefferson	40,320	46.39%	45,409	52.25%	1,180	1.36%	-5,089	-5.86%	86,909
Jim Hogg	623	28.88%	1,512	70.10%	22	1.02%	-889	-41.22%	2,157
Jim Wells	4,498	37.41%	7,418	61.70%	107	0.89%	-2,920	-24.29%	12,023
Johnson	26,202	67.66%	11,778	30.41%	746	1.93%	14,424	37.25%	38,726
Jones	4,080	67.46%	1,899	31.40%	69	1.14%	2,181	36.06%	6,048
Karnes	2,638	61.23%	1,617	37.53%	53	1.23%	1,021	23.70%	4,308
Kaufman	15,290	66.30%	7,455	32.32%	318	1.38%	7,835	33.98%	23,063
Kendall	8,788	79.36%	1,901	17.17%	384	3.47%	6,887	62.19%	11,073
Kenedy	106	46.49%	119	52.19%	3	1.32%	-13	-5.70%	228
Kent	346	64.55%	185	34.51%	5	0.93%	161	30.04%	536
Kerr	14,637	76.12%	4,002	20.81%	589	3.06%	10,635	55.31%	19,228
Kimble	1,313	78.81%	328	19.69%	25	1.50%	985	59.12%	1,666
King	120	87.59%	14	10.22%	3	2.19%	106	77.37%	137
Kinney	932	64.54%	486	33.66%	26	1.80%	446	30.88%	1,444
Kleberg	4,526	49.23%	4,481	48.74%	187	2.03%	45	0.49%	9,194
Knox	947	60.09%	617	39.15%	12	0.76%	330	20.94%	1,576
La Salle	731	36.30%	1,266	62.86%	17	0.84%	-535	-26.56%	2,014
Lamar	9,775	63.35%	5,553	35.99%	102	0.66%	4,222	27.36%	15,430
Lamb	3,451	75.05%	1,114	24.23%	33	0.72%	2,337	50.82%	4,598
Lampasas	4,526	72.84%	1,569	25.25%	119	1.92%	2,957	47.59%	6,214
Lavaca	5,288	70.08%	2,171	28.77%	87	1.15%	3,117	41.31%	7,546
Lee	3,699	66.82%	1,733	31.30%	104	1.88%	1,966	35.52%	5,536
Leon	4,362	68.95%	1,893	29.92%	71	1.12%	2,469	39.03%	6,326
Liberty	12,458	62.05%	7,311	36.41%	308	1.53%	5,147	25.64%	20,077
Limestone	4,212	59.53%	2,768	39.12%	95	1.34%	1,444	20.41%	7,075
Lipscomb	1,072	82.84%	206	15.92%	16	1.24%	866	66.92%	1,294
Live Oak	2,828	70.63%	1,114	27.82%	62	1.55%	1,714	42.81%	4,004
Llano	6,295	72.97%	2,143	24.84%	189	2.19%	4,152	48.13%	8,627
Loving	124	79.49%	29	18.59%	3	1.92%	95	60.90%	156
Lubbock	56,054	73.75%	18,469	24.30%	1,485	1.95%	37,585	49.45%	76,008
Lynn	1,507	72.31%	562	26.97%	15	0.72%	945	45.34%	2,084
Madison	2,333	64.39%	1,241	34.25%	49	1.35%	1,092	30.14%	3,623
Marion	2,039	51.88%	1,852	47.12%	39	0.99%	187	4.76%	3,930
Martin	1,520	77.99%	415	21.29%	14	0.72%	1,105	56.70%	1,949
Mason	1,352	75.07%	417	23.15%	32	1.78%	935	51.92%	1,801
Matagorda	7,584	60.87%	4,696	37.69%	179	1.44%	2,888	23.18%	12,459
Maverick	3,143	34.06%	5,995	64.96%	91	0.99%	-2,852	-30.90%	9,229
McCulloch	2,084	71.37%	794	27.19%	42	1.44%	1,290	44.18%	2,920
McLennan	43,955	63.90%	23,462	34.11%	1,372	1.99%	20,493	29.79%	68,789
McMullen	358	81.55%	77	17.54%	4	0.91%	281	64.01%	439
Medina	8,590	66.73%	4,025	31.27%	258	2.00%	4,565	35.46%	12,873
Menard	642	64.85%	334	33.74%	14	1.41%	308	31.11%	990
Midland	31,514	79.30%	7,534	18.96%	692	1.74%	23,980	60.34%	39,740
Milam	4,706	56.91%	3,429	41.47%	134	1.62%	1,277	15.44%	8,269
Mills	1,738	75.11%	548	23.68%	28	1.21%	1,190	51.43%	2,314
Mitchell	1,708	66.36%	837	32.52%	29	1.13%	871	33.84%	2,574
Montague	4,951	67.54%	2,256	30.78%	123	1.68%	2,695	36.76%	7,330
Montgomery	80,600	75.89%	23,286	21.92%	2,327	2.19%	57,314	53.97%	106,213
Moore	4,201	79.41%	1,040	19.66%	49	0.93%	3,161	59.75%	5,290
Morris	2,381	48.70%	2,455	50.21%	53	1.08%	-74	-1.51%	4,889
Motley	514	80.06%	118	18.38%	10	1.56%	396	61.68%	642
Nacogdoches	13,145	66.39%	6,204	31.33%	450	2.27%	6,941	35.06%	19,799
Navarro	8,358	60.17%	5,366	38.63%	166	1.20%	2,992	21.54%	13,890
Newton	2,423	48.56%	2,503	50.16%	64	1.28%	-80	-1.60%	4,990
Nolan	3,337	62.82%	1,874	35.28%	101	1.90%	1,463	27.54%	5,312
Nueces	49,906	51.28%	45,349	46.59%	2,071	2.13%	4,557	4.69%	97,326
Ochiltree	2,687	90.72%	251	8.47%	24	0.81%	2,436	82.25%	2,962
Oldham	659	85.14%	108	13.95%	7	0.91%	551	71.19%	774
Orange	17,325	58.42%	11,887	40.09%	442	1.49%	5,438	18.33%	29,654
Palo Pinto	5,690	62.40%	3,263	35.79%	165	1.81%	2,427	26.61%	9,118
Panola	5,975	65.85%	3,011	33.18%	88	0.97%	2,964	32.67%	9,074
Parker	23,651	71.18%	8,878	26.72%	696	2.09%	14,773	44.46%	33,225
Parmer	2,274	82.87%	447	16.29%	23	0.84%	1,827	66.58%	2,744
Pecos	2,700	62.75%	1,539	35.77%	64	1.49%	1,161	26.98%	4,303
Polk	11,746	61.84%	6,877	36.21%	371	1.95%	4,869	25.63%	18,994
Potter	17,629	69.47%	7,242	28.54%	505	1.99%	10,387	40.93%	25,376
Presidio	618	35.17%	1,064	60.56%	75	4.27%	-446	-25.39%	1,757
Rains	2,049	61.48%	1,225	36.75%	59	1.77%	824	24.73%	3,333
Randall	33,921	81.17%	7,209	17.25%	660	1.58%	26,712	63.92%	41,790
Reagan	959	76.41%	282	22.47%	14	1.12%	677	53.94%	1,255
Real	1,146	76.91%	316	21.21%	28	1.88%	830	55.70%	1,490
Red River	2,941	56.54%	2,219	42.66%	42	0.81%	722	13.88%	5,202
Reeves	1,273	40.08%	1,872	58.94%	31	0.98%	-599	-18.86%	3,176
Refugio	1,721	58.92%	1,172	40.12%	28	0.96%	549	18.80%	2,921
Roberts	472	85.97%	72	13.11%	5	0.91%	400	72.86%	549
Robertson	3,007	47.21%	3,283	51.55%	79	1.24%	-276	-4.34%	6,369
Rockwall	13,666	77.42%	3,642	20.63%	344	1.95%	10,024	56.79%	17,652
Runnels	3,020	74.64%	969	23.95%	57	1.41%	2,051	50.69%	4,046
Rusk	11,611	69.81%	4,841	29.10%	181	1.09%	6,770	40.71%	16,633
Sabine	2,764	60.20%	1,753	38.18%	74	1.61%	1,011	22.02%	4,591
San Augustine	2,116	55.61%	1,636	43.00%	53	1.39%	480	12.61%	3,805
San Jacinto	4,623	59.93%	2,946	38.19%	145	1.88%	1,677	21.74%	7,714
San Patricio	10,599	56.68%	7,840	41.93%	260	1.39%	2,759	14.75%	18,699
San Saba	1,691	72.48%	618	26.49%	24	1.03%	1,073	45.99%	2,333
Schleicher	826	70.42%	338	28.82%	9	0.77%	488	41.60%	1,173
Scurry	4,060	76.23%	1,193	22.40%	73	1.37%	2,867	53.83%	5,326
Shackelford	1,066	79.14%	264	19.60%	17	1.26%	802	59.54%	1,347
Shelby	5,692	63.21%	3,227	35.84%	86	0.96%	2,465	27.37%	9,005
Sherman	998	85.81%	144	12.38%	21	1.81%	854	73.43%	1,163
Smith	43,320	71.46%	16,470	27.17%	834	1.38%	26,850	44.29%	60,624
Somervell	2,120	72.65%	752	25.77%	46	1.58%	1,368	46.88%	2,918
Starr	1,911	22.58%	6,505	76.85%	48	0.57%	-4,594	-54.27%	8,464
Stephens	2,425	73.69%	811	24.64%	55	1.67%	1,614	49.05%	3,291
Sterling	520	78.91%	132	20.03%	7	1.06%	388	58.88%	659
Stonewall	496	62.08%	294	36.80%	9	1.13%	202	25.28%	799
Sutton	1,063	69.03%	468	30.39%	9	0.58%	595	38.64%	1,540
Swisher	1,612	64.45%	856	34.23%	33	1.32%	756	30.22%	2,501
Tarrant	286,921	60.74%	173,758	36.78%	11,710	2.48%	113,163	23.96%	472,389
Taylor	31,701	73.69%	10,504	24.42%	815	1.89%	21,197	49.27%	43,020
Terrell	243	50.94%	219	45.91%	15	3.14%	24	5.03%	477
Terry	2,910	71.78%	1,108	27.33%	36	0.89%	1,802	44.45%	4,054
Throckmorton	608	72.21%	228	27.08%	6	0.71%	380	45.13%	842
Titus	4,995	61.64%	3,008	37.12%	100	1.23%	1,987	24.52%	8,103
Tom Green	24,733	71.43%	9,288	26.82%	605	1.75%	15,445	44.61%	34,626
Travis	141,235	46.88%	125,526	41.67%	34,502	11.45%	15,709	5.21%	301,263
Trinity	3,093	58.39%	2,142	40.44%	62	1.17%	951	17.95%	5,297
Tyler	4,236	59.53%	2,775	39.00%	105	1.48%	1,461	20.53%	7,116
Upshur	8,448	65.96%	4,180	32.64%	180	1.41%	4,268	33.32%	12,808
Upton	982	77.14%	266	20.90%	25	1.96%	716	56.24%	1,273
Uvalde	4,855	57.66%	3,436	40.81%	129	1.53%	1,419	16.85%	8,420
Val Verde	6,223	54.24%	5,056	44.06%	195	1.70%	1,167	10.18%	11,474
Van Zandt	12,383	69.21%	5,245	29.32%	263	1.47%	7,138	39.89%	17,891
Victoria	18,787	68.55%	8,176	29.83%	445	1.62%	10,611	38.72%	27,408
Walker	9,076	63.14%	4,943	34.39%	355	2.47%	4,133	28.75%	14,374
Waller	5,686	52.37%	5,046	46.47%	126	1.16%	640	5.90%	10,858
Ward	2,534	65.41%	1,256	32.42%	84	2.17%	1,278	32.99%	3,874
Washington	8,645	73.21%	2,996	25.37%	168	1.42%	5,649	47.84%	11,809
Webb	13,076	41.42%	18,120	57.39%	375	1.19%	-5,044	-15.97%	31,571
Wharton	8,455	62.97%	4,838	36.03%	133	0.99%	3,617	26.94%	13,426
Wheeler	1,787	74.80%	579	24.24%	23	0.96%	1,208	50.56%	2,389
Wichita	27,802	65.09%	14,108	33.03%	803	1.88%	13,694	32.06%	42,713
Wilbarger	3,138	68.56%	1,356	29.63%	83	1.81%	1,782	38.93%	4,577
Willacy	1,789	35.34%	3,218	63.57%	55	1.09%	-1,429	-28.23%	5,062
Williamson	65,041	67.80%	26,591	27.72%	4,303	4.49%	38,450	40.08%	95,935
Wilson	7,509	64.19%	3,997	34.17%	192	1.64%	3,512	30.02%	11,698
Winkler	1,468	71.86%	556	27.21%	19	0.93%	912	44.65%	2,043
Wise	11,234	68.63%	4,830	29.51%	304	1.86%	6,404	39.12%	16,368
Wood	9,810	70.66%	3,893	28.04%	181	1.30%	5,917	42.62%	13,884
Yoakum	1,911	77.53%	531	21.54%	23	0.93%	1,380	55.99%	2,465
Young	5,022	72.22%	1,843	26.50%	89	1.28%	3,179	45.72%	6,954
Zapata	953	36.43%	1,638	62.61%	25	0.96%	-685	-26.18%	2,616
Zavala	751	22.15%	2,616	77.15%	24	0.71%	-1,865	-55.00%	3,391
Totals	3,799,639	59.30%	2,433,746	37.98%	174,252	2.72%	1,365,893	21.32%	6,407,637

==== Counties that flipped from Democratic to Republican ====
- Atascosa (largest city: Pleasanton)
- Bastrop (largest city: Elgin)
- Baylor (largest city: Seymour)
- Bee (largest city: Beeville)
- Bexar (largest city: San Antonio)
- Bowie (largest city: Texarkana)
- Brewster (largest city: Alpine)
- Burleson (largest city: Caldwell)
- Caldwell (largest city: Lockhart)
- Camp (largest city: Pittsburg)
- Cass (largest city: Atlanta)
- Comanche (largest city: Comanche)
- Cottle (largest city: Paducah)
- Crosby (largest city: Crosbyton)
- Delta (largest city: Cooper)
- Dickens (largest city: Spur)
- Falls (largest city: Marlin)
- Fannin (largest city: Bonham)
- Fisher (largest city: Rotan)
- Foard (largest city: Crowell)
- Galveston (largest city: Galveston)
- Grimes (largest city: Navasota)
- Hall (largest city: Memphis)
- Hardeman (largest city: Quanah)
- Harrison (largest city: Marshall)
- Haskell (largest city: Haskell)
- Hopkins (largest city: Sulphur Springs)
- Hudspeth (largest city: Fort Hancock)
- Jasper (largest city: Jasper)
- Jones (largest city: Abilene)
- Karnes (largest city: Kenedy)
- Kent (largest city: Jayton)
- Kleberg (largest city: Kingsville)
- Knox (largest city: Munday)
- Limestone (largest city: Mexia)
- Marion (largest city: Jefferson)
- Menard (largest city: Menard)
- Milam (largest city: Rockdale)
- Mitchell (largest city: Colorado City)
- Navarro (largest city: Corsicana)
- Nolan (largest city: Sweetwater)
- Nueces (largest city: Corpus Christi)
- Orange (largest city: Orange)
- Palo Pinto (largest city: Mineral Wells)
- Panola (largest city: Carthage)
- Pecos (largest city: Fort Stockton)
- Rains (largest city: Emory)
- Red River (largest city: Clarksville)
- Refugio (largest city: Refugio)
- Sabine (largest city: Milam)
- San Augustine (largest city: San Augustine)
- San Patricio (largest city: Portland)
- Shelby (largest city: Center)
- Stonewall (largest city: Aspermont)
- Swisher (largest city: Tulia)
- Terrell (largest city: Sanderson)
- Titus (largest city: Mount Pleasant)
- Travis (largest city: Austin)
- Trinity (largest city: Trinity)
- Tyler (largest city: Woodville)
- Val Verde (largest city: Del Rio)
- Waller (largest city: Hempstead)
- Ward (largest city: Monahans)

=== By congressional district ===
Bush won 20 of 30 congressional districts, including seven held by Democrats.

District	Bush	Gore	Representative
1st	63.3%	35.6%	Max Sandlin
2nd	61.2%	37.3%	Jim Turner
3rd	68.0%	29.4%	Sam Johnson
4th	70.8%	27.6%	Ralph Hall
5th	56.3%	41.0%	Pete Sessions
6th	69.3%	28.4%	Joe Barton
7th	70.7%	26.4%	Bill Archer
7th	70.7%	26.4%	John Culberson
8th	76.1%	22.0%	Kevin Brady
9th	53.8%	44.1%	Nick Lampson
10th	45.9%	42.5%	Lloyd Doggett
11th	65.2%	33.1%	Chet Edwards
12th	58.1%	39.6%	Kay Granger
13th	67.5%	30.5%	Mac Thornberry
14th	62.7%	34.1%	Ron Paul
15th	44.7%	53.9%	Rubén Hinojosa
16th	39.4%	58.0%	Silvestre Reyes
17th	70.2%	28.2%	Charles Stenholm
18th	26.1%	70.5%	Sheila Jackson Lee
19th	79.0%	19.4%	Larry Combest
20th	42.4%	54.5%	Charlie Gonzalez
21st	72.7%	24.1%	Lamar S. Smith
22nd	62.0%	35.6%	Tom DeLay
23rd	56.5%	41.3%	Henry Bonilla
24th	47.5%	50.9%	Martin Frost
25th	47.5%	49.5%	Ken Bentsen Jr.
26th	70.4%	26.8%	Dick Armey
27th	48.8%	49.3%	Solomon Ortiz
28th	41.9%	56.3%	Ciro Rodriguez
29th	38.4%	59.9%	Gene Green
30th	26.1%	70.5%	Eddie Bernice Johnson

== Analysis ==
The 2000 election in Texas was a very partisan election, with nearly 60% of voters voting for the Republican Party candidate. The third party vote shrunk to a total of 2.7%, likely because Ross Perot was not on the ballot that year. The vast majority of counties voted heavily for Governor Bush as his approval rating and popularity in the state was high. Many of the long time rural Democratic counties, including those in East Texas along the border of Louisiana, swung Republican as the national Democratic Party moved further to the left. Texas Democrats are more moderate to conservative by national standards, and many had a favorable view towards Bush because of his bipartisan approach with the Democratic state legislature during his tenure as governor.

Bush carried 230 of Texas's 254 counties. He racked up big margins in the Texas Panhandle, East Texas, the Permian Basin, the Texas Hill Country, and the Gulf Coast. He won every major and mid-sized city with the exceptions of El Paso, Laredo, Brownsville, McAllen, and Beaumont, all of which were carried by Vice President Al Gore. Two thinly populated counties, Glasscock and Ochiltree, gave Bush over 90% of the vote, with the former being the strongest Republican voting county in 2000. This marked the first time since 1956 that a Republican candidate won any of Texas's counties with over 90% of the vote, and the first time since Texas native Lyndon B. Johnson in 1964 that any candidate has done so.

Vice President Al Gore, the Democratic Party candidate, performed strongly in South Texas, which is composed of a heavy Latino population, and the city of El Paso. Three counties in East Texas voted for Gore by narrow margins: Jefferson, Morris, and Newton. This was the worst performance for a Democrat in East Texas since the 1984 election.

The Green Party candidate Ralph Nader, had his best performance in Travis County, home to the state capital Austin, winning 10.37% of the vote. As of the 2024 presidential election, this is the last time a Republican won this liberal Democratic-leaning county. This is also the last time Robertson County, and the East Texas counties of Newton and Morris voted Democratic, leaving Jefferson, home of Beaumont and Port Arthur, as the sole Democratic stronghold in this region until Donald Trump won it in 2016.

== Electors ==
The electors of each state and the District of Columbia met on December 18, 2000, to cast their votes for president and vice president. The Electoral College itself never meets as one body. Instead, the electors from each state and the District of Columbia met in their respective capitols.

The following were the members of the Electoral College from the state. All were pledged to and voted for George Bush and Dick Cheney:

1. Ernie Angelo
2. James R. Batsell
3. Carmen P. Castillo
4. Mary Ceverha
5. Ken Clark
6. Hally B. Clements
7. Mary E. Cowart
8. Sue Daniel
9. Michael Dugas
10. Betty R. Hines
11. Jim Hamlin
12. Cruz G. Hernandez
13. Chuck Jones
14. William Earl Juett
15. Neal J. Katz
16. Betsy Lake
17. Adair Margo
18. Loyce McCarter
19. Joseph I. Oniell III
20. Michael Paddie
21. Nancy Palm
22. Howard Pebley Jr.
23. Robert J. Peden
24. Helen Quiram
25. James B. Randall
26. Clyde Moody Siebman
27. Stan Stanart
28. Henry W. Teich Jr.
29. Randal Tye Thomas
30. James Davidson Walker
31. Tom F. Ward Jr.
32. Gayle West

== See also ==
- United States presidential elections in Texas
- Presidency of George W. Bush
