= Texas State Highway 84 =

State highway in Texas

State Highway 84
- Hachar-Reuthinger Road

Route information
- Maintained by TxDOT
- Length: 8.0 mi (12.9 km)
- Existed: 2023–present

Major junctions
- West end: FM 1472 at Laredo
- East end: I-35 / US 83 at Laredo

Location
- Country: United States
- State: Texas
- Counties: Webb

Highway system
- Highways in Texas; Interstate; US; State; Former; Toll; Loops; Spurs; FM/RM; Park; Rec
| ← US 84 | → US 85 |

State Highway 84 (SH 84) is an under construction state highway in Webb County in the U.S. state of Texas. The 8-mile-long (13 km) route is planned to connect Farm to Market Road 1472 (FM 1472), Mines Road, to Interstate 35 (I-35) in Laredo. The highway will be known as Hachar-Reuthinger Road.

== History ==
=== Former route ===
A previous route numbered SH 84 was designated on August 21, 1923, as a route across West Texas from the New Mexico state line through Brownfield and Post to Jayton, replacing portions of SH 18 and SH 39. On December 1, 1930, the section from Clairemont to Jayton was transferred to SH 70 when that highway was rerouted. In 1932, the route was co-located with US Highway 380 (US 380). In 1939, the co-designation with US 380 was completely removed.

SH 84A was a spur route designated on May 25, 1925, from SH 84 in Clairemont to Rotan. On March 19, 1930, it was renumbered as SH 161 (now SH 70).

=== Current route ===
Construction of the Hachar-Reuthinger Road has been considered critical by the city of Laredo due to increasing truck traffic counts on the World Trade Bridge. While the road has been proposed since 2014, progress was stalled in 2017. In February 2023, the Texas Department of Transportation (TxDOT) assumed responsibility for the maintenance and operation of the corridor, and the SH 84 designation was applied to it on May 25, 2023. Construction began in August 2024 and is estimated to conclude by Fall of 2026 or early 2027.
