= Texas State Highway 70 =

State highway in Texas

State Highway 70

Route information
- Maintained by TxDOT
- Length: 315.886 mi (Note: The certified length given is shorter than the actual mileage, as the TxDOT description of SH 70 considers it to be discontinuous at rather than concurrent with all Interstates and US highways.) (508.369 km)
- Existed: 1923–present

Major junctions
- South end: US 277 south of Blackwell
- I-20 / US 84 in Sweetwater; US 180 in Roby; US 380 in Jayton; SH 208 near Spur; US 82 / SH 114 in Dickens; US 62 / US 70 in Matador; SH 86 in Turkey; US 287 in Clarendon; I-40 near Groom; US 60 / SH 152 in Pampa
- North end: US 83 south of Perryton

Location
- Country: United States
- State: Texas
- Counties: Coke, Nolan, Fisher, Kent, Dickens, Motley, Hall, Briscoe, Donley, Gray, Roberts, Ochiltree

Highway system
- Highways in Texas; Interstate; US; State; Former; Toll; Loops; Spurs; FM/RM; Park; Rec
← US 70	→ SH 71

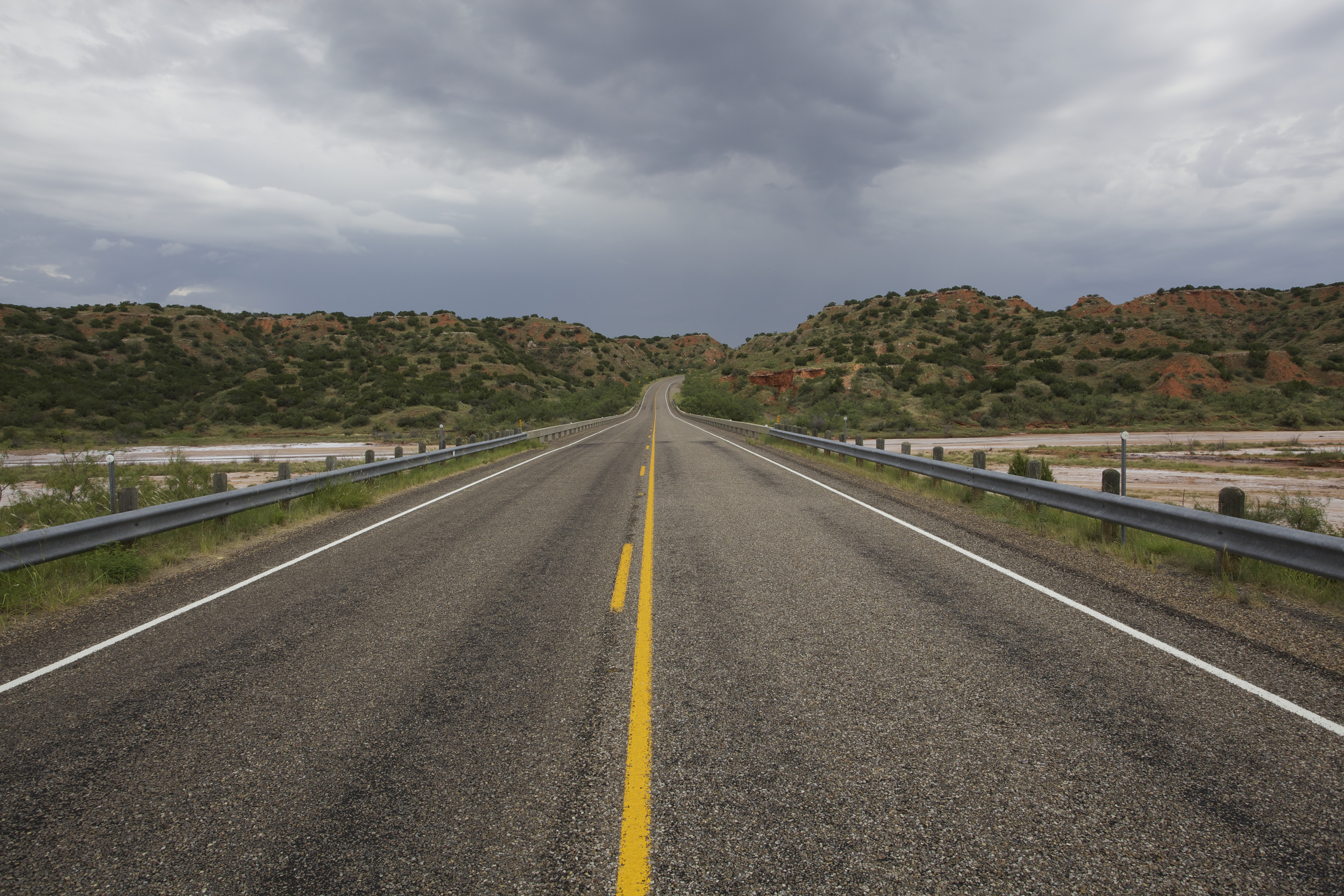
State Highway 70 crossing the Little Red River in Hall County, Texas.

State Highway 70 (SH 70) is a state highway in Texas. The route runs approximately 315 miles (507 km) from US 277 near Blackwell to US 83 south of Perryton.

== Route description ==
SH 70 begins in far northeastern Coke County at a junction with US 277 north of Bronte. The highway soon crosses into Nolan County, where it serves as the northern terminus of SH 153. The first large city along SH 70's route is Sweetwater; here, the route is concurrent with Interstate 20 and US 84 along the south side of the city, between I-20's Exits #244 and #247, before it resumes its northward course and enters Fisher County. SH 70 intersects US 180 in Roby and SH 92 in Rotan. Continuing north into Kent County, the route begins a concurrency with US 380 that lasts until Jayton. In Dickens County, SH 70 serves as the northern terminus of SH 208 and passes through the east and north side of Spur before reaching Dickens and an intersection with US 82 / SH 114. After heading almost due north from here, the route enters Motley County and passes through the town of Roaring Springs. The next major city along the route is Matador, where SH 70 and US 70 intersect one another (along with US 62). After leaving Matador, SH 70 enters Hall County, where it has a brief concurrency with SH 86 through Turkey. The highway then briefly turns to the northwest and enters Briscoe County, beginning a brief concurrency with SH 256, before turning to the west and reentering Hall County; the two routes separate near the community of South Brice. SH 70 resumes a more northerly path into Donley County, and has a short concurrency with US 287 through Clarendon. After the two routes separate, SH 70 heads due north to a junction with Interstate 40 at its Exit #124, near the Donley–Gray County line. Northbound SH 70 is concurrent with the freeway for about 3.5 mi (5.6 km) before the routes split at I-40 Exit #121. SH 70 continues north into Pampa, where it intersects US 60 and has a half-mile duplex with SH 152. After leaving Pampa, the route turns more to the north-northeast, and enters the sparsely populated Roberts County, where its only intersections are with a few farm to market roads that connect to the county seat of Miami. SH 70 then enters Ochiltree County and reaches its northern terminus at US 83 south of Perryton. While the current official route description of SH 70 indicates a concurrency with US 83 to a junction with SH 15 in Perryton, that roadway is presently signed only as US 83, which agrees with TxDOT's County Map Book, and signage in Perryton at the SH 15 junction with US 83 directs traffic to SH 70 using "TO SH 70" markers.

== History ==
SH 70 was originally designated on August 21, 1923, from Aspermont to San Angelo along a portion of the original SH 4, which had been shifted farther east. On October 13, 1925, it was routed through Robert Lee. On September 18, 1929, SH 70 was rerouted to bypass Robert Lee. Part became SH 70A, but Robert Lee to San Angelo was cancelled, but restored as SH 208 on July 16, 1934. On December 1, 1930, the route had been rerouted north to Jayton, replacing SH 161 and a small portion of SH 84. On September 26, 1939, SH 70 was extended north from Jayton to Dickens, absorbing a portion of SH 18. Significant extension came on October 10, 1947, when SH 70 was extended to Perryton in the northern Panhandle; this was due to the realignment of US 62 between Matador and Ralls, bypassing Dickens, and the cancellation of SH 18 from Matador to Perryton. On February 12, 1948, US 277 was rerouted to a more westerly alignment between Abilene, Texas and San Angelo, Texas, and the section from just south of Blackwell to near San Angelo was transferred to that route. On September 27, 1957, SH 70 was shifted to a more westerly alignment in Dickens, and Loop 120 was extended along the old route of SH 70 through the city.

A spur, SH 70A, was designated on September 18, 1929, from Robert Lee east to Bronte. This route was renumbered as SH 158 on March 19, 1930.

On September 27, 1985, Texas State Highway Loop 549 was designated as a bypass of SH 70 in Sweetwater and was signed, but not designated, as SH 70, and the old route was signed as a business route. On June 21, 1990, SH 70 was designated on Loop 549, and the old route of SH 70 became a business route, cancelling Loop 549.

== Business route ==
Business State Highway 70
- Location: Sweetwater
- Length: 3.788 mi (Note: The certified length given is shorter than the actual mileage, as the TxDOT description of Bus. SH 70 considers it to be discontinuous at rather than concurrent with BL I-20 in Sweetwater.) (6.096 km)
- Existed: 1990–present

SH 70 has one business route, Business SH 70-G in Sweetwater, which is a former alignment of the state highway through that city. The route was designated in 1990, when SH 70 was rerouted along the south and east side of the city to use the I-20 freeway. The business route is also concurrent with BL I-20 through downtown Sweetwater.

Junction list

The entire route is in Sweetwater, Nolan County.

mi	km	Destinations	Notes
0.0	0.0	I-20 / US 84 / SH 70 – Abilene, Roscoe, San Angelo	I-20 exit 244
1.5	2.4	I-20 BL west (Broadway Avenue) / FM 419 north (Elm Street)	South end of BL I-20 overlap
2.0	3.2	I-20 BL east (Broadway Avenue) – Abilene	North end of BL I-20 overlap
4.3	6.9	SH 70 – Roby, Abilene, Big Spring	
1.000 mi = 1.609 km; 1.000 km = 0.621 mi: Concurrency terminus

== Major intersections ==
County	Location	mi	km	Destinations	Notes
Coke		0.0	0.0	US 277 – San Angelo, Abilene	Southern terminus; interchange
Coke		1.6	2.6	FM 3399 north	
Nolan	Blackwell	5.8	9.3	FM 1170 – Maryneal, Hylton	
Nolan		20.7	33.3	SH 153 south – Wingate, Winters	
Nolan		21.3	34.3	FM 608 west – Maryneal	
Nolan		27.7	44.6	FM 1809 west	
Nolan		28.6	46.0	FM 1856 east – Lake Sweetwater	
Nolan	Sweetwater	31.8	51.2	I-20 west / US 84 west (Georgia Avenue) – Roscoe Bus. SH 70 north (Lamar Street) – Downtown Sweetwater	South end of I-20/US 84 concurrency, exit 244.
Nolan	Sweetwater	34.8	56.0	I-20 east / US 84 east / I-20 BL – Abilene	North end of I-20/US 84 concurrency, exit 247; south end of I-20 Bus. concurrency.
Nolan	Sweetwater	36.0	57.9	I-20 BL west	North end of I-20 Bus. concurrency
Nolan	Sweetwater	37.2	59.9	Bus. SH 70 south – Sweetwater	
Fisher		42.1	67.8	FM 2744 east	
Fisher		47.1	75.8	FM 57 – Longworth, Hamlin	
Fisher	Roby	54.4	87.5	US 180 – Snyder, Anson	
Fisher	Rotan	63.9	102.8	SH 92 east / FM 611 west – Hamlin, Hobbs	
Fisher		70.8	113.9	FM 610 east – Aspermont	
Kent		90.0	144.8	US 380 west – Post	South end of US 380 concurrency
Kent		92.3	148.5	FM 1083 north	
Kent	Jayton	97.5	156.9	US 380 east – Aspermont	North end of US 380 concurrency
Kent	Jayton	98.3	158.2	FM 1083 south	
Kent	Jayton	99.0	159.3	FM 1228 north	
Kent	Girard	107.8	173.5	FM 643 west	
Dickens	Gilpin	112.9	181.7	FM 3294 north	
Dickens	Steele Hill	117.6	189.3	SH 208 south – Clairemont, Snyder	
Dickens	Spur	121.2	195.1	Loop 21	
Dickens	Spur	122.2	196.7	Loop 21 to FM 836	
Dickens		13.7	22.0	FM 1868 north	
Dickens		129.3	208.1	FM 1868 south	
Dickens	Dickens	132.2	212.8	Loop 120	
Dickens	Dickens	132.6	213.4	US 82 / SH 114 – Crosbyton, Guthrie	
Dickens		133.1	214.2	Loop 120	
Dickens		142.7	229.7	FM 193 – McAdoo, Afton	
Motley		149.2	240.1	FM 3203 north – Roaring Springs Ranch	
Motley	Roaring Springs	151.4	243.7	Loop 42 north / FM 684 – Roaring Springs	
Motley	Roaring Springs	152.3	245.1	Loop 42 south – Roaring Springs	
Motley		154.1	248.0	FM 1045 east	
Motley	Matador	160.1	257.7	US 62 / US 70 – Floydada, Paducah	
Motley	Matador	160.2	257.8	Spur 196 east	
Motley		161.0	259.1	FM 94 north	
Motley				FM 2999	
Motley				FM 2009	
Motley				FM 97 – Flomot	
Hall	Turkey			SH 86 west (Main Street) – Quitaque, Tulia	South end of SH 86 concurrency
Hall				SH 86 east – Estelline	North end of SH 86 concurrency
Briscoe				SH 256 west – Silverton	South end of SH 256 concurrency
Hall	South Brice			SH 256 east – Memphis	North end of SH 256 concurrency
Donley	Clarendon			US 287 south – Childress	South end of US 287 concurrency
Donley	Clarendon			FM 2162 to FM 2362	
Donley	Clarendon			US 287 north – Amarillo	North end of US 287 concurrency
Donley				I-40 east – Oklahoma City	South end of I-40 concurrency, exit 124.
Donley				I-40 west – Amarillo	North end of I-40 concurrency, exit 121.
Gray				FM 2477 – Lake McClellan	
Gray				FM 293	
Gray				FM 749 – Bowers City	
Gray				Loop 171 north – Lefors	
Gray	Pampa			FM 750 (McCullough Street)	
Gray	Pampa			US 60 / SH 152 east – Panhandle, Canadian, Wheeler	South end of SH 152 concurrency
Gray	Pampa			SH 152 west (Alcock Street) / Francis Avenue – Borger	North end of SH 152 concurrency
Gray				Loop 171 south	
Roberts				FM 282 – Miami	
Roberts				FM 283 – Miami	
Ochiltree				FM 281	
Ochiltree				FM 759 – Spearman	
Ochiltree	Ochiltree			FM 3045 – Farnsworth	
Ochiltree				US 83 – Perryton, Canadian	Northern terminus
1.000 mi = 1.609 km; 1.000 km = 0.621 mi: Concurrency terminus
