= Jesse Powell (American football) =

American football player (1947–2012)

No. 56
- Position: Linebacker

Personal information
- Born: April 14, 1947; Matador, Texas, U.S.
- Died: June 14, 2012 (aged 65); Lubbock, Texas, U.S.
- Listed height: 6 ft 2 in (1.88 m)
- Listed weight: 220 lb (100 kg)

Career information
- High school: Spur (Spur, Texas)
- College: West Texas A&M
- NFL draft: 1969: 9th round, 219th overall pick

Career history
- Miami Dolphins (1969-1973)

Awards and highlights
- 2× Super Bowl champion (VII, VIII)

Career NFL/AFL statistics
- Fumble recoveries: 3
- Sacks: 1
- Stats at Pro Football Reference

Jesse Loy Powell (April 14, 1947 – June 14, 2012) was an American professional football linebacker in the National Football League (NFL). He attended West Texas A&M. He played linebacker and special teams with the Miami Dolphins from 1969 to 1973.

Powell was a member of the Dolphins during their perfect season of 1972 when the team had a 17-0 combined record in the regular season and playoffs and won Super Bowl VII. Early in the 1973 season he was bothered by a chronic knee injury he suffered the prior season, which required season-ending surgery after 3 games to remove bone chips. He announced his retirement from pro football just before the start of the 1974 preseason. Overall, Powell played for three Super Bowl teams.

Following retirement from the NFL, Powell briefly worked in the food industry before working with State Farm Insurance for 35 years. He retired from that company on March 31, 2012.

Powell died in a Texas hospital on June 14, 2012. His brother told a local news agency that the mechanism of death was cardiac arrest, but a formal cause of death had not been established.
