= Jim W. Corder =

American rhetorician (1929–1998)

Jimmie Wayne Corder
- Born: September 25, 1929; Jayton, Texas
- Died: August 28, 1998 (aged 68); Fort Worth, Texas
- Occupation: Professor of English

== Biography ==
Jimmie Wayne Corder (September 25, 1929 in Jayton, Texas – August 28, 1998 in Fort Worth, Texas) was a scholar of rhetoric.

Professor of English at Texas Christian University, Jim W. Corder was a scholar and teacher, producing books and articles on the history and theory of rhetoric studies and the teaching of writing.

== Professional and academic career ==
Corder is best known for his tendency to cross over and blur the distinctions between the conventional boundaries that define academic discourse, and to resist prevailing or dominating ideological orientations about language and knowledge and how those concepts function within current notions of rhetoric and rhetorical criticism.

== Philosophical views ==
In much of his writing, especially later in his career, Corder pushes the envelope in the stylistic moves and choices he makes within his language, such as invoking personal experiences and weaving narratives in and through his arguments as rhetorical tropes in and of themselves. While much of his writing appears in nationally recognized publications such as College English, College Composition and Communication, and Rhetoric Review, Corder's contribution to the body of knowledge within rhetoric and composition has not been fully realized by others in the field. He crafts scholarly arguments for academic audiences, but he articulates them through stylistic and structural moves that resist typical conventions of academic writing.

As a result of his writing style, Corder is often associated with scholars like Peter Elbow and other so-called “expressivists,” who were largely dismissed by many scholars in the discipline during the social turn of the late 1980s, as rhetoric and composition professionals began exploring critical theory and cultural studies and their connections to rhetorical theory and composition pedagogy. However, now some scholars believe that we need to look back to earlier work emerging from discussions within rhetoric and composition as a way of revisiting and revising past notions and theories through a contemporary contextual lens.

Keith D. Miller points to a possible cause for Corder's lackluster reception within the discipline of rhetoric and composition, in his essay, “The Radical, Feminist Rhetoric of Jim Corder.” Miller explains that “Corder constantly torpedoes genre distinctions between personal essays and scholarship, occasionally bemoaning others’ failure to blend the expressive with the intellectual”. Miller recounts:

Corder once told me: ‘All taxonomies leak.’ But instead of constructing a better ship with tighter compartments, he places dynamite into the leaking holes of every available taxonomy and genre category. Exploding cargo-holds disorients readers by disrupting their expectations, which hinge on the stability of well-defined genres.

Miller specifically highlights Corder's defiance of genre expectations within Hunting Lieutenant Chadbourne, suggesting that “he fuses autobiography, postmodern rhetoric, and nineteenth-century American historiography.” The resulting mixed modes and blended genres makes the book as much of a history of Lt. Chadbourne as it is Corder's argument against conventional academic discourse, particularly in the realm of historical research. Miller suggests that “to raid different genres and disciplines is to argue indirectly by prodding readers to ask: ‘What is going on?’” That is, Corder wishes to challenge the ways that scholars conceive of and write about knowledge and history, and Hunting Lieutenant Chadbourne embodies both his critique and his argument for an alternative approach, one that invite[s] a reader to share his process of contemplating and weighing. Just as he patiently explores a problem, he implicitly argues, so should a reader.” However, particularly because he eschews pre-established genre structures, “Corder generates momentum by creating the impression of thinking aloud,” which allows him to subvert “standard academic discourse by creating a sense of puzzling over a problem with a reader instead of handing her solutions.”

== Published works ==
=== Books ===
- Lost in West Texas (1988)
- Chronicle of a Small Town (1989)
- Yonder: Life on the Far Side of Change (1992)
- Hunting Lieutenant Chadbourne (1993)

=== Articles ===
- “The Story of Rhetoric: A Long Protest and a Short Program.” College Composition and Communication 12.2 (1961): 93–95.
- "On Keeping Posted and Being Nudged: Some Problems in the Continuing Education of Practicing Teachers." English in Texas 4 (1973): 32-34.
- “What I Learned at School.” College Composition and Communication 25 (1975): 330–34. Reprinted in Selected Essays of Jim Corder: Pursuing the Personal in Scholarship, Teaching, and Writing. Ed.. James Baumlin and Keith Miller. NCTE, 2004.
- (with George Tade and Gary Tate) "For Sale, Lease, or Rent: A Curriculum for an Undergraduate Program in Rhetoric." College Composition and Communication 26 (1975): 20-24.
- “Outhouses, Weather Changes, and the Return to the Basics in English Education.” College English 38 (1977): 474–82.
- “Varieties of Ethical Argument, With Some Account of the Significance of Ethos in the Teaching of Composition.” Freshman English News 6 (1978): 1-23. Reprinted in Selected Essays of Jim Corder: Pursuing the Personal in Scholarship, Teaching, and Writing. Ed.. James Baumlin and Keith Miller. NCTE, 2004.
- "Late Word from the Provinces." New Mexico Humanities Review 2 (1979): 24-27. Reprinted in Selected Essays of Jim Corder: Pursuing the Personal in Scholarship, Teaching, and Writing. Ed.. James Baumlin and Keith Miller. NCTE, 2004.
- "You Operationalize-- I'll Plug Away." Liberal Education 66 (1980): 440-445.
- “Rhetoric and Literary Study: Some Lines of Inquiry” College Composition and Communication 32.1 (1981): 13–20.
- "I'll Trade You One Meditation, a Contrary View, and Some Commas for an Electric Coffee Pot and a Video Display Terminal: Or, Some Notes on the Humanities and Technology." Nebraska Humanist 3 (1981): 29-35.
- "A Speech about Comanches and Miracles Made to Premedical Students, Who Are Not as Scary as Doctors." Perspectives in Biology and Medicine (1981): 189-194.
- "Against a Mournful Wind." New Mexico Humanities Review 4 (1981): 13-17.
- "Caught in the Middle." Liberal Education 68 (1982): 69-74.
- "From an Undisclosed Past into an Unknown Future." Liberal Education 68 (1982): 75-78.
- "On Cancer and Freshman Composition, or the Use of Rhetorical Language in the Description of Oncogenetic Behavior." CEA Critic 45 (1982): 1-9.
- "Studying Rhetoric and Teaching School." Rhetoric Review 1 (1982): 4-36. Reprinted in Selected Essays of Jim Corder: Pursuing the Personal in Scholarship, Teaching, and Writing. Ed.. James Baumlin and Keith Miller. NCTE, 2004.
- "Stalking the Wild Grade Inflator." Liberal Education 69 (1983): 173-177.
- "Tribal Virtues." Liberal Education 69 (1983): 179-182.
- “From Rhetoric to Grace: Propositions 55-81 about Rhetoric, Propositions 1-54 and 82 et seq. Being as Yet Unstated; Or Getting from the Classroom to the World.” Rhetoric Society Quarterly 14.1/2 (1984): 15–29.
- "A New Introduction to Psychoanalysis, Taken as a Version of Modern Rhetoric." Pre/Text 5 (1984): 137-169. Reprinted in Selected Essays of Jim Corder: Pursuing the Personal in Scholarship, Teaching, and Writing. Ed.. James Baumlin and Keith Miller. NCTE, 2004.
- “Argument as Emergence, Rhetoric as Love.” Rhetoric Review 4 (1985): 16–32. Reprinted in Selected Essays of Jim Corder: Pursuing the Personal in Scholarship, Teaching, and Writing. Ed.. James Baumlin and Keith Miller. NCTE, 2004.
- “On the Way, Perhaps, to a New Rhetoric, But Not There Yet, and If We Get There, There Won’t Be There Anymore.” College English 47 (1985): 162–70. Reprinted in Selected Essays of Jim Corder: Pursuing the Personal in Scholarship, Teaching, and Writing. Ed.. James Baumlin and Keith Miller. NCTE, 2004.
- "The Time the Calvary Didn't Come, or the Quest for Saving Authority in Recent Studies of Higher Education." Liberal Education 71 (1985): 305-319.
- "What to Do with Leftovers." Bulletin of American Association for Higher Education 38 (1985): 9-12.
- "Why Deans, Chairman, and Other Rascals Sometimes Seem (and Maybe Are) Uncreative." Bulletin of American Association for Higher Education 39 (1986): 8-9.
- “Learning the Text: Little Notes about Interpretation, Harold Bloom, the Topoi, and the Oratio.” College English 48.3 (1986): 243–48.
- "Some of What I Learned at a Rhetoric Conference." Freshman English News 15 (1986): 11-12.
- "Lonesomeness in English Studies." ADE Bulletin 85 (1986): 36-39.
- "The Rock-Kicking Championship of the Whole World, Now and Forevermore." Arete: The Journal of Sports Literature 4 (1987): 1-6.
- "The Heroes Have Gone from the Grocery Store." Arete: The Journal of Sports Literature 5 (1987): 73-78.
- "Opinion Is, of Course, Bad; Research, on the Other Hand, Is Quite Good: The Tyranny (or Is It Myth?) of Methodology." Journal of Higher Education 58 (1987): 463-469.
- “When (Do I/Shall I/May I/Must I/Is It Appropriate for me to) (Say No To/Deny/Resist/ Repudiate/ Attack/Alter) Any (Poem/ Poet/Other/Piece of the World) for My Sake?” Rhetoric Society Quarterly 13 (1988): 45–68.
- "Occasion and Need in Writing: An Annotated Essay." Freshman English News 17 (1988): 3-4, 10.
- (with James Baumlin) "Lamentati0ons for-- and Hopes against-- Authority in Education." Educational Theory 38 (1988): 11-26.
- "Another Geography Course?" Perspectives 19 (1989): 1-7.
- "Asking for a Text and Trying to Learn It." Encountering Student Texts. Ed. Bruce Lawson, Susan Sterr Ryan, and W. Ross Winterowd. NCTE, 1989, 89-98.
- "Hoping for Essays." Literary Nonfiction: Theory, Criticism, Pedagogy. Ed. Chris Anderson. Southern Illinois UP, 1989, 301-314.
- “Hunting for Ethos Where They Say It Can’t Be Found.” Rhetoric Review 7 (1989): 299–316. Reprinted in Selected Essays of Jim Corder: Pursuing the Personal in Scholarship, Teaching, and Writing. Ed.. James Baumlin and Keith Miller. NCTE, 2004.
- (with James Baumlin) "Jackleg Carpentry and the Fall from Freedom into Authority in Writing." Freshman English News 18 (1990): 18-25.
- "Academic Jargon and the Soul-Searching Drivel." Rhetoric Review 9 (1991): 314-326.
- "Collaboration and Autonomy, Owning and Sharecropping." Freshman English News 19 (1991): 11-12.
- "Traditional Lectures Still Have a Place in the Classroom." Chronicle of Higher Education 12 June 1991: B2.
- "At Last Report I Was Still Here." The Subject is Writing; Essays by Teachers and Students. Ed. Wendy Bishop. Boynton/Cook, 1993, 261-65.
- "From Rhetoric into Other Studies." Defining the New Rhetorics. Ed. Theresa Enos and Stuart Brown. Sage, 1993, 95-108.
- "Tribes and Displaced Persons: Some Observations on Collaboration." Theory and Practice in the Teaching of Writing: Rethinking the Discipline. Ed. Lee Odell. Southern Illinois UP, 1993, 217-288.
- "The Tyranny of Inattention." Journal of Higher Education 64 (1993): 594-599.
- "Humanism Isn't a Dirty Word." In "Voice as Echo of Delivery, Ethos as Transforming Process" by Theresa Enos. Composition in Context: Essays in Honor of Donald C. Stewart. Ed. W. Ross Winterowd and Vincent Gillespie. Southern Illinois UP, 1994, 190-192.
- "Hunting Lieutenant Chadbourne: A Search for Ethos Whether Real or Pretended." Ethos: New Essays in Rhetorical and Critical Theory. Eds. James Baumlin and Tita Baumlin. Southern Methodist UP, 1994, 343-365. Reprinted in Selected Essays of Jim Corder: Pursuing the Personal in Scholarship, Teaching, and Writing. Ed.. James Baumlin and Keith Miller. NCTE, 2004.
- "Notes on a Rhetoric of Regret." Composition Studies/Freshman English News 23 (1995): 94-105.
- "On Argument, What Some Call 'Self-Writing,' and Trying to See the Back Side of One's Own Eyeballs." Rhetoric Review 22 (2003): 31-39.
- "I in Mine, You Elsewhere," "Aching for a Self," and "Places in the Mind." Selected Essays of Jim Corder: Pursuing the Personal in Scholarship, Teaching, and Writing. Ed.. James Baumlin and Keith Miller. NCTE, 2004.
