= Texas State Highway 92 =

State highway in Texas

State Highway 92
- SH 92 highlighted in red

Route information
- Maintained by TxDOT
- Length: 37.93 mi (61.04 km)
- Existed: 1924–present

Major junctions
- West end: SH 70 / FM 611 at Rotan
- US 83 at Hamlin
- East end: US 277 / FM 2702 near Stamford

Location
- Country: United States
- State: Texas

Highway system
- Highways in Texas; Interstate; US; State; Former; Toll; Loops; Spurs; FM/RM; Park; Rec
| ← SH 91 | → SH 93 |

State Highway 92 (SH 92) is a state highway that runs 38 miles (61 km) between Stamford and Rotan, Texas.

Historic SH 92

SH 92 was originally designated in 1923-1924 from Bronson to Hemphill. SH 92 was also designated on March 17, 1924, between Stamford and Hamlin. For 3 months, there were two highways numbered SH 92. On June 16, 1924, the SH 92 from Bronson to Hemphill was cancelled, leaving only one SH 92 from Stamford to Hamlin. On February 9, 1933, there was a proposed extension southwest to Longworth. On July 15, 1935, the section from Hamlin to Longworth was cancelled. On August 2, 1937, SH 92 extended from Hamlin to Rotan (this was completed by 1938).

== Junction list ==
| County | Location | mi | km | Destinations | Notes |
|---|---|---|---|---|---|
| Fisher | Rotan | | | SH 70 / FM 611 | |
| Fisher | | | | FM 1224 | |
| Fisher | | | | FM 540 | |
| Jones | Hamlin | | | US 83 | |
| Jones | Hamlin | | | FM 1835 | |
| Jones | | | | FM 1661 | |
| Jones | | | | US 277 / FM 2702 | |
1.000 mi = 1.609 km; 1.000 km = 0.621 mi
