= Kent County, Texas =

County in Texas, United States

- County
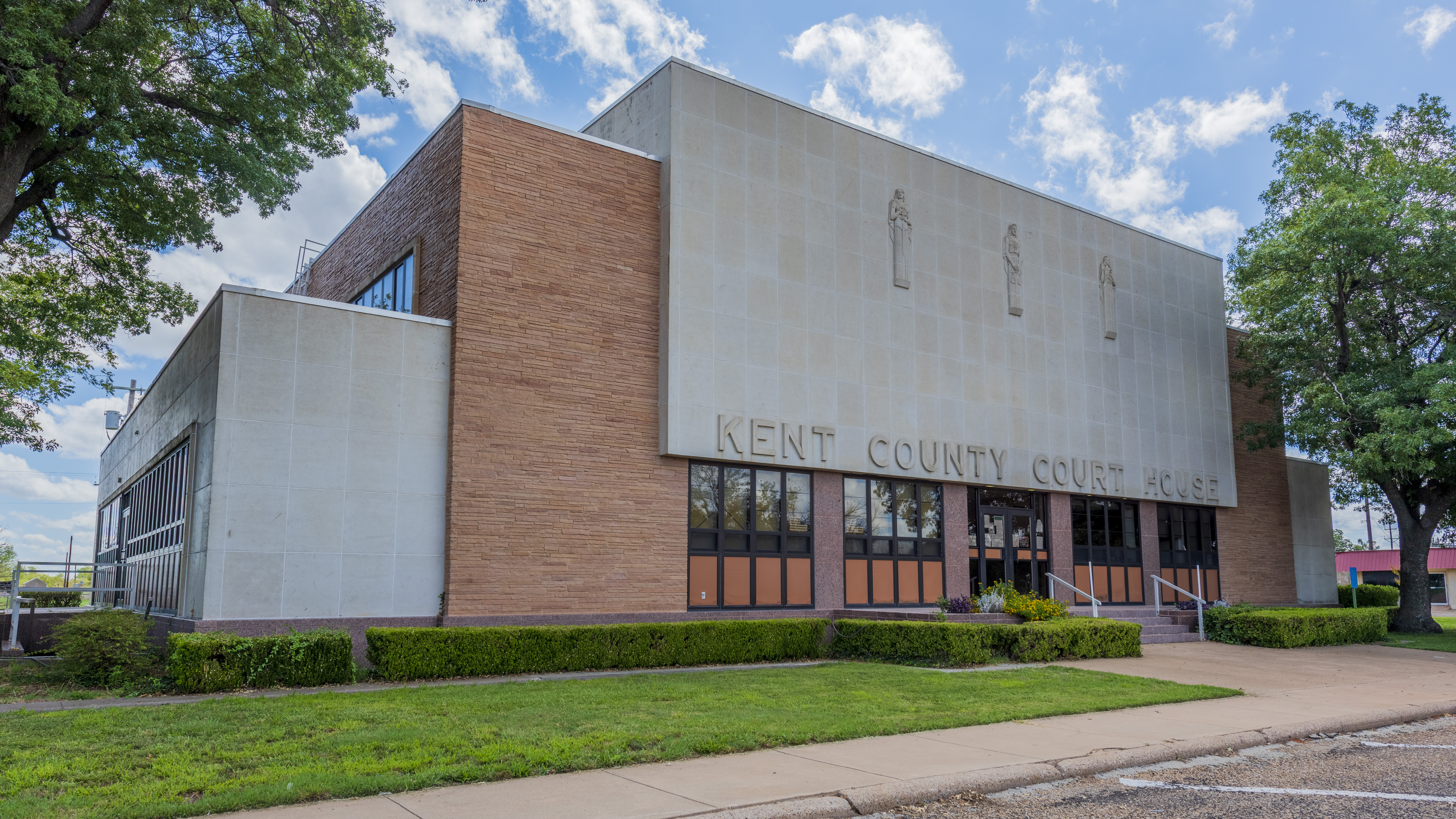
- Kent County Courthouse in Jayton

- Location within the U.S. state of Texas
- Coordinates: 33°11′N 100°46′W
- Country: United States
- State: Texas
- Founded: 1892
- Named for: Andrew Kent
- Seat: Jayton
- Largest city: Jayton

Area
  - Total: 903 sq mi (2,340 km^{2})
  - Land: 903 sq mi (2,340 km^{2})
  - Water: 0.4 sq mi (1.0 km^{2}) 0.05%

Population (2020)
  - Total: 753
  - Estimate (2025): 674 ▼
  - Density: 0.834/sq mi (0.322/km^{2})
- Time zone: UTC−6 (Central)
  - Summer (DST): UTC−5 (CDT)
- Congressional district: 19th
- Website: www.co.kent.tx.us

Kent County is a county located in the U.S. state of Texas. As of the 2020 census, its population was 753, making it the sixth-least populous county in Texas. Its county seat is Jayton. The county was created in 1876 and later organized in 1892. It is named for Andrew Kent, who died at the Battle of the Alamo. Kent County is a prohibition or entirely dry county, one of three remaining in the state.

== History timeline ==
- 8000 BC Paleo-Indians were the first inhabitants. Later Native American inhabitants included the Wanderers band of Comanche.
- 1872 Ranald S. Mackenzie and his soldiers trounced the Comanches at Treasure Butte, southeast of Clairemont.
- 1876 The Texas legislature formed Kent County from Young and Bexar districts. The new county is named after Alamo defender Andrew Kent.
- 1888 Cattleman R. L. Rhomberg settled in the new county and named a settlement Clairemont for his daughter, Claire.
- 1890 The county census recorded 324 residents.
- 1891 A conflict arose between cattle ranchers and farmers who tried to fence their farms against cattle.
- 1892 Kent County was organized, with Clairemont as the county seat.
- 1900 The county population was 899.
- 1909 The Stamford and Northeastern Railway built a line across the county's northeast corner. The railroad, which connected Stamford and Spur, later became part of the Wichita Valley Railroad. The Jayton community was founded.
- 1930 The county's population peaked at 3,851.
- 1946-1991 Oil was discovered in Kent County in 1946. From 1946 to 1991, more than 448,448,000 barrels (71,297,500 m^{3}) of oil have been produced in the county.

== Geography ==
According to the United States Census Bureau, the county has a total area of 903 square miles (2,340 km^{2}), of which 0.4 sq mi (1.0 km^{2}) (0.05%) is covered by water.

=== Major highways ===
- U.S. Highway 380
- State Highway 70
- State Highway 208

=== Adjacent counties ===
- Dickens County (north)
- Stonewall County (east)
- Fisher County (southeast)
- Scurry County (south)
- Garza County (west)
- King County (northeast)
- Crosby County (northwest)

== Demographics ==
Historical population
Census	Pop.	Note	%±
1880	92		—
1890	324		252.2%
1900	899		177.5%
1910	2,655		195.3%
1920	3,335		25.6%
1930	3,851		15.5%
1940	3,413		−11.4%
1950	2,249		−34.1%
1960	1,727		−23.2%
1970	1,434		−17.0%
1980	1,145		−20.2%
1990	1,010		−11.8%
2000	859		−15.0%
2010	808		−5.9%
2020	753		−6.8%
2025 (est.)	674	▼	−10.5%
U.S. Decennial Census; 1850–2010 2010-2020

=== Racial and ethnic composition ===
Kent County, Texas – Racial and ethnic composition Note: the US Census treats Hispanic/Latino as an ethnic category. This table excludes Latinos from the racial categories and assigns them to a separate category. Hispanics/Latinos may be of any race.
Race / Ethnicity (NH = Non-Hispanic)	Pop 2000	Pop 2010	Pop 2020	% 2000	% 2010	% 2020
White alone (NH)	777	669	657	90.45%	82.80%	87.25%
Black or African American alone (NH)	2	6	2	0.23%	0.74%	0.27%
Native American or Alaska Native alone (NH)	1	5	3	0.12%	0.62%	0.40%
Asian alone (NH)	0	0	0	0.00%	0.00%	0.00%
Pacific Islander alone (NH)	0	0	0	0.00%	0.00%	0.00%
Other race alone (NH)	0	0	3	0.00%	0.00%	0.40%
Mixed or multiracial (NH)	1	8	7	0.12%	0.99%	0.93%
Hispanic or Latino (any race)	78	120	81	9.08%	14.85%	10.76%
Total	859	808	753	100.00%	100.00%	100.00%

=== 2020 census ===
As of the 2020 census, the county had a population of 753. The median age was 52.8 years; 19.3% of residents were under the age of 18 and 31.6% of residents were 65 years of age or older. For every 100 females there were 96.6 males, and for every 100 females age 18 and over there were 93.0 males age 18 and over.

The racial makeup of the county was 89.8% White, 0.3% Black or African American, 0.8% American Indian and Alaska Native, 0.1% Asian, <0.1% Native Hawaiian and Pacific Islander, 4.1% from some other race, and 4.9% from two or more races. Hispanic or Latino residents of any race comprised 10.8% of the population.

<0.1% of residents lived in urban areas, while 100.0% lived in rural areas.

There were 312 households in the county, of which 31.7% had children under the age of 18 living in them. Of all households, 50.6% were married-couple households, 19.2% were households with a male householder and no spouse or partner present, and 27.9% were households with a female householder and no spouse or partner present. About 28.5% of all households were made up of individuals and 16.0% had someone living alone who was 65 years of age or older.

There were 522 housing units, of which 40.2% were vacant. Among occupied housing units, 80.4% were owner-occupied and 19.6% were renter-occupied. The homeowner vacancy rate was 1.2% and the rental vacancy rate was 12.9%.

=== 2000 census ===
As of the 2000 census, 859 people, 353 households, and 247 families resided in the county. The population density was less than 1/km^{2} (2.6/mi^{2}). The 551 housing units averaged about zero point six units per square mile (0.23 units/km^{2}). The racial makeup of the county was 95.46% White, 0.23% Black or African American, 0.35% Native American, 3.73% from other races, and 0.23% from two or more races. About 9% of the population were Hispanic or Latino of any race.

Of the 353 households, 26.1% had children under 18 living with them, 61.2% were married couples living together, 5.9% had a female householder with no husband present, and 30.0% were not families. About 28.0% of all households were made up of individuals, and 14.2% had someone living alone who was 65 or older. The average household size was 2.33 and the average family size was 2.83.

In the county, the population was distributed as 20.6% under 18, 5.4% from 18 to 24, 21.8% from 25 to 44, 26.8% from 45 to 64, and 25.5% who were 65 or older. The median age was 47 years. For every 100 females, there were 91.7 males. For every 100 females 18 and over, there were 91.6 males.

The median income for a household in the county was $30,433, and for a family was $35,568. Males had a median income of $23,875 versus $20,000 for females. The per capita income for the county was $17,626. About 9.20% of families and 10.40% of the population were below the poverty line, including 13.10% of those under age 18 and 6.10% of those age 65 or over.

== Communities ==
=== City ===
- Jayton (county seat)

=== Other communities ===
- Clairemont (ghost town)
- Girard (census-designated place)

== Politics ==
In the 2024 Texas Republican presidential primary, Kent County was the only county in Texas that Donald Trump lost. However, due to demographically similar counties overwhelmingly backing Trump, observers have speculated that this could have been the result of a data entry error.

Throughout the 20th century, Kent County was a reliably Democratic county, having only voted for a Republican three times from 1912 until 2000. Kent County has realigned into a Republican stronghold since George W. Bush won the county in 2000. As of 2024, Kent County has not selected a Democrat in a presidential election since 1996, when then Democratic incumbent Bill Clinton won it.

Kent County is located within District 83 of the Texas House of Representatives. Kent County is located within District 28 of the Texas Senate.

United States presidential election results for Kent County, Texas
Year	Republican		Democratic		Third party(ies)	
Year	No.	%	No.	%	No.	%
1912	7	3.83%	135	73.77%	41	22.40%
1916	2	0.84%	212	88.70%	25	10.46%
1920	45	15.90%	214	75.62%	24	8.48%
1924	80	16.88%	386	81.43%	8	1.69%
1928	363	69.01%	163	30.99%	0	0.00%
1932	23	3.92%	561	95.57%	3	0.51%
1936	31	5.50%	533	94.50%	0	0.00%
1940	79	9.97%	712	89.90%	1	0.13%
1944	31	4.71%	572	86.93%	55	8.36%
1948	33	6.18%	479	89.70%	22	4.12%
1952	259	32.95%	526	66.92%	1	0.13%
1956	234	30.99%	519	68.74%	2	0.26%
1960	205	29.37%	491	70.34%	2	0.29%
1964	115	16.96%	563	83.04%	0	0.00%
1968	143	22.56%	303	47.79%	188	29.65%
1972	465	67.59%	223	32.41%	0	0.00%
1976	171	26.43%	474	73.26%	2	0.31%
1980	339	48.85%	351	50.58%	4	0.58%
1984	332	56.46%	253	43.03%	3	0.51%
1988	274	40.65%	398	59.05%	2	0.30%
1992	175	28.69%	271	44.43%	164	26.89%
1996	187	36.31%	260	50.49%	68	13.20%
2000	346	64.55%	185	34.51%	5	0.93%
2004	382	73.18%	138	26.44%	2	0.38%
2008	342	76.34%	99	22.10%	7	1.56%
2012	335	82.72%	66	16.30%	4	0.99%
2016	360	82.95%	59	13.59%	15	3.46%
2020	411	88.96%	47	10.17%	4	0.87%
2024	390	87.64%	50	11.24%	5	1.12%

United States Senate election results for Kent County, Texas1
Year	Republican		Democratic		Third party(ies)	
Year	No.	%	No.	%	No.	%
2024	383	85.49%	58	12.95%	7	1.56%

United States Senate election results for Kent County, Texas2
Year	Republican		Democratic		Third party(ies)	
Year	No.	%	No.	%	No.	%
2020	386	86.74%	53	11.91%	6	1.35%

Texas Gubernatorial election results for Kent County
Year	Republican		Democratic		Third party(ies)	
Year	No.	%	No.	%	No.	%
2022	312	89.14%	34	9.71%	4	1.14%

== Education ==
School districts include:

- Jayton-Girard Independent School District
- Post Independent School District
- Rotan Independent School District
- Snyder Independent School District
- Spur Independent School District

The Texas Legislature designated the county as being in the Western Texas College district.

== See also ==
- Dry counties
- Double Mountain Fork Brazos River
- National Register of Historic Places listings in Kent County, Texas
- Recorded Texas Historic Landmarks in Kent County
