= Silver, Texas =

- Unincorporated community
- Location within the state of Texas Silver (the United States)
- Coordinates: 32°04′15″N 100°40′57″W
- Country: United States
- State: Texas
- County: Coke
- Elevation: 2,100 ft (640 m)
- Time zone: UTC-6 (Central (CST))
  - Summer (DST): UTC-5 (CDT)
- ZIP codes: 76949
- GNIS feature ID: 1347126

Silver is an unincorporated community in northwestern Coke County, Texas, United States. According to the Handbook of Texas, the community had a population of 60 in 2000.

== History ==
In the 1870s, Silver was a ranching community. In 1890, Thomas J. Wiley opened the first post office. Due to a drought, the post office closed in 1907 but reopened that next year. Between 1910 and 1940, only ten people lived there. Allen Jameson's land was found to contain oil in 1946, and by July 1949 the Sun Oil Company had installed 59 producing wells in the Jameson oilfield. State Highway 208 was paved from Robert Lee to Silver, and a rail spur was constructed from Maryneal. With around a thousand people living in camps the oil company built, Silver grew to be one of the biggest cities in the county. In addition, the town featured two cafes, three churches, a business recreation facility, and several retailers. The field's oil output began to diminish in the middle of the 1960s, and the Sun Oil Company ended most of its activities there. In 1980, the population was sixty, but in 1986, Silver had a trucking company, a blacksmith and welding shop, and a field office for Sun Oil Company. Even so, the post office remained operating. In 2000, there were six companies in the hamlet and the population remained at sixty. The population was reduced to 30 in 2010.

S.M. Conner, W.G. Jameson, and W.R. Walker were among the first landowners in the area. Dr. J.E. Reed served as the community's physician for 50 years. R.B. Allen was another prominent settler. The post office and school were named for a nearby peak.

Although Silver is unincorporated, it has a post office, with the ZIP code of 76949.

On May 5, 2015, an EF0 tornado struck Silver, which was a brief, intermittent tornado. On May 3, 2024, an EF2 tornado struck the community. The roof of a ranch house was ripped off, and a metal barn was completely destroyed, with building material tossed well downstream.

== Geography ==
Silver is located at the intersection of Texas State Highway 208 and Ranch to Market Road 2059, 17 mi (27 km) northwest of Robert Lee, 27 mi (43 km) southeast of Colorado City, and 65 mi (105 km) east of Big Spring in central Howard County.

== Education ==
Silver's first one-room schoolhouse was established in 1890. It was soon replaced by a $1,000,000 complex, which then became a hog farm. Today, the community is served by the Robert Lee Independent School District.
