= Girard, Texas =

- Census-designated place
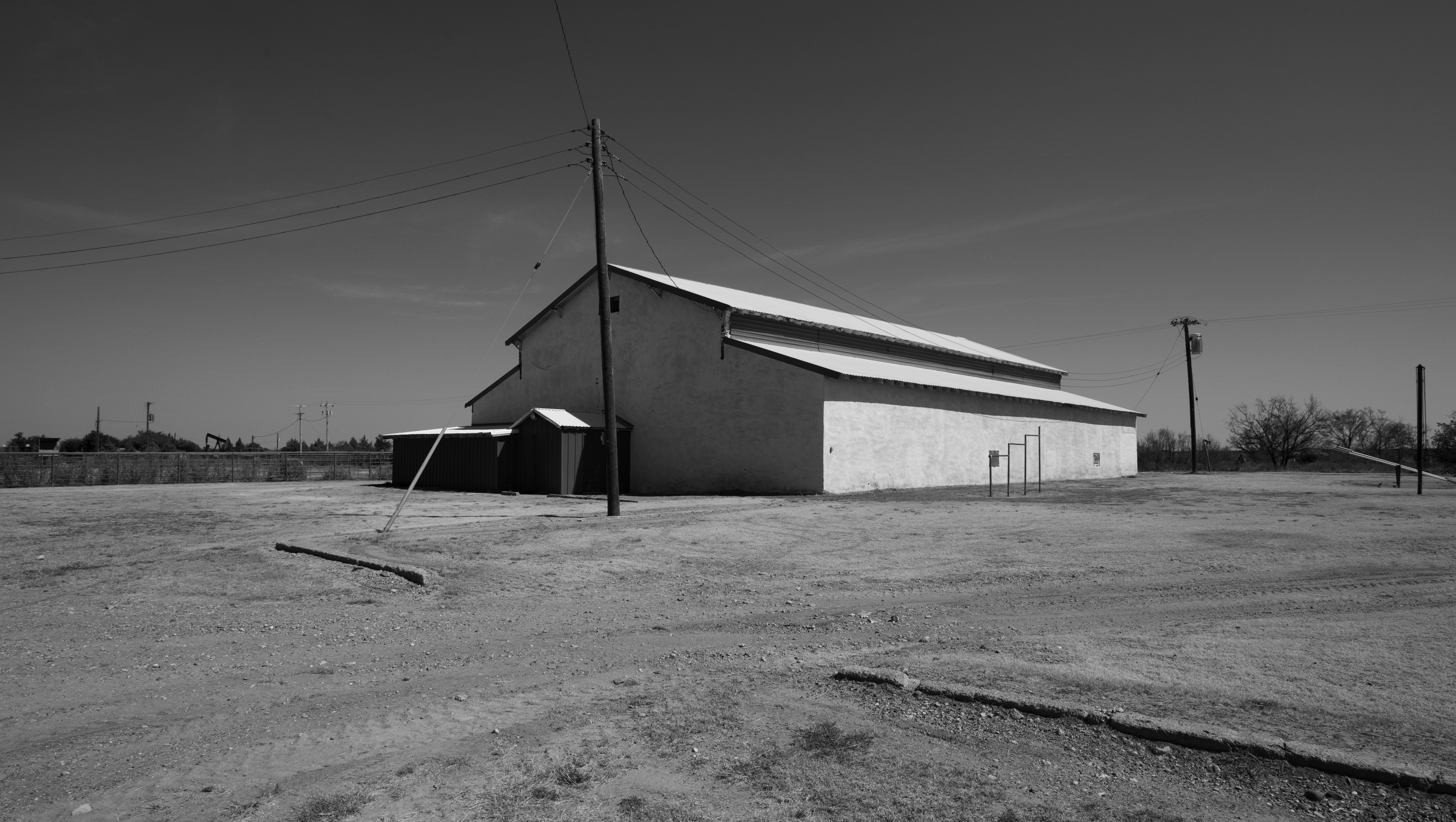
- School gymnasium in Girard

- Location within Texas Location within the United States
- Coordinates: 33°21′49″N 100°39′35″W
- Country: United States of America
- State: Texas
- County: Kent
- Region: West Texas
- Established: 1909

Area
  - Total: 1.45 sq mi (3.76 km^{2})
  - Land: 1.45 sq mi (3.76 km^{2})
  - Water: 0 sq mi (0.0 km^{2})
- Elevation: 2,133 ft (650 m)

Population (2020)
  - Total: 53
  - Density: 37/sq mi (14/km^{2})
- Time zone: UTC-6 (CST)
- ZIP Code: 79518
- Area code: 806
- FIPS code: 48-29612
- GNIS feature ID: 2408294

Girard is an unincorporated community and census-designated place (CDP) in Kent County, Texas, United States. The population was 53 at the 2020 census.

== Geography ==
Girard is located in northeastern Kent County along Texas State Highway 70. It is 9 miles (14 km) northwest of Jayton, the county seat, and 14 miles (23 km) southeast of Spur.

According to the United States Census Bureau, the Girard CDP has a total area of 1.5 square miles (3.8 km^{2}), all of it land.

== Demographics ==
Historical population
Census	Pop.	Note	%±
2000	62		—
2010	50		−19.4%
2020	53		6.0%
U.S. Decennial Census; 1850–1900 1910; 1920 1930 1940; 1950 1960 1970; 1980 1990 2000; 2010

Girard first appeared as a census designated place in the 2000 U.S. census.

=== 2020 census ===
Girard CDP, Texas – Racial and ethnic composition Note: the US Census treats Hispanic/Latino as an ethnic category. This table excludes Latinos from the racial categories and assigns them to a separate category. Hispanics/Latinos may be of any race.
Race / Ethnicity (NH = Non-Hispanic)	Pop 2000	Pop 2010	Pop 2020	% 2000	% 2010	% 2020
White alone (NH)	57	40	37	91.94%	80.00%	69.81%
Black or African American alone (NH)	0	1	0	0.00%	2.00%	0.00%
Native American or Alaska Native alone (NH)	0	0	0	0.00%	0.00%	0.00%
Asian alone (NH)	0	0	0	0.00%	0.00%	0.00%
Native Hawaiian or Pacific Islander alone (NH)	0	0	0	0.00%	0.00%	0.00%
Other race alone (NH)	0	0	0	0.00%	0.00%	0.00%
Mixed race or Multiracial (NH)	0	1	1	0.00%	2.00%	1.89%
Hispanic or Latino (any race)	5	8	15	8.06%	16.00%	28.30%
Total	62	50	53	100.00%	100.00%	100.00%

As of the census of 2000, there were 62 people, 21 households, and 16 families residing in the CDP. The population density was 42.4 inhabitants per square mile (16.4/km^{2}). There were 28 housing units at an average density of 19.2 per square mile (7.4/km^{2}). The racial makeup of the CDP was 91.94% White, 8.06% from other races. Hispanic or Latino of any race were 8.06% of the population.

There were 21 households, out of which 38.1% had children under the age of 18 living with them, 71.4% were married couples living together, 4.8% had a female householder with no husband present, and 23.8% were non-families. 23.8% of all households were made up of individuals, and 23.8% had someone living alone who was 65 years of age or older. The average household size was 2.95 and the average family size was 3.56.

In the CDP, the population was spread out, with 32.3% under the age of 18, 6.5% from 18 to 24, 22.6% from 25 to 44, 14.5% from 45 to 64, and 24.2% who were 65 years of age or older. The median age was 39 years. For every 100 females, there were 72.2 males. For every 100 females age 18 and over, there were 100.0 males.

The median income for a household in the CDP was $24,500, and the median income for a family was $30,417. Males had a median income of $23,333 versus $41,250 for females. The per capita income for the CDP was $9,653. There were 17.6% of families and 19.2% of the population living below the poverty line, including 22.2% of under eighteens and 80.0% of those over 64.

== Education ==
Girard is served by the Jayton-Girard Independent School District.
