= Jayton-Girard Independent School District =

School district in Texas

Coordinates: 33.2528°N 100.5822°W

Jayton-Girard Independent School District is a public school district based in Jayton, Texas (USA). It was created by the merger of the Girard School in nearby Girard with Jayton in 1969. Jayton-Girard ISD has one school Jayton School that serves students in grades pre-kindergarten through twelve.

== Academic achievement ==
In 2009, the school district was rated "recognized" by the Texas Education Agency.

== Special programs ==
=== Athletics ===
Jayton High School plays six-man football.

== See also ==
- List of school districts in Texas
- List of high schools in Texas
