= Clairemont, Texas =

- Ghost town
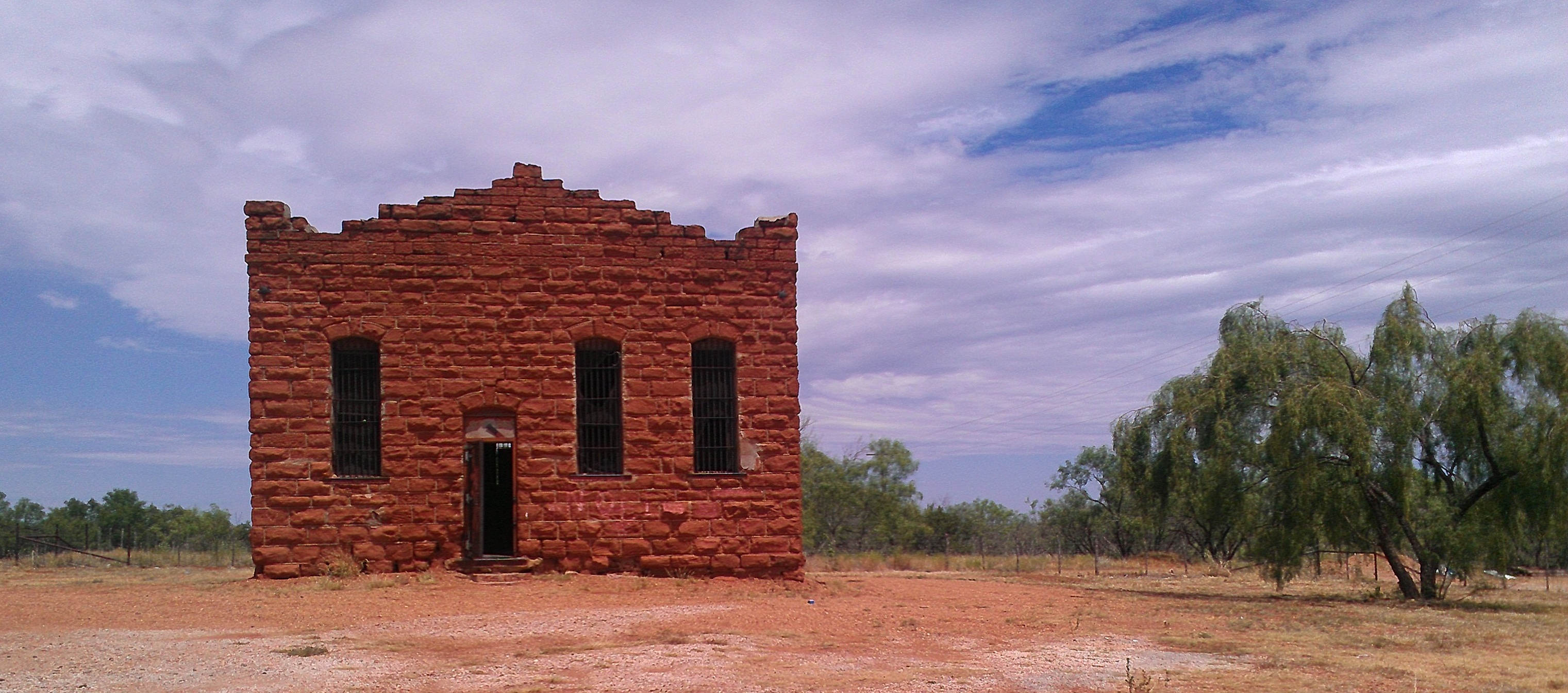
- The abandoned Kent County Jail is one of the few remaining buildings in Clairemont.

- Location of Clairemont in Texas and the United States Clairemont (the United States)
- Coordinates: 33°09′59″N 100°45′05″W
- Country: United States
- State: Texas
- County: Kent
- Elevation: 2,126 ft (648 m)
- Time zone: UTC-6 (Central (CST))
  - Summer (DST): UTC-5 (CDT)
- Area code: 806
- GNIS feature ID: 1354539

Clairemont is a ghost town in and the former county seat of Kent County, Texas, United States. It is at the intersection of U.S. Route 380 and Texas State Highway 208, 14 mi (23 km) southwest of Jayton and 43 mi (69 km) east of Post. Clairemont lies near the center of Kent County, and its estimated population as of the 2000 census was 15.

== History ==
Clairemont was established in 1892 to coincide with the organization of Kent County, with the understanding that it would serve as the county's seat of government. The new town was located on land owned by local rancher R.L. Rhomberg, who named the new town after his niece, Claire Becker.

In 1895, a sandstone courthouse and matching jail were constructed. By that time, the town had several stores, a bank, a newspaper, and a hotel. Although the Stamford and Northwestern Railway had bypassed Clairemont to the east by 1909, the town continued to prosper. Cotton farming and cattle ranching dominated the economy, and oil later became important. By the 1930s, the population exceeded 200. By the 1950s, however, the town had begun a steady decline, and by 1954, it had lost its title as county seat to nearby Jayton. The Clairemont courthouse burned shortly after the records were transferred to Jayton, but the bottom story was preserved as a community center. The remaining citizens soon began to move away, and the population dwindled to about 15 by the 2000s.

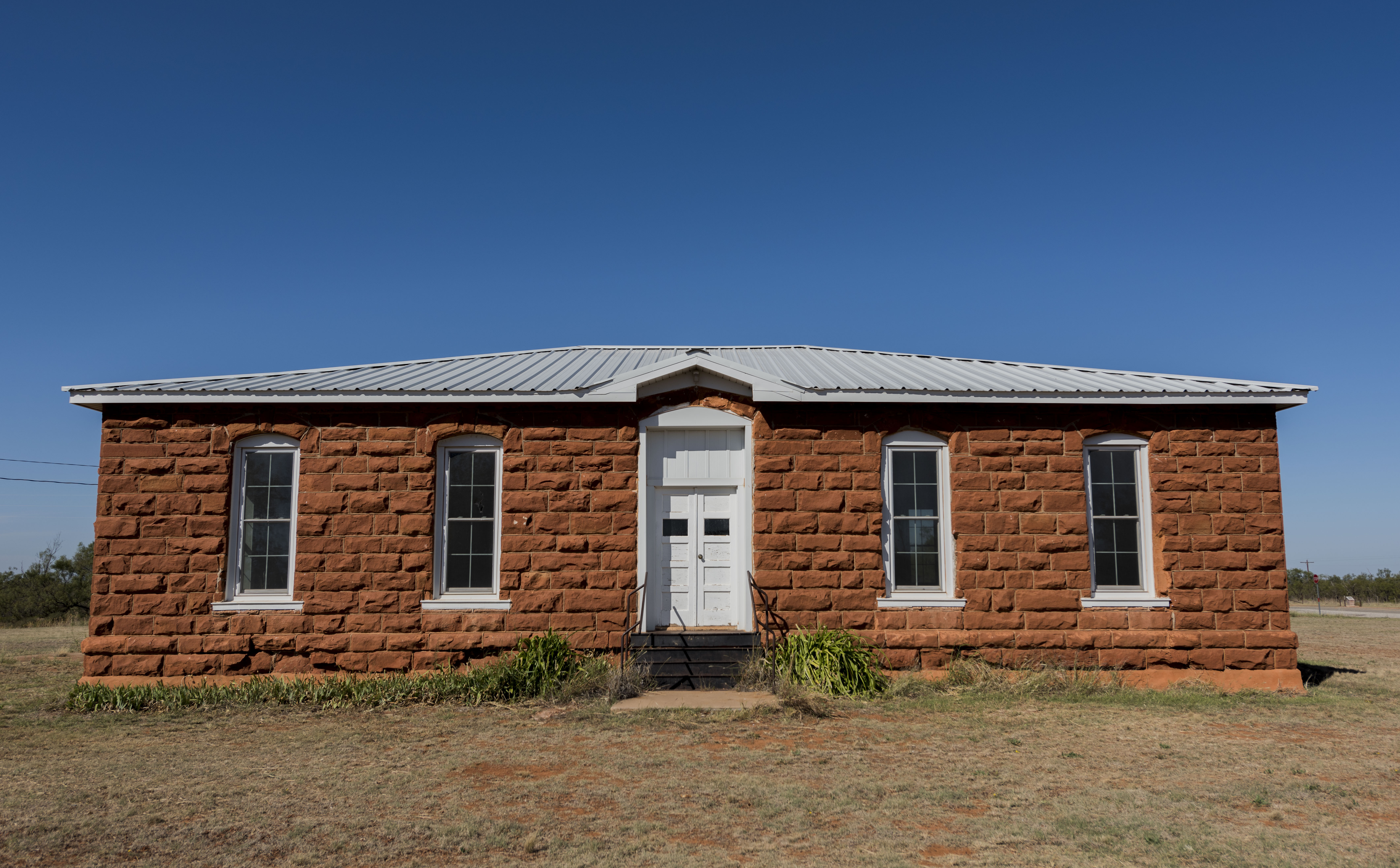
Original Kent County Courthouse

== See also ==
- List of ghost towns in Texas
- Close City, Texas
- Duffy's Peak
- Salt Fork Brazos River
- North Fork Double Mountain Fork Brazos River
- Rath City, Texas
