= Spur, Texas =

- City
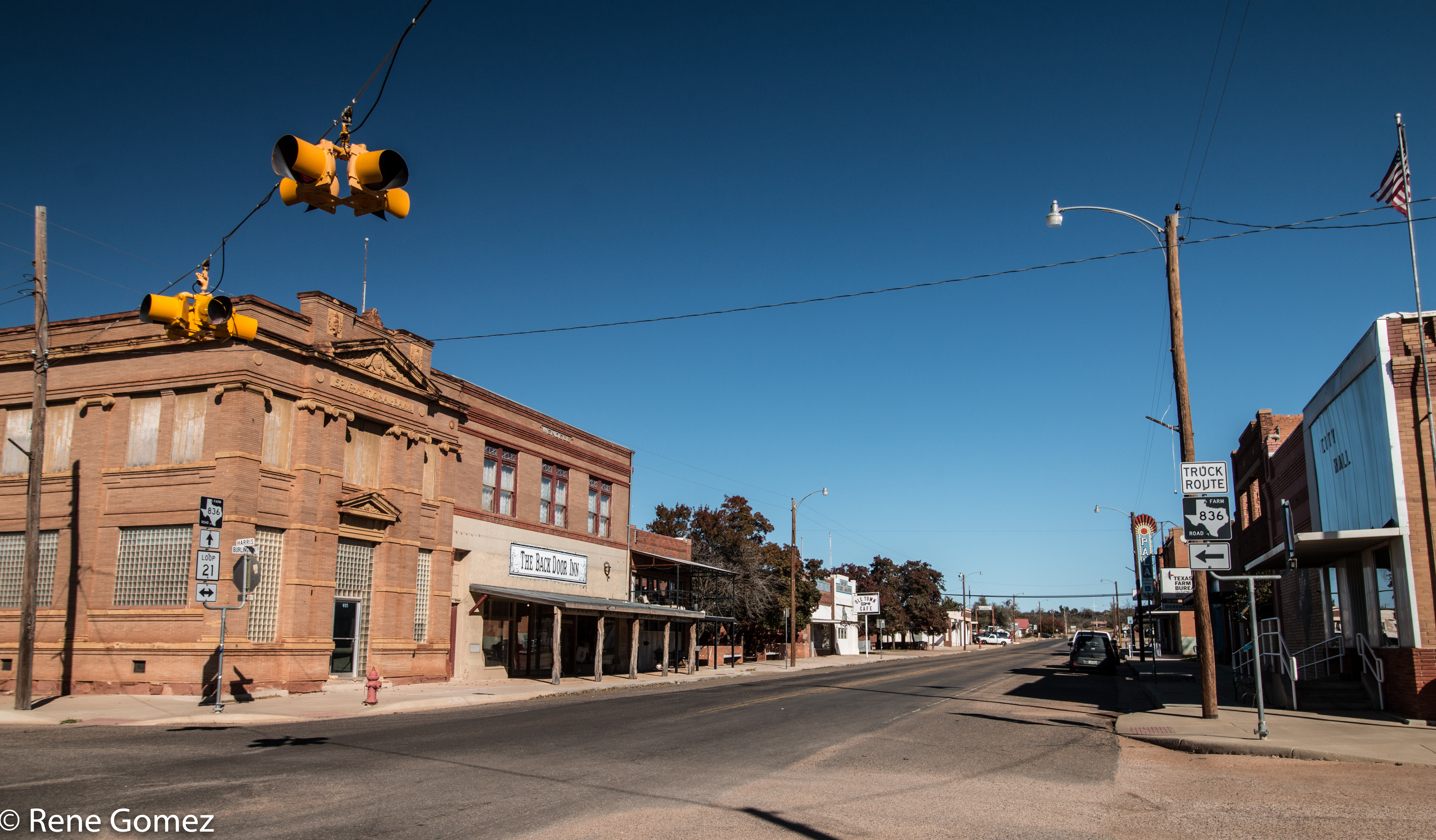

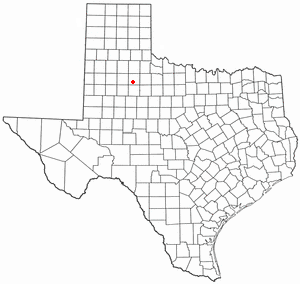
- Location of Spur, Texas

- Coordinates: 33°28′40″N 100°51′25″W
- Country: United States
- State: Texas
- County: Dickens

Area
  - Total: 1.60 sq mi (4.15 km^{2})
  - Land: 1.60 sq mi (4.15 km^{2})
  - Water: 0 sq mi (0.00 km^{2})
- Elevation: 2,287 ft (697 m)

Population (2020)
  - Total: 863
  - Density: 540/sq mi (208/km^{2})
- Time zone: UTC-6 (Central (CST))
  - Summer (DST): UTC-5 (CDT)
- ZIP code: 79370
- Area code: 806
- FIPS code: 48-69848
- GNIS feature ID: 1369049

Spur is a city in Dickens County, Texas, United States. The population was 863 at the 2020 census, down from 1,318 at the 2010 census. A city council resolution passed in July 2014 proclaimed Spur the "nation's first tiny house-friendly town."

== History ==
Spur began after E. P. Swenson and associates purchased Spur Ranch in 1907 and subdivided land for settlers.

The Colorado and Southern Railway then built the Stamford and Northwestern Railway northwest 82.2 miles from Stamford to the future site of Spur. On November 1, 1909, the first train, operated by the Wichita Valley Railway, arrived at the new depot, marking the opening of Spur.

Spur was incorporated in 1911.

== Geography ==
Spur is located in southern Dickens County at 33°28′40″N 100°51′25″W (33.477650, –100.857018). Texas State Highway 70 passes through the city, leading north 11 miles (18 km) to Dickens, the county seat, and southeast 24 miles (39 km) to Jayton.

According to the United States Census Bureau, the city has a total area of 1.6 square miles (4.2 km^{2}), all land.

=== Climate ===
According to the Köppen climate classification system, Spur has a semi-arid climate, BSk on climate maps.

Climate data for Spur, Texas (1991–2020 normals, extremes 1911–1964, 1986–present)
Month	Jan	Feb	Mar	Apr	May	Jun	Jul	Aug	Sep	Oct	Nov	Dec	Year
Record high °F (°C)	86 (30)	94 (34)	102 (39)	106 (41)	111 (44)	117 (47)	111 (44)	112 (44)	108 (42)	104 (40)	93 (34)	87 (31)	117 (47)
Mean daily maximum °F (°C)	55.5 (13.1)	59.5 (15.3)	68.0 (20.0)	76.6 (24.8)	84.4 (29.1)	91.6 (33.1)	94.9 (34.9)	94.1 (34.5)	86.0 (30.0)	76.8 (24.9)	65.0 (18.3)	56.0 (13.3)	75.7 (24.3)
Daily mean °F (°C)	41.0 (5.0)	44.5 (6.9)	52.5 (11.4)	60.7 (15.9)	70.1 (21.2)	78.2 (25.7)	81.5 (27.5)	80.6 (27.0)	72.7 (22.6)	62.1 (16.7)	50.4 (10.2)	42.0 (5.6)	61.4 (16.3)
Mean daily minimum °F (°C)	26.6 (−3.0)	29.4 (−1.4)	37.1 (2.8)	44.7 (7.1)	55.9 (13.3)	64.9 (18.3)	68.0 (20.0)	67.1 (19.5)	59.3 (15.2)	47.4 (8.6)	35.9 (2.2)	28.0 (−2.2)	47.0 (8.3)
Record low °F (°C)	−10 (−23)	−17 (−27)	−3 (−19)	20 (−7)	31 (−1)	43 (6)	51 (11)	45 (7)	32 (0)	13 (−11)	10 (−12)	−8 (−22)	−17 (−27)
Average precipitation inches (mm)	0.74 (19)	0.84 (21)	1.31 (33)	1.93 (49)	2.77 (70)	3.31 (84)	2.36 (60)	2.39 (61)	2.46 (62)	2.10 (53)	1.21 (31)	1.07 (27)	22.49 (571)
Average snowfall inches (cm)	0.4 (1.0)	1.3 (3.3)	0.0 (0.0)	0.1 (0.25)	0.0 (0.0)	0.0 (0.0)	0.0 (0.0)	0.0 (0.0)	0.0 (0.0)	0.0 (0.0)	0.4 (1.0)	0.7 (1.8)	2.9 (7.4)
Average precipitation days (≥ 0.01 in)	2.3	3.2	3.9	4.0	5.5	6.4	4.6	5.3	5.6	4.4	3.3	2.6	51.1
Average snowy days (≥ 0.1 in)	0.3	0.5	0.0	0.0	0.0	0.0	0.0	0.0	0.0	0.1	0.4	0.5	1.8
Source: NOAA

== Demographics ==
Historical population
Census	Pop.	Note	%±
1920	1,100		—
1930	1,899		72.6%
1940	2,136		12.5%
1950	2,183		2.2%
1960	2,170		−0.6%
1970	1,747		−19.5%
1980	1,690		−3.3%
1990	1,300		−23.1%
2000	1,088		−16.3%
2010	1,318		21.1%
2020	863		−34.5%
U.S. Decennial Census

=== 2020 census ===
As of the 2020 census, Spur had a population of 863, 378 households, and 195 families. The median age was 46.6 years. 23.5% of residents were under the age of 18 and 24.0% of residents were 65 years of age or older. For every 100 females there were 93.9 males, and for every 100 females age 18 and over there were 85.9 males age 18 and over.

0.0% of residents lived in urban areas, while 100.0% lived in rural areas.

There were 378 households in Spur, of which 31.0% had children under the age of 18 living in them. Of all households, 42.1% were married-couple households, 22.2% were households with a male householder and no spouse or partner present, and 29.9% were households with a female householder and no spouse or partner present. About 32.6% of all households were made up of individuals and 18.0% had someone living alone who was 65 years of age or older.

There were 547 housing units, of which 30.9% were vacant. The homeowner vacancy rate was 0.4% and the rental vacancy rate was 9.0%.

Racial composition as of the 2020 census
Race	Number	Percent
White	577	66.9%
Black or African American	24	2.8%
American Indian and Alaska Native	8	0.9%
Asian	2	0.2%
Native Hawaiian and Other Pacific Islander	2	0.2%
Some other race	124	14.4%
Two or more races	126	14.6%
Hispanic or Latino (of any race)	346	40.1%

=== 2000 census ===
As of the census of 2000, 1,088 people, 472 households, and 288 families resided in the city. The population density was 673.4 inhabitants per square mile (260.0/km^{2}). The 641 housing units averaged 396.7 per square mile (152.8/km^{2}). The racial makeup of the city was 72.52% White, 3.40% African American, 0.83% Native American, 0.18% Asian, 0.37% Pacific Islander, 21.14% from other races, and 1.56% from two or more races. About 31.25% of the population was Hispanic or Latino of any race.

Of the 472 households, 22.5% had children under the age of 18 living with them, 47.5% were married couples living together, 10.6% had a female householder with no husband present, and 38.8% were not families. Around 37.1% of all households were made up of individuals, and 20.8% had someone living alone who was 65 years of age or older. The average household size was 2.22 and the average family size was 2.89.

In the city, the population was distributed as 22.9% under the age of 18, 6.1% from 18 to 24, 22.3% from 25 to 44, 23.4% from 45 to 64, and 25.3% who were 65 years of age or older. The median age was 44 years. For every 100 females, there were 83.8 males. For every 100 females age 18 and over, there were 82.0 males.

The median income for a household in the city was $24,286, and for a family was $32,772. Males had a median income of $25,972 versus $18,631 for females. The per capita income for the city was $14,601. 19.8% of the population and 16.2% of families were below the poverty line. 24.8% of those under the age of 18 and 21.7% of those 65 and older were living below the poverty line.

== Education ==
The city of Spur is served by the Spur Independent School District.

The Texas Legislature designated the county as being in the Western Texas College District.

== Tiny houses ==
Spur's regulations are friendly to tiny houses, with some of the only requirements being a provision for a foundation to be laid, as well as plumbing and electrical wiring installed. Flush toilets are required, as well as a wood or metal frame. In general, experimental strawbale houses, yurts, or underground houses are not permitted. Lastly, house plans must be approved.

== Notable people ==
- Marshall Applewhite (1931–1997), the leader of the Heaven's Gate cult, was born in Spur. He died in the group's mass suicide of 1997
- Raymond Beadle (1943–2014), a drag-racing driver and member of the Motorsports Hall of Fame of America, was born in Spur
- Aaron Latham (1943-2022), a Spur native, wrote the script of the 1980 film Urban Cowboy. In the story line, the protagonist, Bud Davis (played by John Travolta), is said to have been from Spur
- Red McCombs (1927-2023), a San Antonio businessman who owned the NBA's San Antonio Spurs and Denver Nuggets as well as the NFL's Minnesota Vikings, was born in Spur, and named the Spurs NBA team after the city he grew up in.
- Jesse Powell Played for Miami Dolphins; graduated from Spur High School
