= Jayton, Texas =

- City
- Jayton, Texas
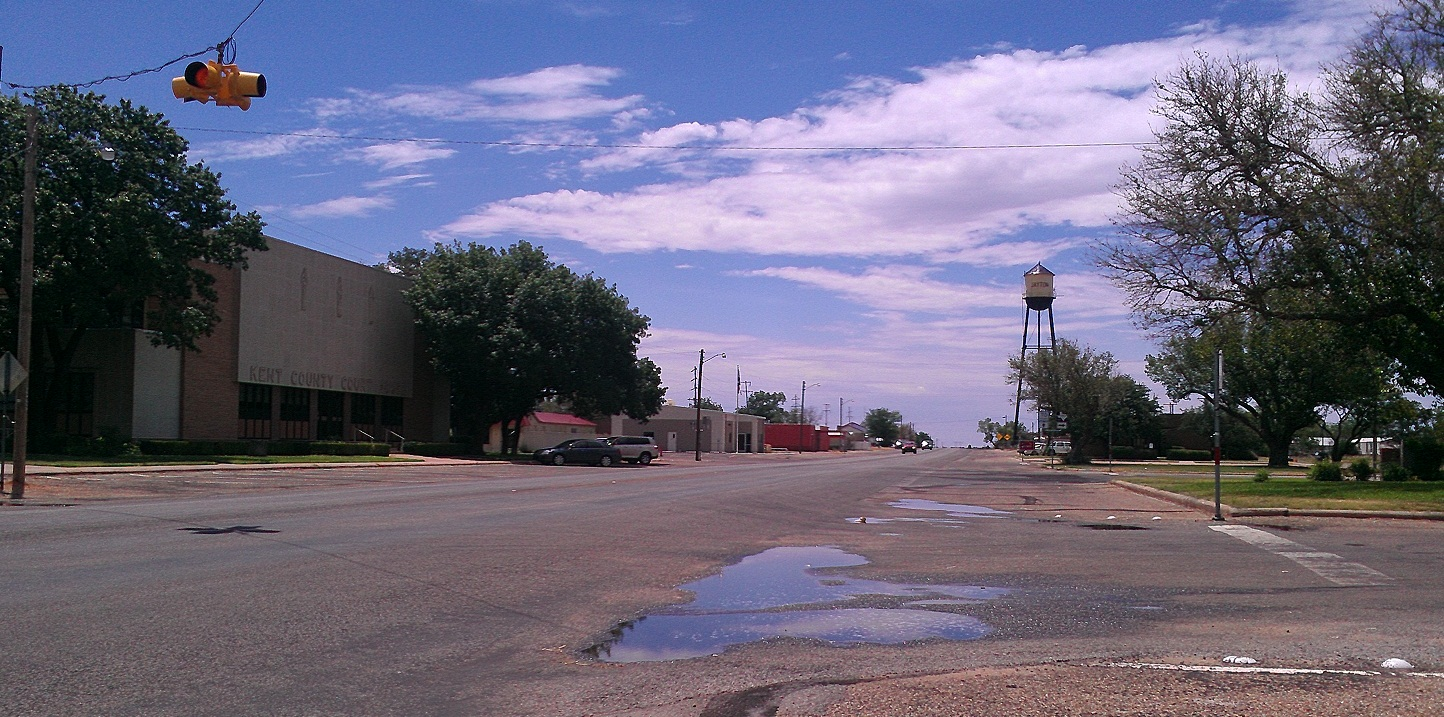
- Jayton's water tower and the Kent County Court in 2012
- Motto: "Where pride makes the difference!”
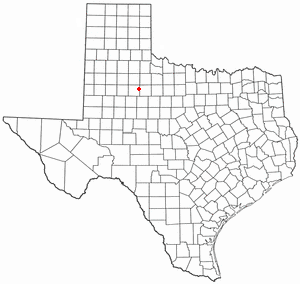
- Location of Jayton, Texas

- Coordinates: 33°15′00″N 100°34′28″W
- Country: United States
- State: Texas
- County: Kent

Area
  - Total: 1.69 sq mi (4.39 km^{2})
  - Land: 1.69 sq mi (4.39 km^{2})
  - Water: 0 sq mi (0.00 km^{2})
- Elevation: 2,001 ft (610 m)

Population (2020)
  - Total: 511
  - Density: 295.9/sq mi (114.23/km^{2})
- Time zone: UTC-6 (Central (CST))
  - Summer (DST): UTC-5 (CDT)
- ZIP code: 79528
- Area code: 806
- FIPS code: 48-37468
- GNIS feature ID: 2410136

Jayton is a city in and the county seat of Kent County, Texas, United States. It is located in the northeastern portion of the county, and the population was 511 as of the 2020 census.

== History ==
Jayton's history begins in the 1880s. Originally known as "Jay Flat", it was established two miles northeast of its present location and named after a local ranching family. A post office was granted in 1886, and Daniel Jay served as the community's first postmaster. In 1907, the townsite was moved to its present location for improved proximity to rail service, and it was officially renamed "Jayton" later that same year. The community's first newspaper, the Jayton Herald, was established the following year, and the city incorporated in February 1910. By 1925, Jayton was home to 750 residents.

From the community's inception, the local economy had originally been supported mainly by the cotton industry, but the Dust Bowl of the 1930s had a dire effect on production. The community's economy was stabilized by the discovery of oil later that same decade, and while its population never exceeded 750, Jayton remained stable throughout the Great Depression. In 1954, following a lengthy and heated court battle, the city wrested the title of county seat from the declining nearby community of Clairemont, and in 1957, a courthouse was constructed. Jayton's population remained around 600 from the 1950s through the 1980 census before declining to 513 in 1990 and 441 in 2000, but a resurgence in the local oil industry led to a rebound, and the 2010 census counted 534 residents.

== Media ==
Jayton is served by The Texas Spur newspaper in Spur, Texas.

== Geography ==
Jayton is located in eastern Kent County. U.S. Route 380 touches the southern border of the city; the highway leads southeast 24 miles (39 km) to Aspermont and southwest 13 miles (21 km) to Clairemont. Texas State Highway 70 is Jayton's Main Street and leads northwest 24 miles (39 km) to Spur. The closest large cities are Lubbock, 93 miles (150 km) to the northwest, and Abilene, 84 miles (135 km) to the southeast.

According to the United States Census Bureau, Jayton has a total area of 1.7 square miles (4.4 km^{2}), all land.

Kent County Airport is south of the city. The airport has one asphalt runway 3,300 feet (1,000 m) in length. The nearest airport with commercial service is approximately 100 miles away, in Lubbock.

=== Climate ===
According to the Köppen climate classification system, Jayton has a semiarid climate, BSk on climate maps.

Climate data for Jayton, Texas (1991–2020 normals, extremes 1962–present)
Month	Jan	Feb	Mar	Apr	May	Jun	Jul	Aug	Sep	Oct	Nov	Dec	Year
Record high °F (°C)	87 (31)	93 (34)	99 (37)	108 (42)	111 (44)	116 (47)	114 (46)	113 (45)	110 (43)	105 (41)	91 (33)	87 (31)	116 (47)
Mean maximum °F (°C)	77.6 (25.3)	81.8 (27.7)	89.0 (31.7)	94.6 (34.8)	99.9 (37.7)	102.8 (39.3)	104.2 (40.1)	103.7 (39.8)	99.1 (37.3)	93.6 (34.2)	84.2 (29.0)	77.7 (25.4)	106.6 (41.4)
Mean daily maximum °F (°C)	56.6 (13.7)	60.7 (15.9)	69.1 (20.6)	78.1 (25.6)	85.6 (29.8)	92.9 (33.8)	96.5 (35.8)	95.8 (35.4)	87.8 (31.0)	78.3 (25.7)	66.2 (19.0)	57.2 (14.0)	77.1 (25.1)
Daily mean °F (°C)	42.2 (5.7)	45.9 (7.7)	54.2 (12.3)	62.7 (17.1)	71.7 (22.1)	79.9 (26.6)	83.6 (28.7)	82.7 (28.2)	74.8 (23.8)	64.0 (17.8)	52.1 (11.2)	43.2 (6.2)	63.1 (17.3)
Mean daily minimum °F (°C)	27.9 (−2.3)	31.1 (−0.5)	39.2 (4.0)	47.3 (8.5)	57.8 (14.3)	66.9 (19.4)	70.7 (21.5)	69.6 (20.9)	61.8 (16.6)	49.8 (9.9)	38.0 (3.3)	29.2 (−1.6)	49.1 (9.5)
Mean minimum °F (°C)	14.2 (−9.9)	16.9 (−8.4)	22.5 (−5.3)	31.5 (−0.3)	42.3 (5.7)	57.4 (14.1)	63.1 (17.3)	62.2 (16.8)	48.0 (8.9)	32.8 (0.4)	21.7 (−5.7)	15.2 (−9.3)	10.2 (−12.1)
Record low °F (°C)	−2 (−19)	−6 (−21)	6 (−14)	24 (−4)	31 (−1)	44 (7)	54 (12)	54 (12)	34 (1)	16 (−9)	10 (−12)	−5 (−21)	−6 (−21)
Average precipitation inches (mm)	0.87 (22)	1.12 (28)	1.38 (35)	1.77 (45)	3.12 (79)	3.28 (83)	2.46 (62)	2.13 (54)	2.63 (67)	2.12 (54)	1.42 (36)	0.98 (25)	23.28 (591)
Average snowfall inches (cm)	0.7 (1.8)	1.9 (4.8)	0.1 (0.25)	0.0 (0.0)	0.0 (0.0)	0.0 (0.0)	0.0 (0.0)	0.0 (0.0)	0.0 (0.0)	0.0 (0.0)	0.8 (2.0)	0.6 (1.5)	4.1 (10)
Average precipitation days (≥ 0.01 in)	2.2	3.1	3.2	3.1	4.9	5.1	4.0	3.7	4.3	3.5	2.4	2.3	41.8
Average snowy days (≥ 0.1 in)	0.4	0.6	0.1	0.0	0.0	0.0	0.0	0.0	0.0	0.1	0.3	0.4	1.9
Source: NOAA

== Demographics ==
Historical population
Census	Pop.	Note	%±
1910	314		—
1930	623		—
1940	770		23.6%
1950	635		−17.5%
1960	649		2.2%
1970	703		8.3%
1980	638		−9.2%
1990	608		−4.7%
2000	513		−15.6%
2010	534		4.1%
2020	511		−4.3%
U.S. Decennial Census

=== 2020 census ===
Note: the US Census treats Hispanic/Latino as an ethnic category. This table excludes Latinos from the racial categories and assigns them to a separate category. Hispanics/Latinos can be of any race.

As of the 2020 census, Jayton had a population of 511, 197 households, and 108 families. The median age was 46.7 years; 21.9% of residents were under the age of 18 and 31.9% of residents were 65 years of age or older. For every 100 females there were 90.0 males, and for every 100 females age 18 and over there were 82.2 males age 18 and over.

There were 197 households in Jayton, of which 37.6% had children under the age of 18 living in them. Of all households, 47.7% were married-couple households, 16.8% were households with a male householder and no spouse or partner present, and 34.0% were households with a female householder and no spouse or partner present. About 29.4% of all households were made up of individuals and 19.3% had someone living alone who was 65 years of age or older.

There were 241 housing units, of which 18.3% were vacant. The homeowner vacancy rate was 0.7% and the rental vacancy rate was 7.5%.

0.0% of residents lived in urban areas, while 100.0% lived in rural areas.

Racial composition as of the 2020 census
Race	Number	Percent
White	455	89.0%
Black or African American	2	0.4%
American Indian and Alaska Native	5	1.0%
Asian	0	0.0%
Native Hawaiian and Other Pacific Islander	0	0.0%
Some other race	26	5.1%
Two or more races	23	4.5%
Hispanic or Latino (of any race)	61	11.9%

=== 2000 census ===
As of the census of 2000, 513 people, 209 households, and 144 families resided in the city. The population density was 301.6 inhabitants per square mile (116.4/km^{2}). The 277 housing units averaged 162.9/sq mi (62.9/km^{2}). The racial makeup of the city was 96.69% White, 0.19% African American, 0.39% Native American, 2.53% from other races, and 0.19% from two or more races. Hispanics or Latinos of any race were 10.92% of the population.

Of the 209 households, 25.8% had children under the age of 18 living with them, 59.3% were married couples living together, 6.2% had a female householder with no husband present, and 31.1% were not families. About 29.2% of all households were made up of individuals, and 15.8% had someone living alone who was 65 years of age or older. The average household size was 2.27 and the average family size was 2.81.

In the city, the population was distributed as 19.7% under the age of 18, 4.9% from 18 to 24, 20.7% from 25 to 44, 27.9% from 45 to 64, and 26.9% who were 65 years of age or older. The median age was 50 years. For every 100 females, there were 84.5 males. For every 100 females age 18 and over, there were 83.1 males.

The median income for a household in the city was $32,396, and for a family was $39,375. Males had a median income of $25,000 versus $21,875 for females. The per capita income for the city was $17,314. About 9.6% of families and 8.8% of the population were below the poverty line, including 5.5% of those under age 18 and 1.0% of those age 65 or over.

== Education ==
The city is served by the Jayton-Girard Independent School District, and the local high school is Jayton High School.

The Texas Legislature designated the county as being in the Western Texas College District.

== Notable people ==
- Jim W. Corder (1929–1998), a scholar of rhetoric.
- Weldon Myrick (1938-2014), American Steel Guitar player.
