= Western Texas College =

Community college in Snyder, Texas, U.S.

- Type: Public community college
- Established: 1969; 57 years ago
- President: Laurie Sharp
- Undergraduates: 3,164
- Location: Snyder, Texas, United States; 32.678768°N 100.913936°W
- Colors: Blue and Green
- Nickname: Westerners
- Website: www.wtc.edu

Western Texas College (WTC) is a public community college in Snyder, Texas, United States. It was established in 1969 and has two downtown Snyder locations in addition to the main campus. With an enrollment around 2,300, Western Texas College has an extensive distance-learning department, provides dual-credit courses to 43 area high schools, and provides college-level coursework to inmates in three prisons in the West Texas area.

As defined by the Texas Legislature, the official Western Texas College service area encompasses Borden, Dickens, Fisher, Jones, Kent, Mitchell, Nolan, Runnels, Scurry, and Stonewall Counties.

== Academics ==
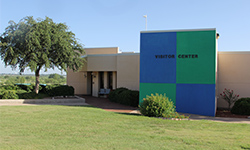
The Visitor Center at Western Texas College

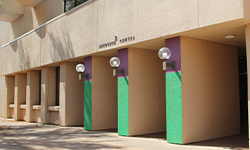
The Western Texas College Learning Resource Center/Library

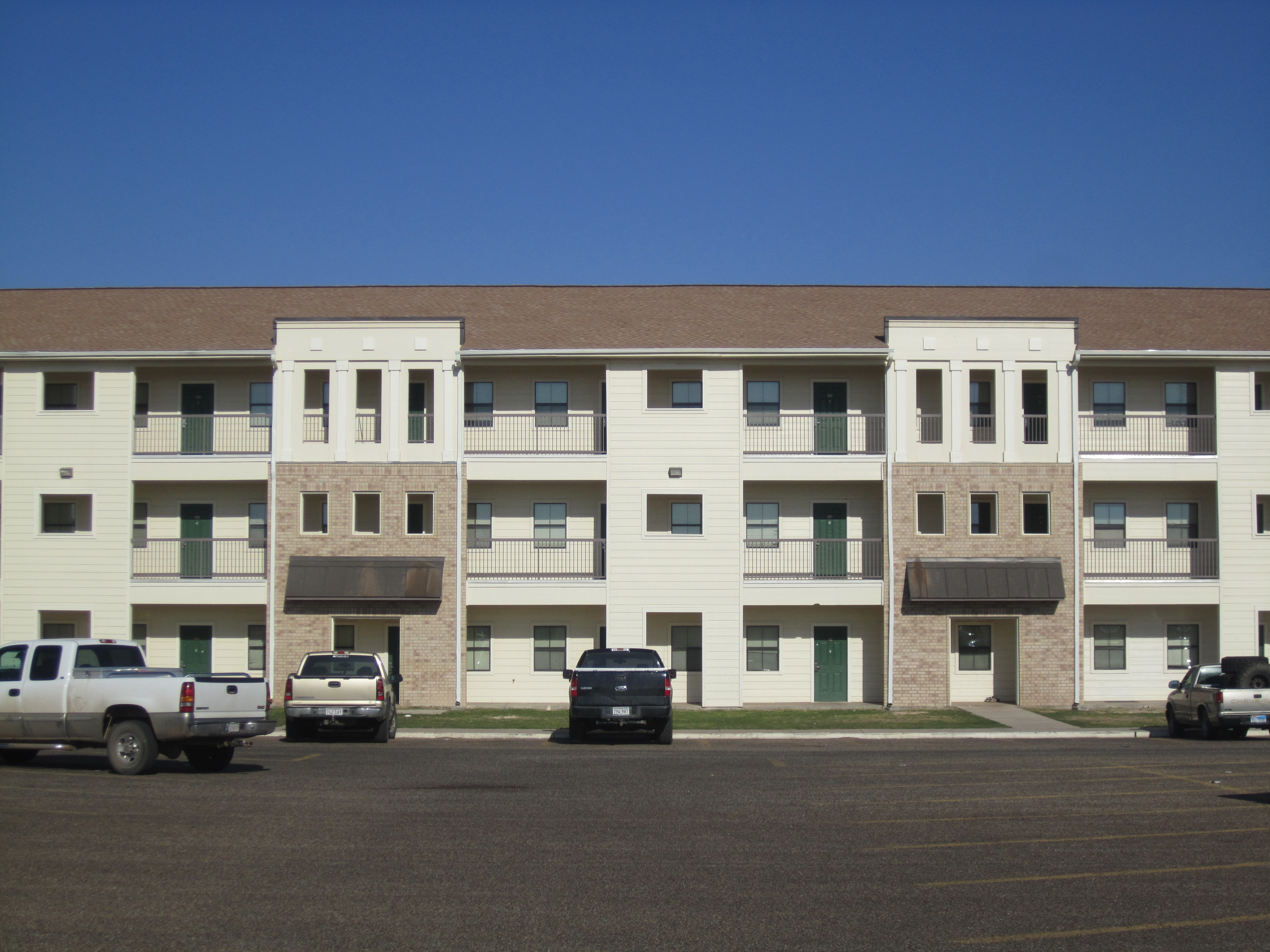
Residence hall at Western Texas College

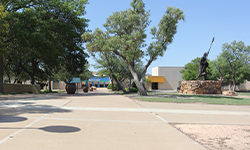
The front of the Western Texas College campus

Western Texas College offers the associate of arts (AA) degree, the associate of science (AS) degree, the associate of applied science (AAS) degree, and the associate of arts in teaching (AAT) degree.

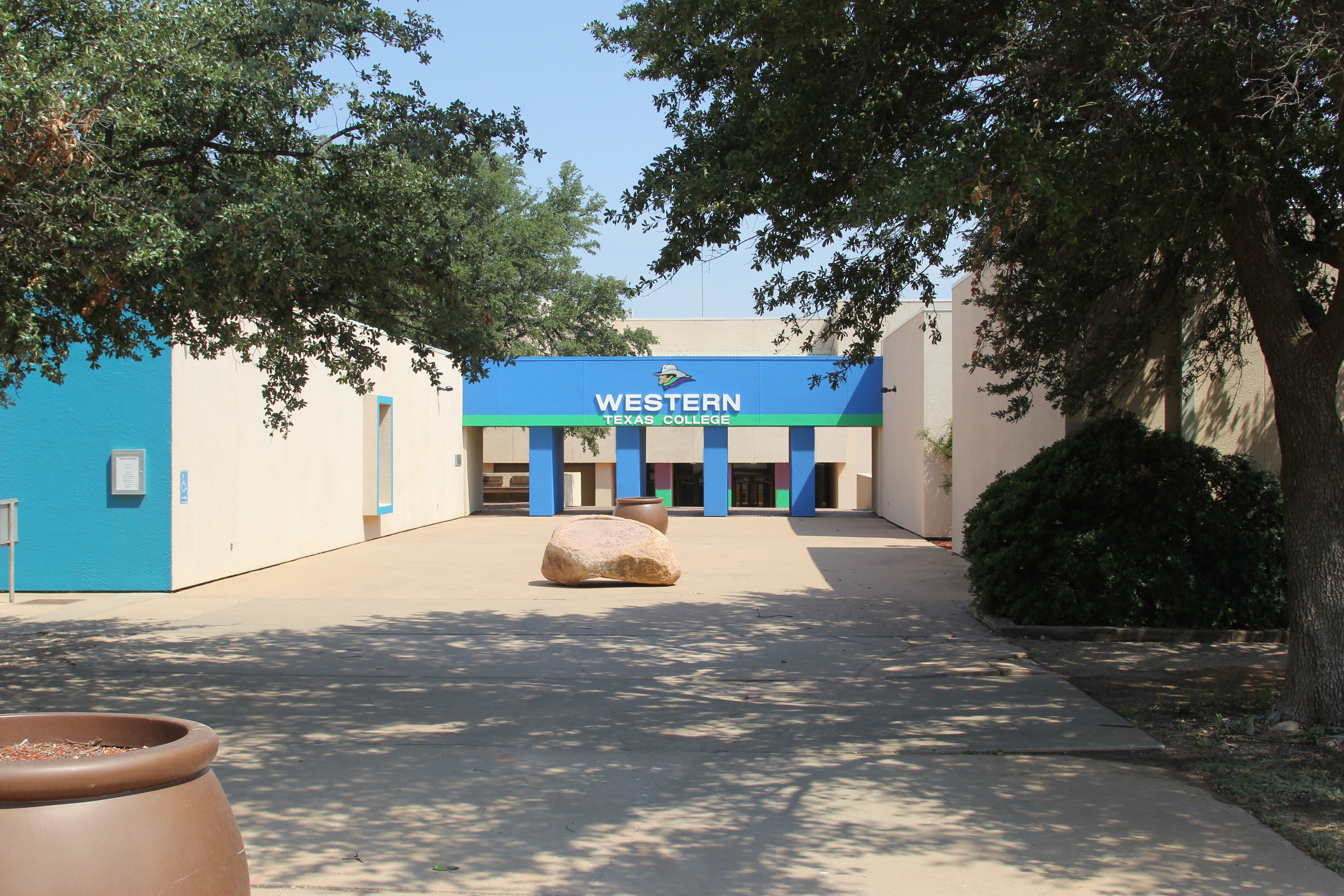
The entrance to Western Texas College

== Athletics ==
Western Texas College is part of the Western Junior College Athletic Conference and the National Junior College Athletic Association Region 5. Competing athletic teams include:

- Baseball
- Men's and women's basketball
- Cross country
- Men's and women's golf
- Rodeo
- Men's and women's soccer
- Softball
- Track and field
- Volleyball

=== Sports facilities ===
==== The WTC Coliseum ====
Western Texas College assumed ownership and operations of the Scurry County Coliseum in 2008. Renamed "The Coliseum", the 3,400-seat arena received a facelift thanks to a $500,000 donation from wind-energy company, Invenergy. In addition to all college basketball home games played on Invenergy Court, The Coliseum is host to many annual events, including the West Texas Western Swing Festival held every year in June.

==== United Field ====
Home of the Lady Westerners softball team, United Field is also host to tournaments for high schools and colleges.

==== Westerner Field ====
Westerner Field is home to the Westerner baseball squad and local and regional baseball tournaments, including the annual Snyder High School tournament. The Westerners had their first winning season in the '10-'11 year, posting a 37–17 record.

==== Weaver Field Soccer Complex ====
Weaver Field, the WTC Soccer Complex, includes a full-sized regulation soccer pitch and three practice fields. Plans include adding a 400-meter track to the complex. In addition to home games for the WTC men's and women's soccer teams, the field hosts many local soccer events for Snyder schools.

== WTC campus expansion ==
The WTC campus expanded by nearly 100 acres after Texas clothing and boot magnate James Cavender donated property adjacent to the campus. This property currently houses the WTC Soccer Complex, Cavender Energy field lab, and a rugged outdoor cross-country track used for local and regional cross-country track events.

== Notable alumni ==
- J. D. Sheffield, physician and medical director in Gatesville and a Republican member of the Texas House of Representatives from Coryell County, began his higher education at WTC.
