= Buford, Mitchell County, Texas =

- Unincorporated community
- Location within Texas Location within the United States
- Coordinates: 32.4615053°N 100.8567805°W
- Country: United States
- State: Texas
- County: Mitchell
- Elevation: 2,162 ft (659 m)
- Time zone: UTC-6 (Central (CST))
  - Summer (DST): UTC-5 (CDT)
- Area code: 325
- GNIS feature ID: 1331582

Buford is an unincorporated community in Mitchell County, in the U.S. state of Texas. According to the Handbook of Texas, the community had a population of 25 in 2000.

== Geography ==
Buford is located at the intersection of Texas State Highway 208 and Farm to Market Road 1982, 5 mi (8.0 km) north of Colorado City, 34 mi (55 km) west of Sweetwater, and 43 mi (69 km) east of Big Spring in north-central Mitchell County.

=== Climate ===
According to the Köppen Climate Classification system, Buford has a semi-arid climate, abbreviated "BSk" on climate maps.

== Education ==
Buford had its own school in 1947. Today the community is served by the Colorado Independent School District.
