= Texas's 24th Senate district =

American legislative district

Texas's 24th State Senate district
Senator
Pete Flores; R–Pleasanton
- Demographics: 61.6% White; 13.9% Black; 21.3% Hispanic; 3.2% Asian
- Population: 857,714

District 24 of the Texas Senate is a senatorial district that currently serves all of Bandera, Bell, Burnet, Coryell, Gillespie, Kerr, Kimble, Lampasas, Llano, Medina, and Sutton counties and portions of Atascosa and Williamson counties in the U.S. state of Texas.

The current senator from District 24 is Pete Flores.

== Biggest cities in the district ==
District 24 has a population of 798,189 with 596,939 that is at voting age from the 2010 census.

	Name	County	Pop. (Note: Population is based on the number of people in the district in that city, not the overall population of that city)
1	Killeen	Bell	127,921
2	Abilene	Taylor	78,717
3	Temple	Bell	66,102
4	Copperas Cove	Bell/Coryell/Lampasas	32,032
5	Harker Heights	Bell	26,700

== Election history ==
Election history of District 24 from 1992. (Note: Uncontested primary elections are not shown.)

=== 2022 ===
Texas general election, 2022: Senate District 24
Party	Candidate	Votes	%	±%
Republican	Pete Flores	187,598	64.32	−5.22
Democratic	Kathy Jones-Hospod	104,063	35.68	+5.22
Turnout		291,661	100.00	
Republican hold				

=== 2020 ===
Texas general election, 2020: Senate District 24
Party	Candidate	Votes	%	±%
Republican	Dawn Buckingham (Incumbent)	264,517	69.54	−2.85
Democratic	Clayton Tucker	115,853	30.46	+2.85
Turnout		380,370	100.00	
Republican hold				

=== 2016 ===
Texas general election, 2016: Senate District 24
Party	Candidate	Votes	%	±%
Republican	Dawn Buckingham (Incumbent)	214,568	72.39	−27.61
Democratic	Virginia "Jennie Lou" Leeder	81,836	27.61	+27.61
Turnout		296,404		
Republican hold				

=== 2012 ===
Texas general election, 2012: Senate District 24
Party	Candidate	Votes	%	±%
Republican	Troy Fraser (Incumbent)	209,319	100.00	+14.53
Turnout		209,319		
Republican hold				

=== 2008 ===
Texas general election, 2008: Senate District 24
Party	Candidate	Votes	%	±%
Republican	Troy Fraser (Incumbent)	197,125	85.47	−14.53
Libertarian	Bill Oliver	33,518	14.53	+14.53
Turnout		230,643		
Republican hold				

=== 2004 ===
Texas general election, 2004: Senate District 24
Party	Candidate	Votes	%	±%
Republican	Troy Fraser (Incumbent)	189,778	100.00	+9.53
Majority		189,778	100.00	+19.06
Turnout		189,778		+40.32
Republican hold				

=== 2002 ===
Texas general election, 2002: Senate District 24
Party	Candidate	Votes	%	±%
Republican	Troy Fraser (Incumbent)	122,355	90.47	−9.53
Libertarian	Steve Kirby	12,887	9.53	+9.53
Majority		109,468	80.94	−19.06
Turnout		135,242		+3.31
Republican hold				

=== 2000 ===
Texas general election, 2000: Senate District 24
Party	Candidate	Votes	%	±%
Republican	Troy Fraser (Incumbent)	130,913	100.00	+48.15
Majority		130,913	100.00	+96.30
Turnout		130,913		−21.82
Republican hold				

=== 1996 ===
Texas general election, 1996: Senate District 24
Party	Candidate	Votes	%	±%
Republican	Troy Fraser	86,828	51.85	+5.20
Democratic	Rick Rhodes	80,632	48.15	−5.20
Majority		6,196	3.70	−3.01
Turnout		167,460		+32.29
Republican gain from Democratic				

Republican primary, 1996: Senate District 24
Candidate		Votes	%	±
	Bob Barina	4,204	18.91	
✓	Troy Fraser	18,028	81.09	
Majority		13,824	62.18	
Turnout				

=== 1994 ===
Texas general election, 1994: Senate District 24
Party	Candidate	Votes	%	±%
Democratic	Bill Sims (Incumbent)	67,536	53.35	−46.65
Republican	Hugh Shine	59,048	46.65	+46.65
Majority		8,848	6.71	−93.29
Turnout		126,584		+14.52
Democratic hold				

=== 1992 ===
Texas general election, 1992: Senate District 24
Party	Candidate	Votes	%	±%
Democratic	Frank Madla	110,534	100.00	
Majority		110,534	100.00	
Turnout		110,534		
Democratic hold				

== District officeholders ==
Legislature	Senator, District 24	Counties in District
4	Israel B. Bigelow	Cameron, Starr.
5	Guy Morrison Bryan	Brazoria, Fort Bend, Matagorda, Wharton.
6	Guy Morrison Bryan	Brazoria, Fort Bend, Matagorda, Wharton.
7	George E. Quinan	Brazoria, Fort Bend, Matagorda, Wharton.
8	George E. Quinan	Brazoria, Fort Bend, Matagorda, Wharton.
9	George Preston Finlay; Samuel Addison White	Calhoun, DeWitt, Jackson, Lavaca, Victoria.
10	Samuel Addison White	Calhoun, DeWitt, Jackson, Lavaca, Victoria.
11	Jacob B. Reid	Calhoun, DeWitt, Jackson, Lavaca, Victoria.
12	Bolivar Jackson Pridgen	Bee, Calhoun, DeWitt, Goliad, Jackson, Refugio, San Patricio, Victoria.
13	George Preston Finlay	Aransas, Bee, Calhoun, DeWitt, Goliad, Jackson, Refugio, San Patricio, Victoria.
14	William R. Friend	Aransas, Bee, Calhoun, DeWitt, Goliad, Jackson, Karnes, Live Oak, Refugio, San Patricio, Victoria.
15	John D. Stephens	Bosque, Brown, Callahan, Coleman, Comanche, Coryell, Eastland, Erath, Hamilton, Hood, Jones, Palo Pinto, Runnels, Shackelford, Somervell, Stephens, Taylor.
16	Jewett H. Davenport	Bosque, Brown, Callahan, Coleman, Comanche, Coryell, Eastland, Erath, Hamilton, Hood, Jones, Palo Pinto, Runnels, Shackelford, Somervell, Stephens, Taylor.
17	Jewett H. Davenport	Bosque, Brown, Callahan, Coleman, Comanche, Coryell, Eastland, Erath, Hamilton, Hood, Jones, Palo Pinto, Runnels, Shackelford, Somervell, Stephens, Taylor.
18	Alexander Watkins Terrell	Burnet, Travis, Williamson.
19	George Washington Glasscock, Jr.	Burnet, Travis, Williamson.
20	George Washington Glasscock, Jr.	Burnet, Travis, Williamson.
21	George Washington Glasscock, Jr.	Burnet, Travis, Williamson.
22	George Washington Glasscock, Jr.	Burnet, Travis, Williamson.
23	Perry J. Lewis	Bandera, Bexar, Gillespie, Kendall, Kerr, Medina.
24	Perry J. Lewis	Bandera, Bexar, Gillespie, Kendall, Kerr, Medina.
25	Perry J. Lewis	Bandera, Bexar, Gillespie, Kendall, Kerr, Medina.
26	Perry J. Lewis	Bandera, Bexar, Gillespie, Kendall, Kerr, Medina.
27	Theodore Harris	Bandera, Bexar, Gillespie, Kendall, Kerr, Medina.
28	Marshall Hicks	Bandera, Bexar, Gillespie, Kendall, Kerr.
29	Marshall Hicks	Bandera, Bexar, Gillespie, Kendall, Kerr.
30	Robert B. Green	Bandera, Bexar, Gillespie, Kendall, Kerr.
31	Robert B. Green; Julius Real	Bandera, Bexar, Gillespie, Kendall, Kerr.
32	Julius Real	Bandera, Bexar, Gillespie, Kendall, Kerr.
33	Julius Real	Bandera, Bexar, Gillespie, Kendall, Kerr.
34	Carlos Bee	Bandera, Bexar, Gillespie, Kendall, Kerr.
35	Carlos Bee	Bandera, Bexar, Gillespie, Kendall, Kerr, Real.
36	Harry Hertzberg	Bandera, Bexar, Gillespie, Kendall, Kerr, Real.
37	Harry Hertzberg	Bandera, Bexar, Gillespie, Kendall, Kerr, Real.
38	Thomas H. Ridgeway	Bandera, Bexar, Gillespie, Kendall, Kerr, Real.
39	Jesse R. Smith	Callahan, Eastland, Fisher, Haskell, Jones, Mitchell, Nolan, Scurry, Shackelford, Stephens, Taylor, Throckmorton.
40	Jesse R. Smith	Callahan, Eastland, Fisher, Haskell, Jones, Mitchell, Nolan, Scurry, Shackelford, Stephens, Taylor, Throckmorton.
41	Oliver C. Cunningham	Callahan, Eastland, Fisher, Haskell, Jones, Mitchell, Nolan, Scurry, Shackelford, Stephens, Taylor, Throckmorton.
42	Oliver C. Cunningham	Callahan, Eastland, Fisher, Haskell, Jones, Mitchell, Nolan, Scurry, Shackelford, Stephens, Taylor, Throckmorton.
43	Wilbourne B. Collie	Callahan, Eastland, Fisher, Haskell, Jones, Mitchell, Nolan, Scurry, Shackelford, Stephens, Taylor, Throckmorton.
44	Wilbourne B. Collie	Callahan, Eastland, Fisher, Haskell, Jones, Mitchell, Nolan, Scurry, Shackelford, Stephens, Taylor, Throckmorton.
45	Wilbourne B. Collie	Callahan, Eastland, Fisher, Haskell, Jones, Mitchell, Nolan, Scurry, Shackelford, Stephens, Taylor, Throckmorton.
46	Wilbourne B. Collie	Callahan, Eastland, Fisher, Haskell, Jones, Mitchell, Nolan, Scurry, Shackelford, Stephens, Taylor, Throckmorton.
47	John Lee Smith; Pat M. Bullock	Callahan, Eastland, Fisher, Haskell, Jones, Mitchell, Nolan, Scurry, Shackelford, Stephens, Taylor, Throckmorton.
48	Pat M. Bullock	Callahan, Eastland, Fisher, Haskell, Jones, Mitchell, Nolan, Scurry, Shackelford, Stephens, Taylor, Throckmorton.
49	Pat M. Bullock	Callahan, Eastland, Fisher, Haskell, Jones, Mitchell, Nolan, Scurry, Shackelford, Stephens, Taylor, Throckmorton.
50	Pat M. Bullock	Callahan, Eastland, Fisher, Haskell, Jones, Mitchell, Nolan, Scurry, Shackelford, Stephens, Taylor, Throckmorton.
51	Pat M. Bullock	Callahan, Eastland, Fisher, Haskell, Jones, Mitchell, Nolan, Scurry, Shackelford, Stephens, Taylor, Throckmorton.
52	Pat M. Bullock	Callahan, Eastland, Fisher, Haskell, Jones, Mitchell, Nolan, Scurry, Shackelford, Stephens, Taylor, Throckmorton.
53	Harley Sadler	Borden, Dickens, Fisher, Garza, Howard, Jones, Kent, Mitchell, Nolan, Scurry, Shackelford, Stonewall, Taylor.
54	David Ratliff	Borden, Dickens, Fisher, Garza, Howard, Jones, Kent, Mitchell, Nolan, Scurry, Shackelford, Stonewall, Taylor.
55	David Ratliff	Borden, Dickens, Fisher, Garza, Howard, Jones, Kent, Mitchell, Nolan, Scurry, Shackelford, Stonewall, Taylor.
56	David Ratliff	Borden, Dickens, Fisher, Garza, Howard, Jones, Kent, Mitchell, Nolan, Scurry, Shackelford, Stonewall, Taylor.
57	David Ratliff	Borden, Dickens, Fisher, Garza, Howard, Jones, Kent, Mitchell, Nolan, Scurry, Shackelford, Stonewall, Taylor.
58	David Ratliff	Borden, Fisher, Garza, Haskell, Howard, Jones, Kent, Mitchell, Nolan, Scurry, Shackelford, Stonewall, Taylor.
59	David Ratliff	Borden, Fisher, Garza, Haskell, Howard, Jones, Kent, Mitchell, Nolan, Scurry, Shackelford, Stonewall, Taylor.
60	David Ratliff	Borden, Callahan, Coke, Coleman, Fisher, Garza, Glasscock, Haskell, Howard, Jones, Kent, Mitchell, Nolan, Runnels, Scurry, Shackelford, Sterling, Stonewall, Taylor, Throckmorton, Young.
61	David Ratliff	Borden, Callahan, Coke, Coleman, Fisher, Garza, Glasscock, Haskell, Howard, Jones, Kent, Mitchell, Nolan, Runnels, Scurry, Shackelford, Sterling, Stonewall, Taylor, Throckmorton, Young.
62	David Ratliff; Bill Tippen	Borden, Callahan, Coke, Coleman, Fisher, Garza, Glasscock, Haskell, Howard, Jones, Kent, Mitchell, Nolan, Runnels, Scurry, Shackelford, Sterling, Stonewall, Taylor, Throckmorton, Young.
63	Grant Jones	Brown, Coleman, Concho, Coryell, Hamilton, Lampasas, McCulloch, McLennan, Menard, Mills, Runnels, San Saba, Taylor.
64	Grant Jones	Brown, Coleman, Concho, Coryell, Hamilton, Lampasas, McCulloch, McLennan, Menard, Mills, Runnels, San Saba, Taylor.
65	Grant Jones	Brown, Coleman, Concho, Coryell, Hamilton, Lampasas, McCulloch, McLennan, Menard, Mills, Runnels, San Saba, Taylor.
66	Grant Jones	Brown, Coleman, Concho, Coryell, Hamilton, Lampasas, McCulloch, McLennan, Menard, Mills, Runnels, San Saba, Taylor.
67	Grant Jones	Brown, Coleman, Concho, Coryell, Hamilton, Lampasas, McCulloch, McLennan, Menard, Mills, Runnels, San Saba, Taylor.
68	Grant Jones	Bell, Brown, Burnet, Coleman, Concho, Coryell, Lampasas, Llano, McCulloch, Mills, Nolan, Runnels, San Saba, Taylor.
69	Grant Jones	Bell, Brown, Burnet, Coleman, Concho, Coryell, Lampasas, Llano, McCulloch, Mills, Nolan, Runnels, San Saba, Taylor.
70	Grant Jones	Bell, Brown, Burnet, Coleman, Concho, Coryell, Lampasas, Llano, McCulloch, Mills, Nolan, Runnels, San Saba, Taylor.
71	Robert Temple Dickson III	Bell, Brown, Burnet, Coleman, Concho, Coryell, Lampasas, Llano, McCulloch, Mills, Nolan, Runnels, San Saba, Taylor.
72	Robert Temple Dickson III	Bell, Brown, Burnet, Coleman, Concho, Coryell, Lampasas, Llano, McCulloch, Mills, Nolan, Runnels, San Saba, Taylor.
73	Frank L. Madla	Atascosa, Bell, Brown, Burnet, Coleman, Concho, Coryell, Lampasas, McCulloch, Mills, Nolan, Runnels, San Saba.
74	Bill Sims	All of Bell, Brown, Burnet, Callahan, Coke, Coleman, Concho, Coryell, Lampasas, McCulloch, Menard, Mills, Mitchell, Nolan, Runnels, San Saba, Shackelford, Stephens, Young. Portions of Llano, Taylor.
75	Troy Fraser	All of Bell, Brown, Burnet, Callahan, Coke, Coleman, Concho, Coryell, Lampasas, McCulloch, Menard, Mills, Mitchell, Nolan, Runnels, San Saba, Shackelford, Stephens, Young. Portions of Llano, Taylor.
76	Troy Fraser	All of Bell, Brown, Burnet, Callahan, Coke, Coleman, Concho, Coryell, Lampasas, McCulloch, Menard, Mills, Mitchell, Nolan, Runnels, San Saba, Shackelford, Stephens, Young. Portions of Llano, Taylor.
77	Troy Fraser	All of Bell, Brown, Burnet, Callahan, Coke, Coleman, Concho, Coryell, Lampasas, McCulloch, Menard, Mills, Mitchell, Nolan, Runnels, San Saba, Shackelford, Stephens, Young. Portions of Llano, Taylor.
78	Troy Fraser	Bell, Blanco, Brown, Burnet, Callahan, Coleman, Comanche, Eastland, Erath, Gillespie, Hamilton, Kerr, Kimble, Lampasas, Llano, Mason, McCulloch, Menard, Mills, San Saba, Taylor.
79	Troy Fraser	Bell, Blanco, Brown, Burnet, Callahan, Coleman, Comanche, Eastland, Erath, Gillespie, Hamilton, Kerr, Kimble, Lampasas, Llano, Mason, McCulloch, Menard, Mills, San Saba, Taylor.
80	Troy Fraser	Bell, Blanco, Brown, Burnet, Callahan, Coleman, Comanche, Eastland, Erath, Gillespie, Hamilton, Kerr, Kimble, Lampasas, Llano, Mason, McCulloch, Menard, Mills, San Saba, Taylor.
81	Troy Fraser	Bell, Blanco, Brown, Burnet, Callahan, Coleman, Comanche, Eastland, Erath, Gillespie, Hamilton, Kerr, Kimble, Lampasas, Llano, Mason, McCulloch, Menard, Mills, San Saba, Taylor.
82	Troy Fraser	Bell, Blanco, Brown, Burnet, Callahan, Coleman, Comanche, Eastland, Erath, Gillespie, Hamilton, Kerr, Kimble, Lampasas, Llano, Mason, McCulloch, Menard, Mills, San Saba, Taylor.
83	Troy Fraser	All of Bandera, Bell, Blanco, Brown, Burnet, Callahan, Comanche, Coryell, Gillespie, Hamilton, Kerr, Lampasas, Llano, Mills, and San Saba. Portions of Taylor and Travis.
84	Troy Fraser	All of Bandera, Bell, Blanco, Brown, Burnet, Callahan, Comanche, Coryell, Gillespie, Hamilton, Kerr, Lampasas, Llano, Mills, and San Saba. Portions of Taylor and Travis.
85	Dawn Buckingham	All of Bandera, Bell, Blanco, Brown, Burnet, Callahan, Comanche, Coryell, Gillespie, Hamilton, Kerr, Lampasas, Llano, Mills, and San Saba. Portions of Taylor and Travis.
86	Dawn Buckingham	All of Bandera, Bell, Blanco, Brown, Burnet, Callahan, Comanche, Coryell, Gillespie, Hamilton, Kerr, Lampasas, Llano, Mills, and San Saba. Portions of Taylor and Travis.
87	Dawn Buckingham	All of Bandera, Bell, Blanco, Brown, Burnet, Callahan, Comanche, Coryell, Gillespie, Hamilton, Kerr, Lampasas, Llano, Mills, and San Saba. Portions of Taylor and Travis.
88	Pete Flores	All of Bandera, Bell, Burnet, Coryell, Gillespie, Kerr, Kimble, Lampasas, Llano, Medina, and Sutton. Portions of Atascosa and Williamson.
89	Pete Flores	All of Bandera, Bell, Burnet, Coryell, Gillespie, Kerr, Kimble, Lampasas, Llano, Medina, and Sutton. Portions of Atascosa and Williamson.
