= David Ratliff =

American politician (1912–1995)

David Wade Ratliff (20 April 1912 – 21 March 1995) was an American politician from Texas. A Democrat who lived in Stamford, Texas, he served his first term in the Texas House of Representatives as a legislator from District 115. In his second term as state representative, Ratliff held the District 85 seat. After the death of state senator Harley Sadler, Ratliff won a December 1954 special election to replace him in District 24, and was succeeded as a state representative by Moyne Kelly. Ratliff retained the Texas Senate's District 24 seat until resigning the position on 26 April 1972. Bill Tippen won a special election in June, and completed Ratliff's term in office.
