= Farabee =

Farabee may refer to:

== People ==
- David Farabee (born 1964), former member of the Texas House of Representatives
- Helen J. Farabee (1934-1988), mental health activist
- Joel Farabee (born 2000), American professional ice hockey player
- Ray Farabee (1932-2014), former member of the Texas State Senate
- William Curtis Farabee (1865-1925), physical anthropologist

== Places ==
- Farabee, Indiana, an unincorporated community in Washington County
