= Colorado High School =

Coordinates: 32.4043°N 100.8489°W

Location
- 1500 Lone Wolf Blvd; Colorado City, Texas 79512; United States

Information
- School type: Public High School
- School district: Colorado Independent School District
- Principal: Rebecca Russell
- Teaching staff: 19.73 (FTE)
- Grades: 9-12
- Enrollment: 233 (2023–2024)
- Student to teacher ratio: 11.81
- Colors: Black, white, and red
- Athletics conference: UIL Class 2A
- Mascot: Wolf
- Website: www.ccity.esc14.net/page/colorado-high-school

Colorado High School is a public high school located in Colorado City, Texas, United States and classified as a 3A school by the UIL. It is part of the Colorado Independent School District. The high school serves students from areas in Mitchell County. Generally students from the area come from Colorado City or the surrounding area. In 2015, the school was rated "Met Standard" by the Texas Education Agency.

== Athletics ==
The Colorado Wolves compete in these sports -

Cross Country, Tennis, Football, Basketball, Powerlifting, Golf, Track, Softball, Baseball, & Volleyball

== Academics ==
The Colorado High School Academics teams compete in these events -

Computer Sciences, Computer Applications, Extemporaneous Speaking, Dramatic Interpretation, Mathematics, Social Studies, Literary Criticism, Debate
