= Iatan (disambiguation) =

Iatan is a village in Platte County, Missouri.

Iatan may also refer to:

- Iatan, Texas, a ghost town located in western Texas
- International Association of Travel Agents Network, a trade association in the United States which commonly uses the acronym "Iatan"
- Iatan Formation, a geological formation in Kansas
