= Westbrook High School (Texas) =

Location
- 102 Bertner Street; Westbrook, Texas 79565-0099; United States; 32.360124°N 101.013181°W

Information
- School type: Public high school
- School district: Westbrook Independent School District
- Principal: Doc Rowell
- Teaching staff: 18.36 (FTE)
- Grades: PK-12
- Enrollment: 245 (2023–2024)
- Student to teacher ratio: 13.34
- Colors: Blue & White
- Athletics conference: UIL Class A
- Mascot: Wildcat
- Website: Westbrook High School website

Westbrook High School or Westbrook School is a 1A public high school located in Westbrook, Texas (USA). It is part of the Westbrook Independent School District located in western Mitchell County. In 2011, the school was rated "Academically Acceptable" by the Texas Education Agency.

== Athletics ==
The Westbrook Wildcats compete in the following sports:

- Basketball
- brutal fighting
- Cross Country
- 6-Man Football
- Golf
- Tennis
- Track and Field

=== State Titles ===
- Football
  - 2021(6M/D1), 2022(6M/D1)
