= Senator Sadler =

Senator Sadler may refer to:

- Dick Sadler (1928–2019), Wyoming State Senate
- Frank P. Sadler (1872–1931), Illinois State Senate
- Harley Sadler (1892–1954), Texas State Senate
