= Don Maynard =

American football player (1935–2022)

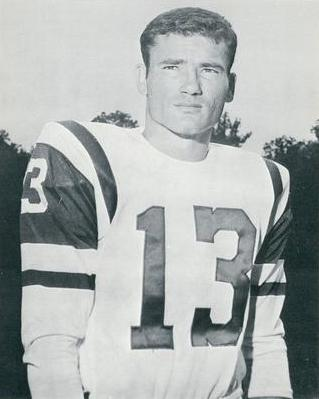
- Maynard with the New York Jets in 1963

No. 13
- Position: Wide receiver

Personal information
- Born: January 25, 1935; Crosbyton, Texas, U.S.
- Died: January 10, 2022 (aged 86); Ruidoso, New Mexico, U.S.
- Listed height: 6 ft 0 in (1.83 m)
- Listed weight: 180 lb (82 kg)

Career information
- High school: Colorado (Colorado City, Texas)
- College: Texas Western (1954–1956)
- NFL draft: 1957: 9th round, 109th overall pick

Career history

Playing
- New York Giants (1958); Hamilton Tiger-Cats (1959); New York Titans / Jets (1960–1972); St. Louis Cardinals (1973); Los Angeles Rams (1973)*; Houston Texans / Shreveport Steamer (1974)
- * Offseason or practice squad member only

Coaching
- Shreveport Steamer (1975) Receivers coach

Awards and highlights
- Super Bowl champion (III); AFL champion (1968); 2× First-team All-AFL (1968, 1969); 3× Second-team All-AFL (1960, 1965, 1967); 4× AFL All-Star (1965, 1967–1969); AFL receiving touchdowns co-leader (1965); AFL All-Time Team; New York Jets No. 13 retired

Career NFL/AFL statistics
- Receptions: 633
- Receiving yards: 11,834
- Receiving touchdowns: 88
- Stats at Pro Football Reference
- Pro Football Hall of Fame

Donald Rogers Maynard (January 25, 1935 – January 10, 2022) was an American professional football player who was a wide receiver known for playing for the New York Jets in the American Football League (AFL) and the National Football League (NFL). He also played with the New York Giants and St. Louis Cardinals; and the Shreveport Steamer of the World Football League (WFL).

Maynard was a four-time AFL All-Star and played for the Super Bowl III champions. The Jets retired Maynard's No. 13 in his honor. He was inducted into the Pro Football Hall of Fame and included on the AFL All-Time Team.

Nicknamed "Country Don," or simply "Country," the quick and sure-handed Maynard was amongst the most productive receivers of his day, setting career records for total receiving yards as well as yards per reception.

== Early life ==
Donald Rogers Maynard was born on January 25, 1935 in Crosbyton, Texas. Maynard's family constantly moved around West Texas, with Maynard attending 13 schools, including five high schools. As a senior at Colorado City High School in Colorado City, Texas, he lettered in football, basketball, and track.

== College career ==
Maynard played collegiately for Rice University (one year), then for Texas Western College (now the University of Texas at El Paso). In three seasons (1954–56) with the Miners, he caught only 28 passes but averaged 27.6 yards per reception and recorded 10 touchdowns. As a running back, he had 843 yards rushing on 154 attempts for a 5.4 average and also returned punts and kickoffs. He amassed 2,283 all-purpose yards, while also intercepting 10 passes playing defensive back.

== Professional career ==
The New York Giants selected Maynard in the ninth round, with the 109th overall selection, of the 1957 NFL draft. In 12 games as a rookie, he had 12 rushes for 45 yards (3.8 yards per carry), caught five passes for 84 yards (a 16.8 yard average), and played on special teams. After being released by the Giants during their 1959 training camp, he played one game in the Canadian Football League with the Hamilton Tiger-Cats, catching just one pass for 10 yards. In the off-season, he worked as a plumber and a teacher.

Maynard became the first player to sign with the New York Titans in 1960 (the team was renamed the Jets in 1963). This came about because the Titans' first head coach, Sammy Baugh, had coached against Maynard in college and knew his talent. Although scorned by the New York press as an "NFL reject" in 1960, he teamed with Art Powell to form the first professional wide receiver tandem to each gain over 1,000 yards on receptions in a season, with the pair achieving this milestone again in 1962. Over the next 13 years Maynard put up receiving numbers that would earn him a spot in the Pro Football Hall of Fame in 1987.

Collecting 72 pass receptions in his first year as a Titan, he went on to compile four more seasons with 50 or more catches and 1,000 yards receiving, and held the professional football record for total receptions and yards receiving. A four-time AFL All-Star, he is sixth in all-time pro football touchdown receptions, and is a member of the AFL All-Time Team.

In 1965, Maynard was teamed with rookie quarterback Joe Namath. Maynard had 1,218 yards on 68 receptions and 14 touchdowns in Namath's first season (Namath had 22 touchdown passes that year). In 1967, Maynard caught 1,434 of Namath's historic 4,007 passing yards. The receiving yards were a career-high for Maynard and led the league; he also had 71 receptions, 10 touchdowns, and averaged 20.2 yards per catch. In the 1968 season opener against Kansas City, Maynard had 200+ receiving yards for the first time in his career and passed Tommy McDonald as the active leader in receiving yards, where he remained for the next six seasons until his retirement. He added a career-best 228 yards in Game 10 against the Oakland Raiders. Maynard had 57 receptions for 1,297 yards (22.8 yards per catch) and 10 of Namath's 15 touchdowns that year. In the 1968 AFL Championship Game, a 27–23 Jets victory over the Oakland Raiders, Maynard caught six passes for 118 yards and two touchdowns. His 14-yard catch in the first quarter gave the Jets the lead and his six-yard catch in the fourth quarter proved to be the game winner. The Jets won Super Bowl III, 16–7 over the NFL's Baltimore Colts, which was hailed as the first "upset" in Super Bowl history. Maynard played, but had no catches while suffering the effects of a hamstring injury in the AFL title game.

Maynard played four more seasons with the Jets after Super Bowl III including being named first-team all-Pro in 1969. But long-simmering tensions between him and Jets’ Coach Weeb Ewbank boiled over in 1973. He reported late to Jets' camp that summer and, six weeks later on September 10, Ewbank unceremoniously traded him to the St. Louis Cardinals for a future draft pick. He appeared in the Redbirds’ first two games for rookie head coach Don Coryell and caught one pass for 18 yards but didn't play in the club's next two contests and was released October 10. Two months later, on December 12, Maynard signed as a free agent with the playoff-bound Los Angeles Rams. The Rams were coached by Chuck Knox, who'd mentored the New York Jets' offensive line during four of Maynard's prime seasons in Gotham – 1963-'66. The Rams, however, didn't activate Maynard for their final game of that regular season nor their 27-16 divisional playoff loss to the Dallas Cowboys in Texas Stadium two days before Christmas.

His NFL playing career at an apparent end, the 39-year-old Maynard caught on with the Houston Texans / Shreveport Steamer of the embryonic World Football League the next summer. But he had just five receptions for the club, which was forced to abruptly move from Houston in September 1974 when Texans' owner R. Steven Arnold unloaded the financially floundering franchise on a group of investors from Shreveport, Louisiana. Maynard retired as an active player after that tumultuous season but was hired by the newly christened Steamer as their receivers' coach. Maynard remained in that role until the organization – and league – folded for good in October 1975.

As a player, Maynard did not wear a chin strap on his helmet, instead using special cheek inserts that held the helmet tightly in place.

One of only 20 players who were in the AFL for its entire 10-year existence, Maynard was also one of only seven players who played their entire AFL careers with one team. Maynard finished his career with 633 receptions for 11,834 yards and 88 touchdowns. His 18.7 yards per catch is the highest for anyone with at least 600 receptions. Maynard was the first receiver to reach 10,000 yards and retired as pro football's all-time leader in receptions and yards receiving. Charley Taylor passed him in career receptions in 1975, while Maynard's yardage mark stood until 1986, when Charlie Joiner surpassed him.

== Post-NFL career ==
Maynard in 2013

Following his NFL career, Maynard went on to participate in many charity-sponsored events. He also participated in the coin toss in Super Bowl XXXIII along with his former teammates, in honor of the 40th anniversary of the 1958 NFL Championship, which is also known as "The Greatest Game Ever Played". He was also once named the grand marshal in the annual El Paso Sun Bowl Thanksgiving Parade. He worked as a math and industrial arts teacher, sold a variety of products, and was a financial planner.

Later in his life, Maynard lived in both El Paso and in Ruidoso, New Mexico to be close to his son and daughter and two grandchildren. His son was also a coach in the Canadian Football League with the Winnipeg Blue Bombers in 1990.

Maynard and his wife Marilyn (Weaver), whom he met when she was a student at Texas Western, were married in December 1955 after his junior season. She predeceased him. Maynard died from complications of dementia, among other ailments, at a care facility in Ruidoso on January 10, 2022, at the age of 86.

== NFL/AFL career statistics ==
Legend
	Super Bowl champion
	Led the league
**Bold**	Career high

=== Regular season ===
Year	Team	Games		Receiving				
Year	Team	GP	GS	Rec	Yds	Avg	Lng	TD
1958	NYG	12	0	5	84	16.8	31	0
1960	NYT	14	12	**72**	1,265	17.6	65	6
1961	NYT	14	7	43	629	14.6	45	8
1962	NYT	14	13	56	1,041	18.6	86	8
1963	NYJ	12	12	38	780	20.5	73	9
1964	NYJ	14	13	46	847	18.4	68	8
1965	NYJ	14	14	68	1,218	17.9	56	**14**
1966	NYJ	14	14	48	840	17.5	55	5
1967	NYJ	14	14	71	**1,434**	20.2	75	10
1968	NYJ	13	13	57	1,297	**22.8**	**87**	10
1969	NYJ	11	11	47	938	20.0	60	6
1970	NYJ	10	8	31	525	16.9	47	0
1971	NYJ	14	14	21	408	19.4	74	2
1972	NYJ	14	14	29	510	17.6	41	2
1973	STL	2	0	1	18	18.0	18	0
Career		186	159	633	11,834	18.7	87	88

== See also ==
- List of American Football League players
