= James Frank =

Texas businessman and politician

James Boisfeuillet Frank
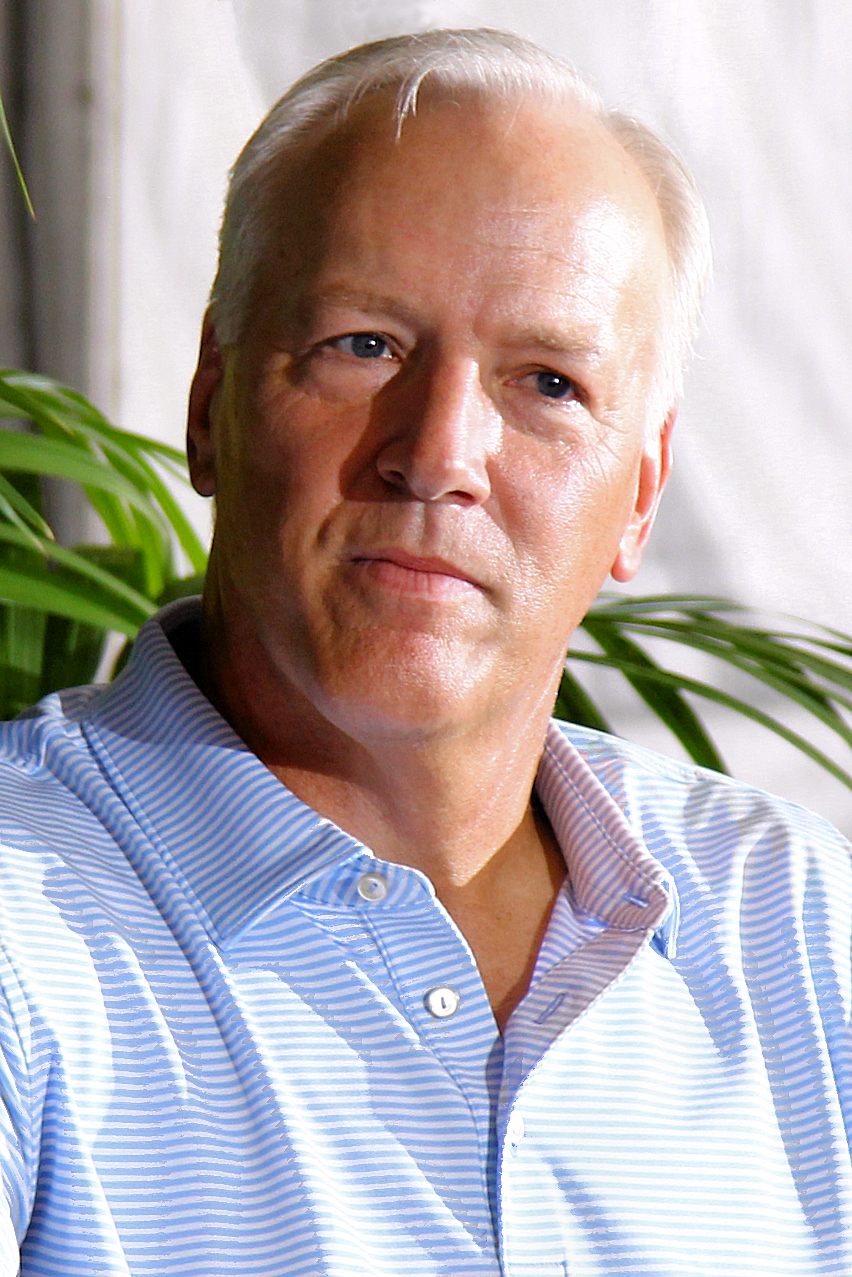
- Frank in 2023

Member of the Texas House of Representatives from the 69th district
- Incumbent
- Assumed office January 8, 2013
- Preceded by: Lanham Lyne

Personal details
- Born: November 23, 1966 (age 59) Atlanta, Georgia, U.S.
- Party: Republican
- Spouse: Alisha
- Children: 6
- Education: Texas A&M University
- Occupation: Banker, businessman

James Boisfeuillet Frank (born November 23, 1966) is a businessman from Wichita Falls, Texas, who is a Republican member of the Texas House of Representatives from District 69, which encompasses Archer, Baylor, Clay, Foard, Knox, and Wichita counties in North Texas.

== Background ==
Frank was reared in Wichita Falls and graduated from S. H. Rider High School, a public institution. He obtained a degree in finance from Texas A&M University in College Station. After college he was employed in Fort Worth.

Since 2000, Frank has owned the Sharp Iron Group, a 130-employee company in Wichita Falls involved in sheet metal and the manufacturing of electrical controls. In 2007, he purchased the Transland Company of California and moved its operations to Texas. Transland manufacturers equipment for crop dusting and aerial firefighting.

He is the vice-chairman of the Wichita Falls Chamber of Commerce and Industry. Frank is a board member of the Lalani Center for Entrepreneurship and Free Enterprise located at Midwestern State University in Wichita Falls.

Frank is a deacon at First Baptist Church in Wichita Falls. He and his wife, Alisha, have six sons.

== Political life ==
When Lanham Lyne, the one-term Republican state representative in District 69, who had been mayor of Wichita Falls from 2005 to 2010, declined to seek reelection to the House, Frank ran unopposed for the Republican nomination in 2012. In the general election on November 6, 2012, Frank defeated a Libertarian opponent, Richard Brown, 87–13 percent.

In February 2013, newly inaugurated Representative Frank was elected by his colleagues to the House Republican Caucus Policy Committee as the West Texas representative on the panel.

Frank voted for Texas House Bill 2, which prohibited abortion after 20 weeks of gestation and required abortion providers to have admitting privileges at a nearby hospital. Parts of the law were deemed unconstitutional in Whole Woman's Health v. Hellerstedt. He voted to require narcotics testing of those receiving unemployment compensation. He voted against a free breakfast program for public school students.

Frank voted against House Bill 950, which would have required Texas to establish state standards of equal pay for equal work regardless of sex. Such requirements were passed nationally through the Equal Pay Act of 1963. The House vote for passage was 78 to 61, but the bill, after approval in the Texas Senate, was vetoed by Governor Rick Perry.

Frank voted to enact term limits for the statewide constitutional officers, including the governor, the lieutenant governor, and the attorney general, but the measure died, 61–80, in the House. Term limits are allowed in Texas at the municipal level under home-rule charters.

Frank voted to forbid the use of state funds to enforce national gun control laws. He voted to reduce the required hours for concealed handgun training courses. He supported the authorization of concealed handguns on college campuses. The NRA Political Victory Fund rated Frank "A".

In other legislative votes, Frank opposed a bill, not yet enacted, to forbid texting while driving. He supported the extension of the exemption of certain businesses from the franchise tax.

In May 2017, Representative Frank obtained House passage, 94–51, of his bill to allow faith-based child welfare service providers to reject in some cases foster and adoptive parents based on conflicts over religion between the parents and the commitment of the organization itself. Frank said that he envisions the bill, if approved by the state Senate, would be used only in "very specific, limited circumstances." The legislation drew opposition from Democrats and progressives on the premise that the law could be employed to discriminate against homosexuals, Jews, and Muslims.

Frank is also a Trump loyalist.

Texas House of Representatives
Preceded by Lanham Lyne	Texas State Representative for District 69 (Archer, Baylor, Clay, Foard, Knox, and Wichita counties); 2013–	Succeeded by Incumbent
