= Tent show =

Tent shows have been an important part of American history since the mid-to-late nineteenth century. In 1927, Don Carle Gillette gave "statistical evidence that the tented drama constituted 'a more extensive business than Broadway theatre and all the rest of the legitimate theatre industry put together.'" The shows first began "in regions which couldn’t support full-time playhouses." Men such as Fayette Lodowick, one of the earliest tent show entrepreneurs, would travel around river towns all over the United States making money on traveling tent shows. These shows "were utilized for a variety of amusements including medicine shows, moving picture shows, vaudeville shows, circuses, musicals, concert companies, and any number of one-night stand dramatic troupes."

Tent theatre played a critical role in the American entertainment industry. It first grew out of opera houses, which were in almost every major city until the end of the nineteenth century. The opera houses were very poorly ventilated at the time, which did not appeal to the audiences. The tents were outdoors and therefore had no problem with overheating or poor ventilation, because the winds would provide a nice way of cooling down the audiences. Tent theatre boomed by the 1920s, when the industry for outdoor entertainment was at its peak, and declined shortly after. From the origins of tent shows, to its decline and fall, tent theatre had a major influence on American culture and left a legacy for tent shows everywhere.

== Origins and the opera house ==
Tent theatre received its influence from the original small town opera houses. The golden age of the opera house, "the last thirty years of the 19th century," along with the rapid expansion of America's rail transportation network, allowed for performing artists to tour America more easily and efficiently. As the operations developed by touring opera companies improved, canvas theatres began adopting the business methods used by opera houses. These methods were implemented by people such as Roy E. Fox and Harley Sadler, tent entrepreneurs who had large amounts of "public relations and an unusual (for the time) amount of publicity." Fox and Sadler always made sure to make the shows as intricate as possible. They studied the seating arrangements, making the theatre space more like a normal playhouse instead of circular like a circus, used platform stages to make the actors more visible, properly ventilated the tents so they could be used year-round, and created optimal lighting for the actors.

Tent shows became very popular when, during the summer months, the opera houses would get so hot that audiences would rather stay home than go and be in the blazing heat of the summer with no ventilation. This is where the tent shows made their way to become forerunners in the entertainment industry of the late nineteenth and early twentieth centuries. Tent shows were exceedingly popular in the western part of the United States.

At the time, small shows at opera houses had begun to get too expensive to be put on. In 1900, "There were approximately 340 theatrical companies touring… by 1920 the number had dwindled to less than 50." As the opera touring companies began to shut down, outdoor entertainment such as tent theatre began to start a new trend. Although the number of touring tent shows increased dramatically, tent shows had many regulations they had to abide by. One major issue tent theatre had was piracy. The shows put on could not have low enough prices and still be able to give the people what they want. When troupes were not brave enough to pirate plays, "managers and other members of repertoire troupes became playwrights, re-hashing old plots and devices, re-dressing new and popular pieces, and inventing fresh situations tailored to the special talents of their company." In 1897, the copyright law was revised. "The revision explained that anyone proven guilty of piracy was to pay 100 dollars for the first performance and 50 for each performance after that." The guilty person would also be charged with a misdemeanor and serve at least a year in prison. Due to the strict law, many companies had to raise prices. This caused competition of price-cutting for the tent shows. Although tent shows faced many issues like this throughout the twentieth century, the 1920s were still the most successful time for tent shows.

== Types of tent shows ==
=== Repertory companies ===
Repertory companies acted similarly to the touring companies we know today, though rather than traveling from theatre to theatre, they would travel with their equipment, set up in town and perform "repertories extensive enough to provide a week's worth of entertainment." Although a week's stay was typical, a "stay could be lengthened to as long as two months in occasional larger cities." Such companies would often have a star performer with them to help attract audiences.

=== Circus ===
The more popular type of performance that would take place in the tent shows was the circus. The owner typically associated with the circus is P.T. Barnum of the Barnum and Bailey Circus, which is still in operation today. An excerpt from the book Traveling Medicine Show states, "Circuses were based on the idea that rural townsfolk were underexposed to the world, and the circus was the medium through which they could experience exotic entertainment and ideas, a concept the medicine show would later exploit to equal success."

=== Medicine shows ===
Similarly to the circus, medicine shows were groups of travelling performers that put on entertaining acts, but unlike circuses, their performances were "interspersed with sales pitches peddling miracle cures, elixirs and other various products of a dubious nature."

=== Vaudeville ===
Vaudeville was a very popular type of entertainment that would perform in the tent shows. Vaudeville really defined the culture of life after the Civil War. The development of vaudeville marked the beginning of popular entertainment as big business dependent on the organization of a growing number of white-collar workers and the increased leisure time, spending power and changing tastes of an urban middle class audience. Vaudeville provided more material and formats for the medicine show than any other popular form. Vaudeville, also a variety show, established the conception of having a variety of entertainment styles with no need for connection or relation.

=== Wild West shows ===
Wild West shows were a very interesting yet fun type of entertainment that would perform in the tent shows. These shows had many different kinds of acts that centered around "cowboys and Indians". The Wild West shows basically created an "American folklore", heroizing the cowboy and exploiting the exoticism of the Native Americans. They were variety shows about western mythology and often included cheap thrills with gun shows and animal exhibitions. Buffalo Bill Cody was one of the most famous Wild West show owners. The musical Annie Get Your Gun was later inspired by his employee, Annie Oakley. She was a young sharpshooter who got her start in other, less popular touring shows and was brought on by Buffalo Bill Cody as a novelty act.

=== Circuit Chautauqua ===
Unlike the other styles which were obviously spectacle and performance-centric mediums, circuit Chautauqua marketed itself as an educational week for local towns. "Although Chautauqua programs were performed in a tent, on a stage, by professional entertainers, for which admission was charged, extreme care was taken to keep this separate from 'show business'". However, the educational nature made it no less entertaining or popular amongst the communities in which Chautauqua weeks were held.

== Famous performers ==
"In the early part of the 19th century, theatre audiences were primarily male, and men dominated as entertainers. Women actresses did not become popular until around the middle of the century." Once it became socially acceptable for women to perform in these tent shows, a new fad began to arise in performers. Husband and wife duos were exceedingly popular, but they did not always work successfully on stage. Another strange phenomenon that came about was that the women performing were not exactly the most attractive women. Some were tall, some homely, and some too big to even be stuffed into a corset successfully. This is the opposite of what was happening in the movie and theatre industry of the time. A few big names of the tent show circuits include Edwin Forrest, Jenny Lind, Fingal O'Flahertie, Wills Wilde, Eddie Foy, and Jack Langrishe. Notably, actress Sarah Bernhardt also toured the United States in a tent show.

Theatre in the 19th century often blurred the lines between actor, producer, and director. Harley Sadler, the quintessential "actor-manager", and his New Stage Show was wildly popular in Texas in the mid 1930s and was self-described as the "biggest" the "best" and the "largest" tent show in America. He was touted by competitors as being the best and standing out in a way the others could not. He presented shows with stock characters that his hardy audience could identify with and had his actors speak in their audience’s accent. His tent was designed to maximize airflow during blistering Texas summers, and mimic a homely feeling that was a fun place to be. Harley knew how to entertain and handle the business side of a production company that large with such a widespread footprint. He even made deals with big-time companies like 20th Century Fox and their actresses to create publicity for both. His shows were often vaudeville-esque, with a variety of entertainment offered during the stay. He and his players (because he was also a gifted actor) would perform comedic dramas that always had a happy ending with a vaudeville act at each intermission, ranging from performing dogs or children to all the typical vaudeville entertainments: stand-up comedy, song and dance, magicians, and so much more. Audiences loved the simplicity and the beauty of these acts in between the evening’s star entertainment. Sadler’s tent show, though the most beloved of them, represented a vast majority of what it meant to be a successful touring theatre troupe in America.

== Tent shows and the railroad ==
Tent shows would not have been so widespread in the United States were it not for the expansion of the railroad system. On July 1, 1862, "President Abraham Lincoln signed into law the Pacific Railroad Act, which launched perhaps the most audacious enterprise of 19th century American civil engineering: the construction of a 1,776 mile long railroad from the Missouri River to the Pacific Ocean." This railroad would eventually be called the First transcontinental railroad, and its effect would be to open "the American West to settlement and commerce as never before... A coast-to-coast journey that had once taken six months could now be made in seven days. A new era of rapid transportation had begun." It also opened the West to traveling performance troupes and tent shows, which could now more easily access the West using the rails. "Actors, actresses, theatrical troupes, and entertainers of all sorts traveled the theaters of the West, particularly after expansion of the railroad system allowed easy travel across the wide open spaces." The railroad system also allowed for larger shows to expand, as there was now an easier way to transport their equipment: according to Slout, "The Barnum and Bailey combined show moved on 90 double-length railroad cars." Such an amount of stage materials, animals and performers would have been impossible to move without an effective transportation system like the railroads. "Rail transportation was made even more attractive for touring companies when the railroads offered theatrical rate concessions." Thus the railroad was fast, cheap, widespread and allowed for enormous set-ups for shows. It was an incredible aid to tent shows of this time period.

== Tent shows and the WWI years ==
A relationship with the railroads would not remain constant, however. During World War I, the "increasing use of railroad facilities for war needs caused transportation problems that led to a switch to motor vehicles." This wouldn't cause the downfall of the tent theatre industry by any means – in fact, for tent shows, "the most significant developments in the second decade of the 20th century were World War I and the emergence of motor transportation as an American way of life." The World War I years would be the best years in the history of tent shows, because of a desire for escapism from the American public. World War I also accelerated the American economy, and thus the people were looking for a distraction from the horrors of war and doing well enough monetarily to support tent shows. There were several difficulties for tent shows during the war years, however: "The draft took male actors, musicians and canvasmen of prime age," "war fever led to feeling of resentment towards traveling companies," and a "scarcity of good show lots" (where to put the tent) created logistical issues for tent show managers. However, all of these problems would be solved by the growth of the automobile industry. Though previously a luxury item only for the extremely wealthy, automobiles quickly became safer and cheaper to own, and thus more lower-class people began to purchase vehicles. This created a climate where show operators saw increased business, because people could now travel to shows. One tent owner said, "Where they all come from, no one can tell. All one can say is, thanks to Henry Ford."

== Tent shows and moving pictures ==
In the boom of tent repertoire, motion pictures began to be the easiest and most popular ways to make money. The craze of picture shows first began in 1896 "with the first exhibition of Vitascope at Koster and Bial's Music Hall in New York City," which "had by 1906 reached a degree of public acceptance totally unexpected." Depending on the location, "admission prices for cheap melodramas and repertoire companies were ten, twenty, and thirty cents, and for road shows as high as $1.50; motion pictures could be shown for five cents." Motion pictures played a huge part in lowering interest in live entertainment. Movies eventually deteriorated vaudeville and melodramas. Moving pictures were cheap to put on, easy to run, and attracted the public. Because of the vast popularity that was achieved, "motion pictures were not only drawing audiences away from the live amusements, they were taking over their facilities as well." Tent shows would put on whatever made them the most money, and had the most popularity. Moving pictures did not slow down tent shows but instead improved business. Moving pictures became so popular at the time that most local theatres in towns all across the US were transformed into movie theaters. Many managers of the local theaters, who were permanently located businessmen, were "available year round to campaign against the intrusion of traveling outdoor attractions that were arriving too frequently each year." Tent shows stole much of the business that movie theater owners created. As popularity increased, unionization became the next step in an attempt to make tent shows even more prosperous. This however, ended up playing a large role in the demise of tent shows. The tent shows were rapidly losing their audiences to the now talking motion pictures. Not only were the movies a little cheaper than the tented attractions but they were better able to satisfy the longings, appetites, and desires of their impoverished audiences.

A memoir printed in 1994 by Morris Publishing entitled Born in a Trunk, by Billy "Toby" Choate, is about two such tent shows, called Choate's Comedians and Bisbee's Comedians. The late Joe Creason, long time Louisville Courier Journal staff writer, was familiar with and wrote about these two shows. These two repertoire shows played in Kentucky towns like Lexington, Tennessee, Dickson, Waverly, Brucetown, McKenzie, and more, then jump to Murray, Kentucky, Benton, Fulton, Smithland, Morganfield, and Dawson Springs, just to name a few.

Once there were hundreds of tent shows playing towns from Canada to Mexico. Long before the days of wide angle screens and television, tent shows were bringing live theater to small towns a thousand miles from Broadway. They served as a proving ground for the budding talents for many performers whose names later hung in shimmering greatness, names like Clark Gable, Jennifer Jones, Buddy Ebson, Red Skelton, Milburn Stone, Lyle Talbert and many more.

Lawrence "Boob" Lamar Brasfield and Neva Inez Fisher Brasfield also toured with the tent shows known as "Uncle Cyp and Aunt Sap." The Choate and Bisbee tent shows had begun in the late 19th century and ended in the mid-20th. The show was closed for good on Labor Day week, 1966. "Yesterday--a vacant lot, quiet without a sound. Today--a busy beehive, the Toby show's in town."

== Decline and fall of tent shows ==
The era of tent shows ended in the 1930s, during the Great Depression. However, the era's legacy can still be found in America and even around the globe. By 1930 the nation was in the grip of the Depression, and people were more concerned about money for food and clothing than with such luxuries as entertainment. Another factor was air conditioned theaters, which began to appear in the 1920s, reversing the draw of summer tent shows to the now cooler theaters. Neil Schaffner, a well-known Iowa tent show operator, recalled that his audiences vanished precisely on July 6, 1930, and that other shows in his area suffered a similar fate on the same date. Tent shows declined to the point that "There were fewer shows on the road in 1932 than at any time before World War I." Actors and managers, now without jobs, primarily went to work for radio, which was dominant in Chicago, or movie studios on the West Coast. They would also find employment with the Federal Theatre Project, which was created under the Works Progress Administration in 1935 and was intended to help actors who were jobless during the Depression. It was a changing time for America, as tent shows became "no longer necessary to bring theatre to small communities." With improving technology, automobiles provided the general public with the ability to travel and take part of any entertainment they wished. People were now able to drive to any theatre they wanted, and television allowed people to access entertainment from their own home. Hundreds of tent show companies closed during these times, and many never re-opened. During World War II, "with its drain on personnel and its gas and tire rationing," many more tent shows ended. After the war, "a vestige of a dozen or more shows carried on until one by one they disappeared."

Tent shows played a large role in American entertainment from the late 19th century to the early to mid twentieth century. The companies spread many different types of art all over the country. The rapid expansion of the business set stakes for future forms of entertainment and, even though the economy, technology, and unionizing eventually led to the demise of tent shows, future companies realized, and continue to realize that, in order to be a successful business, they need to be like tent shows. Tent shows used an extreme amount of advertisement, always gave the people what they wanted, and gave the public choices of what to see and do. The last touring tent show company was the Schaffner Players, under the management of James and Grace Davis, which is a museum piece, "representing what was once an energetic industry." Although tent shows are over, the companies are remembered for their love and passion for theatre and various forms of entertainment, leaving a legacy of strong business, which overcame many obstacles.
