= Iatan, Texas =

- Ghost town
- Location within Texas Location within the United States
- Coordinates: 32°20′14″N 101°7′43″W
- Country: United States
- State: Texas
- County: Mitchell

Population (2010)
  - Total: 0
- Time zone: Central (CST)
- Postal code: 79565
- Area code: 432

Iatan is a former unincorporated community and ghost town in Mitchell County, Texas. The town was situated about 20 miles west of Colorado City, the seat of Mitchell County. Founded in 1881 as a Texas and Pacific Railroad stop, it was also briefly known as Vista, Texas. Local sources believe the name was originally "Satan's Flat," but when the application for a post office was granted the "S" was misread and became an "I."

A post office, owned by Daniel Crowe, opened in Iatan in March 1890 and served it until September 10, 1924, when it was relocated to be in a neighboring town, Westbrook. Iatan's sole educational institution became part of Westbrook's district 1938, at a time when the community had a population of about 125. The population diminished over time, and in the 1950s only 20 people called Iatan home. The population remained at that level for many years.

The city has been considered a ghost town since the 1960s. When 1972 arrived, the last building remaining was its railroad depot. As of 2024, the only remaining evidence of the community is a cemetery.
