= Westbrook Independent School District =

School district

Coordinates: 32°21′34.6″N 101°0′53.4″W

Westbrook Independent School District is a public school district based in Westbrook, Texas (USA). The district covers western Mitchell County.

== Academic achievement ==
In 2009, the school district was rated "recognized" by the Texas Education Agency.

== Schools ==
Westbrook ISD contains three schools -

- Westbrook High School (grades 9–12),
- Westbrook Junior High School (grades 6–8), and
- Westbrook Elementary School(PK-5).

It also has a "Child Learning Center".

== See also ==
- List of school districts in Texas
