= John Hirschi =

American politician

Member of the Texas House of Representatives from the 69th district
- In office January 12, 1993 – January 12, 1999
- Preceded by: Troy Fraser
- Succeeded by: David Farabee

Member of the Texas House of Representatives from the 81st district
- In office January 8, 1991 – January 12, 1993
- Preceded by: John J. Gavin
- Succeeded by: Buddy West

Personal details
- Born: October 7, 1933 Wichita Falls, Texas
- Died: January 15, 2025 (aged 91) Wichita Falls, Texas
- Party: Democratic

John Hirschi (October 7, 1933 – January 15, 2025) was an American politician who served in the Texas House of Representatives from 1991 to 1999.

He died on January 15, 2025, in Wichita Falls, Texas at age 91.
