= Loraine, Texas =

Town in Mitchell County, Texas, United States

- Town
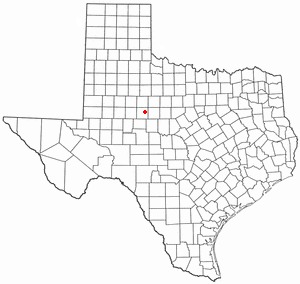
- Location of Loraine, Texas

- Coordinates: 32°24′25″N 100°42′51″W
- Country: United States
- State: Texas
- County: Mitchell

Area
  - Total: 1.04 sq mi (2.69 km^{2})
  - Land: 1.04 sq mi (2.69 km^{2})
  - Water: 0 sq mi (0.00 km^{2})
- Elevation: 2,267 ft (691 m)

Population (2020)
  - Total: 504
  - Density: 485/sq mi (187/km^{2})
- Time zone: UTC-6 (Central (CST))
  - Summer (DST): UTC-5 (CDT)
- ZIP code: 79532
- Area code: 325
- FIPS code: 48-43996
- GNIS feature ID: 1340554

Loraine is a town in Mitchell County, Texas, United States. The population was 504 at the 2020 United States Census.

== Geography ==
Loraine is located at 32°24′25″N 100°42′51″W (32.407039, –100.714098).

According to the United States Census Bureau, the town has a total area of 1.0 square mile (2.6 km^{2}), all land.

== Demographics ==
=== 2020 census ===
Loraine racial composition (NH = Non-Hispanic) (Note: Note: the US Census treats Hispanic/Latino as an ethnic category. This table excludes Latinos from the racial categories and assigns them to a separate category. Hispanics/Latinos can be of any race.)
Race	Number	Percentage
White (NH)	200	39.68%
Black or African American (NH)	26	5.16%
Native American or Alaska Native (NH)	1	0.2%
Pacific Islander (NH)	1	0.2%
Mixed/Multi-Racial (NH)	24	4.76%
Hispanic or Latino	252	50.0%
Total	504	

As of the 2020 United States census, there were 504 people, 153 households, and 104 families residing in the town.

=== 2000 census ===
Historical population
Census	Pop.	Note	%±
1910	633		—
1920	610		−3.6%
1930	750		23.0%
1940	700		−6.7%
1950	1,045		49.3%
1960	837		−19.9%
1970	700		−16.4%
1980	929		32.7%
1990	731		−21.3%
2000	656		−10.3%
2010	602		−8.2%
2020	504		−16.3%
U.S. Decennial Census

As of the census of 2000, there were 656 people, 250 households, and 160 families residing in the town. The population density was 623.2 inhabitants per square mile (240.6/km^{2}). There were 320 housing units at an average density of 304.0 per square mile (117.4/km^{2}). The racial makeup of the town was 61.43% White, 6.25% African American, 1.22% Native American, 27.59% from other races, and 3.51% from two or more races. Hispanic or Latino of any race were 46.04% of the population.

There were 250 households, out of which 28.8% had children under the age of 18 living with them, 46.0% were married couples living together, 13.6% had a female householder with no husband present, and 36.0% were non-families. 33.2% of all households were made up of individuals, and 19.6% had someone living alone who was 65 years of age or older. The average household size was 2.51 and the average family size was 3.26.

In the town, the population was spread out, with 28.0% under the age of 18, 7.5% from 18 to 24, 22.6% from 25 to 44, 19.8% from 45 to 64, and 22.1% who were 65 years of age or older. The median age was 37 years. For every 100 females, there were 84.8 males. For every 100 females age 18 and over, there were 76.1 males.

The median income for a household in the town was $20,852, and the median income for a family was $26,944. Males had a median income of $22,381 versus $14,375 for females. The per capita income for the town was $12,540. About 22.6% of families and 28.7% of the population were below the poverty line, including 38.7% of those under age 18 and 22.5% of those age 65 or over.

== Education ==
The Town of Loraine is served by the Loraine Independent School District.

== Notable people ==
- George H. Mahon, longtime member of the United States House of Representatives, resided in Loraine as a youth
- J. D. Sheffield, a Republican member of the Texas House of Representatives from Coryell County, was born in Loraine in 1960. He is a physician in Gatesville, Texas
- Glenn Smiley, The Reverend and civil rights consultant and leader, was born in Loraine on April 19, 1910
- Michi Atkins, was a professional basketball player in the WNBA. She was drafted by the Charlotte Sting in the 1997 WNBA elite draft. She also played professionally in Israel. She left Texas Tech as the Southwestern Athletic Conference all-time leader in points scored with 2,134.

== Gallery ==
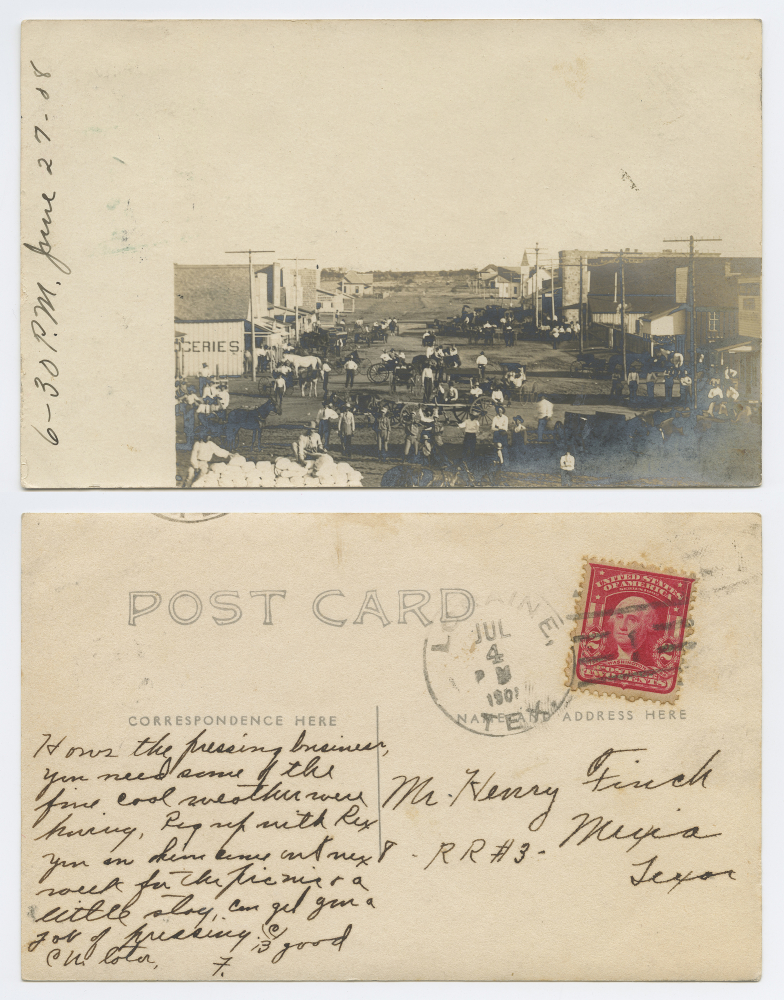
1908 Postcard.

== See also ==
- List of municipalities in Texas
