= Champion Creek Reservoir =

Lake in Texas

- Location of Champion Creek Reservoir in Texas Location of Champion Creek Reservoir in the United States
- Coordinates: 32°17′38″N 100°50′44″W
- Surface area: 97 acres (39 ha)
- Max. depth: 49 feet (15 m)
- Surface elevation: 2,057 feet (627 m)

Champion Creek Reservoir is a reservoir located south of Colorado City, Texas. The lake is part of the Colorado River basin.
