= Troy Fraser =

American politician

Troy Lynn Fraser

Member of the Texas Senate from the 24th district
- In office January 14, 1997 – January 10, 2017
- Preceded by: Bill Sims
- Succeeded by: Dawn Buckingham

Texas State Representative for District 69 (then Borden, Crane, Culberson, Glasscock, Howard, Hudspeth, Jeff Davis, Loving, Reagan, Reeves, Upton, Ward, and Winkler counties)
- In office November 15, 1988 – January 12, 1993
- Preceded by: Larry Don Shaw
- Succeeded by: John Hirschi (reconfigured district)

Personal details
- Born: August 10, 1949 (age 77) Abilene, Taylor County, Texas, USA
- Party: Republican
- Spouse: Linda S. Fraser
- Education: Angelo State University; University of Texas at Arlington
- Occupation: Businessman

Troy Lynn Fraser (born 10 August 1949) is a Republican former member of the Texas State Senate. From 1997 through his retirement in 2016, he held the 24th District seat, which encompasses all or parts of the counties of Bandera, Bell, Blanco, Brown, Burnet, Callahan, Comanche, Coryell, Gillespie, Hamilton, Kerr, Lampasas, Llano, Mills, San Saba, Taylor, and Travis.

== Biography ==
A resident of Horseshoe Bay in Llano County west of the capital city of Austin, Fraser also served in the Texas House of Representatives from 1988 to 1993 for District 69, then based about Big Spring in Howard County. He was preceded and succeeded by Democrats Larry D. Shaw of Big Spring and John Hirschi of Wichita Falls, elected in 1992 in a reconfigured district.

In January 2017, he retired from the Senate. In his statement of departure, Fraser said: "For twenty-seven years, I have walked the halls of our magnificent Capitol building. I have marveled at its dome, gazed upon the Goddess of Liberty and dedicated myself to my constituents. To quote the late Bob Bullock, 'only death will end my love affair with Texas.' It's been a great ride."

Fraser said that he is most pleased of his legislation which now requires photo identification for voting in Texas, a measure which he said "ensures the integrity of the ballot box and protects our most sacred privilege." He was Texas Senate President Pro Tempore in 2009. The American Conservative Union gave him a lifetime rating of 94%

Six candidates sought to succeed Fraser in the Republican primary scheduled for March 1, 2016.

== Election history ==
Senate election history of Fraser from 1992.

=== Most recent election ===
==== 2004 ====
Texas general election, 2004: Senate District 24
Party	Candidate	Votes	%	±%
Republican	Troy Fraser (Incumbent)	189,778	100.00	+9.53
Majority		189,778	100.00	+19.06
Turnout		189,778		+40.32
Republican hold				

=== Previous elections ===
==== 2002 ====
Texas general election, 2002: Senate District 24
Party	Candidate	Votes	%	±%
Republican	Troy Fraser (Incumbent)	122,355	90.47	−9.53
Libertarian	Steve Kirby	12,887	9.53	+9.53
Majority		109,468	80.94	−19.06
Turnout		135,242		+3.31
Republican hold				

==== 2000 ====
Texas general election, 2000: Senate District 24
Party	Candidate	Votes	%	±%
Republican	Troy Fraser (Incumbent)	130,913	100.00	+48.15
Majority		130,913	100.00	+96.30
Turnout		130,913		−21.82
Republican hold				

==== 1996 ====
Texas general election, 1996: Senate District 24
Party	Candidate	Votes	%	±%
Republican	Troy Fraser	86,828	51.85	+5.20
Democratic	Rick Rhodes	80,632	48.15	−5.20
Majority		6,196	3.70	−3.01
Turnout		167,460		+32.29
Republican gain from Democratic				

Republican primary, 1996: Senate District 24
Candidate		Votes	%	±
	Bob Barina	4,204	18.91	
✓	Troy Fraser	18,028	81.09	
Majority		13,824	62.18	
Turnout				

==== 1992 ====
Texas general election, 1992: Senate District 25
Party	Candidate	Votes	%	±%
Democratic	Bill Sims (Incumbent)	98,763	51.74	
Republican	Troy Fraser	92,107	48.26	
Majority		6,656	3.49	
Turnout		190,870		
Democratic hold				

Republican primary, 1992: Senate District 25
Candidate		Votes	%	±
	Jim Deats	6,641	25.36	
✓	Troy Fraser	15,076	57.58	
	Charles Johnson	4,467	17.06	
Majority		8,435	32.21	
Turnout				

Texas House of Representatives
Preceded by Larry Don Shaw	Member of the Texas House of Representatives from District 69 (Big Spring); 1988–1993	Succeeded by John Hirschi
Texas Senate
Preceded by Bill Sims	Texas State Senator from District 24 (Horseshoe Bay)^{(1)} 1997-2017	Succeeded by Dawn Buckingham
Notes and references
1. For the 75th through the 76th Legislatures, Fraser’s home city was Belton
