= Julius Real =

American politician (1860–1944)

Member of the Texas Senate from the 24th district
- In office January 12, 1909 – January 12, 1915
- Preceded by: Robert B. Green
- Succeeded by: Carlos Bee

Member of the Texas Senate from the 26th district
- In office January 13, 1925 – January 8, 1929
- Preceded by: James H. Baugh
- Succeeded by: W. Albert Williamson

Personal details
- Born: May 7, 1860 near Kerrville, Texas, U.S.
- Died: May 29, 1944 (aged 84) Houston, Texas, U.S.
- Party: Republican
- Spouse: Marguerethe Koch Schmidt (m. 1886)
- Children: 1

Julius Real (May 7, 1860 – May 29, 1944) was an American politician from Texas who served as a Republican member of the Texas Senate. He was the only Republican to serve in the Texas Senate between the beginning of the twentieth century and the election of Henry Grover in 1967. He is the namesake of Real County, Texas.

== Biographical sketch ==
Julius Real was born near Kerrville, Texas, on May 7, 1860, on a ranch along Turtle Creek to parents Caspar and Emelie (Schreiner) Real. He married Marguerethe Koch Schmidt on February 23, 1886 and they had one child. He was elected to the Texas Senate in 1908 to succeed Robert B. Green in the 24th district. For portions of his time in the Senate, he was its only Republican member. He served until 1915. He was elected again a decade later and served until 1929. Real died on May 29, 1944.
