= Lake Colorado City, Texas =

- Census-designated place
- Location within Texas Location within the United States
- Coordinates: 32°20′57″N 100°56′15″W
- Country: United States
- State: Texas
- County: Mitchell

Area
  - Total: 9.121 sq mi (23.62 km^{2})
  - Land: 7.755 sq mi (20.09 km^{2})
  - Water: 1.366 sq mi (3.54 km^{2})
- Elevation: 2,083 ft (635 m)

Population (2010)
  - Total: 588
  - Density: 75.8/sq mi (29.3/km^{2})
- Time zone: UTC-6 (Central (CST))
  - Summer (DST): UTC-5 (CDT)
- Area code: 325
- GNIS feature ID: 2586945

Lake Colorado City is an unincorporated community and census-designated place in Mitchell County, Texas, United States. As of the 2020 census, Lake Colorado City had a population of 636.

== Geography ==
According to the U.S. Census Bureau, the community has an area of 9.121 square miles (23.62 km^{2}); 7.755 square miles (20.09 km^{2}) of its area are land, and the rest is covered by water.

== Demographics ==
Historical population
Census	Pop.	Note	%±
2010	588		—
2020	636		8.2%
U.S. Decennial Census; 1850–1900 1910; 1920 1930 1940; 1950 1960 1970; 1980 1990 2000; 2010 2020

Lake Colorado City first appeared as a census-designated place in the 2010 U.S. census.

Lake Colorado City CDP, Texas – Racial and ethnic composition Note: the US Census treats Hispanic/Latino as an ethnic category. This table excludes Latinos from the racial categories and assigns them to a separate category. Hispanics/Latinos may be of any race.
Race / Ethnicity (NH = Non-Hispanic)	Pop 2010	Pop 2020	% 2010	% 2020
White alone (NH)	555	508	94.39%	79.87%
Black or African American alone (NH)	1	9	0.17%	1.42%
Native American or Alaska Native alone (NH)	2	5	0.34%	0.79%
Asian alone (NH)	0	3	0.00%	0.47%
Native Hawaiian or Pacific Islander alone (NH)	0	0	0.00%	0.00%
Other race alone (NH)	0	0	0.00%	0.00%
Mixed race or Multiracial (NH)	4	22	0.68%	3.46%
Hispanic or Latino (any race)	26	89	4.42%	13.99%
Total	588	636	100.00%	100.00%
