= Moyne Kelly =

American politician

Moyne LeClerque Kelly (October 29, 1901 – April 11, 1988) was an American politician from Texas.

Kelly was born on October 29, 1901 in Kentucky to John Hazard Kelly (1873 – 1908) and Rhoda Garetta Cline (1879 – 1966). He had an older brother, Eugene, and two younger siblings, Cecil and Vera. The family moved to Amarillo, Texas when he was a child.

Kelly won a special election in January 1955, and succeeded David Ratliff as a Democratic member of the Texas House of Representatives from District 85. Kelly retained his seat as a state representative during the November 1956 state legislative elections, and served until January 1959. During his tenure as a state legislator, Kelly lived in Afton.

Kelly married Helen Jones and had two daughters. He passed away on April 11, 1988 in Wharton, Texas.
