= Bill Tippen =

American politician (1922–1994)

William Kenton Tippen (6 September 1922 – 14 April 1994) was an American politician from Texas.

Tippen was born on 6 September 1922 in Brownwood, Texas. When he was 12, his family moved to Abilene, where he graduated from Abilene High School. He then earned a bachelor's degree from Hardin–Simmons University in 1943 and served in the Counterintelligence Corps during World War II, alongside the Fifth Army. Following his discharge from active duty in 1945, he enrolled at the University of Texas Law School and married Elsie Murphree in 1946. While pursuing his degree in law, which he completed in 1949, Tippen was elected to two full terms as a Democratic member of the Texas House of Representatives from District 116. Tippen served as a state representative from 1947 to 1951. After stepping down at the end of his second consecutive term, he was elected to two terms each as Taylor County attorney and 104th District attorney. He founded a private legal practice in Abilene in 1956 and retired from his firm in 1988. Between 1959 and 1979, Tippen was a trustee of Hardin–Simmons University. This stint included seven years as chairman of the board of trustees. In June 1972, Tippen won a special election for District 24 of the Texas Senate, and replaced David Ratliff in office. Upon completing Ratliff's term in 1973, Tippen was appointed to a position on the Texas Commission on Law Enforcement Officer Standards and Education by governor Dolph Briscoe, which he held for six years. Tippen died on 14 April 1994.
