= David Farabee =

American politician

Member of the Texas House of Representatives from the 69th district
- In office 1999–2011
- Preceded by: John Hirschi
- Succeeded by: Lanham Lyne

Personal details
- Party: Democratic

David L. Farabee is a former member of the Texas House of Representatives. He represented Wichita Falls for six terms, beginning with his first electoral victory in 1998.

== Background ==
Despite Wichita Falls being a strongly conservative district, David Farabee won his races as a Democrat, primarily based on name recognition. His father Ray Farabee was an attorney who served in the Texas Senate and as general counsel for the University of Texas System.

In 2007, the Austin Chronicle named Farabee and fellow legislator Joe Heflin as "the most conservative Dems" in the legislature.
