= Colorado Independent School District =

School district in Texas

Colorado Independent School District is a public school district based in Colorado City, Texas (USA).

Located in Mitchell County, a very small portion of the district extends into Scurry County.

In 2009, the school district was rated "academically acceptable" by the Texas Education Agency.

== Schools ==
- Colorado High School (Grades 9–12)
- Colorado Elementary and Middle (Grades PK-8)
- Wallace Accelerated High School

== Notable alumni ==
- Jay Boy Adams (Class of 1967), singer, songwriter, guitarist
