= Loraine Independent School District =

School district in Texas

Coordinates: 32.3267°N 100.7330°W

Loraine Independent School District is a public school district based in Loraine, Texas (USA).

The district has one school that serves students in grades pre-kindergarten through twelve.

== Academic achievement ==
In 2009, the school district was rated "academically acceptable" by the Texas Education Agency.

== Special programs ==
=== Athletics ===
Loraine High School plays six-man football.

== See also ==
- List of school districts in Texas
