= Westbrook, Texas =

- City
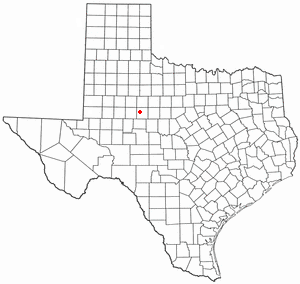
- Location of Westbrook, Texas

- Coordinates: 32°21′25″N 101°0′45″W
- Country: United States
- State: Texas
- County: Mitchell

Area
  - Total: 0.42 sq mi (1.09 km^{2})
  - Land: 0.42 sq mi (1.09 km^{2})
  - Water: 0 sq mi (0.00 km^{2})
- Elevation: 2,162 ft (659 m)

Population (2020)
  - Total: 201
  - Density: 478/sq mi (184/km^{2})
- Time zone: UTC-6 (Central (CST))
  - Summer (DST): UTC-5 (CDT)
- ZIP code: 79565
- Area code: 325
- FIPS code: 48-77380
- GNIS feature ID: 1349851

Westbrook is a city in Mitchell County, Texas, United States. The population was 201 at the 2020 census.

== History ==
The Westbrook Oil Field was discovered on March 5, 1921, when the Texas and Pacific Abrams No. 1 well was completed to a depth of 2498 feet. L.W. Sandusky and P.C. Coleman convinced the Underwriters Producing and Refining Company to drill a test well, which was spudded on February 8, 1920. A subsidiary of Standard Oil of California, the California Company, bought the Underwriters' property in December 1922. By 1926, there were 77 producing wells, with total production amounting to 3400 barrels. Production is from a dolomitic limestone within the Permian Basin.

== Geography ==
Westbrook is located at 32°21′25″N 101°0′45″W (32.357027, −101.012552).

According to the United States Census Bureau, the city has a total area of 0.4 square miles (1.0 km^{2}), all land.

== Demographics ==
Historical population
Census	Pop.	Note	%±
1930	512		—
1960	214		—
1970	298		39.3%
1980	298		0.0%
1990	237		−20.5%
2000	203		−14.3%
2010	253		24.6%
2020	201		−20.6%
U.S. Decennial Census; 2020 Census

=== 2020 census ===
As of the 2020 census, Westbrook had a population of 201. The median age was 43.3 years, 29.4% of residents were under the age of 18, and 12.9% of residents were 65 years of age or older. For every 100 females there were 113.8 males, and for every 100 females age 18 and over there were 100.0 males age 18 and over.

0.0% of residents lived in urban areas, while 100.0% lived in rural areas.

There were 82 households in Westbrook, of which 42.7% had children under the age of 18 living in them. Of all households, 51.2% were married-couple households, 18.3% were households with a male householder and no spouse or partner present, and 28.0% were households with a female householder and no spouse or partner present. About 21.9% of all households were made up of individuals and 15.9% had someone living alone who was 65 years of age or older.

There were 101 housing units, of which 18.8% were vacant. The homeowner vacancy rate was 0.0% and the rental vacancy rate was 13.6%.

Racial composition as of the 2020 census
Race	Number	Percent
White	169	84.1%
Black or African American	0	0.0%
American Indian and Alaska Native	1	0.5%
Asian	0	0.0%
Native Hawaiian and Other Pacific Islander	0	0.0%
Some other race	16	8.0%
Two or more races	15	7.5%
Hispanic or Latino (of any race)	50	24.9%

=== 2000 census ===
As of the 2000 census, 203 people, 79 households, and 54 families resided in the city. The population density was 504.3 inhabitants per square mile (194.7/km^{2}). The 103 housing units averaged 255.9/sq mi (99.4/km^{2}). The racial makeup of the city was 89.66% White, 0.49% Native American, 8.87% from other races, and 0.99% from two or more races. Hispanics or Latinos of any race were 25.62% of the population.

Of the 79 households, 34.2% had children under the age of 18 living with them, 50.6% were married couples living together, 11.4% had a female householder with no husband present, and 31.6% were not families; 30.4% of all households were made up of individuals, and 13.9% had someone living alone who was 65 years of age or older. The average household size was 2.57 and the average family size was 3.17.

In the city, the population was distributed as 30.0% under the age of 18, 5.4% from 18 to 24, 28.1% from 25 to 44, 21.7% from 45 to 64, and 14.8% who were 65 years of age or older. The median age was 36 years. For every 100 females, there were 89.7 males. For every 100 females age 18 and over, there were 91.9 males.

The median income for a household in the city was $27,143, and for a family was $38,281. Males had a median income of $23,750 versus $16,786 for females. The per capita income for the city was $13,500. About 13.1% of families and 18.4% of the population were below the poverty line, including 18.8% of those under the age of 18 and 14.3% of those 65 or over.

== Education ==
The city of Westbrook is served by the Westbrook Independent School District and home to the Westbrook High School (Texas) Wildcats.

== Notable people ==
- Ralph W. Ramsey, a Border Patrol inspector, was killed in the line of duty on February 26, 1942, in Columbus, New Mexico A forward operating base, "Camp Ramsey", west of Columbus, was named in his honor.
