= Mitchell County, Texas =

County in Texas, United States

- County
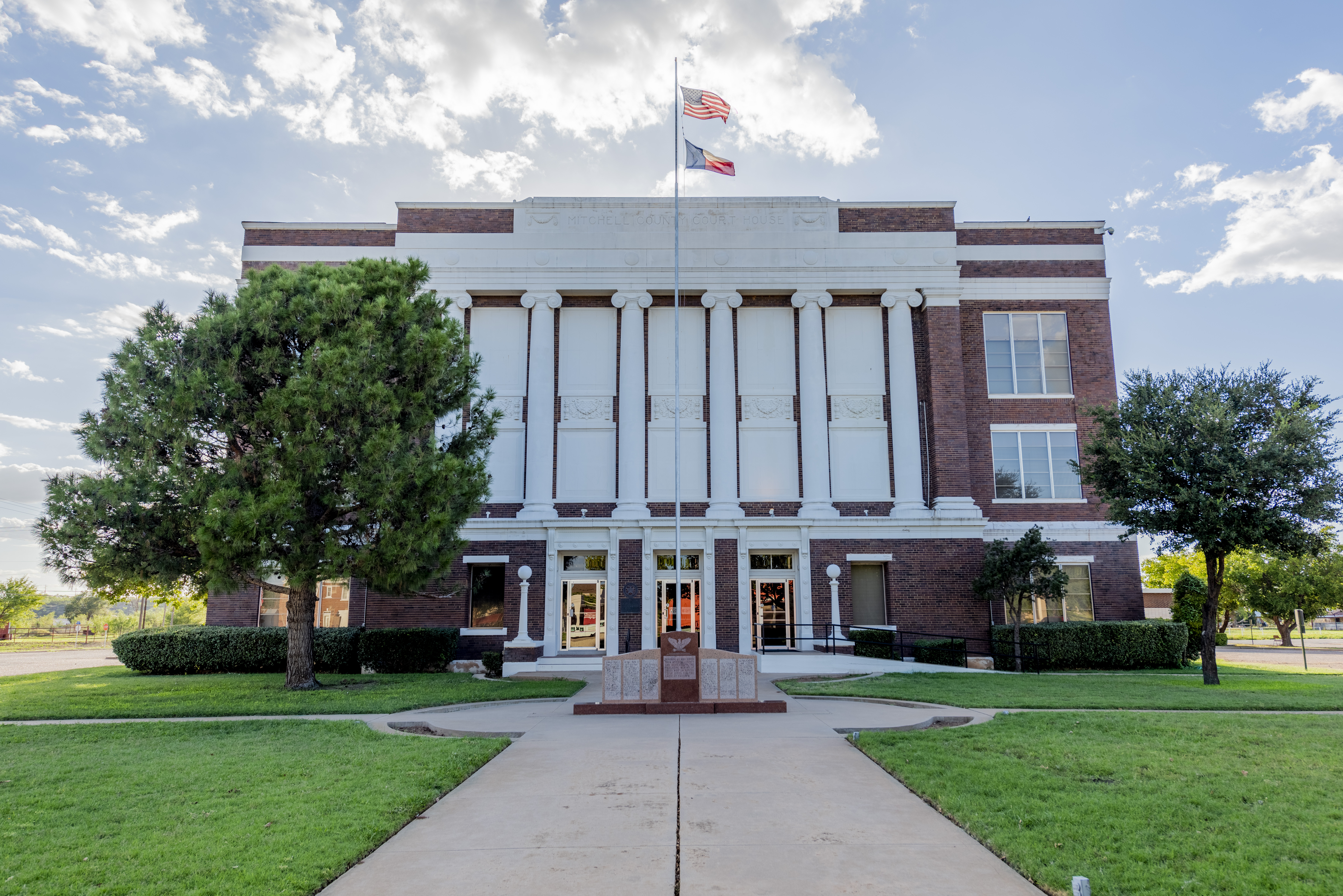
- The Mitchell County Courthouse in Colorado City

- Location within the U.S. state of Texas
- Coordinates: 32°18′N 100°55′W
- Country: United States
- State: Texas
- Founded: 1881
- Named for: Asa and Eli Mitchell
- Seat: Colorado City
- Largest city: Colorado City

Area
  - Total: 916 sq mi (2,370 km^{2})
  - Land: 911 sq mi (2,360 km^{2})
  - Water: 4.8 sq mi (12 km^{2}) 0.5%

Population (2020)
  - Total: 8,990
  - Estimate (2025): 8,947 ▼
  - Density: 9.87/sq mi (3.81/km^{2})
- Time zone: UTC−6 (Central)
  - Summer (DST): UTC−5 (CDT)
- Congressional district: 19th
- Website: www.co.mitchell.tx.us

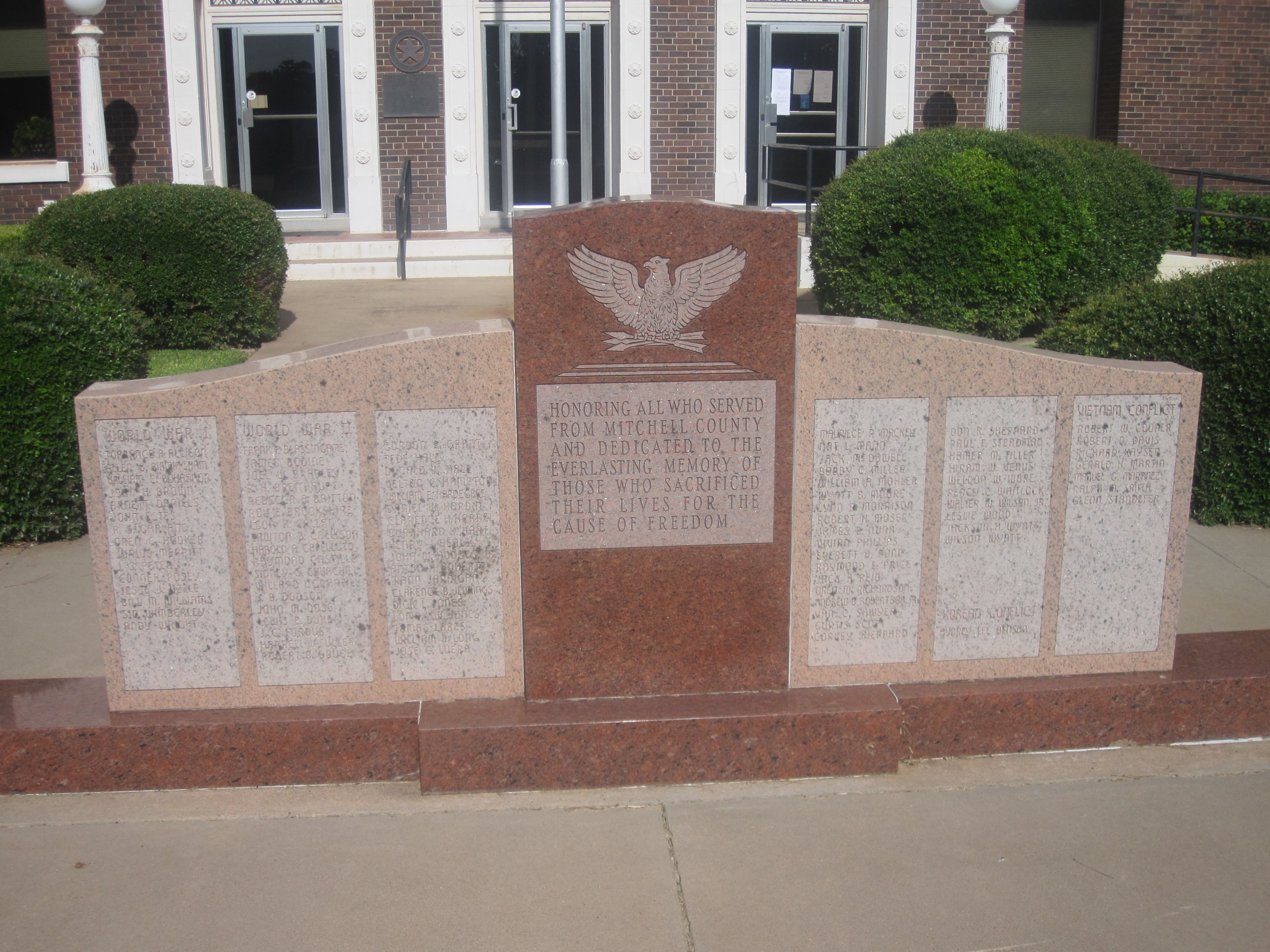
Veterans Monument in Mitchell County

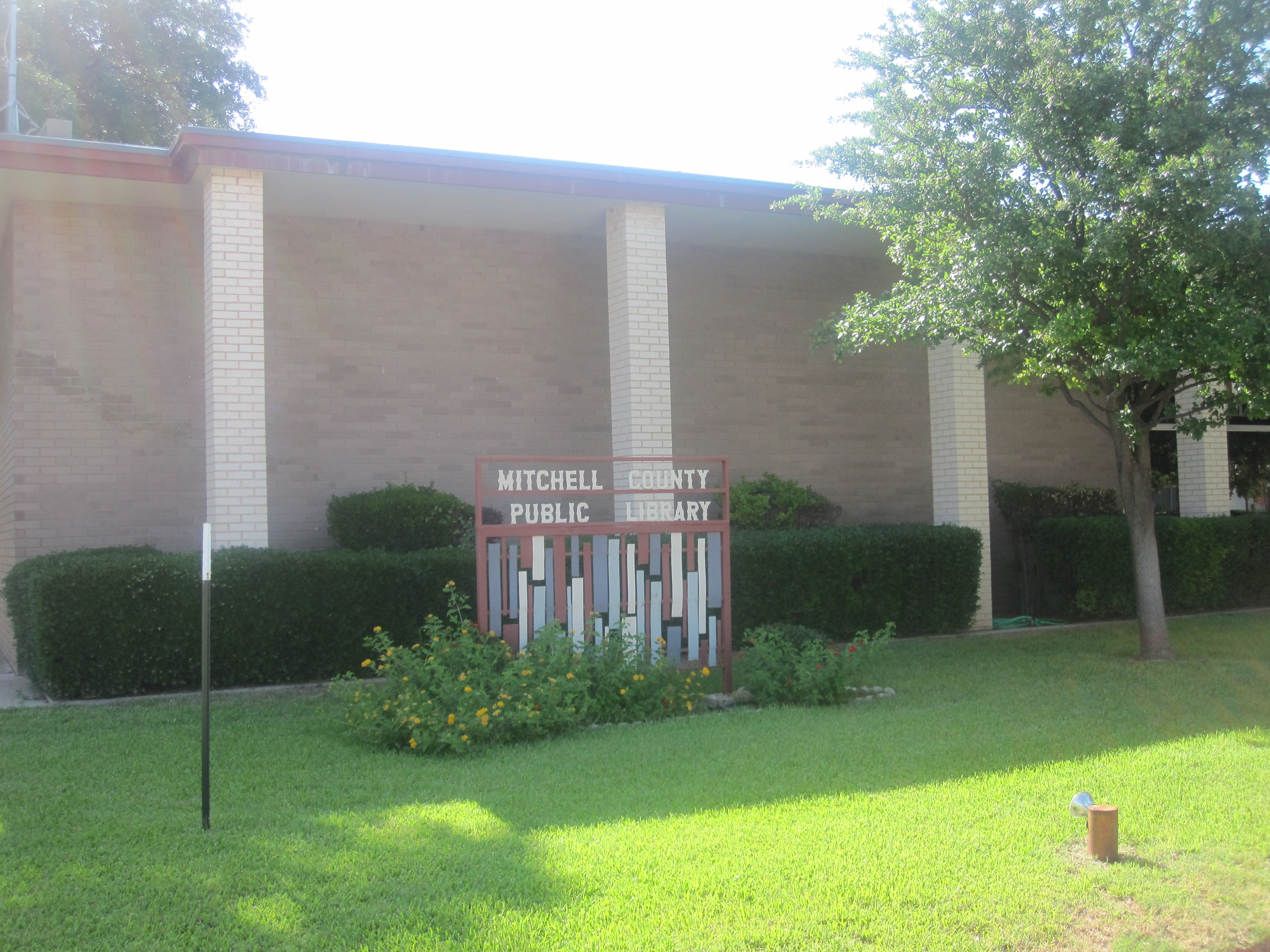
Mitchell County Public Library

Mitchell County is a county in the U.S. state of Texas. As of the 2020 census, its population was 8,990. Its county seat is Colorado City. The county was created in 1876 and organized in 1881. It is named for Asa and Eli Mitchell, two early settlers and soldiers in the Texas Revolution.

== Geography ==
According to the U.S. Census Bureau, the county has a total area of 916 square miles (2,370 km^{2}), of which 911 sq mi (2,360 km^{2}) are land and 4.8 sq mi (12 km^{2}) (0.5%) are covered by water. Mitchell County contains two reservoirs, Lake Colorado City and Lake Champion.

=== Major highways ===
- Interstate 20
  - I-20 BL (Colorado City)
  - I-20 BL (Westbrook)
- U.S. Highway 84
- State Highway 163
- State Highway 208
- State Highway 350

=== Adjacent counties ===
- Scurry County (north)
- Fisher County (northeast)
- Nolan County (east)
- Coke County (southeast)
- Sterling County (south)
- Howard County (west)
- Borden County (northwest)

== Demographics ==
Historical population
| Census | Pop. | Note | %± |
|---|---|---|---|
| 1880 | 117 | | — |
| 1890 | 2,059 | | 1,659.8% |
| 1900 | 2,855 | | 38.7% |
| 1910 | 8,956 | | 213.7% |
| 1920 | 7,527 | | −16.0% |
| 1930 | 14,183 | | 88.4% |
| 1940 | 12,477 | | −12.0% |
| 1950 | 14,357 | | 15.1% |
| 1960 | 11,255 | | −21.6% |
| 1970 | 9,073 | | −19.4% |
| 1980 | 9,088 | | 0.2% |
| 1990 | 8,016 | | −11.8% |
| 2000 | 9,698 | | 21.0% |
| 2010 | 9,403 | | −3.0% |
| 2020 | 8,990 | | −4.4% |
| 2025 (est.) | 8,947 | ▼ | −0.5% |
U.S. Decennial Census; 1850–2010 2010 2020

=== Racial and ethnic composition ===
Mitchell County, Texas – Racial and ethnic composition Note: the US Census treats Hispanic/Latino as an ethnic category. This table excludes Latinos from the racial categories and assigns them to a separate category. Hispanics/Latinos may be of any race.
| Race / Ethnicity (NH = Non-Hispanic) | Pop 2000 | Pop 2010 | Pop 2020 | % 2000 | % 2010 | % 2020 |
|---|---|---|---|---|---|---|
| White alone (NH) | 5,341 | 4,753 | 4,328 | 55.07% | 50.55% | 48.14% |
| Black or African American alone (NH) | 1,229 | 1,043 | 925 | 12.67% | 11.09% | 10.29% |
| Native American or Alaska Native alone (NH) | 28 | 44 | 34 | 0.29% | 0.47% | 0.38% |
| Asian alone (NH) | 34 | 27 | 54 | 0.35% | 0.29% | 0.60% |
| Pacific Islander alone (NH) | 2 | 0 | 1 | 0.02% | 0.00% | 0.01% |
| Other race alone (NH) | 9 | 10 | 11 | 0.09% | 0.11% | 0.12% |
| Mixed race or Multiracial (NH) | 46 | 45 | 183 | 0.47% | 0.48% | 2.04% |
| Hispanic or Latino (any race) | 3,009 | 3,481 | 3,454 | 31.03% | 37.02% | 38.42% |
| Total | 9,698 | 9,403 | 8,990 | 100.00% | 100.00% | 100.00% |

=== 2020 census ===
As of the 2020 census, the county had a population of 8,990. The median age was 36.5 years. 19.7% of residents were under the age of 18 and 14.8% of residents were 65 years of age or older. For every 100 females there were 157.2 males, and for every 100 females age 18 and over there were 172.5 males age 18 and over.

The racial makeup of the county was 60.1% White, 10.7% Black or African American, 1.0% American Indian and Alaska Native, 0.6% Asian, <0.1% Native Hawaiian and Pacific Islander, 18.0% from some other race, and 9.7% from two or more races. Hispanic or Latino residents of any race comprised 38.4% of the population.

64.9% of residents lived in urban areas, while 35.1% lived in rural areas.

There were 2,761 households in the county, of which 33.5% had children under the age of 18 living in them. Of all households, 46.7% were married-couple households, 21.4% were households with a male householder and no spouse or partner present, and 26.4% were households with a female householder and no spouse or partner present. About 28.9% of all households were made up of individuals and 14.2% had someone living alone who was 65 years of age or older.

There were 3,684 housing units, of which 25.1% were vacant. Among occupied housing units, 70.8% were owner-occupied and 29.2% were renter-occupied. The homeowner vacancy rate was 3.9% and the rental vacancy rate was 13.1%.

=== 2000 census ===
As of the census of 2000, 9,698 people, 2,837 households, and 1,997 families resided in the county. The population density was 11 people per square mile (4.2 people/km^{2}). The 4,168 housing units averaged five per square mile (2/km^{2}). The racial makeup of the county was 74.52% White, 12.81% Black or African American, 0.41% Native American, 0.36% Asian, 0.02% Pacific Islander, 10.19% from other races, and 1.69% from two or more races; 31.03% of the population was Hispanic or Latino of any race.

Of the 2,837 households, 30.60% had children under the age of 18 living with them, 55.60% were married couples living together, 11.40% had a female householder with no husband present, and 29.60% were not families; 27.50% of all households were made up of individuals, and 15.50% had someone living alone who was 65 years of age or older. The average household size was 2.48 and the average family size was 3.00.

In the county, the population was distributed as 19.80% under the age of 18, 11.50% from 18 to 24, 30.70% from 25 to 44, 22.90% from 45 to 64, and 15.10% who were 65 years of age or older. The median age was 39 years. For every 100 females, there were 159.30 males. For every 100 females age 18 and over, there were 174.40 males.

The median income for a household in the county was $25,399, and for a family was $31,481. Males had a median income of $23,750 versus $20,221 for females. The per capita income for the county was $14,043. About 15.00% of families and 17.70% of the population were below the poverty line, including 22.90% of those under age 18 and 20.90% of those age 65 or over.

== Communities ==
=== Cities ===
- Colorado City (county seat)
- Westbrook

=== Town ===
- Loraine

=== Census-designated place ===
- Lake Colorado City

=== Unincorporated communities ===
- Buford

=== Ghost towns ===
- Cuthbert
- Hyman
- Iatan
- Spade
- Valley View

== Politics ==
United States presidential election results for Mitchell County, Texas
| Year | Republican | | Democratic | | Third party(ies) | |
| Year | No. | % | No. | % | No. | % |
|---|---|---|---|---|---|---|
| 1912 | 19 | 2.69% | 573 | 81.05% | 115 | 16.27% |
| 1916 | 39 | 4.23% | 803 | 87.00% | 81 | 8.78% |
| 1920 | 89 | 10.47% | 694 | 81.65% | 67 | 7.88% |
| 1924 | 169 | 11.69% | 1,242 | 85.89% | 35 | 2.42% |
| 1928 | 1,099 | 59.57% | 746 | 40.43% | 0 | 0.00% |
| 1932 | 148 | 9.02% | 1,490 | 90.85% | 2 | 0.12% |
| 1936 | 192 | 8.61% | 2,035 | 91.21% | 4 | 0.18% |
| 1940 | 251 | 9.45% | 2,401 | 90.37% | 5 | 0.19% |
| 1944 | 218 | 8.47% | 2,215 | 86.09% | 140 | 5.44% |
| 1948 | 230 | 9.26% | 2,181 | 87.80% | 73 | 2.94% |
| 1952 | 1,417 | 40.95% | 2,031 | 58.70% | 12 | 0.35% |
| 1956 | 1,091 | 36.59% | 1,891 | 63.41% | 0 | 0.00% |
| 1960 | 1,208 | 36.06% | 2,131 | 63.61% | 11 | 0.33% |
| 1964 | 737 | 23.33% | 2,420 | 76.61% | 2 | 0.06% |
| 1968 | 893 | 29.96% | 1,589 | 53.30% | 499 | 16.74% |
| 1972 | 1,790 | 71.83% | 699 | 28.05% | 3 | 0.12% |
| 1976 | 1,058 | 37.73% | 1,730 | 61.70% | 16 | 0.57% |
| 1980 | 1,455 | 49.73% | 1,446 | 49.42% | 25 | 0.85% |
| 1984 | 2,007 | 59.79% | 1,332 | 39.68% | 18 | 0.54% |
| 1988 | 1,596 | 47.27% | 1,773 | 52.52% | 7 | 0.21% |
| 1992 | 1,128 | 36.47% | 1,353 | 43.74% | 612 | 19.79% |
| 1996 | 949 | 39.46% | 1,213 | 50.44% | 243 | 10.10% |
| 2000 | 1,708 | 66.36% | 837 | 32.52% | 29 | 1.13% |
| 2004 | 1,912 | 74.75% | 639 | 24.98% | 7 | 0.27% |
| 2008 | 1,815 | 74.66% | 586 | 24.11% | 30 | 1.23% |
| 2012 | 1,756 | 75.82% | 538 | 23.23% | 22 | 0.95% |
| 2016 | 1,780 | 81.06% | 354 | 16.12% | 62 | 2.82% |
| 2020 | 2,170 | 84.11% | 397 | 15.39% | 13 | 0.50% |
| 2024 | 2,144 | 85.32% | 352 | 14.01% | 17 | 0.68% |

United States Senate election results for Mitchell County, Texas1
| Year | Republican | | Democratic | | Third party(ies) | |
| Year | No. | % | No. | % | No. | % |
|---|---|---|---|---|---|---|
| 2024 | 2,059 | 83.26% | 374 | 15.12% | 40 | 1.62% |

United States Senate election results for Mitchell County, Texas2
| Year | Republican | | Democratic | | Third party(ies) | |
| Year | No. | % | No. | % | No. | % |
|---|---|---|---|---|---|---|
| 2020 | 2,129 | 83.82% | 359 | 14.13% | 52 | 2.05% |

Texas Gubernatorial election results for Mitchell County
| Year | Republican | | Democratic | | Third party(ies) | |
| Year | No. | % | No. | % | No. | % |
|---|---|---|---|---|---|---|
| 2022 | 1,576 | 88.49% | 185 | 10.39% | 20 | 1.12% |

== Education ==
School districts include:

- Colorado Independent School District
- Forsan Independent School District
- Ira Independent School District
- Loraine Independent School District
- Roscoe Collegiate Independent School District
- Westbrook Independent School District

The Texas Legislature designated the county as being in the Western Texas College District.

== See also ==
- National Register of Historic Places listings in Mitchell County, Texas
- Recorded Texas Historic Landmarks in Mitchell County
