= Colorado City, Texas =

City in the United States

- City
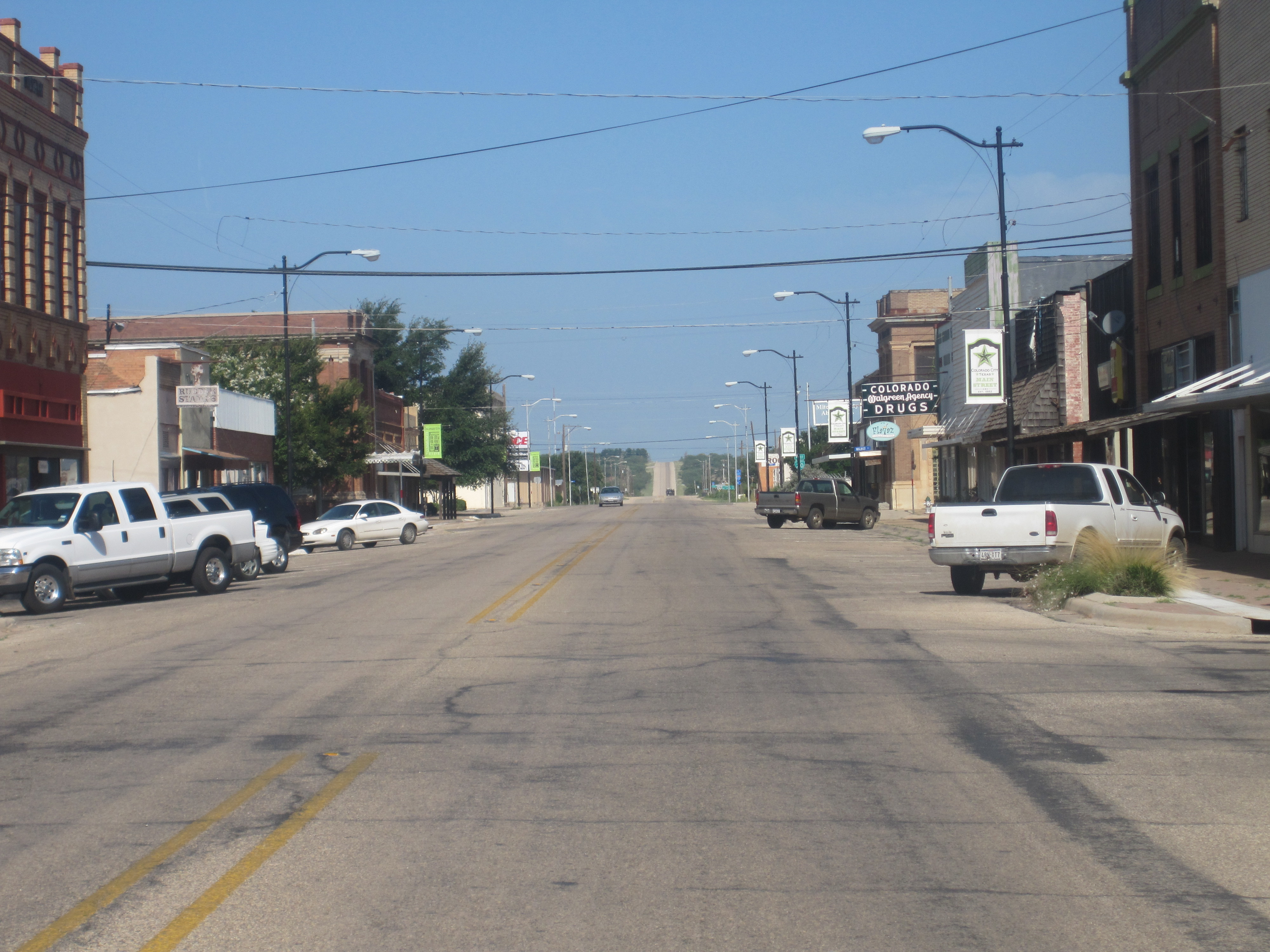
- Downtown Colorado City

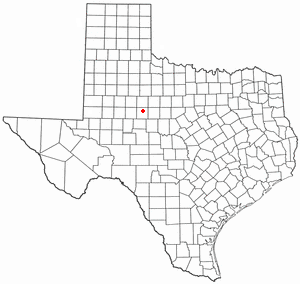
- Location of Colorado City, Texas

- Coordinates: 32°23′46″N 100°51′44″W
- Country: United States
- State: Texas
- County: Mitchell

Government
  - Mayor: Ruben Hurt

Area
  - Total: 5.33 sq mi (13.81 km^{2})
  - Land: 5.33 sq mi (13.81 km^{2})
  - Water: 0 sq mi (0.00 km^{2})
- Elevation: 2,070 ft (630 m)

Population (2020)
  - Total: 3,991
  - Density: 748.5/sq mi (289.0/km^{2})
  - Demonym: Colorado Citian
- Time zone: UTC−6 (Central (CST))
  - Summer (DST): UTC−5 (CDT)
- ZIP Code: 79512
- Area code: 325
- FIPS code: 48-16120
- GNIS feature ID: 1333141
- Website: www.coloradocitytexas.org

Colorado City (/ˌkɒləˈreɪdə/ kahl-uh-RAY-dō) is a city in and the county seat of Mitchell County, Texas, United States. Its population was 3,991 at the 2020 census.

== History ==
Colorado City originated as a ranger camp in 1877. It grew into a cattlemen's center and has been called "the Mother City of West Texas". The town acquired a railway station and post office in 1881 and was named the county seat. In the early 1880s, it was a center for cattle shipment, with herds driven to Colorado City and loaded onto trains for shipment to the eastern markets. Its population was estimated at 6,000 in 1884–1885, but dropped to 2,500 by 1890 after a drought, and dropped further with the growth of nearby San Angelo.

The first school was conducted in a dugout in 1881 and moved to a building the next year. During the late 19th and 20th centuries, economic activity centered successively on salt mining, then farming, then oil production. By 1910, the town had a new public school, a waterworks, and an electric plant. A city hall was built by 1926.

An oil refinery began operation in 1924 and closed in 1969. Other industries included a meat-packing operation and a mobile home factory.

=== Hailey Dunn disappearance ===
On December 26, 2010, a 13-year-old girl named Hailey Dunn disappeared on the way to her father's house to spend the night. Her body was found in 2013 in Scurry County, Texas. Her mother's boyfriend was long suspected for Hailey's death and told police she was in Scurry County, but in 2023, the prosecution dropped the case against him based on advice from the FBI.

== Geography ==
According to the United States Census Bureau, the city has a total area of 5.3 sq mi (14 km^{2}), all land. Colorado City is situated along the Colorado River to the west and Lone Wolf Creek to the east.

=== Climate ===
According to the Köppen climate classification, Colorado City has a semiarid climate, BSk on climate maps.

Climate data for Colorado City, Texas, 1991–2020 normals, extremes 1900–2009
Month	Jan	Feb	Mar	Apr	May	Jun	Jul	Aug	Sep	Oct	Nov	Dec	Year
Record high °F (°C)	91 (33)	99 (37)	98 (37)	101 (38)	110 (43)	115 (46)	112 (44)	110 (43)	107 (42)	103 (39)	91 (33)	89 (32)	115 (46)
Mean daily maximum °F (°C)	57.9 (14.4)	62.1 (16.7)	70.2 (21.2)	80.5 (26.9)	87.2 (30.7)	93.1 (33.9)	96.7 (35.9)	95.6 (35.3)	88.1 (31.2)	79.3 (26.3)	67.0 (19.4)	59.0 (15.0)	78.1 (25.6)
Daily mean °F (°C)	43.0 (6.1)	46.6 (8.1)	55.3 (12.9)	63.6 (17.6)	73.2 (22.9)	80.0 (26.7)	83.7 (28.7)	82.1 (27.8)	74.9 (23.8)	64.8 (18.2)	52.3 (11.3)	44.0 (6.7)	63.6 (17.6)
Mean daily minimum °F (°C)	28.2 (−2.1)	31.2 (−0.4)	40.4 (4.7)	46.6 (8.1)	59.3 (15.2)	66.8 (19.3)	70.7 (21.5)	68.6 (20.3)	61.7 (16.5)	50.2 (10.1)	37.5 (3.1)	29.1 (−1.6)	49.2 (9.6)
Record low °F (°C)	−7 (−22)	−1 (−18)	8 (−13)	23 (−5)	27 (−3)	42 (6)	51 (11)	51 (11)	33 (1)	22 (−6)	3 (−16)	2 (−17)	−7 (−22)
Average precipitation inches (mm)	0.90 (23)	1.32 (34)	1.68 (43)	1.54 (39)	2.15 (55)	3.05 (77)	1.96 (50)	2.96 (75)	1.90 (48)	2.31 (59)	1.19 (30)	1.04 (26)	22.00 (559)
Average snowfall inches (cm)	0.2 (0.51)	0.1 (0.25)	0.0 (0.0)	0.0 (0.0)	0.0 (0.0)	0.0 (0.0)	0.0 (0.0)	0.0 (0.0)	0.0 (0.0)	0.0 (0.0)	1.2 (3.0)	0.1 (0.25)	1.6 (4.01)
Average precipitation days (≥ 0.01 in)	3.2	3.3	5.1	3.6	4.8	5.6	3.5	4.4	3.5	5.8	4.7	2.5	50.0
Average snowy days (≥ 0.1 in)	0.2	0.1	0.0	0.0	0.0	0.0	0.0	0.0	0.0	0.0	0.3	0.1	0.7
Source 1: NOAA
Source 2: National Weather Service

== Demographics ==
Historical population
Census	Pop.	Note	%±
1890	1,582		—
1910	1,840		—
1920	1,766		−4.0%
1930	4,671		164.5%
1940	5,213		11.6%
1950	6,774		29.9%
1960	6,457		−4.7%
1970	5,227		−19.0%
1980	5,405		3.4%
1990	4,749		−12.1%
2000	4,281		−9.9%
2010	4,146		−3.2%
2020	3,991		−3.7%
U.S. Decennial Census

=== 2020 census ===
As of the 2020 census, Colorado City had a population of 3,991, with 1,542 households and 728 families, and the median age was 37.1 years.

About 27.7% of residents were under 18 and 16.9% were 65 or older. For every 100 females, there were 96.3 males, and for every 100 females 18 and over, there were 91.1 males.

Of the 1,542 households in Colorado City, 36.4% had children under 18 living in them, 40.9% were married-couple households, 21.3% were households with a male householder and no spouse or partner present, and 31.0% were households with a female householder and no spouse or partner present. About 30.9% of all households were made up of individuals, and 14.9% had someone living alone who was 65 or older.

The 1,950 housing units had a 20.9% vacancy rate. Among occupied housing units, 63.0% were owner-occupied and 37.0% were renter-occupied. The homeowner vacancy rate was 4.6% and the rental vacancy rate was 14.2%.

Around 93.8% of residents lived in urban areas, while 6.2% lived in rural areas.

Racial composition as of the 2020 census
Race	Number	Percentage
White	2,561	64.2%
Black or African American	238	6.0%
American Indian and Alaska Native	62	1.6%
Asian	43	1.1%
Native Hawaiian and Other Pacific Islander	0	0%
Some other race	536	13.4%
Two or more races	551	13.8%
Hispanic or Latino (of any race)	1,815	45.5%

=== 2010 census ===
As of the census of 2010, 4,146 people, 1,646 households, and 1,124 families resided in the city. The population density was 809.2 inhabitants per square mile (312.4/km^{2}). The 2,076 housing units had an average density of 392.4 per square mile (151.5/km^{2}). The racial makeup of the city was 76.71% White, 5.09% African American, 0.54% Native American, 0.44% Asian, 14.62% from other races, and 2.59% from two or more races. Hispanics or Latinos of any race were 36.25% of the population.

Of the 1,646 households, 34.2% had children under 18 living with them, 50.7% were married couples living together, 14.0% had a female householder with no husband present, and 31.7% were not families. About 29.6% of all households were made up of individuals, and 16.7% had someone living alone who was 65 years of age or older. The average household size was 2.53 and the average family size was 3.12.

In the city, the age distribution was 28.5% under 18, 8.2% from 18 to 24, 24.0% from 25 to 44, 20.6% from 45 to 64, and 18.7% who were 65 or older. The median age was 36 years. For every 100 females, there were 90.4 males. For every 100 females age 18 and over, there were 83.2 males.

The median income for a household in the city was $22,842 and for a family was $27,363. Males had a median income of $22,272 versus $20,037 for females. The per capita income for the city was $15,591. About 18.7% of families and 20.6% of the population were below the poverty line, including 26.2% of those under 18 and 23.9% of those 65 or over.

== Education ==
Colorado City is served by the Colorado Independent School District.

== Notable people ==
- Dick Compton, played for the Detroit Lions, Houston Oilers, and the Pittsburgh Steelers, graduated from Colorado High School
- Martin Dies Jr., U.S. Congressman, was born in Colorado City
- Margaret Formby is the founder of the National Cowgirl Hall of Fame in Fort Worth
- George H. Mahon, U.S. Representative; was raised in Mitchell County and is honored with a statue in front of the courthouse
- Don Maynard, a Pro Football Hall of Fame member, graduated from Colorado High School

== See also ==
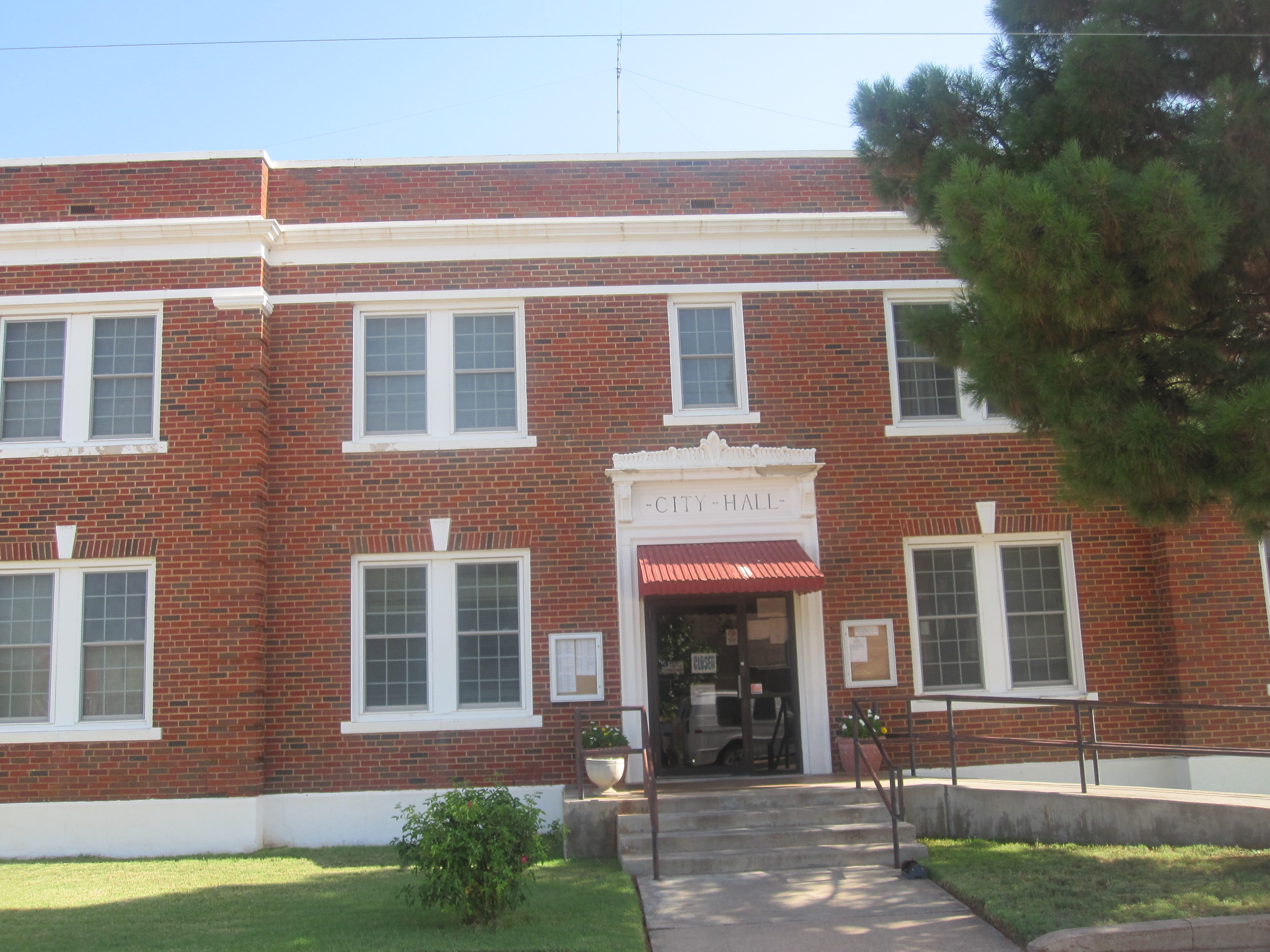
City hall

- Champion Creek Reservoir
