= Harley Sadler =

Texas showman and politician (1892–1954)

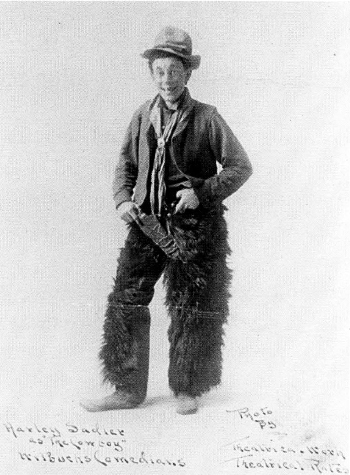
- Sadler in character, 1917 or 1918
- Born: September 4, 1892; Pleasant Plains, Arkansas, U.S.
- Died: October 15, 1954 (aged 62); Stamford, Texas, U.S.
- Resting place: Cameron, Texas
- Occupations: Tent show entertainer and operator; Politician
- Spouse: Willie Louise "Billie" Massengale (m. 1917–1954)
- Children: One daughter

Harley Herman Sadler (September 4, 1892 – October 14, 1954) was an American showman, oilman, and state legislator from Texas.

He is reportedly "the first man to make a million dollars from a tent show."

== Early years ==
The fourth of six children and the fifth son, Sadler was born near Pleasant Plains, Arkansas, to Junius and Lula T. Sadler. His father was a farmer turned general merchant who made a new home in Stamford, Texas. To the dismay of his father, Harley was stage-struck at an early age. His father harbored dreams of him becoming a lawyer. With little experience beyond the town band and teenage theatrical performances, Sadler dropped out of high school to follow the traveling tent shows passing through Stamford. He would trail a company until his money ran out, return home to work and refill his wallet, and then set out again. In 1908, he followed a carnival, The Parker Show, for so long, the manager offered him a job.

He was hired as a musician, but the hoped-for band did not materialize. Sadler wound up making spiels, selling novelties and doing odd jobs. In 1909, he made his way to Kansas and the McDonald Shows. He worked as an advance advertising man as the troupe made its way to the West Coast, the Northwest and back to the Midwest. Harley briefly joined another show, before getting sick in Parsons, Kansas. His oldest brother Luther retrieved him and took him back to Texas.

Sadler recovered. At the entreaty of a minister who also offered a scholarship, he returned to school to study law at Reynolds Military Academy in Albany, Texas. When a repertory company passed through in 1912, Sadler went with it. During the following two years, he worked with several shows, including North Brothers Stock Company, the Renfro Jolly Pathfinders and the Wonderland Floating Theater, a Mississippi River showboat.

By now, Sadler had a clear idea of what he wanted from show business: to act and to be a comedian. He found a happy blending of the two in comedic acting roles.

His next stint was with Roy E. Fox's Popular Players. He was second comedian and played horn. He stayed with the company for several years, advancing to first comedian with its perk of top billing.

After a whirlwind courtship, Sadler married Willie Louise (Billie) Massengale of Cameron, Texas, in 1917. They met at the Cameron tax office where she was working when he applied for a permit for the show. Billie joined Harley on the Fox circuit, selling tickets and playing piano between acts. One performance she filled in for a leading lady who had fallen ill.

== The Brunk years ==
In the same year, Sadler was called up for military service, but rejected, due to poor health. He and Billie left Fox to join Brunk's Comedians. Brunk and Sadler performed as a comedy team until Brunk was drafted. Sadler assumed the managerial duties.

When Glen Brunk returned from war, he and Sadler entered a partnership under which Sadler would manage and they would both be equal partners in Brunk's Comedians No. 3. Sadler toured through Texas with the new show, finding great success as an independent manager. In 1920, he and Brunk disagreed on the number of units Brunk was sending on the road, so Sadler renamed his unit. In 1922, when his contract with the Brunks expired, Sadler bought out their interest and set out as the owner, manager and top comedian of Harley Sadler and His Own Company.

== Harley Sadler and His Own Company ==
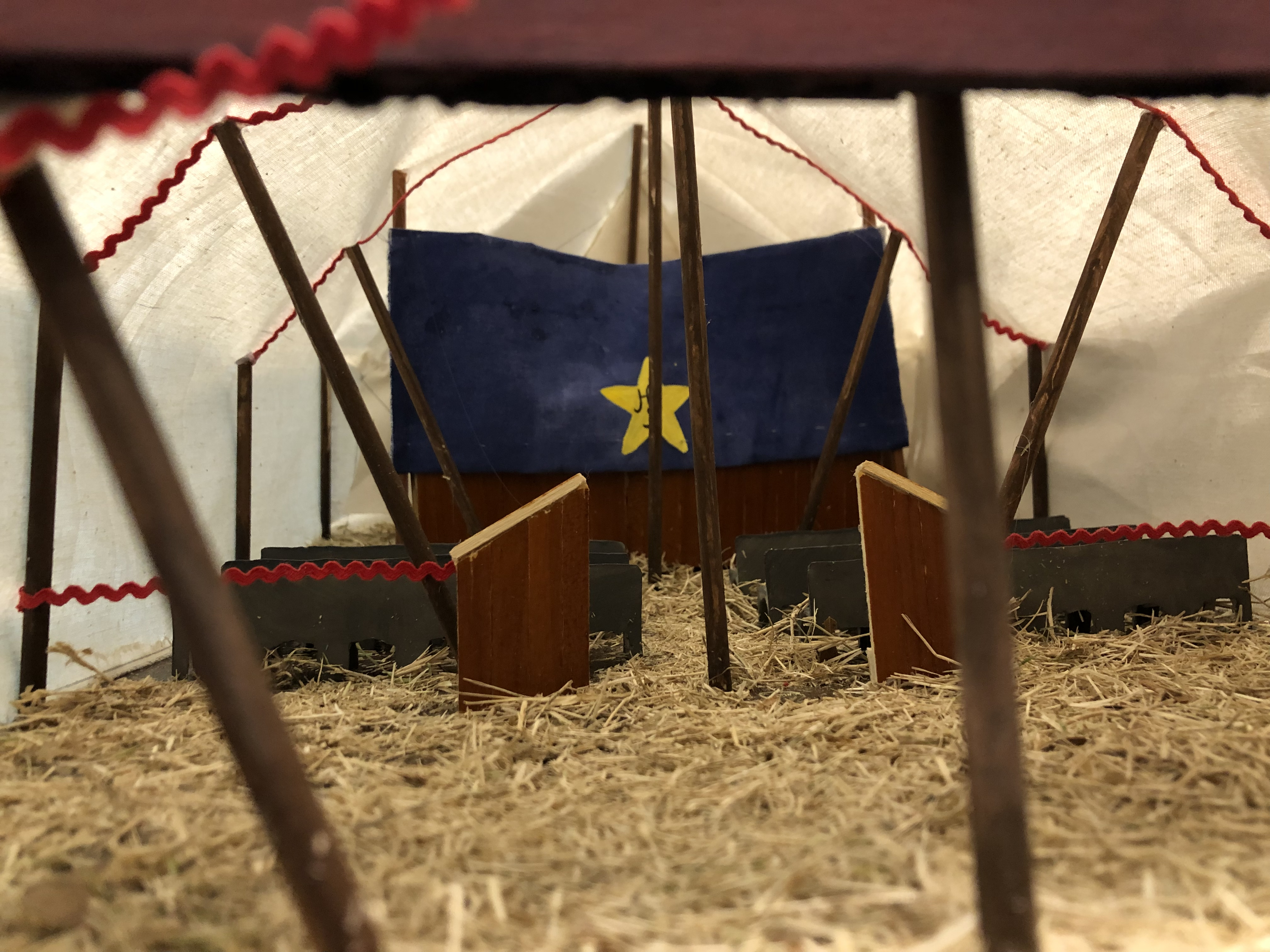
To-scale replica of one of Harley Sadler's tent interiors

The first few years, Harley, Billie and the troupe toured a vast territory: Kansas, Oklahoma, Colorado, New Mexico and Texas. Later on, they focused on West Texas and eastern New Mexico. Sadler's shows usually played the same towns at the same time every year, opening in spring in the Sadlers' hometown of Sweetwater and closing during Christmastime in San Angelo. He tried to hit cotton towns after harvest or during the fall fairs, a practice that proved lucrative. The company typically wintered in Waco, playing stock and preparing new repertory for the road. Depending on the town's size, the show might stay a week or two. During the depression, Sadler found it necessary to do two or three night stands and cover more territory.

According to a contemporaneous article in The New York Times, touring tent shows of the 1920s were "a more extensive business than Broadway and the rest of legitimate theater industry put together." Tent performances were produced in 16,000 communities annually, while Broadway-style shows reached only 300 cities.

Most tent shows, including Sadler's, were family affairs. Billie acted as business manager and played leading ladies, her mother Louise (Mama Lou) was backstage director (seamstress and dresser), while her brother Burnie was boss canvas man. Sadler's brother Ferd (short for Ferdinand) handled advance man duties; his wife Gladys ran the box office. The Sadlers' only child, Gloria, joined the troupe as soon as she could walk. Nephews, nieces and other family members worked the show during summer vacations.

The show stopped in 60-odd communities biennially. Sadler's gift for remembering faces, names and local events plus his empathic understanding of his audience endeared him to locals, onstage and off. He was noted for generosity with his money as well as his talent.

=== Characters ===
Many tent shows shared common characters. Toby, the most recognizable, was Sadler's signature character and, to West Texans, one he became inseparable from.

Toby was a genial freckle-faced, red-wigged rube in a loud shirt, patched overalls, oversized worn-out boots and floppy hat. Toby also lacked one front tooth. He was presented as a silly, naive, mischievous kid who was smarter than he looked. A common plot involved Toby, the hayseed, outwitting a city slicker. Homespun humor, slapstick, gymnastics and facial contortions were part of the persona.

The character had its origins in Tobe Haxton, the folk hero of the 1912 play Clouds and Sunshine, first performed at the Magic Theater in Fort Dodge, Iowa. "Proto-Tobies" go back to the comedies of Plautus.

Sputters was a stuttering cowboy version of Toby. He could only speak fluently while tracing an imaginary square in the air with his finger.

Like Toby, Sadler's old man character G. String was introduced in Clouds and Sunshine. He was usually portrayed as bald headed with a fringe of white hair and a white goatee, wore wire-rimmed spectacles and often carried a cane. He might depict a constable, station agent or retiree.

Typical melodrama characters, the villain and the hero, were also in Sadler's repertoire.

=== Scripts ===
Sadler's script choices tended toward comedic drama, melodrama and morality plays. Like the characters, many of these "rag opries" were common to numerous tent shows. Among his most popular offerings were Saintly Hypocrites and Honest Sinners, The Awakening of John Slater, Laugh That Off and the temperance play Ten Nights in a Barroom. During the 1930s, Harley Salder and His Own Company included a few Broadway hits: The Family Upstairs, Skidding and Tommy.

Plays changed seasonally, excluding Honest Sinners and Saintly Hypocrites, which remained on the bill by popular demand. There was a role for Toby in most of the productions. Scripts were selected for their adaptability to the local scene. Actors spoke the dialect of their audience.

Vaudeville routines, aka specialty acts, were staged during intermissions of three- or four-act plays. The lineup might include a tap or ballet dancer, ballad singer, juggler, ventriloquist, cowboy singer or harmonica player. Sadler's tiny daughter Gloria was particularly beloved for her tap numbers.

At the first intermission, Sadler, in his Toby costume, would don an usherette tray and stroll into the audience selling "bally" (for ballyhoo) candy, boxes of saltwater taffy. The candy was wildly popular, not so much for its flavor, but because certain packages had numbered coupons redeemable for prizes. These were purchased from local merchants to gain their good will and might include such items as small diamond rings, glassware, radios, rocking chairs, cake dishes or canning kettles.

=== A typical production ===
Preparations for a Harley Sadler show began days in advance. Shortly before the show date, brother Ferd would arrive to distribute advertising and locate a venue. In exchange for tickets, businesses along Main Street would put up posters in the front window. For 10% of gross ticket sales, organizations such as the Veterans of Foreign Wars, American Legion, Lions, Shriners or the volunteer fire department would happily provide the "three L's (lot, license and ‘lectricity)."

On "put up" days, Billie's brother Burnie led the crew erecting the large canvas tent; installing the marquee, stage, curtains and bleachers; constructing the ticket booth; and unloading chairs, costumes and scenery. While set up was underway, the actors and actresses would promenade through the town. Local citizens looked forward to the parade as a significant social event. For local women, the finely-dressed actresses were a sort of fashion show, especially during the hard times when they sewed their own clothes from printed flour or feed sack fabrics.

Late in the afternoon of opening night, Harley's uniformed all-male marching band would perform a concert in the town center. Sadler would present a ballyhoo, a clamorous attention-getting exhortation (and tent show tradition) to attract customers. Admission cost for the two-hour show was twenty-five cents for adults and fifteen cents for children.

In front of the large canvas tent, cast photos were displayed on freestanding placards. A small lobby held a popcorn machine and concession stand. Inside the tent, the stage floor stood at a height of five feet and was separated from the front row by a distance of six feet. If the bill included a major musical production, the space would accommodate the orchestra. The 30-foot wide proscenium was covered by a draped curtain with "Harley Sadler" spelled out in sequins across the bottom. The masks of comedy and tragedy were placed at the sides. During the company's peak in the late 1920s, the tent would hold as many as 2,000 spectators.

Sadler's repertoire was tailored to the unsophisticated taste of Texas and eastern New Mexico audiences, and featured relatable characters and situations. He presented a variety of plays. Many were contemporary dramas in which a man was redeemed by the love of a good woman after being debased by a bad one. For productions presenting vexing moral questions, a resolution, through simple virtues: charity, chastity, forgiveness and Christian love, was always found before the final curtain.

Before the play's last act, Harley would step in front of the curtain to talk to the audience, not as a stage character, but as himself. Sometimes, he would deliver a short sermon about loving, forgiving or lending a helping hand. At its conclusion, he would walk to the left edge of the stage, turn, smile, and recite the same lines after every show. "And so, at the end of the last act, I bid each and every one of you a fond good night."

Orchestra members would slip into their places as the last act drew to a close. After curtain calls, they would play a concluding number. Good Night, Sweetheart was one of Harley's favorites. If the show was the first of two performances, a brisk march was played to hasten the audience's departure.

Sadler never performed in competition with church services. Ten percent of ticket sales always went to a church or civic group in the host town. He insisted his performances be entertaining, but also wholesome and inoffensive. "Never in one of my shows has there been or shall there ever be a word, a song or an inflection to cause a lady to blush."

== 1930s-early 1940s ==
The show prospered until the Great Depression. In 1931, still buoyed on a tide of prosperity, Sadler bought a new tent with seating for 2,500 and expanded the company to more than 50 players. Unfortunately, his audience could no longer afford tickets.

Two financial disasters followed: Sadler's attempt at managing a circus and his staging of The Siege of the Alamo, a pageant for the Texas Centennial. At the same time, Sadler's tent caught fire and burned. He owned creditors $25,000, then a substantial debt. To avoid declaring bankruptcy, he sold his remaining properties, made good on what bills he could and handed out IOUs for the rest.

The Sadlers sold their Sweetwater house and moved into a trailer. Letters soon arrived from across the country stuffed with contributions, anywhere from $1 to $1,000, all begging Sadler to get the show back on the road. He rented a dollar-a-day tent, formed a company of 12 and headed for West Texas and a series of one-night stands. Within two years, he paid off the debt.

In the early 1940s, tent show attendance fell off as air-conditioned movie theaters and drive-ins grew in popularity. Sadler briefly turned his attention to the oil fields as a wildcatter. Like most independent oil operators, it was a feast or famine proposition. He continued to tour with a much smaller tent show until the 1941 death of his daughter. He sold all of his equipment with the intention of retiring. However, he remained intermittently active until a 1947 farewell tour with circus boss Joe McKennon.

== Notable troupers ==
Sadler's troupers had no formal acting training, but some artists who toured with the company went on to notable careers.

Actor/singer Chill Wills began his rise to fame in Sadler's tent shows, as did character actors Will Geer, Dick Elliott, Milburn Stone, Charles Winninger and leading man Lyle Talbot. Country musician Slim Andrews and B-Western film star and singer Monte Hale also traveled with the show.

Jennifer Jones appeared on the bill in the late 1930s. A famous photograph shows the exterior of Sadler's tent and a truck with Jones' name emblazoned on the side.

He reportedly fired Clark Gable in the 1920s for exhibiting stage fright.

== Politics ==
In 1940, Sadler served as campaign manager and sometime-emcee at campaign stops for his cousin Jerry Sadler's run for Texas governor. The following year, he entered state politics himself, entering the race as a Democrat for Texas House of Representatives. He won the Sweetwater District seat, which represented Fisher, Mitchell and Nolan counties.

An Austin American-Statesman reporter wrote, "There has never been a milder, more sincere sort of man in the Legislature than Harley Sadler."

He served three terms in the Texas House. Pressed to run for the U.S. House or governorship of Texas, he instead campaigned for the Texas Senate, and lost. In 1950, he moved to Abilene and, once again, ran a successful race for a House seat, this time representing Taylor County. Years later, Sadler ran unopposed for Texas Senate. In this role, he represented the counties of Taylor, Borden, Dickens, Fisher, Garza, Howard, Jones, Kent, Mitchell, Nolan, Scurry, Shackelford and Stonewall.

== Personal life ==
Sadler was plagued with poor health all his life. During his political career, it took a turn for the worse, exacerbated by his inability to say "no." He would readily agree to help any civic group asking for a favor, whether emceeing a benefit or working nonstop in other capacities. His daughter's death continued to take a toll. He left flowers on her grave twice a week.

He suffered a heart attack while emceeing a Boy Scout fundraiser in Avoca, Texas. He died the next morning, October 15, 1954. Nine months later, after a cancer diagnosis, Billie took her own life. He is interred next to her and Gloria in the Massengale plot in Cameron.
