= List of tornadoes in the outbreak of May 20–23, 2019 =

From May 20–23, 2019, a large and devastating tornado outbreak affected most of the Central United States.

== Confirmed tornadoes ==
Daily statistics
| Date | Total | EFU | EF0 | EF1 | EF2 | EF3 | EF4 | EF5 | Deaths | Injuries |
|---|---|---|---|---|---|---|---|---|---|---|
| May 20 | 39 | 16 | 10 | 9 | 3 | 1 | 0 | 0 | 0 | 1 |
| May 21 | 31 | 4 | 10 | 14 | 2 | 1 | 0 | 0 | 0 | 1 |
| May 22 | 32 | 7 | 8 | 12 | 2 | 3 | 0 | 0 | 5 | 35 |
| May 23 | 8 | 2 | 6 | 0 | 0 | 0 | 0 | 0 | 0 | 0 |
| Total | 114 | 29 | 34 | 39 | 7 | 5 | 0 | 0 | 5 | 37 |
Notes = Note that "EFU" implies unknown category. Eight tornadoes are currently not listed here.

=== May 20 event ===
List of confirmed tornadoes – Monday, May 20, 2019 (Note: All dates are based on the local time zone where the tornado touched down; however, all times are in Coordinated Universal Time for consistency.)
| EF# | Location | County / Parish | State | Start Coord. | Time (UTC) | Path length | Max width |
|---|---|---|---|---|---|---|---|
| EF0 | SSW of Moenave | Coconino | AZ | 36.05°N 111.35°W | 16:50 | 1 mi (1.6 km) | 10 yd (9.1 m) |
| EF0 | A brief tornado remained over open country, causing no damage. | | | | | | |
| EFU | S of McAdoo | Dickens | TX | 33.6648°N 101.0009°W | 19:05–19:18 | 1 mi (1.6 km) | 30 yd (27 m) |
| EFU | A storm chaser and an off-duty NWS employee reported a tornado over open land. No known damage occurred. | | | | | | |
| EFU | W of Paducah (1st tornado) | Cottle | TX | 33.9973°N 100.3859°W | 20:00–20:01 | 0.2 mi (0.32 km) | 10 yd (9.1 m) |
| EFU | An emergency manager videoed a tornado. | | | | | | |
| EF0 | W of Paducah (2nd tornado) | Cottle | TX | 34.025°N 100.3733°W | 20:01–20:09 | 1.89 mi (3.04 km) | 20 yd (18 m) |
| EF0 | An emergency manager videoed a tornado. | | | | | | |
| EF0 | SW of Wellington | Collingsworth | TX | 34.7864°N 100.2851°W | 20:29–20:30 | 0.35 mi (0.56 km) | 50 yd (46 m) |
| EF0 | Small tree limbs were broken by this weak tornado. | | | | | | |
| EFU | NW of Cashion | Kingfisher | OK | 35.8614°N 97.7557°W | 20:31–20:32 | 0.5 mi (0.80 km) | 40 yd (37 m) |
| EFU | Storm chasers witnessed a tornado. No damage was reported. | | | | | | |
| EFU | N of Cashion (1st tornado) | Kingfisher | OK | 35.897°N 97.716°W | 20:43–20:47 | 3.7 mi (6.0 km) | 150 yd (140 m) |
| EFU | Television storm chasers and helicopters observed a tornado. No known damage occurred. | | | | | | |
| EFU | N of Cashion (2nd tornado) | Kingfisher | OK | 35.9592°N 97.68°W | 20:46–20:47 | 0.5 mi (0.80 km) | 50 yd (46 m) |
| EFU | A second tornado was observed in conjunction with the previous one. No damage was reported. | | | | | | |
| EF1 | NW of Crescent | Logan | OK | 35.953°N 97.656°W | 20:50–20:58 | 6 mi (9.7 km) | 70 yd (64 m) |
| EF1 | The roof was blown off a barn. | | | | | | |
| EFU | N of Crescent | Logan | OK | 35.987°N 97.617°W | 20:54–20:55 | 1 mi (1.6 km) | 40 yd (37 m) |
| EFU | A tornado was reported via broadcast media. No known damage occurred. | | | | | | |
| EF1 | NW of Mulhall | Logan | OK | 36.116°N 97.497°W | 21:08 | 0.3 mi (0.48 km) | 40 yd (37 m) |
| EF1 | Two power poles and trees were damaged. A truck was pushed into a ditch. | | | | | | |
| EF1 | S of Chicopee | Cherokee, Crawford | KS | 37.3325°N 94.7516°W | 21:14–21:19 | 2.19 mi (3.52 km) | 440 yd (400 m) |
| EF1 | Numerous trees were damaged or snapped, and outbuildings were damaged or destroyed. | | | | | | |
| EF1 | W of Perry | Noble | OK | 36.253°N 97.385°W | 21:23–21:27 | 3 mi (4.8 km) | 100 yd (91 m) |
| EF1 | Barns and a home were damaged. | | | | | | |
| EF1 | S of Pittsburg, KS to SE of Mindenmines, MO | Crawford (KS), Barton (MO) | KS, MO | 37.3524°N 94.7074°W | 21:23–21:38 | 10.67 mi (17.17 km) | 1,200 yd (1,100 m) |
| EF1 | Outbuildings, grain bins, carports, and barns were damaged or destroyed, and homes sustained roof damage as a result of this large tornado. Many trees were snapped or uprooted, and a mobile home was overturned as well. | | | | | | |
| EF0 | NNE of Dover (1st tornado) | Kingfisher | OK | 36.038°N 97.886°W | 21:36 | 0.1 mi (0.16 km) | 20 yd (18 m) |
| EF0 | A television storm chaser sighted a tornado. No damage was reported. | | | | | | |
| EFU | SW of Hollis | Harmon | OK | 34.6593°N 99.9573°W | 21:37–21:38 | 0.5 mi (0.80 km) | 50 yd (46 m) |
| EFU | Multiple storm chasers observed a tornado. No known damage occurred. | | | | | | |
| EF0 | NNE of Dover (2nd tornado) | Kingfisher | OK | 36.041°N 97.885°W | 21:38 | 0.1 mi (0.16 km) | 20 yd (18 m) |
| EF0 | A television storm chaser observed a tornado. No known damage occurred. | | | | | | |
| EFU | ENE of Hollis | Harmon | OK | 34.7066°N 99.8712°W | 21:45 | 0.3 mi (0.48 km) | 30 yd (27 m) |
| EFU | An off-duty NWS employee observed a tornado. No known damage occurred. | | | | | | |
| EF0 | E of Hennessey | Kingfisher, Logan | OK | 36.123°N 97.69°W | 21:55–21:59 | 1.45 mi (2.33 km) | 20 yd (18 m) |
| EF0 | A storm chaser observed a tornado. No known damage occurred. | | | | | | |
| EFU | NNE of Gould | Harmon | OK | 34.6967°N 99.7565°W | 21:59 | 0.1 mi (0.16 km) | 20 yd (18 m) |
| EFU | Multiple storm chasers reported a tornado. No known damage occurred. | | | | | | |
| EF1 | SW of Perry | Garfield, Noble | OK | 36.19°N 97.495°W | 22:05–22:13 | 7.7 mi (12.4 km) | 100 yd (91 m) |
| EF1 | A house and a barn were severely damaged. | | | | | | |
| EF0 | WSW of Orlando | Logan | OK | 36.1279°N 97.4462°W | 22:09 | 0.3 mi (0.48 km) | 50 yd (46 m) |
| EF0 | Some trees were damaged. | | | | | | |
| EF2 | Western Mangum | Greer | OK | 34.809°N 99.614°W | 22:12–22:29 | 11 mi (18 km) | 1,200 yd (1,100 m) |
| EF2 | A strong and highly visible tornado impacted areas around Mangum, destroying many outbuildings, ripping the roof off a home, and damaging trees. The tornado weakened as entered the western part of Mangum, damaging the roof of an apartment building before dissipating. Research radar data indicates the tornado was likely stronger than EF2 over rural areas. | | | | | | |
| EF3 | SE of Odessa | Ector, Midland | TX | 31.7333°N 102.3041°W | 22:23–22:38 | 5.8 mi (9.3 km) | 225 yd (206 m) |
| EF3 | Power poles were broken, and some pump jacks were toppled along with other oil field equipment. Extensive ground scouring occurred as this intense tornado moved across open oil fields. | | | | | | |
| EFU | SW of Granite | Greer | OK | 34.9498°N 99.3925°W | 22:38 | 0.2 mi (0.32 km) | 40 yd (37 m) |
| EFU | Multiple storm chasers reported a brief tornado. No known damage occurred. | | | | | | |
| EFU | NE of Sumner | Noble | OK | 36.393°N 97.052°W | 22:38 | 0.2 mi (0.32 km) | 30 yd (27 m) |
| EFU | A storm chaser sighted a brief tornado. No damage was reported. | | | | | | |
| EF0 | NE of Fort Myers | Lee | FL | 26.6681°N 81.8214°W | 22:48–22:50 | 0.06 mi (0.097 km) | 30 yd (27 m) |
| EF0 | A tornado damaged a mobile home before dissipating and reforming as a waterspout over the Caloosahatchee River. | | | | | | |
| EFU | NNE of Lone Wolf | Kiowa | OK | 35.0435°N 99.223°W | 23:14–23:15 | 0.5 mi (0.80 km) | 30 yd (27 m) |
| EFU | Multiple storm chasers observed a tornado. No damage was reported. | | | | | | |
| EFU | WSW of Dudenville | Jasper | MO | 37.2942°N 94.1016°W | 23:45–23:46 | 0.24 mi (0.39 km) | 50 yd (46 m) |
| EFU | A tornado in an open field was caught on video. No known damage occurred. | | | | | | |
| EFU | E of Dickens | Dickens | TX | 33.6049°N 100.5951°W | 23:47–23:54 | 3.37 mi (5.42 km) | 300 yd (270 m) |
| EFU | Numerous storm chasers observed a large, rain-wrapped tornado that reportedly downed trees. | | | | | | |
| EF2 | SE of Midland | Midland | TX | 31.6953°N 101.9734°W | 23:52–00:02 | 6.63 mi (10.67 km) | 150 yd (140 m) |
| EF2 | Two RV campers and a two mobile homes were destroyed, and power poles were snapped. | | | | | | |
| EF0 | Eastern Tulsa | Tulsa | OK | 36.1543°N 95.8549°W | 02:05–02:06 | 0.5 mi (0.80 km) | 100 yd (91 m) |
| EF0 | Large tree limbs were snapped and power poles were downed. | | | | | | |
| EFU | S of Rotan | Fisher | TX | 32.77°N 100.5°W | 02:08 | 0.01 mi (0.016 km) | 30 yd (27 m) |
| EFU | A trained storm spotter reported a brief tornado. | | | | | | |
| EF1 | E of Winchester | Okmulgee | OK | 35.7940°N 95.8454°W | 03:01–03:11 | 4.4 mi (7.1 km) | 450 yd (410 m) |
| EF1 | A home was damaged and an outbuilding was destroyed. Trees and power poles were also downed. | | | | | | |
| EF0 | SW of Wagoner | Wagoner | OK | 35.9365°N 95.4118°W | 03:09–03:10 | 0.75 mi (1.21 km) | 75 yd (69 m) |
| EF0 | Several trees were uprooted and large tree limbs snapped. | | | | | | |
| EFU | E of Sagerton | Haskell | TX | 33.08°N 99.95°W | 03:29 | 0.01 mi (0.016 km) | 30 yd (27 m) |
| EFU | A trained storm spotter reported a brief tornado. | | | | | | |
| EF2 | SW of Peggs to NW of Kansas | Cherokee, Delaware | OK | 36.0526°N 95.1535°W | 03:29–03:56 | 21 mi (34 km) | 2,700 yd (2,500 m) |
| EF2 | A strong, massive wedge tornado struck the town of Peggs, where a general store was damaged, storage buildings were destroyed, a manufactured home was damaged, and a brick home sustained total roof loss and some collapse of exterior walls. Elsewhere along the path, chicken houses and manufactured homes were damaged, outbuildings were destroyed, and numerous trees and power poles were snapped. One person was injured. | | | | | | |
| EF1 | S of Salina | Mayes | OK | 36.2675°N 95.1491°W | 03:35–03:43 | 3.6 mi (5.8 km) | 1,100 yd (1,000 m) |
| EF1 | Power poles were snapped and trees were uprooted. | | | | | | |
| EF1 | W of Leach to NW of Kansas | Delaware | OK | 36.2036°N 94.9533°W | 03:54–04:04 | 6.9 mi (11.1 km) | 600 yd (550 m) |
| EF1 | Homes and outbuildings were damaged, and trees were snapped or uprooted. This tornado crossed the damage path of the EF2 tornado that struck Peggs. | | | | | | |

=== May 21 event ===
List of confirmed tornadoes – Tuesday, May 21, 2019
| EF# | Location | County / Parish | State | Start Coord. | Time (UTC) | Path length | Max width |
|---|---|---|---|---|---|---|---|
| EF1 | Northeastern Noble | McClain, Cleveland | OK | 35.109°N 97.447°W | 08:45–08:50 | 3.75 mi (6.04 km) | 250 yd (230 m) |
| EF1 | Trees and barns were damaged in the northeastern part of Noble. | | | | | | |
| EF1 | NE of Norman | Cleveland | OK | 35.218°N 97.361°W | 08:57–09:08 | 4.1 mi (6.6 km) | 50 yd (46 m) |
| EF1 | Several trees were damaged. | | | | | | |
| EF0 | SSE of Lake Stanley Draper | Cleveland | OK | 35.277°N 97.318°W | 09:13 | 0.3 mi (0.48 km) | 20 yd (18 m) |
| EF0 | A brief tornado damaged trees and the roof of a barn. | | | | | | |
| EF1 | NW of Stella | Cleveland | OK | 35.358°N 97.25°W | 09:22–09:24 | 1.4 mi (2.3 km) | 30 yd (27 m) |
| EF1 | An outbuilding and several trees were damaged. | | | | | | |
| EF2 | E of Dale | Pottawatomie | OK | 35.387°N 97.028°W | 09:33–09:42 | 2.6 mi (4.2 km) | 150 yd (140 m) |
| EF2 | A mobile home was destroyed, several others were damaged, and some tree trunks were snapped. | | | | | | |
| EF0 | ENE of Aydelotte to ESE of Meeker | Pottawatomie, Lincoln | OK | 35.463°N 96.856°W | 09:50–09:55 | 2.3 mi (3.7 km) | 30 yd (27 m) |
| EF0 | Two outbuildings and a few trees were damaged. | | | | | | |
| EF1 | NW of Sapulpa | Creek | OK | 36.0231°N 96.1655°W | 11:08–11:11 | 1.6 mi (2.6 km) | 75 yd (69 m) |
| EF1 | A tornado developed just south of Sahoma Lake and quickly traversed it. A debris ball signature was apparent on radar during the event; however, survey teams were unable to access these areas due to flooding. The tornado's path and intensity are based on radar data. | | | | | | |
| EFU | SW of McBride | Marshall | OK | 33.8991°N 96.6893°W | 11:25 | 0.5 mi (0.80 km) | 20 yd (18 m) |
| EFU | Emergency management reported a waterspout over Lake Texoma that remained over water and caused no damage. | | | | | | |
| EF0 | Northern Tulsa | Tulsa | OK | 36.1708°N 95.9739°W | 11:29–11:30 | 0.4 mi (0.64 km) | 75 yd (69 m) |
| EF0 | Radar data depicted a debris ball over an industrial area of Tulsa; however, survey teams were unable to fully survey the affected area due to flooding. The intensity estimation was based on radar data as result. | | | | | | |
| EF1 | Tulsa | Tulsa | OK | 36.1742°N 95.9725°W | 11:31–11:35 | 2.3 mi (3.7 km) | 550 yd (500 m) |
| EF1 | A number of homes and structures were damaged, trees were downed, and two power poles were snapped. One man was injured when a tree fell onto his house. | | | | | | |
| EF1 | N of Tulsa | Tulsa | OK | 36.2334°N 95.9153°W | 11:37–11:39 | 0.7 mi (1.1 km) | 75 yd (69 m) |
| EF1 | Trees were damaged near the Tulsa International Airport. | | | | | | |
| EF0 | NNE of Owasso | Tulsa | OK | 36.3156°N 95.8231°W | 11:48–11:49 | 0.6 mi (0.97 km) | 100 yd (91 m) |
| EF0 | Large tree branches were snapped. | | | | | | |
| EF1 | W of Tushka | Atoka | OK | 34.335°N 96.345°W | 12:03–12:06 | 1.6 mi (2.6 km) | 100 yd (91 m) |
| EF1 | A barn suffered significant roof damage. Trees and power lines were downed. | | | | | | |
| EF0 | WSW of Bassville | Greene | MO | 37.3199°N 93.1985°W | 18:06–18:07 | 1.17 mi (1.88 km) | 100 yd (91 m) |
| EF0 | An outbuilding was blown off its foundation, a barn had its roof blown off, and some homes sustained minor shingle damage. Several trees were also uprooted. | | | | | | |
| EF1 | W of Marshfield | Webster | MO | 37.2722°N 93.0549°W | 19:48–19:55 | 7.07 mi (11.38 km) | 100 yd (91 m) |
| EF1 | A tornado along an intermittent path damaged the roofs of structures and snapped or uprooted trees. | | | | | | |
| EF1 | W of Mansfield to W of Manes | Wright | MO | 37.0797°N 92.6268°W | 20:17–20:40 | 23.75 mi (38.22 km) | 200 yd (180 m) |
| EF1 | A grocery store in Hartville had its storefront collapsed and the back of the store blown in. Several trees were snapped and uprooted, with some falling onto a home. | | | | | | |
| EF1 | E of Beulah to ESE of Edgar Springs | Phelps | MO | 37.627°N 91.8774°W | 21:18–21:28 | 5.87 mi (9.45 km) | 800 yd (730 m) |
| EF1 | Hundreds of trees were snapped. | | | | | | |
| EF1 | SSE of Enterprise to S of Chapman | Dickinson | KS | 38.8433°N 97.1004°W | 21:32–21:48 | 7.48 mi (12.04 km) | 100 yd (91 m) |
| EF1 | Trees and power lines were damaged. | | | | | | |
| EF0 | W of Stockton | Rooks | KS | 39.4386°N 99.5123°W | 21:50–21:51 | 0.23 mi (0.37 km) | 50 yd (46 m) |
| EF0 | Photographic evidence confirmed a tornado. | | | | | | |
| EFU | E of Chapman to ENE of Milford | Dickinson, Geary | KS | 38.9794°N 96.9923°W | 21:52–22:23 | 17.69 mi (28.47 km) | 150 yd (140 m) |
| EFU | This tornado was intermittent in nature and stayed over rural areas, producing no observable damage. | | | | | | |
| EF1 | E of Yucatan | Callaway | MO | 38.8542°N 91.728°W | 22:05–22:08 | 0.56 mi (0.90 km) | 250 yd (230 m) |
| EF1 | A small barn was destroyed, and some trees were damaged. | | | | | | |
| EF1 | W of Labadie to NE of Augusta | Franklin, St. Charles | MO | 38.5319°N 90.8934°W | 22:58–23:10 | 5.94 mi (9.56 km) | 250 yd (230 m) |
| EF1 | A few roofs were blown off barns and outbuildings, and some homes sustained minor structural damage. Extensive tree damage also occurred. | | | | | | |
| EF0 | E of Rossville to SW of Mayetta | Shawnee, Jackson | KS | 39.1318°N 95.9140°W | 23:10–23:32 | 12.56 mi (20.21 km) | 50 yd (46 m) |
| EF0 | Trees and power lines were damaged. | | | | | | |
| EF2 | SW of Mayetta to S of Whiting | Jackson | KS | 39.3281°N 95.7311°W | 23:38–00:00 | 17.13 mi (27.57 km) | 75 yd (69 m) |
| EF2 | Several structures and trees sustained moderate damage in the western part of Mayetta. Outside of town, outbuildings were damaged, and a house lost much of its roof and part of an exterior wall. | | | | | | |
| EF0 | Waterloo | Monroe | IL | 38.3638°N 90.1609°W | 00:01–00:02 | 0.34 mi (0.55 km) | 50 yd (46 m) |
| EF0 | Minor structural and tree damage occurred on the northern side of Waterloo. | | | | | | |
| EF0 | SW of Oneida | Nemaha | KS | 39.8185°N 95.9758°W | 00:06–00:13 | 3.05 mi (4.91 km) | 50 yd (46 m) |
| EF0 | Outbuildings and one residence were damaged. | | | | | | |
| EF1 | NW of Effingham | Atchison | KS | 39.5411°N 95.4228°W | 00:08–00:17 | 5.39 mi (8.67 km) | 30 yd (27 m) |
| EF1 | Several power poles were snapped. | | | | | | |
| EF3 | E of Bern | Nemaha | KS | 39.9243°N 95.9335°W | 00:20–00:28 | 5.9 mi (9.5 km) | 300 yd (270 m) |
| EF3 | This low-end EF3 tornado caused severe damage to a well-built brick home. Trees and power lines were also damaged, and cycloidal scouring occurred in open farm fields. | | | | | | |
| EFU | S of Dawson (1st tornado) | Richardson | NE | 40.0589°N 95.8285°W | 00:31–00:32 | 0.03 mi (0.048 km) | 50 yd (46 m) |
| EFU | A storm chaser caught a tornado on video. No known damage occurred. | | | | | | |
| EFU | S of Dawson (2nd tornado) | Richardson | NE | 40.0656°N 95.8283°W | 00:43–00:45 | 1.68 mi (2.70 km) | 50 yd (46 m) |
| EFU | Storm chasers and a sheriff deputy sighted a tornado over open fields. No known damage occurred. | | | | | | |
| EF0 | SE of Howe | Nemaha | NE | 40.2649°N 95.7739°W | 00:55–00:56 | 0.8 mi (1.3 km) | 50 yd (46 m) |
| EF0 | Tree limbs were downed by this brief, weak tornado. | | | | | | |

=== May 22 event ===
List of confirmed tornadoes – Wednesday, May 22, 2019
| EF# | Location | County / Parish | State | Start Coord. | Time (UTC) | Path length | Max width |
|---|---|---|---|---|---|---|---|
| EF1 | SE of Anita | Cass | IA | 41.4087°N 94.7524°W | 06:04–06:06 | 1.09 mi (1.75 km) | 50 yd (46 m) |
| EF1 | An old barn was demolished and its remains were tossed up to 0.3 mi (0.48 km) away. | | | | | | |
| EF2 | E of Adair | Adair, Guthrie | IA | 41.4557°N 94.6249°W | 06:29–06:37 | 4.75 mi (7.64 km) | 150 yd (140 m) |
| EF2 | 1 death - A split-level home was severely damaged, sustaining roof and exterior wall loss. One person inside was killed, and another was injured. Outbuildings were damaged or destroyed, and a few other homes sustained some damage. | | | | | | |
| EF0 | WNW of Pahrump | Nye | NV | 36.232°N 116.0175°W | 19:30–19:35 | 0.16 mi (0.26 km) | 25 yd (23 m) |
| EF0 | A landspout tornado caused no damage over an open field. | | | | | | |
| EF1 | N of Cromwell | Seminole | OK | 35.358°N 96.462°W | 21:29–21:31 | 1 mi (1.6 km) | 50 yd (46 m) |
| EF1 | An outbuilding sustained roof damage, and trees were snapped. | | | | | | |
| EFU | SSW of Castle | Okfuskee | OK | 35.4113°N 96.4046°W | 21:34–21:35 | 0.5 mi (0.80 km) | 100 yd (91 m) |
| EFU | Trained storm spotters reported a tornado over an inaccessible area. No known damage occurred. | | | | | | |
| EFU | S of Castle | Okfuskee | OK | 35.4538°N 96.3853°W | 21:41–21:43 | 1 mi (1.6 km) | 50 yd (46 m) |
| EFU | Storm chasers sighted a tornado. No known damage occurred. | | | | | | |
| EF1 | SE of IXL | Okfuskee | OK | 35.4935°N 96.3606°W | 21:47–21:49 | 0.8 mi (1.3 km) | 75 yd (69 m) |
| EF1 | A brief tornado destroyed several outbuildings and snapped tree limbs. | | | | | | |
| EF1 | Okfuskee | Okfuskee | OK | 35.6066°N 96.2292°W | 22:10–22:12 | 0.6 mi (0.97 km) | 125 yd (114 m) |
| EF1 | A brief tornado moderately damaged some farmsteads and lofted hay bales. | | | | | | |
| EF1 | E of Okemah | Okfuskee | OK | 35.4313°N 96.2168°W | 22:23–22:33 | 6 mi (9.7 km) | 650 yd (590 m) |
| EF1 | A tornado formed just north of I-40 and damaged homes, snapped trees, and destroyed outbuildings. | | | | | | |
| EF1 | ENE of Okemah | Okfuskee, Okmulgee | OK | 35.4903°N 96.1605°W | 22:32–22:50 | 7.7 mi (12.4 km) | 400 yd (370 m) |
| EF1 | A tornado damaged outbuildings and snapped numerous trees. | | | | | | |
| EF0 | NW of Morris | Okmulgee | OK | 35.6237°N 95.8869°W | 23:03 | 0.2 mi (0.32 km) | 75 yd (69 m) |
| EF0 | Large tree limbs were snapped. | | | | | | |
| EF0 | NNE of Turley | Tulsa | OK | 36.2923°N 95.9378°W | 23:07 | 0.2 mi (0.32 km) | 75 yd (69 m) |
| EF0 | Large tree limbs were snapped. | | | | | | |
| EF0 | NE of Haskell | Muskogee | OK | 35.8343°N 95.6553°W | 23:36 | 0.2 mi (0.32 km) | 75 yd (69 m) |
| EF0 | Large tree limbs were snapped. | | | | | | |
| EF1 | W of Bluejacket | Craig | OK | 36.7813°N 95.2521°W | 23:44–23:53 | 5.1 mi (8.2 km) | 350 yd (320 m) |
| EF1 | A tornado snapped or uprooted numerous trees. | | | | | | |
| EF1 | SW of Welch | Craig | OK | 36.832°N 95.1399°W | 23:59–00:01 | 1.5 mi (2.4 km) | 150 yd (140 m) |
| EF1 | Power poles were snapped and trees were uprooted. | | | | | | |
| EFU | SE of Fair Oaks | Wagoner, Rogers | OK | 36.1563°N 95.6889°W | 00:25–00:27 | 1.8 mi (2.9 km) | 75 yd (69 m) |
| EFU | A trained storm spotter reported a tornado that caused no damage. | | | | | | |
| EF1 | WNW of Cardin, OK, to Treece, KS | Ottawa (OK), Cherokee (KS) | OK, KS | 36.9535°N 94.9301°W | 00:25–00:36 | 7.32 mi (11.78 km) | 1,100 yd (1,000 m) |
| EF1 | A tornado damaged homes, destroyed outbuildings, snapped power poles, and snapped or uprooted numerous trees. | | | | | | |
| EF3 | N of Galena, KS to Carl Junction, MO to W of Oronogo, MO | Cherokee (KS), Jasper (MO) | KS, MO | 37.1096°N 94.6244°W | 01:05–01:19 | 9.22 mi (14.84 km) | 440 yd (400 m) |
| EF3 | This strong tornado crossed over the Kansas-Missouri state line shortly after it touched down, and moved directly through Carl Junction, with the most severe damage occurring in the Briarbrook Country Club area. Dozens of well-built homes in town were heavily damaged, a few of which sustained loss of roofs and exterior walls. Numerous other homes sustained light to moderate roof damage. Outbuildings outside of town were destroyed, several power poles were snapped or damaged, numerous trees were snapped, and several cars at a salvage yard were tossed. This tornado struck areas just a few miles north of Joplin on the eighth anniversary of a catastrophic EF5 tornado that killed 158 people. | | | | | | |
| EF1 | NE of Pryor | Mayes | OK | 36.3138°N 95.3108°W | 01:09–01:19 | 3.1 mi (5.0 km) | 650 yd (590 m) |
| EF1 | A tornado damaged outbuildings and uprooted trees. | | | | | | |
| EF1 | NE of Sutter | Hancock | IL | 40.3319°N 91.3222°W | 01:17–01:18 | 0.53 mi (0.85 km) | 30 yd (27 m) |
| EF1 | A barn was completely destroyed, a power pole was snapped, and a large tree was uprooted. | | | | | | |
| EF0 | N of Armstrong | Howard | MO | 39.2897°N 92.6979°W | 01:19–01:22 | 0.56 mi (0.90 km) | 40 yd (37 m) |
| EF0 | The walls and doors of an outbuilding were collapsed. | | | | | | |
| EF0 | NE of Oronogo | Jasper | MO | 37.1976°N 94.4632°W | 01:23–01:35 | 7.88 mi (12.68 km) | 200 yd (180 m) |
| EF0 | Numerous large trees were snapped. | | | | | | |
| EFU | W of Hominy (1st tornado) | Osage | OK | 36.42°N 96.5205°W | 01:28 | 0.2 mi (0.32 km) | 100 yd (91 m) |
| EFU | Trained storm spotters sighted a brief tornado over open country. No known damage occurred. | | | | | | |
| EFU | W of Hominy (2nd tornado) | Osage | OK | 36.42°N 96.4481°W | 01:31 | 0.2 mi (0.32 km) | 75 yd (69 m) |
| EFU | Trained storm spotters sighted a brief tornado over open country. No known damage occurred. | | | | | | |
| EFU | NW of Locust Grove | Mayes | OK | 36.2358°N 95.2144°W | 01:44 | 0.2 mi (0.32 km) | 100 yd (91 m) |
| EFU | Trained storm spotters reported a brief tornado. No known damage occurred. | | | | | | |
| EF3 | SE of Jasper to N of Golden City | Jasper, Barton | MO | 37.308°N 94.2343°W | 01:51–02:13 | 11.29 mi (18.17 km) | 880 yd (800 m) |
| EF3 | 3 deaths – See section on this tornado – One person was injured. | | | | | | |
| EF1 | S of Salina | Mayes | OK | 36.2661°N 95.1683°W | 01:52–02:02 | 5.3 mi (8.5 km) | 400 yd (370 m) |
| EF1 | A large cone tornado snapped or uprooted numerous trees. | | | | | | |
| EF2 | Western Jay to E of Grove | Delaware (OK), McDonald (MO) | OK, MO | 36.4307°N 94.8135°W | 02:34–03:08 | 16.59 mi (26.70 km) | 1,100 yd (1,000 m) |
| EF2 | This strong tornado touched down at the west edge of Jay before clipping the north side of town, where multiple homes sustained severe damage. Two frame homes had their roofs torn off, and two mobile homes were completely destroyed. Several other homes sustained lesser damage, outbuildings were damaged and destroyed, and many trees were snapped or uprooted along the path. The tornado dissipated shortly after crossing into Missouri. | | | | | | |
| EF0 | E of Rushville | Schuyler | IL | 40.1273°N 90.4811°W | 02:56–02:59 | 1.75 mi (2.82 km) | 50 yd (46 m) |
| EF0 | A storm chaser photographed a tornado over an open field. No known damage occurred. | | | | | | |
| EF0 | WNW Rush Hill to S of Santa Fe | Audrain | MO | 39.2588°N 91.8296°W | 03:02–03:03 | 0.83 mi (1.34 km) | 150 yd (140 m) |
| EF0 | A barn sustained extensive damage, and several trees were also damaged. | | | | | | |
| EF3 | Eldon to Jefferson City | Miller, Cole, Callaway | MO | 38.3344°N 92.6132°W | 03:56–04:45 | 32.68 mi (52.59 km) | 1,500 yd (1,400 m) |
| EF3 | 1 death – See section on this tornado – 33 people were injured. | | | | | | |

=== May 23 event ===
List of confirmed tornadoes – Thursday, May 23, 2019
| EF# | Location | County / Parish | State | Start Coord. | Time (UTC) | Path length | Max width |
|---|---|---|---|---|---|---|---|
| EF1 | SW of Cantrall to W of Broadwell | Sangamon, Menard, Logan | IL | 39.9199°N 89.6909°W | 05:15–05:27 | 15.25 mi (24.54 km) | 150 yd (140 m) |
| EF1 | A fast-moving tornado snapped or uprooted numerous trees, damaged farmsteads, and destroyed multiple outbuildings. | | | | | | |
| EF1 | N of Lincoln | Logan | IL | 40.1719°N 89.3926°W | 05:33–05:37 | 2.7 mi (4.3 km) | 100 yd (91 m) |
| EF1 | A brief tornado damaged several outbuildings, one home, and snapped trees. | | | | | | |
| EF0 | SE of Vinta | Craig | OK | 36.6091°N 95.099°W | 05:39–05:40 | 0.5 mi (0.80 km) | 150 yd (140 m) |
| EF0 | Large tree limbs were snapped, and power poles were toppled. | | | | | | |
| EF1 | N of Ketchum | Craig, Delaware | OK | 36.5938°N 95.0387°W | 05:48–06:00 | 8.6 mi (13.8 km) | 1,100 yd (1,000 m) |
| EF1 | A large tornado snapped or uprooted numerous trees, destroyed outbuildings, and damaged a mobile home. | | | | | | |
| EF1 | Northern Cisco | Piatt | IL | 40.0116°N 88.7367°W | 06:10–06:12 | 1.34 mi (2.16 km) | 200 yd (180 m) |
| EF1 | Numerous trees were damaged in the northern part of Cisco, several of which fell on structures. | | | | | | |
| EF1 | S of Laquey | Laclede, Pulaski | MO | 37.7132°N 92.435°W | 06:49–07:10 | 11.05 mi (17.78 km) | 440 yd (400 m) |
| EF1 | Mobile homes were overturned and numerous trees were damaged. A house sustained minor roof damage as well. | | | | | | |
| EF1 | Muncie | Vermilion | IL | 40.1133°N 87.8552°W | 07:06–07:08 | 1.56 mi (2.51 km) | 200 yd (180 m) |
| EF1 | A brief tornado snapped multiple power poles and downed trees in town. One home was damaged by a tree that fell on it. A semi-trailer was overturned on I-74. | | | | | | |
| EF0 | WSW of Xenia | Clay | IL | 38.6161°N 88.693°W | 13:15–13:16 | 0.73 mi (1.17 km) | 20 yd (18 m) |
| EF0 | A brief tornado occurred over open fields. | | | | | | |

== See also ==
- Tornadoes of 2019
- List of United States tornadoes in May 2019
