= Dickens County Courthouse and Jail =

- U.S. National Register of Historic Places
- Texas State Antiquities Landmark
- Recorded Texas Historic Landmark
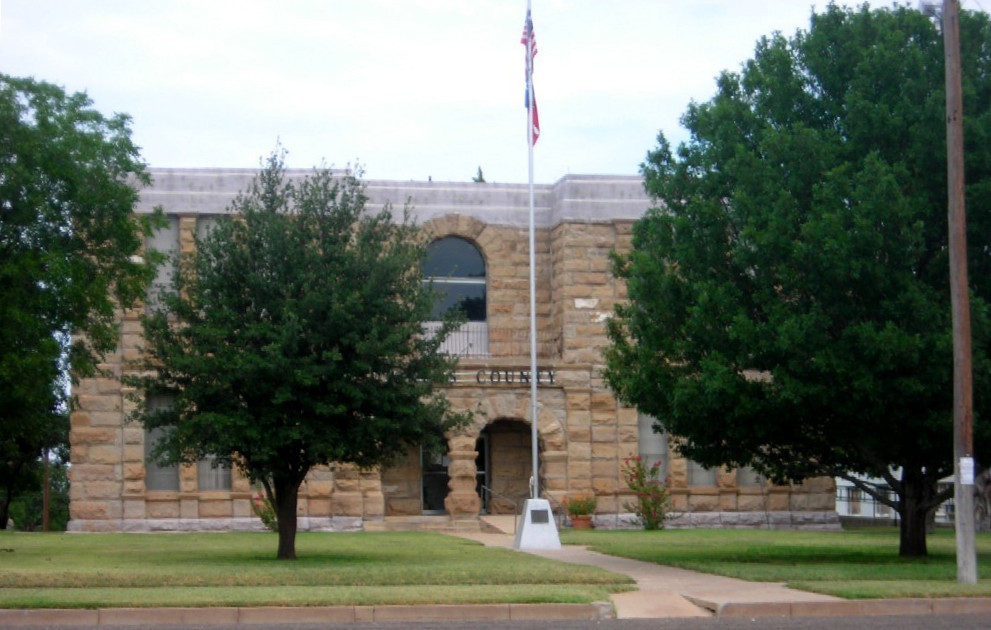
- Dickens County Courthouse in 2009

- Location within Texas Location within the United States
- Location: Public Sq., Dickens, Texas
- Coordinates: 33°37′16″N 100°50′10″W
- Area: 0.2 acres (0.081 ha)
- Built: 1892-1893 (courthouse), 1909 (jail)
- Built by: E.L. Aiken, Southern Structural Steel Co.
- NRHP reference No.: 80004098
- TSAL No.: 8200000222
- RTHL No.: 1220

Significant dates
- Added to NRHP: September 4, 1980
- Designated TSAL: January 1, 1981
- Designated RTHL: 1962

The Dickens County Courthouse and Jail, on Public Sq. in Dickens, Texas, was built in 1892. It was listed on the National Register of Historic Places in 1980.

It is a Texas State Antiquities Landmark and a Recorded Texas Historic Landmark.

It formerly had a polygonal central tower with a domed cupola.

== See also ==
- National Register of Historic Places listings in Dickens County, Texas
- Recorded Texas Historic Landmarks in Dickens County
- List of county courthouses in Texas
