= Tornado outbreak of May 20–23, 2019 =

Weather event in the United States

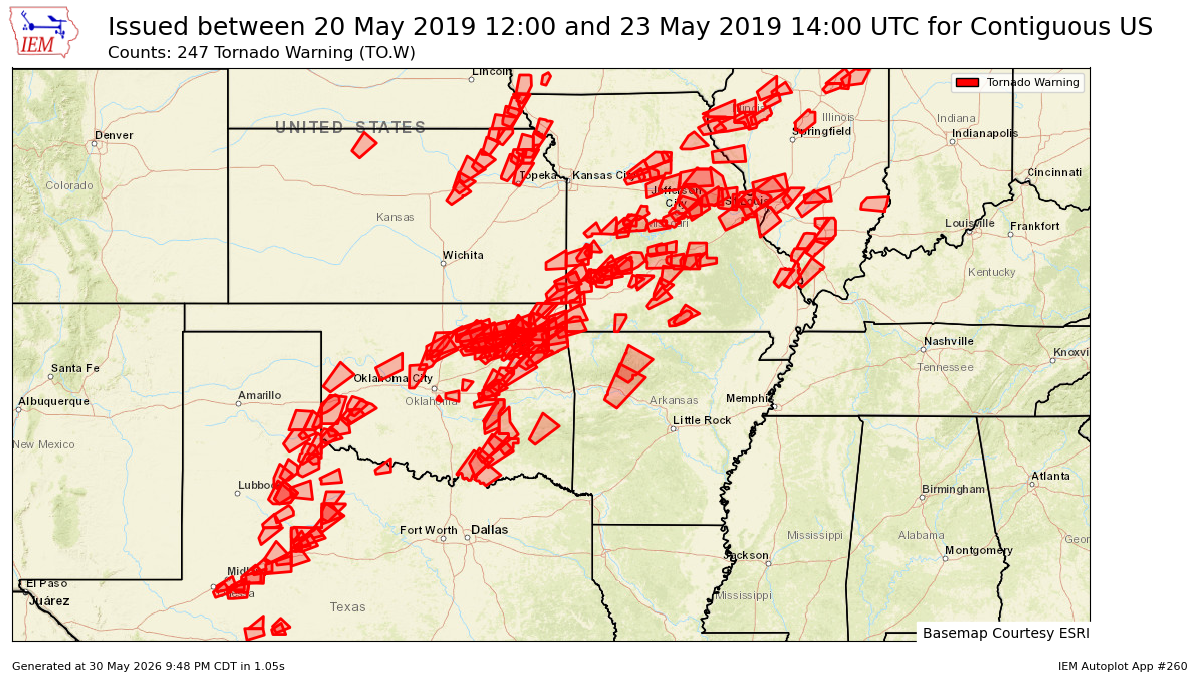
- Map of tornado warnings from the outbreak from May 20–23

Meteorological history
- Duration: May 20–23, 2019

Tornado outbreak
- Tornadoes: 114
- Max. rating: EF3 tornado
- Duration: 3 days, 20 hours, 26 minutes
- Highest winds: Tornadic – 160 mph (260 km/h) (Jefferson City, Missouri EF3 on May 22)
- Highest gusts: Non-tornadic – 94 mph (151 km/h) near Marshall, Oklahoma on May 20
- Largest hail: 5.50 in (14.0 cm) in Wellington, Texas on May 20

Overall effects
- Fatalities: 4 (+5 non-tornadic)
- Injuries: 37
- Damage: >$174 million (2019 USD)
- Areas affected: Great Plains, Midwestern United States, Eastern United States
- Part of the Tornadoes of 2019

From May 20–23, 2019, a significant and deadly tornado outbreak took place across the Central Plains. Coming just days after a previous outbreak in the same general regions, approximately 114 tornadoes touched down over the course of the outbreak. On May 20, the Storm Prediction Center (SPC) issued a high risk for portions of Oklahoma in what was anticipated to be a major outbreak with violent, long-tracked tornadoes; however conditions were less favorable then expected, and only moderate activity occurred. In the early morning hours of May 22, an EF2 tornado severely damaged a house near Adair, Iowa, killing one person and injuring another. Later that evening, an EF3 tornado caused severe damage in Carl Junction, Missouri, while another EF3 tornado destroyed homes near Golden City, killing three people and injuring one. Just before midnight, an EF3 tornado damaged or destroyed many homes and businesses in Jefferson City, killing one person and injuring 32 others.

Four people were killed due to the outbreak, while five died as a result of flooding caused by torrential rains from this system. 37 people were injured, while total damage costs were believed to be in excess of $174 million.

== Meteorological synopsis ==
=== May 20 ===
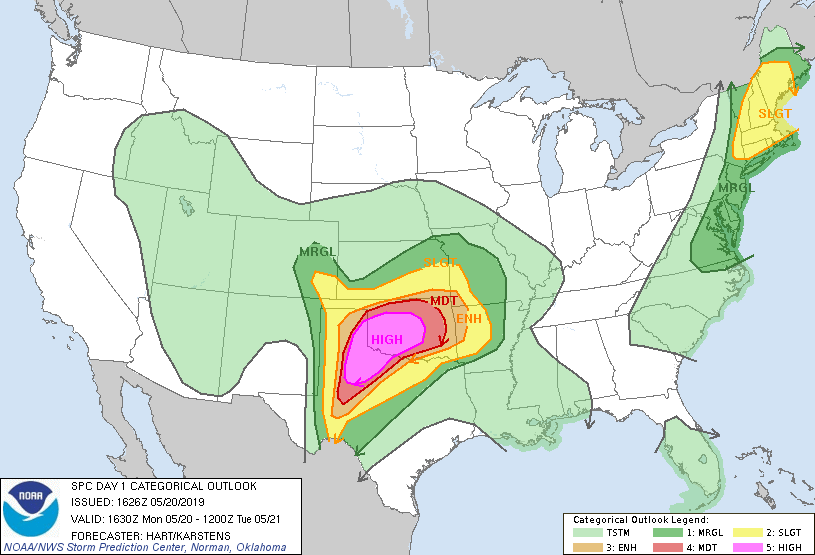
The Storm Prediction Center's day 1 convective outlook at 1630 UTC, featuring a high risk.

On the morning of May 20, 2019, the Storm Prediction Center in Norman, Oklahoma, issued a high risk for severe weather across western and central Oklahoma and northwest Texas. Characterized by extreme instability and low-level shear, along with a wind profile supporting the development of numerous widely spaced discrete supercell thunderstorms, conditions in place across this region were remarkably favorable for a large outbreak of violent, long-tracked tornadoes. As a precaution, many public school districts, private schools and colleges (including the University of Oklahoma) throughout Oklahoma announced during the afternoon and evening of May 19 that they would cancel all classes and extracurricular activities for the following day, if not hold classes during the morning only. Ironically, in response to the deaths of seven students at Plaza Towers Elementary School in Moore after an EF5 tornado hit that school and nearby Briarwood Elementary six years earlier on May 20, 2013, several of the public primary and secondary schools that canceled classes had since installed underground storm shelters for student and faculty use in the event that a tornado approached during school time. The El Reno, Oklahoma school district—which has storm shelters at seven of its schools (six underground and one above-ground shelter)—was one of the few in sections of central and western Oklahoma under highest threat of significant severe weather that decided to hold regular classes that day; El Reno Superintendent Craig McVay defended the decision on safety grounds, acknowledging that between 75% and 90% of students in the district do not have shelters in their home. Businesses, churches and other venues also decided to cancel events and activities, while some city-government offices (including in Oklahoma City) and Tinker Air Force Base instituted liberal leave policies to allow employees to arrive home prior to the onset of severe thunderstorm activity. By midday, the SPC increased the risk of significant tornadoes in northern portions of the Texas Panhandle, southwestern and central Oklahoma (including the Oklahoma City metropolitan area) from 30% to 45%.

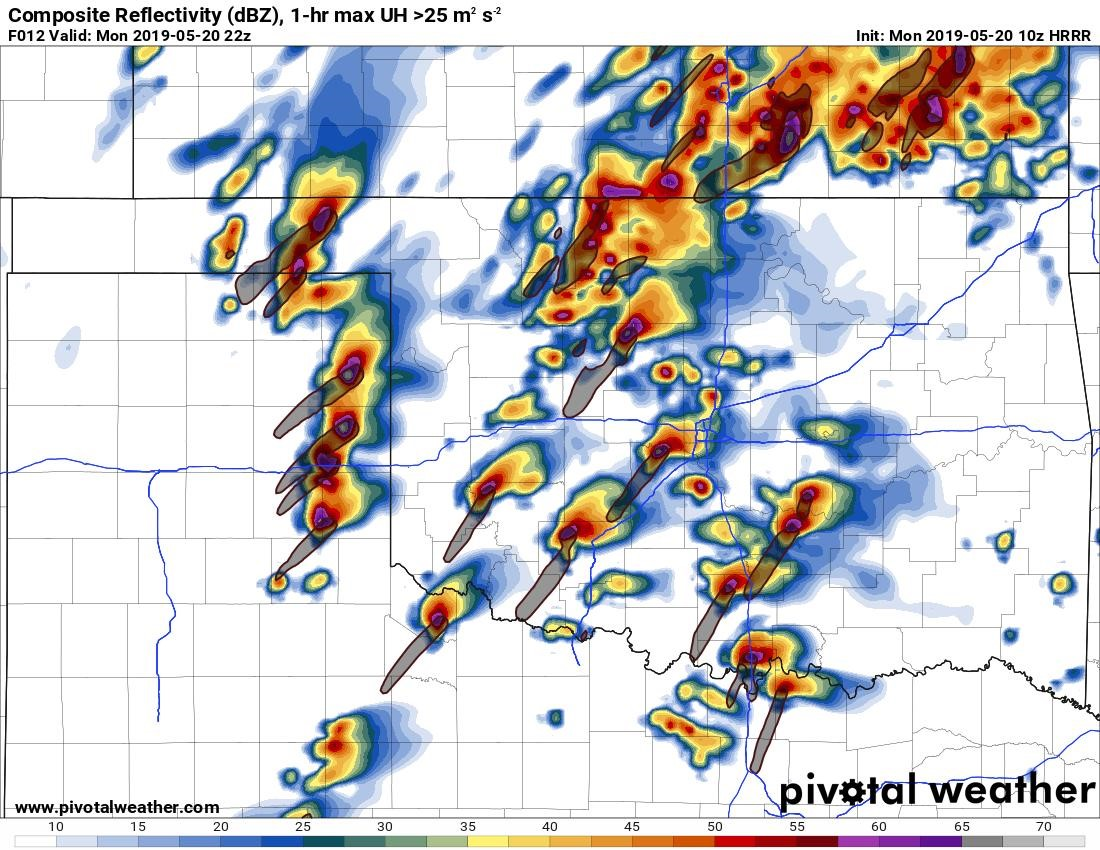
HRRR model run for 22Z on May 20

The Storm Prediction Center issued a Particularly Dangerous Situation Tornado Watch (the 197th severe weather watch issued in 2019) at 1:35 p.m. CDT for portions of the eastern Texas Panhandle and the Texas High Plains. A second PDS Tornado Watch (watch #199) was issued at 2:45 p.m. CDT for much of Oklahoma and western portions of north Texas, indicating >95% probabilities for all severe hazards (including probabilities of at least two tornadoes and one or more strong tornadoes [rated EF2 or higher], ten or more cases of straight-line thunderstorm winds of at least 58 mph [93 km/h] and at least one case of winds of at least 75 mph [121 km/h], and ten or more cases of hail of at least one inch [2.5 cm] in diameter and at least one case of hail larger than two inches [5.1 cm] in diameter); this was the second PDS watch with such high probabilities of significant severe weather to be issued by the SPC, after one issued for much of Alabama and portions of southeast Mississippi, southern middle Tennessee and northwest Georgia during the historic Super Outbreak of April 27, 2011.

Despite the extremely volatile and dangerous setup, the large outbreak of violent tornadoes that was expected did not occur. The most likely reason that the outbreak did not reach its potential is because the upper-level jet was displaced from the warm sector. As a result, this limited the necessary forcing needed for storms to initiate in greater coverage. The positioning of the upper jet can also influence warm air advection at the mid-levels (850–700 mb [25–21 inHg]) that can lead to stronger capping. Finally, expansive cloud cover also likely limited the day time heating necessary for the cap to break. These ingredients all together likely caused the missed forecast.

However, several strong tornadoes did touch down in Oklahoma and Texas during the afternoon and early evening. A large EF2 tornado damaged homes, destroyed outbuildings, and damaged the roof of an apartment building in Mangum, Oklahoma. In Texas, another EF2 tornado destroyed mobile homes and RV campers near Midland. An EF3 tornado touched down outside of the nearby city of Odessa, destroying oil pump jacks and leaving behind a swath of ground scouring as it moved through open oil fields. A large EF2 wedge tornado also struck the town of Peggs, Oklahoma, significantly damaging homes and businesses, and injuring one person. A total of 39 tornadoes were confirmed.

=== May 21 ===
On May 21, the Storm Prediction Center issued an enhanced risk for parts of Illinois, Missouri, and Arkansas, along with a slight risk for parts of Kansas and Oklahoma. A 10% risk area for tornadoes was in place over The Ozarks. Dozens of tornadoes occurred throughout the day, including an EF1 tornado that touched down in Tulsa, Oklahoma, damaging homes and trees, and injuring one person. An EF2 tornado occurred near Dale, Oklahoma, destroying a mobile home, while another EF2 tornado caused considerable damage in and around the town of Mayetta, Kansas. The strongest tornado of the day was an EF3 tornado that heavily damaged a brick home near Bern, Kansas, and left cycloidal scouring marks in open farm fields. A total of 31 tornadoes were confirmed on May 21. This day, severe weather resulted in a fatal car crash, which killed two people, as well as the drowning of another driver in Perkins, Oklahoma. A baseball game between the Saint Louis Cardinals and Kansas City Royals was postponed due to the severe weather.

=== May 22 ===
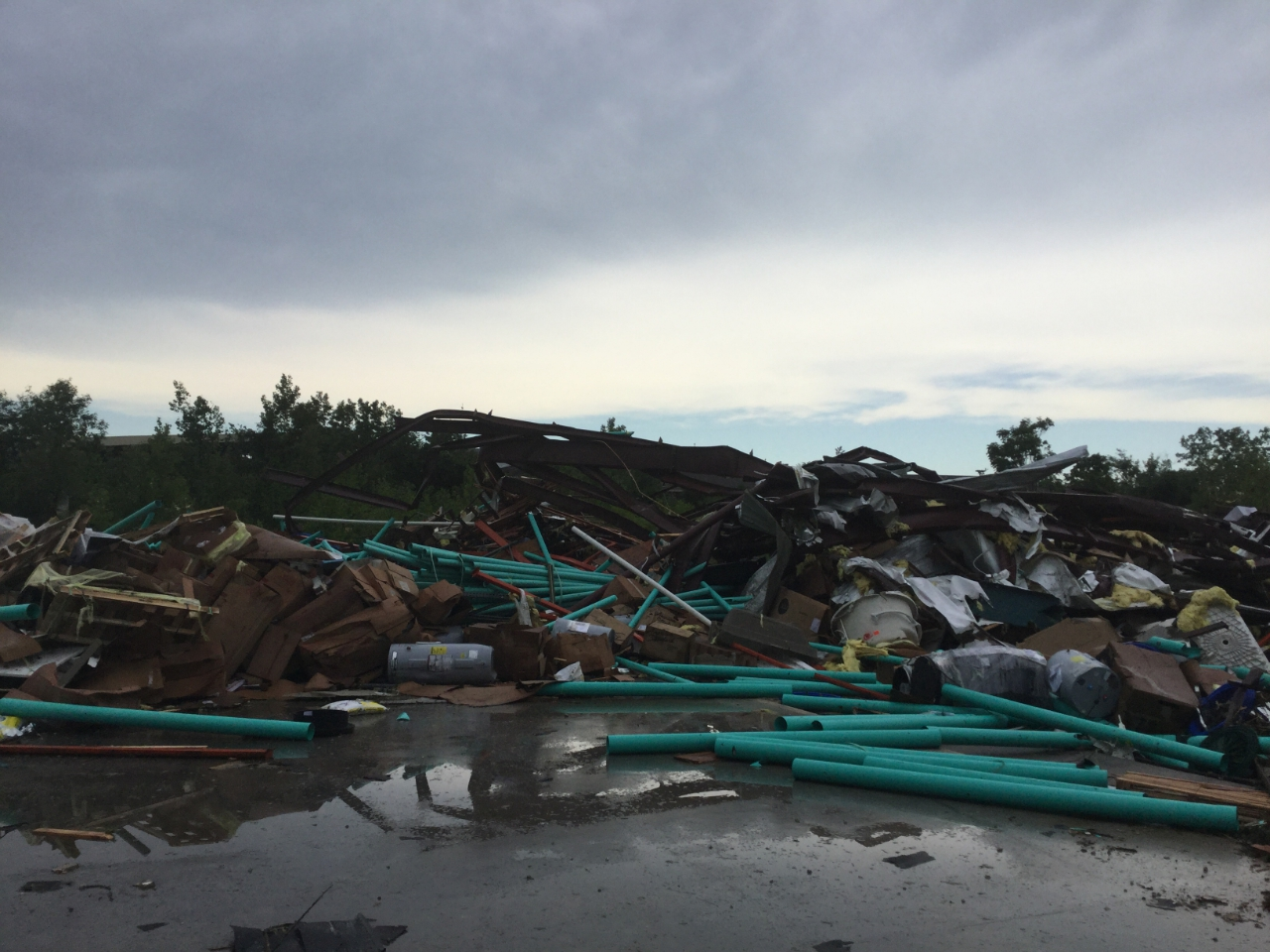
High-end EF3 damage to an industrial building in Jefferson City, Missouri.

The outbreak on this day had been poorly forecasted. The initial risk issued by the Storm Prediction Center on May 20 was only marginal while also being well west from where the severe weather event took place. The next day the outlook was expanded and upgraded with a small slight risk, but that was issued in Eastern Kansas and Western Missouri and the main outbreak region was only in the marginal risk. On May 22, however, the risk area was shifted southeastward and an enhanced risk was added for northeast Oklahoma northeastward through southeastern Kansas into western Missouri. At 16:30 UTC, the enhanced risk was expanded and a moderate risk for severe weather was issued for those same regions, including a 15% hatched risk for tornadoes. The potential for strong tornadoes existed from Oklahoma City, Oklahoma, to Columbia, Missouri. Before the main outbreak took place, an early-morning EF2 tornado struck near Adair, Iowa, with one fatality and an injury occurring at a home that sustained major structural damage. By 4:30 PM CDT, three Tornado Watches, stretching from north-central Texas to northwest and west-central Illinois were in effect, with two of them classified as PDS watches. That evening, an EF3 tornado struck the town of Carl Junction, Missouri, causing major damage to homes. This tornado occurred just north of where the EF5 Joplin tornado had occurred exactly eight years prior. The same parent supercell thunderstorm later produced the deadliest tornado of the outbreak sequence; a multiple-vortex EF3 tornado that destroyed several homes and killed three people near Golden City, Missouri. An EF2 tornado also caused significant damage in the town of Jay, Oklahoma. The most destructive tornado of the night was a high-end EF3 tornado that tore directly through Jefferson City, Missouri, where numerous homes, apartments, and businesses were heavily damaged or destroyed. At least 34 people were injured in Jefferson City, including one man who succumbed to his injuries a few days later. Overall, a total of 31 tornadoes were confirmed on this day.

== Confirmed tornadoes ==
Confirmed tornadoes by Enhanced Fujita rating
EFU	EF0	EF1	EF2	EF3	EF4	EF5	Total
27	30	45	7	5	0	0	114

=== Jasper–Golden City, Missouri ===
Jasper–Golden City, Missouri
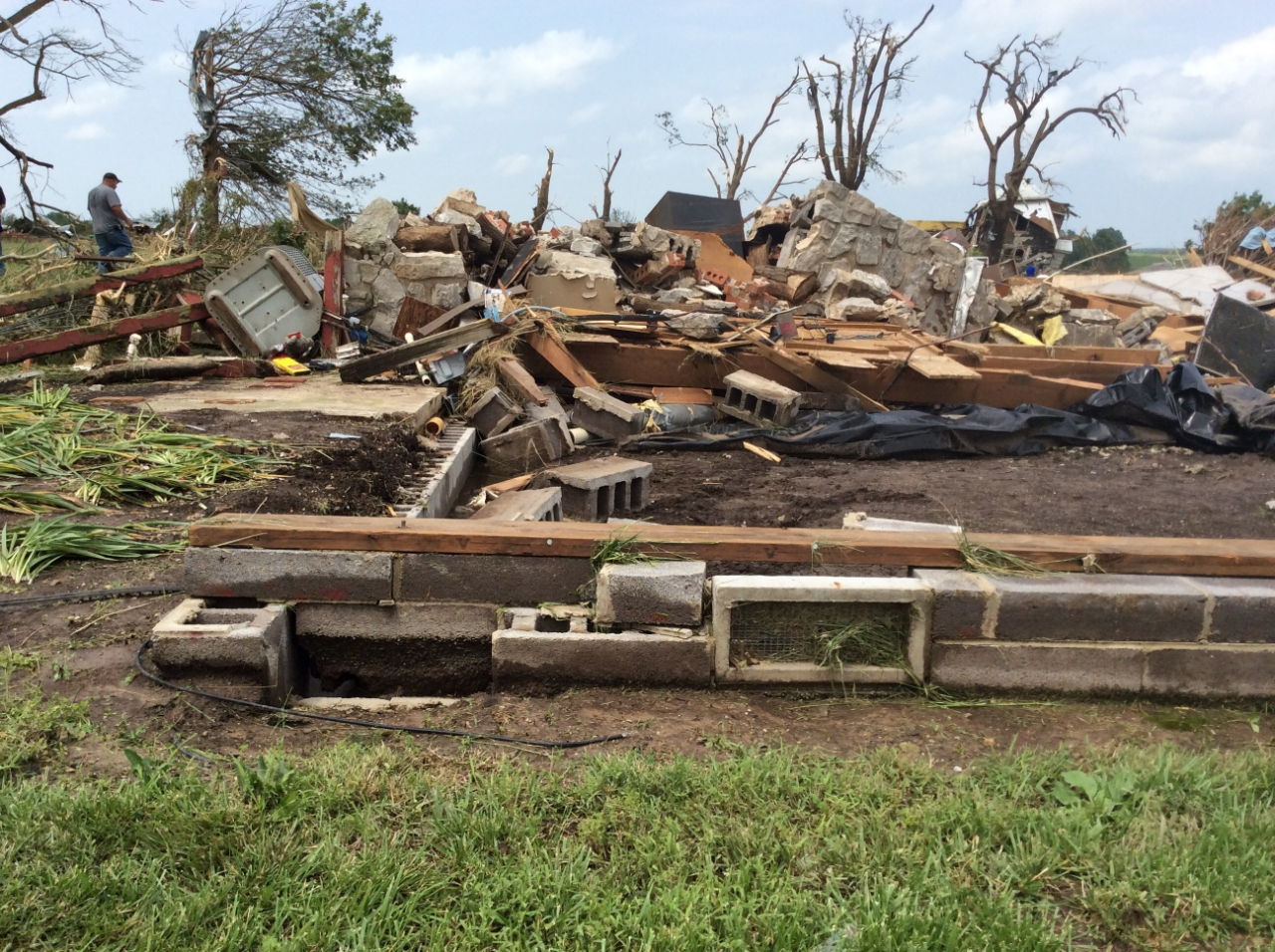
- EF3 damage to a block-foundation farmhouse near Golden City, Missouri. Two of the three fatalities from this tornado occurred at this location.

Meteorological history
- Formed: May 22, 2019, 8:51 p.m. CDT (UTC–05:00)
- Dissipated: May 22, 2019, 9:13 p.m. CDT (UTC–05:00)
- Duration: 22 minutes

EF3 tornado
- on the Enhanced Fujita scale
- Highest winds: 140 mph (230 km/h)

Overall effects
- Fatalities: 3
- Injuries: 1
- Damage: $740,000 (2019 USD)

The deadliest tornado of the outbreak sequence began five miles to the southeast of Jasper, Missouri, during the evening of May 22. The large and powerful multiple-vortex tornado touched down along Redbud Road, immediately reaching EF2 strength. Large wooden transmission line supports were snapped and a house had its roof torn off. A garage in this area also sustained roof damage. The tornado then crossed Sumac Road, inflicting significant damage to some homes and outbuildings in this area, and scattering debris across roads. The tornado then weakened to EF1 strength as it approached and crossed the Barton County line. Numerous trees and power poles were downed, a house sustained shingle damage, and a barn had its sheet metal roofing peeled off in this area. Continuing to the northeast, the large tornado rapidly re-intensified and reached EF3 strength as it passed to the west of Golden City. As the tornado moved across SE 80th Lane, three homes were badly damaged or destroyed. Two people were killed as a block-foundation farmhouse was completely leveled with debris strewn long distances through nearby fields. Another home sustained roof loss and failure of exterior walls. A metal equipment shed was mangled and destroyed, and large trees in this area were snapped and denuded. Maintaining EF3 intensity, the tornado then crossed the intersection of Route 126 and SE 90th Lane, where a brick home sustained roof and exterior wall loss, and a mobile home was obliterated and swept away, resulting in another fatality. In addition, large trees were snapped and a few other homes sustained roof, window, and siding damage. Beyond this point, the tornado began to weaken rapidly as it moved to the north of Golden City. A final area of EF0 tree limb damage was observed along E County Road U before the tornado dissipated. In addition to the 3 fatalities, one other person was injured by this tornado, which was rated EF3.

=== Eldon–Jefferson City, Missouri ===
Eldon–Jefferson City, Missouri
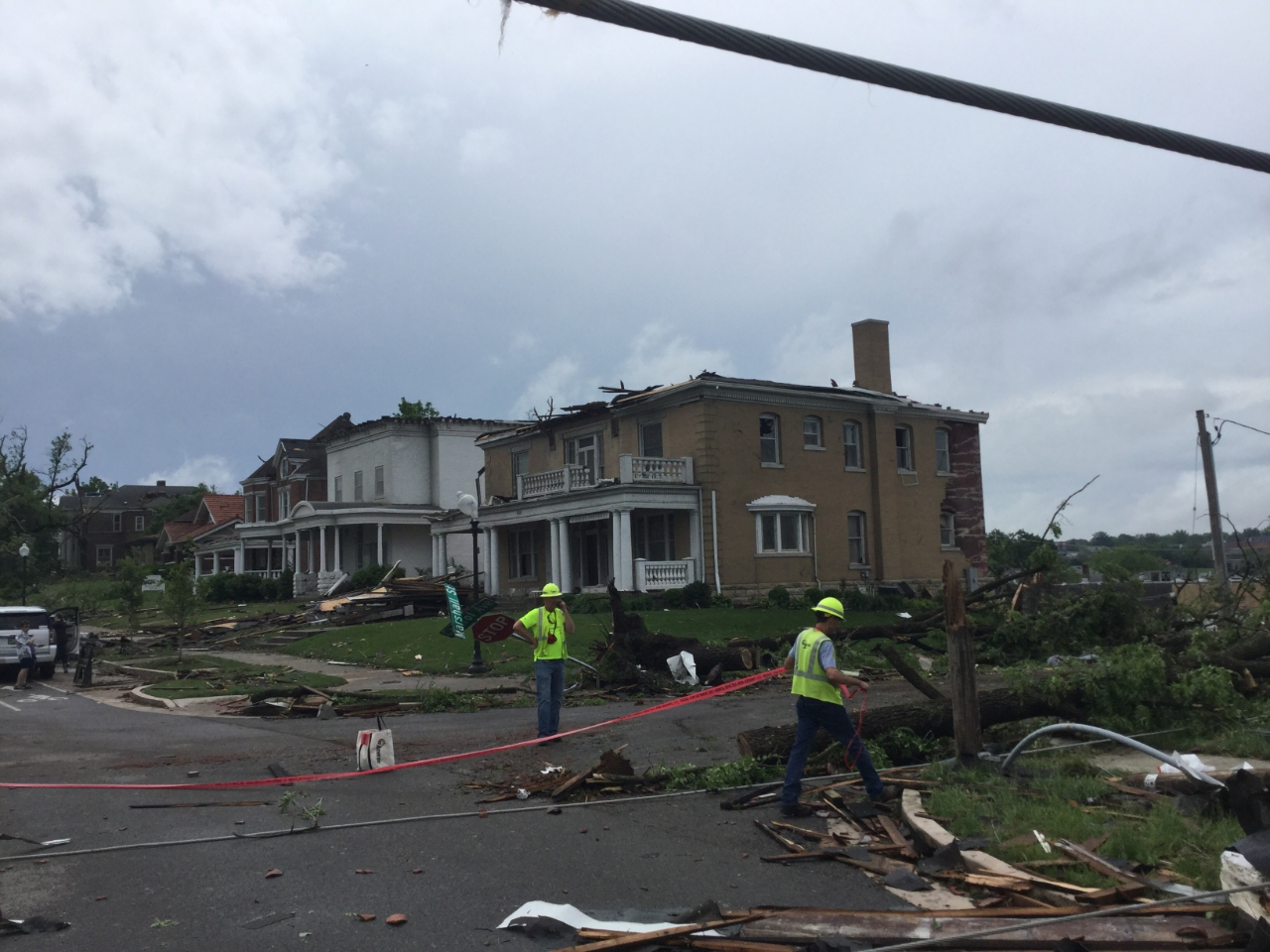
- Heavy damage to historic brick homes in Jefferson City, Missouri.

Meteorological history
- Formed: May 22, 2019, 10:56 p.m. CDT (UTC–05:00)
- Dissipated: May 22, 2019, 11:51 p.m. CDT (UTC–05:00)
- Duration: 55 minutes

EF3 tornado
- on the Enhanced Fujita scale
- Highest winds: 160 mph (260 km/h)

Overall effects
- Fatalities: 1
- Injuries: 33
- Damage: $174 million (2019 USD)

This strong and destructive nighttime EF3 tornado first touched down west of Eldon, Missouri, snapping tree limbs near Foote Lane Road at EF0 intensity. It moved east, reaching EF1 strength and heavily damaging a poultry barn. The tornado entered town and moved along a northeasterly path through Eldon, maintaining EF1 intensity. Homes and trees in town were damaged, and a few homes lost large portions of their roofs. A small apartment building had its roof blown off, and a church sustained shingle damage. Cars along US 54 were damaged as the tornado exited town and moved to the northeast. Outside of town, EF1 damage continued to occur as outbuildings were damaged, trees were snapped, a mobile home was blown off its foundation, and homes sustained severe roof damage. The tornado then reached EF2 strength shortly after it crossed into Cole County, completely destroying two barns. Just beyond this point, the tornado passed over Lake Carmel, causing roof damage to numerous lakeside homes, one of which had it roof removed entirely. Weakening back to EF1 intensity, the tornado caused mainly tree and outbuilding damage as it continued to the northeast. Regaining EF2 status, the tornado ripped the roof off of a brick home and destroyed its attached garage as it crossed Highway D. A few other homes sustained lesser damage in this area as well. EF2 damage continued as the tornado crossed Loesch Road, destroying outbuildings and snapping numerous large trees. Two homes near the intersection of Probst Road and Beck Road lost much of their roofs as well. To the northeast of this location, the tornado widened as it entered a subdivision along the Heritage Highway, heavily damaging multiple homes at EF2 strength. Several mobile homes were also destroyed at a nearby mobile home park, and a large RC racing barn was completely flattened. Just north of the mobile home park, the tornado reached its peak point of intensity, where a house was leveled and swept away at high-end EF3 strength. Surveyors noted that this house was not properly attached to its foundation, and damage to nearby trees was not consistent with that of a tornado stronger than EF3 in intensity. A nearby home sustained low-end EF3 damage, sustaining roof and exterior wall loss, while another house near Twin Bridges Road sustained EF2 damage. Farther along the path, the tornado weakened to high-end EF2 strength as it crossed Moreau Ridge Lane and Hohm Way, tearing the roof and exterior walls from a house and obliterating several outbuildings. Additional EF2 damage occurred to trees, some homes, and outbuildings along Oakridge Road and points to the northeast. Maintaining EF2 intensity, the tornado then crossed Route CC, damaging or destroying several houses, outbuildings, manufactured homes, and a warehouse.

EF2 damage continued as the tornado reached the southwestern fringes of Jefferson City, where it impacted Donnie Braun & Sons Auto Repair and Storage. Several large storage buildings and garages were destroyed at this location, with debris strewn in all directions. Numerous RVs, trucks, and trailers were tossed and damaged as well. The nearby Tergin Motors building also sustained EF2 damage. Across the Heritage Highway, several homes were badly damaged in a small subdivision along Hiview Drive. The tornado proceeded to follow the CE Red Whaley Expressway into town, striking a car dealership, where approximately 500 cars were damaged or destroyed, with losses estimated at $15–30 million. Numerous vehicles were thrown into piles, and a large metal automotive service building was completely destroyed at high-end EF2 strength in this area. Just beyond this point, multiple restaurants and businesses were damaged, and injuries were reported at a Best Western hotel that was impacted. The tornado proceeded to cross Ellis Boulevard, heavily damaging multiple self-storage buildings, a gas station, a Sonic Drive-in, a church, and several other businesses. At the Hawthorne Park Apartments, EF3 damage occurred as several well-built, two-story brick apartment buildings had their roofs torn off, and sustained collapse of numerous second floor exterior walls. High-end EF3 damage was noted along Four Seasons Drive, where two large metal-framed industrial buildings were leveled to the ground. Metal support beams were severely mangled at this location. The nearby Jefferson City Job Center was damaged at EF2 strength, sustaining significant roof and wall damage. Cars in the parking lot were damaged by flying debris as well. Continuing through residential neighborhoods to the northeast, the tornado weakened briefly, with numerous homes sustaining EF1 roof damage along this segment of the path, though one home sustained EF2 damage along Holiday Drive. The tornado quickly regained EF2 intensity as it tore directly down Jackson Street, snapping numerous trees and power poles and ripping the roofs off of dozens of homes. A few houses in this area sustained high-end EF2 damage, sustaining loss of their second floor exterior walls. The Adkins Football Stadium also sustained considerable damage from the tornado. Maintaining its strength, the tornado then crossed over the Rex M Whitton Expressway and moved through the eastern fringes of downtown Jefferson City. Along this corridor, EF2 damage continued as numerous businesses, government buildings, and historic homes had their roofs ripped off, and many trees and power lines were downed. Simonsen Jr High School also sustained heavy damage and numerous broken windows. The historic Missouri State Penitentiary sustained severe roof damage and had many windows blown out, and a portion of the large stone wall surrounding the facility collapsed. Past downtown, the tornado crossed the Missouri River and weakened, causing only EF1 tree damage to the south of the Jefferson City Memorial Airport. The tornado then lifted and dissipated as it reached the Railwood Golf Club. At least 20 people required rescue from collapsed structures following the tornado, and multiple gas leaks were reported in the city.

At least 33 people were injured by this tornado, and one person was killed, with the fatality being a 61-year-old man who died of his injuries in the days following the tornado. The tornado was on the ground for 32.63 miles (52.51 km), reached a peak width of 1,500 yards (1,400 m), and had peak winds estimated at 160 mph (230 ft/s). Jefferson City residents had at least 30 minutes advance warning before the tornado hit, although many residents were already asleep by the time warnings were issued. The American Red Cross opened one shelter in Jefferson City and two in Eldon. Spokeswoman Sharon Watson says 50 people were at the Jefferson City shelter as of late morning. On May 27, Governor Mike Parson activated the Missouri National Guard to assist with clean up efforts.

== Non-tornadic effects ==
=== Flooding ===
This storm system prolonged an ongoing heavy precipitation event across much of the southern Plains, Midwest, and eastern Canada, which included an unusually late, record-setting heavy snow event in the Midwest. In eastern Canada, the previous flooding was already being described as 100-year events. Most of this region had received between 5–10 inches (130–250 mm) of rain during April. Several localities had broken April precipitation records before the additional rainfall from the May 2019 outbreak. The Quad Cities of Iowa and Illinois had just ended a record-breaking 51-day record for most days above major flood stage on May 12 before the new set of storms hit; many of the upstream cities along the Mississippi and Ohio were in a similar position. Much of the northeastern U.S. as well as eastern Canada had been dealing with continual rain since snowmelt, which had been causing previous extensive flooding. The addition of the wide-reaching heavy rainfall from the May series of storms to the already-saturated ground intensified river flooding and flash flooding effects.

==== Flash flooding ====
The torrential rain resulted in frequent flash-flooding. One-third of all flash-flooding reports during April and May came from Kansas, Oklahoma, and Missouri. A rare high-risk outlook for excessive rainfall was issued for the region surrounding Oklahoma City on May 20. By May 28, every single county in Oklahoma was under a state of emergency due to tornadoes or flooding. In at least one case, the NWS assessment team was unable to determine tornado-specific damage due to continuing flooding. On May 8, a man drowned in Austin, Texas, after he was swept away by a flash flood. A woman drowned in her vehicle on May 21 after driving around barricades northeast of Oklahoma City. A four-year-old-boy was swept away in a flooded creek in Indiana. One person drowned in his van near Fort Chaffee, Arkansas.

==== River and lakeshore flooding ====
Large parts of the Mississippi River system were already in the midst of the longest-lasting flood fight since 1927 before the current severe storm exacerbated the situation. On May 21, Baton Rouge, Louisiana broke the previous record for its longest-ever flood event, at 136 days. Vicksburg, Mississippi has been in continuous flood stage since February 17. The Missouri River at Jefferson City reached its highest level since 1995. The Mississippi River at St. Louis reached a second crest in less than a month, surpassed only by the Great Flood of 1993. The Morganza Spillway upriver from Baton Rouge, Louisiana, will be opened on June 2 for the third time in its history; it is opened when river flows at the Red River Landing are predicted to reach 1.5 million cf. The Bonnet Carré Spillway has been opened twice in the same year for the first time since it was built in 1931. The flood flight was in its 216th day, and later surpassed the 1973 record of 225 days.

On May 14, two people drowned on a flooded rural road 40 miles north of St. Louis. One man died in Kay County, Oklahoma, on May 23 after being surrounded by floodwater from the Chikaskia River. On May 21, two people were killed in a traffic accident in Missouri when their vehicle lost traction in heavy rain.

=== Other non-tornadic effects ===
Most of the tornadic storms were accompanied by strong straight-line winds and large hail. Baseball-sized hail was reported in Colorado and Nebraska. Straight-line winds of 94 mph (151 km/h) were reported near Marshall, Oklahoma, on May 20.

In the Black Hills of South Dakota, up to 25 inches (64 cm) of snow fell. The snowstorm also resulted in Mount Rushmore closing on May 21.

== See also ==
- Weather of 2019
- List of North American tornadoes and tornado outbreaks
