= Afton, Texas =

- unincorporated community
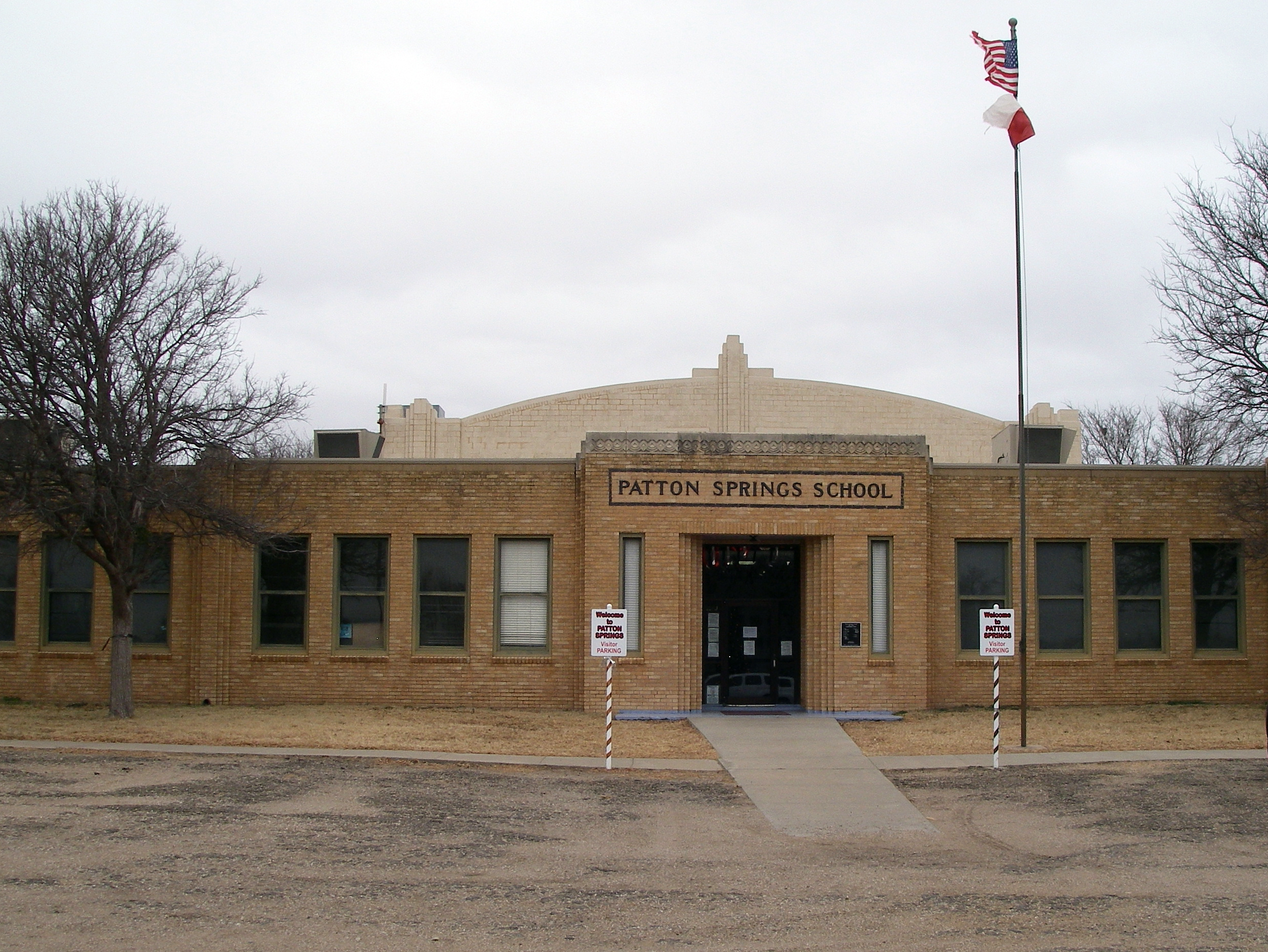
- Patton Springs School

- Location within Texas Location within the United States
- Coordinates: 33°45′46″N 100°49′00″W
- Country: United States
- State: Texas
- County: Dickens
- Region: Llano Estacado
- Established: 1893
- Elevation: 2,536 ft (773 m)
- Time zone: UTC-6 (CST)
- ZIP code: 79220
- Area code: 806

Afton is an unincorporated community in northern Dickens County, Texas, United States.

== History ==
A post office was established in the community under the name Beckton in 1893, and the name was changed to Afton in 1900. The present name is derived from the poem Sweet Afton by Robert Burns.

== Education ==
The Patton Springs Independent School District serves area students.

== Notable person ==
- Country musician Trent Willmon was raised on a ranch near Afton.

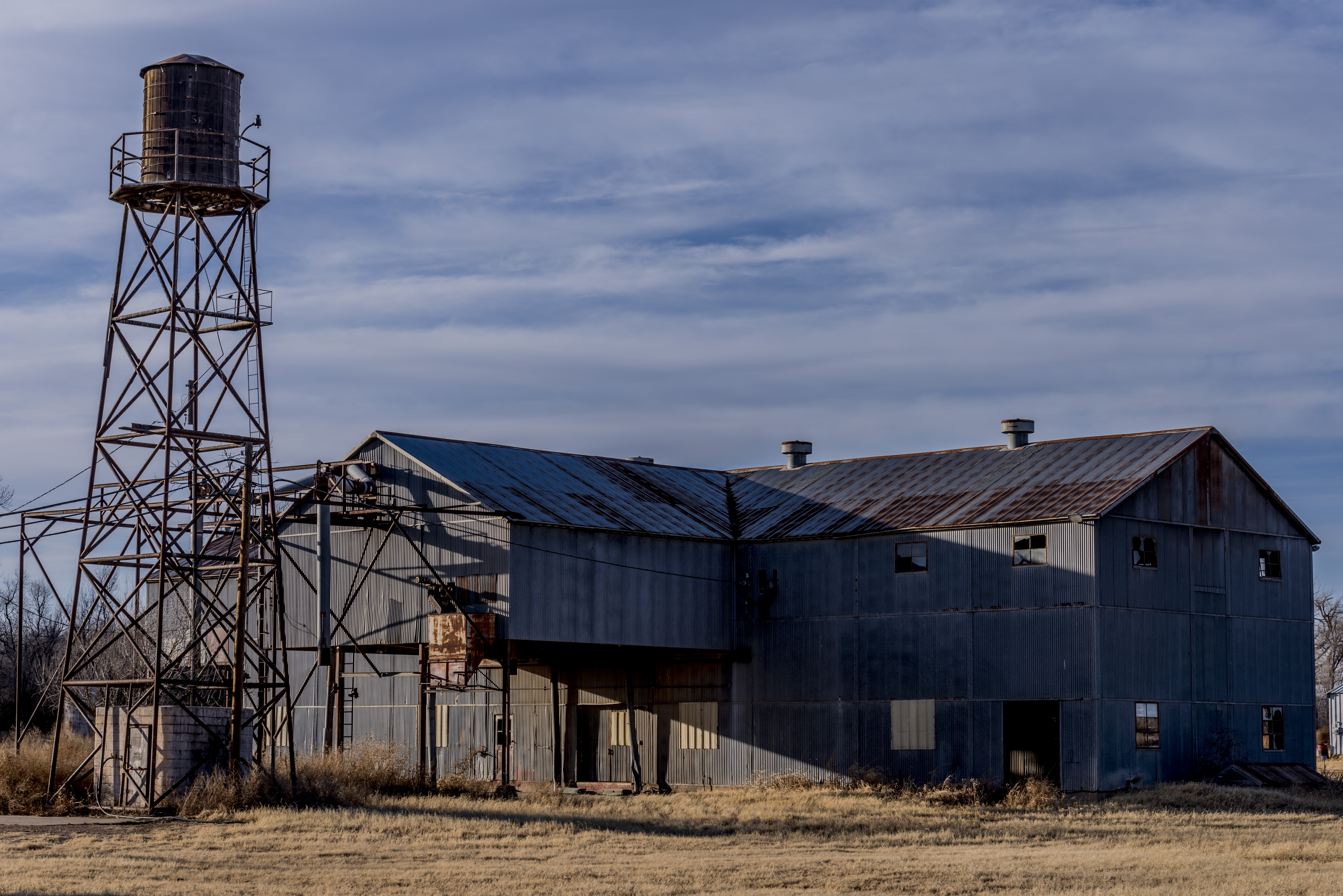
Afton Gin, 2018

== See also ==
- Battle of Pease River
- Little Red River
- Pease River
- Quitaque Creek
- Salt Fork Brazos River
- Washita River
- Wichita River
