= Patton Springs Independent School District =

School district in Texas

Coordinates: 33.7664°N 100.8195°W

Patton Springs Independent School District is a public school district based in the community of Afton, Texas, United States. In addition to Afton, the district serves a portion of Dickens and rural areas in northeastern Dickens County. Patton Springs ISD has one school that serves students in prekindergarten through grade 12.

== Academic achievement ==
In 2009, the school district was rated "exemplary" by the Texas Education Agency.

== Special programs ==
=== Athletics ===
Patton Springs High School plays six-man football.

== See also ==
- List of school districts in Texas
