= Spur Independent School District =

School district in Texas

Coordinates: 33°29′2″N 100°51′36″W

Spur Independent School District is a public school district based in Spur, Texas, United States.

In addition to Spur, the district also serves McAdoo, a portion of Dickens, as well as rural areas in western and southern Dickens County. A very small portion of Kent County also lies within the district.

Spur ISD has one school that serves students in grades pre-kindergarten through twelve.

== History ==
The McAdoo school was consolidated with the Spur Independent School District in 1985. The former McAdoo Independent School District was disestablished on July 1, 1985.

In 2009, the school district was rated "academically acceptable" by the Texas Education Agency.

== Notable alumni ==
- Marshall Formby
