= McAdoo, Texas =

- Unincorporated community
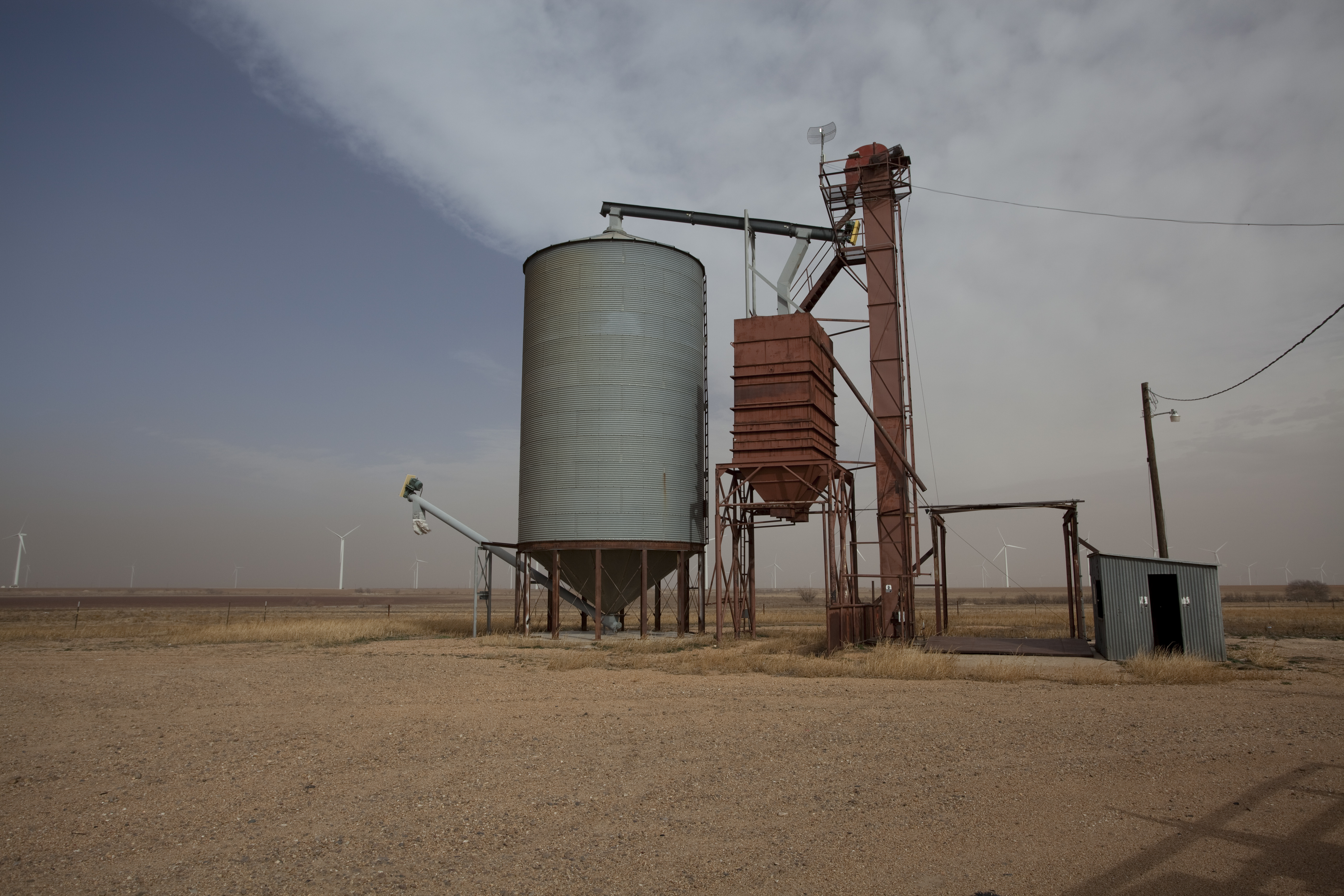
- Small grain-handling facility in McAdoo

- Location within Texas Location within the United States
- Coordinates: 33°44′02″N 101°00′23″W
- Country: United States
- State: Texas
- County: Dickens
- Physiographic region: Llano Estacado
- Founded: 1915
- Elevation: 2,982 ft (909 m)
- Time zone: UTC-6 (Central (CST))
  - Summer (DST): UTC-5 (CDT)
- Area code: 806
- Website: Handbook of Texas

McAdoo is an unincorporated community in northwestern Dickens County, Texas, United States.

== History ==
McAdoo is named for the former United States Secretary of the Treasury William Gibbs McAdoo, son-in-law of U.S. President Woodrow Wilson. The Texas politician, journalist, and attorney Marshall Formby was reared in McAdoo and is interred there at McAdoo Cemetery. Formby's nephew, Clint Formby, who was also reared in McAdoo, maintained the longest-running radio broadcast by a single host in the United States.

== Education ==
The McAdoo school was consolidated with the Spur Independent School District in 1985. The former McAdoo Independent School District was disestablished on July 1, 1985.

The Texas Legislature designated the county as being in the Western Texas College District.

== Economy ==
=== Wind energy ===
Invenergy LLC constructed a 150 MW wind power plant near this community. The project consists of 100 GE 1.5 MW wind turbines and came online in late summer/early fall 2008. The project is providing a large economic boost for the area and most of the population.

== See also ==
- Caprock Escarpment
- Blanco Canyon
- Llano Estacado
- Mount Blanco
