= Dickens County, Texas =

County in Texas, United States

- County
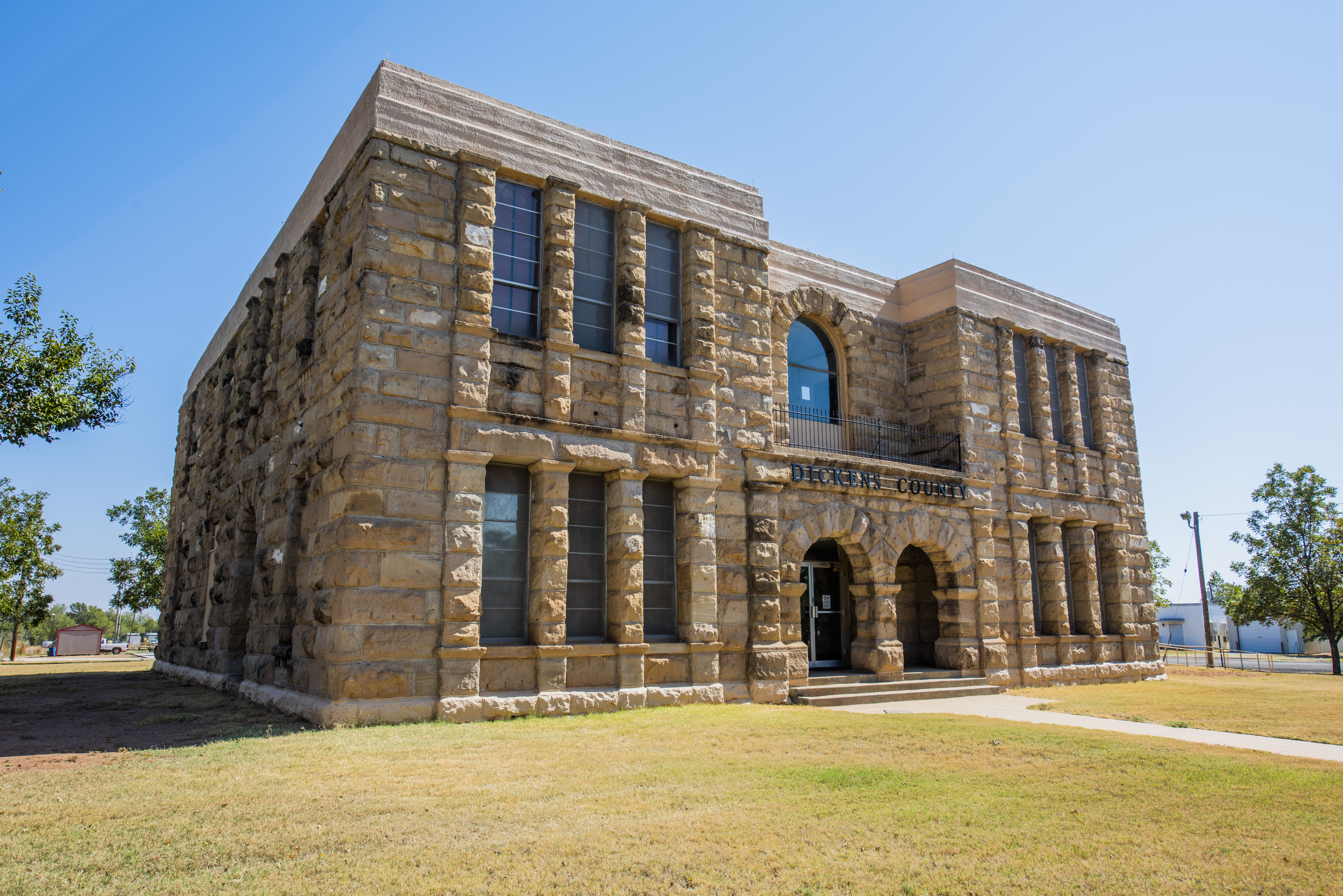
- The Dickens County Courthouse in Dickens

- Location within the U.S. state of Texas
- Coordinates: 33°37′N 100°47′W
- Country: United States
- State: Texas
- Founded: 1891
- Seat: Dickens
- Largest city: Spur

Area
  - Total: 905 sq mi (2,340 km^{2})
  - Land: 902 sq mi (2,340 km^{2})
  - Water: 3.5 sq mi (9.1 km^{2}) 0.4%

Population (2020)
  - Total: 1,770
  - Estimate (2025): 1,692 ▼
  - Density: 1.96/sq mi (0.758/km^{2})
- Time zone: UTC−6 (Central)
  - Summer (DST): UTC−5 (CDT)
- Congressional district: 13th
- Website: www.co.dickens.tx.us

Dickens County is a county located in the U.S. state of Texas. As of the 2020 census, its population was 1,770. Its county seat is Dickens. The county was created in 1876 and later organized in 1891. Both the county and its seat are named for J. Dickens, who died at the Battle of the Alamo.

== Geography ==
According to the U.S. Census Bureau, the county has a total area of 905 square miles (2,340 km^{2}), of which 902 square miles (2,340 km^{2}) are land and 3.5 square miles (9.1 km^{2}) (0.4%) are covered by water.

=== Major highways ===
- U.S. Highway 82 / State Highway 114
- State Highway 70
- State Highway 208
- Loop 21
- Loop 120

=== Adjacent counties ===
- Motley County (north)
- King County (east)
- Kent County (south)
- Crosby County (west)
- Garza County (southwest)
- Floyd County (northwest)
- Cottle County (northeast)
- Stonewall County (southeast)

== Demographics ==
Historical population
Census	Pop.	Note	%±
1880	28		—
1890	295		953.6%
1900	1,151		290.2%
1910	3,092		168.6%
1920	5,876		90.0%
1930	8,601		46.4%
1940	7,847		−8.8%
1950	7,177		−8.5%
1960	4,963		−30.8%
1970	3,737		−24.7%
1980	3,539		−5.3%
1990	2,571		−27.4%
2000	2,762		7.4%
2010	2,444		−11.5%
2020	1,770		−27.6%
2025 (est.)	1,692	▼	−4.4%
U.S. Decennial Census; 1850–2010 2010 2020

=== Racial and ethnic composition ===
Dickens County, Texas – Racial and ethnic composition Note: the US Census treats Hispanic/Latino as an ethnic category. This table excludes Latinos from the racial categories and assigns them to a separate category. Hispanics/Latinos may be of any race.
Race / Ethnicity (NH = Non-Hispanic)	Pop 2000	Pop 2010	Pop 2020	% 2000	% 2010	% 2020
White alone (NH)	1,857	1,590	1,178	67.23%	65.06%	66.55%
Black or African American alone (NH)	223	92	18	8.07%	3.76%	1.02%
Native American or Alaska Native alone (NH)	3	21	0	0.11%	0.86%	0.00%
Asian alone (NH)	3	18	1	0.11%	0.74%	0.06%
Pacific Islander alone (NH)	1	0	2	0.04%	0.00%	0.11%
Other race alone (NH)	3	0	7	0.11%	0.00%	0.40%
Mixed race or Multiracial (NH)	12	15	52	0.43%	0.61%	2.94%
Hispanic or Latino (any race)	660	708	512	23.90%	28.97%	28.93%
Total	2,762	2,444	1,770	100.00%	100.00%	100.00%

=== 2020 census ===
As of the 2020 census, the county had a population of 1,770. The median age was 47.3 years. 22.7% of residents were under the age of 18 and 25.4% of residents were 65 years of age or older. For every 100 females there were 96.7 males, and for every 100 females age 18 and over there were 95.3 males age 18 and over.

The racial makeup of the county was 77.0% White, 1.7% Black or African American, 0.7% American Indian and Alaska Native, 0.1% Asian, 0.1% Native Hawaiian and Pacific Islander, 9.2% from some other race, and 11.2% from two or more races. Hispanic or Latino residents of any race comprised 28.9% of the population.

<0.1% of residents lived in urban areas, while 100.0% lived in rural areas.

There were 778 households in the county, of which 28.5% had children under the age of 18 living in them. Of all households, 49.1% were married-couple households, 21.7% were households with a male householder and no spouse or partner present, and 24.8% were households with a female householder and no spouse or partner present. About 30.7% of all households were made up of individuals and 16.9% had someone living alone who was 65 years of age or older.

There were 1,165 housing units, of which 33.2% were vacant. Among occupied housing units, 76.2% were owner-occupied and 23.8% were renter-occupied. The homeowner vacancy rate was 0.2% and the rental vacancy rate was 7.5%.

=== 2000 census ===
As of the census of 2000, 2,762 people, 980 households, and 638 families resided in the county. The population density was 3 people per square mile (1.2 people/km^{2}). The 1,368 housing units averaged 2 per square mile (0.77/km^{2}). The racial makeup of the county was 77.62% White, 8.18% African American, 0.36% Native American, 0.11% Asian, 0.25% Pacific Islander, 12.35% from other races, and 1.12% from two or more races. About 23.90% of the population was Hispanic or Latino of any race.

Of the 980 households, 23.10% had children under the age of 18 living with them, 54.60% were married couples living together, 7.90% had a female householder with no husband present, and 34.80% were not families. About 32.40% of all households were made up of individuals, and 17.60% had someone living alone who was 65 years of age or older. The average household size was 2.29 and the average family size was 2.89.

In the county, the population was distributed as 18.50% under the age of 18, 10.40% from 18 to 24, 29.70% from 25 to 44, 22.40% from 45 to 64, and 19.00% who were 65 years of age or older. The median age was 39 years. For every 100 females, there were 130.70 males. For every 100 females age 18 and over, there were 141.90 males.

The median income for a household in the county was $25,898, and for a family was $32,500. Males had a median income of $25,000 versus $18,571 for females. The per capita income for the county was $13,156. About 14.10% of families and 17.40% of the population were below the poverty line, including 21.30% of those under age 18 and 18.20% of those age 65 or over.

== Communities ==
=== Cities ===
- Dickens (county seat)
- Spur

=== Unincorporated communities ===
- Afton
- McAdoo

== Notable people ==
- Red McCombs, businessman and sports franchise owner

== Education ==
There are two school districts in the county: Patton Springs Independent School District and Spur Independent School District.

The Texas Legislature designated the county as being in the Western Texas College District.

== Elected leadership ==
Legislative Representation	Name	Service
United States Congress, District 13	Ronny Jackson	2021 – Present
State Senator, District 28	Charles Perry	2014 – Present
State Representative, District 83	Dustin Burrows	January 1, 2023 – Present

County Elected Leadership	Name	Service
County Judge	Kevin Brendle	2015 – present
County Commissioner Pct 1	Dennis Wyatt	2017 – present
County Commissioner Pct 2	Mike Smith	2015 – present
County Commissioner Pct 3	Chris Horn	2025 – present
County Commissioner Pct 4	Greg Arnold	2023 – present
110th District Attorney	Emily Teegardin (Silverton)	2023 – present
District & County Clerk	Danay Carnes	2022 – present
County Sheriff	Jay Allen	2025 – present
County Attorney	Aaron Clements	2018 – present
County Tax Assessor-collector	Rhonda Brendle	2025 – present
County Treasurer	Brandi Abbott	2023 – present
Justice of the Peace	Stella Carter	2023 – present

== Politics ==
Following redistricting after the 2020 census, effective January 1, 2023, Dickens County is in Texas House of Representatives District 83, represented by Republican Dustin Burrows, an attorney from Lubbock. Dickens County was previously in House District 68. In the Texas Senate, Dickens County is presently in District 28, represented by Republican Charles Perry.

Like much of West Texas, Dickens now leans heavily Republican, giving less than 15% of the vote to Hillary Clinton in 2016, though it did support her husband, Bill Clinton, in both 1992 and 1996, in the former election supporting him by double digits over Texas resident George H.W. Bush. However, the county historically leaned heavily Democratic, having previously even voted against Ronald Reagan in both his 1980 and 1984 landslides, and against native son Dwight D. Eisenhower in 1952 and 1956.

United States presidential election results for Dickens County, Texas
Year	Republican		Democratic		Third party(ies)	
Year	No.	%	No.	%	No.	%
1912	11	3.34%	277	84.19%	41	12.46%
1916	15	3.39%	389	87.81%	39	8.80%
1920	109	18.83%	433	74.78%	37	6.39%
1924	161	15.78%	849	83.24%	10	0.98%
1928	741	64.10%	415	35.90%	0	0.00%
1932	63	4.03%	1,491	95.45%	8	0.51%
1936	115	7.37%	1,445	92.57%	1	0.06%
1940	246	12.43%	1,728	87.32%	5	0.25%
1944	141	7.50%	1,617	86.06%	121	6.44%
1948	115	6.76%	1,492	87.76%	93	5.47%
1952	782	38.43%	1,249	61.38%	4	0.20%
1956	565	31.25%	1,243	68.75%	0	0.00%
1960	521	32.42%	1,075	66.89%	11	0.68%
1964	339	20.34%	1,324	79.42%	4	0.24%
1968	428	27.90%	811	52.87%	295	19.23%
1972	708	56.87%	534	42.89%	3	0.24%
1976	343	21.83%	1,222	77.78%	6	0.38%
1980	554	37.41%	912	61.58%	15	1.01%
1984	594	45.90%	692	53.48%	8	0.62%
1988	435	38.12%	696	61.00%	10	0.88%
1992	373	32.16%	536	46.21%	251	21.64%
1996	421	39.98%	509	48.34%	123	11.68%
2000	589	66.86%	284	32.24%	8	0.91%
2004	815	76.67%	245	23.05%	3	0.28%
2008	730	75.10%	234	24.07%	8	0.82%
2012	793	77.82%	216	21.20%	10	0.98%
2016	755	83.06%	128	14.08%	26	2.86%
2020	853	86.34%	130	13.16%	5	0.51%
2024	844	84.99%	146	14.70%	3	0.30%

United States Senate election results for Dickens County, Texas1
Year	Republican		Democratic		Third party(ies)	
Year	No.	%	No.	%	No.	%
2024	817	83.11%	148	15.06%	18	1.83%

United States Senate election results for Dickens County, Texas2
Year	Republican		Democratic		Third party(ies)	
Year	No.	%	No.	%	No.	%
2020	808	84.34%	133	13.88%	17	1.77%

Texas Gubernatorial election results for Dickens County
Year	Republican		Democratic		Third party(ies)	
Year	No.	%	No.	%	No.	%
2022	684	86.47%	98	12.39%	9	1.14%

== See also ==
- National Register of Historic Places listings in Dickens County, Texas
- Recorded Texas Historic Landmarks in Dickens County
