= Carl Junction, Missouri =

- City
- Location of Carl Junction, Missouri
- Coordinates: 37°10′01″N 94°32′49″W
- Country: United States
- State: Missouri
- County: Jasper

Government
  - Mayor: Tom Paul

Area
  - Total: 5.61 sq mi (14.52 km^{2})
  - Land: 5.47 sq mi (14.17 km^{2})
  - Water: 0.13 sq mi (0.34 km^{2})
- Elevation: 856 ft (261 m)

Population (2020)
  - Total: 8,143
  - Density: 1,488.1/sq mi (574.56/km^{2})
- Time zone: UTC-6 (Central (CST))
  - Summer (DST): UTC-5 (CDT)
- ZIP code: 64834
- Area code: 417
- FIPS code: 29-11368
- GNIS feature ID: 2393742
- Website: carljunction.org

Carl Junction is a city in Jasper County, Missouri, United States. The population was 8,143 at the 2020 census.

== History ==
Carl Junction was laid out near a railroad junction by Charles Skinner, who gave the town his German first name of Carl. A post office called Carl Junction has been in operation since 1878.

Carl Junction has a recent history of violent tornadoes. The city was struck by an F3 tornado on May 4, 2003. On May 22, 2019, the city was hit with an EF3 tornado, causing damage to several buildings. The city had a third tornado, an EF0 on May 2, 2024 causing minor damage in a subdivision in the eastern part of the city. A fourth tornado struck through the heart of the city on Easter Sunday, April 20, 2025, this was an EF1 that removed the roofs off two large business buildings downtown, flattened a pavilion at the grade school and damaged multiple solar panel arrays near city hall.

== Geography ==
According to the United States Census Bureau, the city has a total area of 5.61 square miles (14.53 km^{2}), of which 5.48 square miles (14.19 km^{2}) is land and 0.13 square miles (0.34 km^{2}) is water.

Carl Junction is approximately eight miles from Joplin.

== Demographics ==
Historical population
| Census | Pop. | Note | %± |
|---|---|---|---|
| 1890 | 699 | | — |
| 1900 | 1,177 | | 68.4% |
| 1910 | 1,115 | | −5.3% |
| 1920 | 1,377 | | 23.5% |
| 1930 | 1,042 | | −24.3% |
| 1940 | 1,039 | | −0.3% |
| 1950 | 1,006 | | −3.2% |
| 1960 | 1,220 | | 21.3% |
| 1970 | 1,661 | | 36.1% |
| 1980 | 3,937 | | 137.0% |
| 1990 | 4,123 | | 4.7% |
| 2000 | 5,294 | | 28.4% |
| 2010 | 7,445 | | 40.6% |
| 2020 | 8,143 | | 9.4% |
| 2024 (est.) | 8,435 | | 3.6% |
U.S. Decennial Census

Carl Junction is part of the Joplin, Missouri Metropolitan Statistical Area.

=== 2020 census ===
As of the 2020 census, Carl Junction had a population of 8,143. The population density was 1,488.7 inhabitants per square mile (574.7/km^{2}). The median age was 35.6 years. 29.6% of residents were under the age of 18 and 14.7% of residents were 65 years of age or older. For every 100 females there were 91.7 males, and for every 100 females age 18 and over there were 89.7 males age 18 and over.

99.1% of residents lived in urban areas, while 0.9% lived in rural areas.

There were 2,941 households in Carl Junction, of which 41.3% had children under the age of 18 living in them. Of all households, 59.5% were married-couple households, 12.0% were households with a male householder and no spouse or partner present, and 22.6% were households with a female householder and no spouse or partner present. About 20.5% of all households were made up of individuals and 10.2% had someone living alone who was 65 years of age or older.

There were 3,078 housing units, of which 4.5% were vacant. The homeowner vacancy rate was 0.5% and the rental vacancy rate was 7.7%.

Racial composition as of the 2020 census
| Race | Number | Percent |
|---|---|---|
| White | 7,109 | 87.3% |
| Black or African American | 73 | 0.9% |
| American Indian and Alaska Native | 139 | 1.7% |
| Asian | 67 | 0.8% |
| Native Hawaiian and Other Pacific Islander | 0 | 0.0% |
| Some other race | 75 | 0.9% |
| Two or more races | 680 | 8.4% |
| Hispanic or Latino (of any race) | 283 | 3.5% |

=== Income and poverty ===
The 2016–2020 5-year American Community Survey estimates show that the median household income was $61,250 (with a margin of error of +/- $6,888) and the median family income was $72,471 (+/- $9,350). Males had a median income of $56,938 (+/- $9,947) versus $25,824 (+/- $3,429) for females. The median income for those above 16 years old was $39,852 (+/- $5,575). Approximately, 7.0% of families and 8.2% of the population were below the poverty line, including 6.8% of those under the age of 18 and 3.4% of those ages 65 or over.

=== 2010 census ===
As of the census of 2010, there were 7,445 people, 2,616 households, and 2,061 families living in the city. The population density was 1,358.6 inhabitants per square mile (524.6/km^{2}). There were 2,769 housing units at an average density of 505.3 per square mile (195.1/km^{2}). The racial makeup of the city was 93.3% White, 1.0% African American, 1.3% Native American, 1.0% Asian, 0.8% from other races, and 2.6% from two or more races. Hispanic or Latino of any race were 2.9% of the population.

There were 2,616 households, of which 45.5% had children under the age of 18 living with them, 63.3% were married couples living together, 11.4% had a female householder with no husband present, 4.1% had a male householder with no wife present, and 21.2% were non-families. 17.9% of all households were made up of individuals, and 8.6% had someone living alone who was 65 years of age or older. The average household size was 2.84 and the average family size was 3.18.

The median age in the city was 34.7 years. 31.4% of residents were under the age of 18; 6.5% were between the ages of 18 and 24; 27.6% were from 25 to 44; 22.8% were from 45 to 64; and 11.6% were 65 years of age or older. The gender makeup of the city was 48.2% male and 51.8% female.

=== 2000 census ===
As of the census of 2000, there were 5,294 people, 1,871 households, and 1,534 families living in the city. The population density was 1,084.6 inhabitants per square mile (418.8/km^{2}). There were 2,006 housing units at an average density of 411.0 per square mile (158.7/km^{2}). The racial makeup of the city was 96.11% White, 0.43% African American, 1.27% Native American, 0.36% Asian, 0.1% Dutch, 0.2% Other from other races, and 1.49% from two or more races. Hispanic or Latino of any race were 1.51% of the population.

There were 1,871 households, out of which 45.5% had individuals under the age of 18, 70.0% were married couples living together, 9.0% had a female householder with no husband present, and 18.0% were non-families. 15.6% of all households were made up of individuals, and 6.5% had someone living alone who was 65 years of age or older. The average household size was 2.81 and the average family size was 3.12.

In the city the population was spread out, with 30.0% under the age of 18, 7.2% from 18 to 24, 30.8% from 25 to 44, 22.8% from 45 to 64, and 9.3% who were 65 years of age or older. The median age was 34 years. For every 100 females, there were 95.3 males. For every 100 females age 18 and over, there were 91.6 males.

The median income for a household in the city was $42,575, and the median income for a family was $47,723. Males had a median income of $32,583 versus $23,176 for females. The per capita income for the city was $18,291. About 3.2% of families and 5.1% of the population were below the poverty line, of those individuals below the poverty line, 41.8% were under 18 years of age and 10.4% were over 65 years of age.
