= Dickens, Texas =

- City
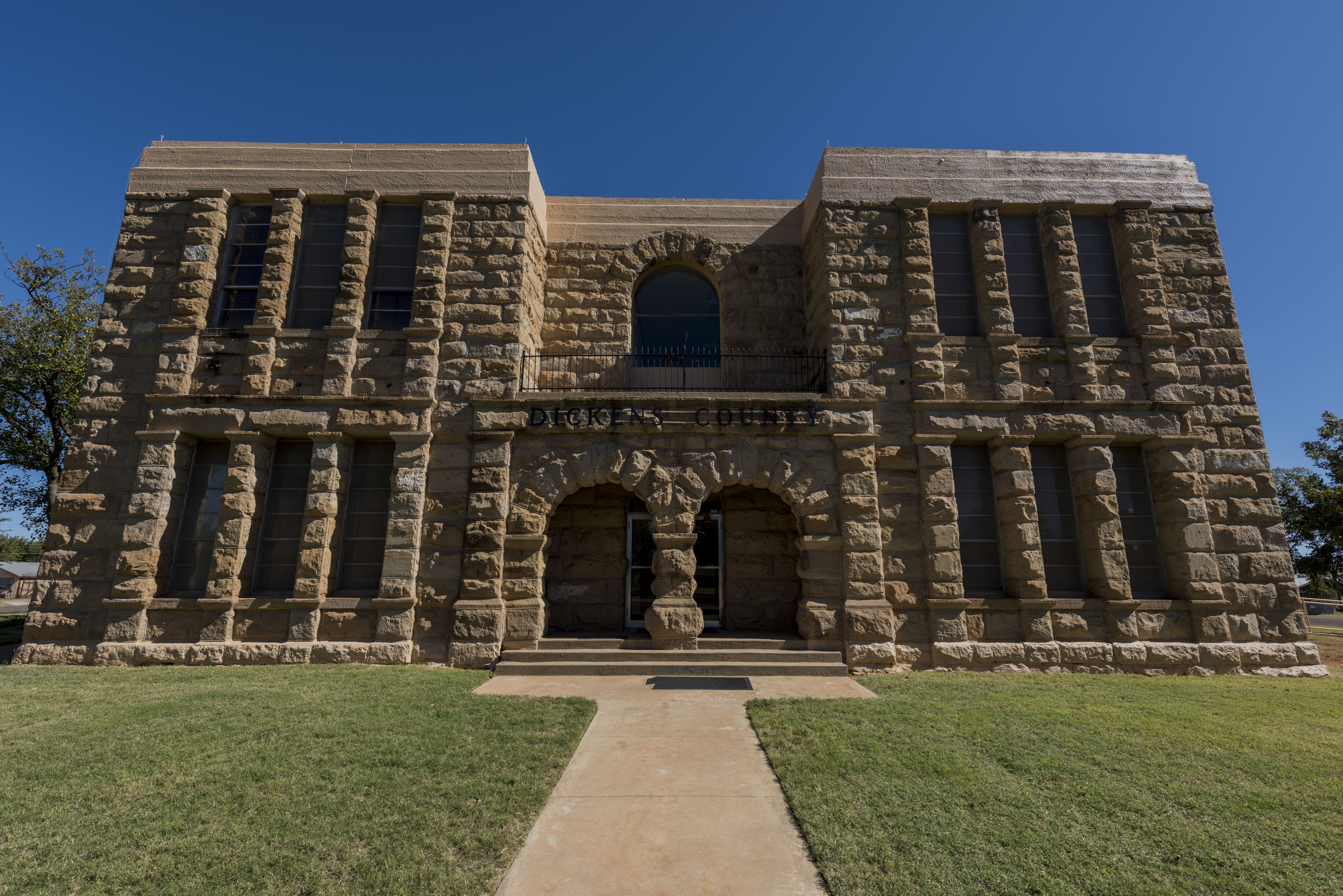
- The Dickens County Courthouse

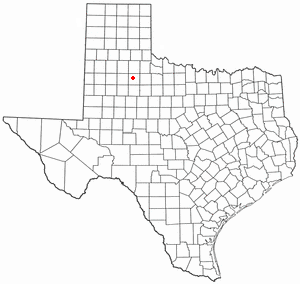
- Location of Dickens, Texas

- Coordinates: 33°37′17″N 100°50′6″W
- Country: United States
- State: Texas
- County: Dickens

Area
  - Total: 0.96 sq mi (2.48 km^{2})
  - Land: 0.96 sq mi (2.48 km^{2})
  - Water: 0 sq mi (0.00 km^{2})
- Elevation: 2,546 ft (776 m)

Population (2020)
  - Total: 219
  - Density: 229/sq mi (88.3/km^{2})
- Time zone: UTC-6 (Central (CST))
  - Summer (DST): UTC-5 (CDT)
- ZIP code: 79229
- Area code: 806
- FIPS code: 48-20332
- GNIS feature ID: 1356008

Dickens is a city in and the county seat of Dickens County, Texas, United States. The population was 219 at the 2020 census, down from 286 at the 2010 census.

Charles Weldon Cannon (1915–1997), a Dickens County native, made his famous boots and saddles in Dickens.

== Geography ==
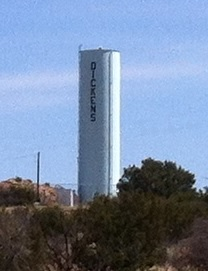
Water tower just outside Dickens

Dickens is located west of the center of Dickens County at 33°37′17″N 100°50′6″W (33.621341, –100.834987), with the Croton Breaks to the east and Mackenzie Peak to the north. U.S. Route 82 passes through Dickens, leading east 30 miles (48 km) to Guthrie and west 62 miles (100 km) to Lubbock. Texas State Highway 70 crosses the western side of town, leading north 28 miles (45 km) to Matador and southeast 34 miles (55 km) to Jayton.

According to the United States Census Bureau, the city of Dickens has a total area of 0.97 square miles (2.5 km^{2}), all land.

== Demographics ==
Historical population
Census	Pop.	Note	%±
1940	465		—
1950	420		−9.7%
1960	302		−28.1%
1970	295		−2.3%
1980	409		38.6%
1990	322		−21.3%
2000	332		3.1%
2010	286		−13.9%
2020	219		−23.4%
U.S. Decennial Census

=== Racial and ethnic composition ===
Racial composition as of the 2020 census
Race	Number	Percent
White	182	83.1%
Black or African American	3	1.4%
American Indian and Alaska Native	1	0.5%
Asian	0	0.0%
Native Hawaiian and Other Pacific Islander	0	0.0%
Some other race	14	6.4%
Two or more races	19	8.7%
Hispanic or Latino (of any race)	52	23.7%

=== 2020 census ===
As of the 2020 census, Dickens had a population of 219 people and 62 families residing in the city. The median age was 48.5 years, with 23.7% of residents under the age of 18 and 27.9% of residents 65 years of age or older. For every 100 females there were 95.5 males, and for every 100 females age 18 and over there were 96.5 males age 18 and over.

0.0% of residents lived in urban areas, while 100.0% lived in rural areas.

There were 95 households in Dickens, of which 23.2% had children under the age of 18 living in them. Of all households, 47.4% were married-couple households, 20.0% were households with a male householder and no spouse or partner present, and 28.4% were households with a female householder and no spouse or partner present. About 30.5% of all households were made up of individuals and 20.0% had someone living alone who was 65 years of age or older.

There were 151 housing units, of which 37.1% were vacant. The homeowner vacancy rate was 0.0% and the rental vacancy rate was 10.5%.

=== 2000 census ===
As of the census of 2000, there were 332 people, 133 households, and 88 families living in the city. The population density was 340.1 inhabitants per square mile (131.3/km^{2}). There were 163 housing units at an average density of 167.0 per square mile (64.5/km^{2}). The racial makeup of the city was 94.58% White, 4.52% from other races, and 0.90% from two or more races. Hispanic or Latino of any race were 9.04% of the population.

There were 133 households, out of which 27.8% had children under the age of 18 living with them, 56.4% were married couples living together, 6.0% had a female householder with no husband present, and 33.1% were non-families. 29.3% of all households were made up of individuals, and 15.0% had someone living alone who was 65 years of age or older. The average household size was 2.47 and the average family size was 3.08.

In the city, the population was spread out, with 25.9% under the age of 18, 6.0% from 18 to 24, 24.1% from 25 to 44, 25.3% from 45 to 64, and 18.7% who were 65 years of age or older. The median age was 39 years. For every 100 females, there were 100.0 males. For every 100 females age 18 and over, there were 98.4 males.

The median income for a household in the city was $19,875, and the median income for a family was $31,750. Males had a median income of $22,361 versus $18,750 for females. The per capita income for the city was $13,024. About 15.5% of families and 20.6% of the population were below the poverty line, including 16.3% of those under age 18 and 21.9% of those age 65 or over.

== Education ==
Dickens is divided between the Spur and Patton Springs Independent School Districts.

The Texas Legislature designated the county as being in the Western Texas College District.

== Climate ==
According to the Köppen climate classification, Dickens has a semiarid climate, BSk on climate maps.
