= List of memorials to Robert E. Lee =

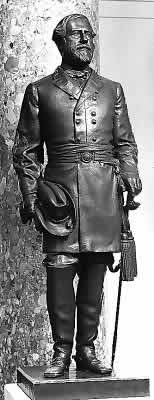
Robert E. Lee, a statue given to the National Statuary Hall by Virginia in 1909 (removed in favor of Barbara Rose Johns in 2020)

The following is a partial list of monuments and memorials to Robert E. Lee, who served as General in Chief of the Armies of the Confederate States in 1865. At the end is a listing of monuments and memorials to Lee that have been removed or renamed.

== Buildings ==
- Arlington House, The Robert E. Lee Memorial (U.S. National; Arlington, Virginia)
- Robert E. Lee Building / Hotel (Jackson, Mississippi)
- Robert E. Lee Inn (Morgan, New Jersey)

== Foods ==
- Robert E. Lee cake

== Holidays and events ==
- Robert E. Lee Day

== Military facilities ==
- Lee Barracks at U.S. Military Academy at West Point, New York (1962) - renaming recommended by commission

== Monuments and sculptures ==
- Gen. Robert E. Lee, C.S.A. historical marker (Tampa, Florida)
- Gen. Robert E. Lee historical marker (Hagerstown, Maryland)
- Gen. Robert E. Lee historical marker (Pickens, South Carolina)
- General Robert E. Lee historical marker (Yemassee, South Carolina)
- Lee Highway historical marker (Roanoke, Virginia)
- Robert E. Lee bust on Confederate Monument (Paris, Texas)
- Robert E. Lee Dixie Highway Historical Markers
  - in Franklin, Ohio
  - near Tennessee/North Carolina state line between Newport, Tennessee and Hot Springs, North Carolina
  - in Hot Springs, North Carolina
  - in Marshall, North Carolina
  - in Asheville, North Carolina
  - in Fletcher, North Carolina
  - in Hendersonville, North Carolina
  - near North Carolina/South Carolina state line
  - in Greenville, South Carolina
  - near Bradfordville, Florida
- Robert E. Lee Bridge Historical Marker (Richmond, Virginia)
- Robert E. Lee Memorial Highway marker (Columbia, South Carolina)
- Robert E. Lee memorial marker (Fort Myers, Florida)
- Robert E. Lee memorial marker (St. Louis, Missouri)
- Robert E. Lee Monument (Marianna, Arkansas), listed on the National Register of Historic Places (NRHP)
- Robert E. Lee, Virginia Monument (Gettysburg, Pennsylvania)
- Robert E. Lee Monument, Antietam National Battlefield (Washington County, Maryland), dedicated June 24, 2003
- Robert E. Lee statue and historical marker (Richmond Hill, Georgia)

== Roads ==
- General Robert E. Lee Circle (Spanish Fort, Alabama)
- General Robert E. Lee Road (Brunswick, Georgia)
- General Robert E. Lee Street (Stanley, North Carolina)
- Lee Avenue (Manassas, Virginia)
- Lee Boulevard (Richland, Washington) (Lee Blvd. historical marker on a corner of the road across from Richland High School)
- Lee Circle (New Orleans, Louisiana)
- Lee Drive (Baton Rouge, Louisiana)
- Lee Drive (Clarksdale, Mississippi)
- Lee Highway (former national auto trail)
- Lee-Jackson Memorial Highway (Fairfax County, Virginia)
- Lee Jackson Highway (Haines City, Florida)
- Lee Parkway (Dallas, Texas)
- Lee Road (Fairview Shores, Florida)
- Lee Road (Fort Myers, Florida)
- Lee Road (Macon, Georgia)
- Lee Street (Dallas, Texas)
- Lee Street (Blacksburg, Virginia)
- Lee Street (Warrenton, Virginia)
- Robert E. Lee Avenue (Elkins, West Virginia)
- Robert E. Lee Avenue (Timmonsville, South Carolina)
- Robert E. Lee Avenue (Waynesboro, Virginia)
- Robert E. Lee Boulevard (Bossier City, Louisiana)
- Robert E. Lee Boulevard (Charleston, South Carolina)
- Robert E. Lee Boulevard (Drummonds, Tennessee)
- Robert E. Lee Boulevard (Estero, Florida)
- Robert E. Lee Boulevard (James Island, South Carolina)
- Robert E. Lee Boulevard (Stone Mountain, Georgia)
- Robert E. Lee Boulevard (Vicksburg, Mississippi)
- Robert E. Lee Boulevard (Columbus, Georgia)
- Robert E. Lee Court (Nashville, Tennessee)
- Robert E. Lee Drive (Bristow, Virginia)
- Robert E. Lee Drive (Conroe, Texas)
- Robert E. Lee Drive (Flat Rock, Henderson County, North Carolina)
- Robert E. Lee Drive (Greenwood, Mississippi)
- Robert E. Lee Drive (Hopewell, Virginia)
- Robert E. Lee Drive (Jesup, Georgia)
- Robert E. Lee Drive (Killeen, Texas)
- Robert E. Lee Drive (Manchester, Tennessee)
- Robert E. Lee Drive (Marlin, Texas)
- Robert E. Lee Drive (Millbrook, Alabama)
- Robert E. Lee Drive (Nashville, Tennessee)
- Robert E. Lee Drive (Natural Bridge Station, Virginia)
- Robert E. Lee Drive (Newport, Tennessee)
- Robert E. Lee Drive (Odum, Georgia)
- Robert E. Lee Drive (Spotsylvania, Virginia)
- Robert E. Lee Drive (Tupelo, Mississippi)
- Robert E. Lee Drive (Tyler, Texas)
- Robert E. Lee Drive (Walterboro, South Carolina)
- Robert E. Lee Drive (Willard, North Carolina)
- Robert E. Lee Drive (Wilmington, North Carolina)
- Robert E. Lee Drive (Cincinnati, Ohio)
- Robert E. Lee Lane (Brentwood, Tennessee)
- Robert E. Lee Lane (Gila Bend, Arizona)
- Robert E. Lee Lane (Macclenny, Florida)
- Robert E. Lee Lane (Steamboat Springs, Colorado)
- Robert E. Lee Memorial Bridge (Richmond, Virginia)
- Robert E. Lee Parkway (Jonesboro, Georgia)
- Robert E. Lee Road (Deridder, Louisiana)
- Robert E. Lee Road (Hattiesburg, Mississippi)
- Robert E. Lee Road (Hunt, Texas)
- Robert E. Lee Road (Lucedale, Mississippi)
- Robert E. Lee Road (Powhatan, Virginia)
- Robert E. Lee Road (Reeds Spring, Missouri)
- Robert E. Lee Road (Tampa, Florida)
- Robert E. Lee Street (Andersonville, Georgia)
- Robert E. Lee Street (El Dorado, Arkansas)
- Robert E. Lee Street (Leeds, Alabama)
- Robert E. Lee Street (Malvern, Arkansas)
- Robert E. Lee Street (Mobile, Alabama)
- Robert E. Lee Street (Oglethorpe, Georgia)
- Robert E. Lee Street (Phoenix, Arizona)
- Robert E. Lee Way (Eufaula, Alabama)
- Robert Lee Court (Huntsville, Alabama)
- Robert Lee Lane (New Braunfels, Texas)
- Robert Lee Lane (Smyrna, Tennessee)
- Robert Lee Road (Trussville, Alabama)

== Schools ==
- East Lee County High School (Lehigh Acres, Florida)
- Lee County High School (Marianna, Arkansas)
- Lee County High School (Beattyville, Kentucky)
- Lee County High School (Sanford, North Carolina)
- Lee-Scott Academy (Auburn, Alabama)
- Robert E. Lee Academy (Bishopville, South Carolina), renamed Lee Academy
- Lee Elementary School of Technology/World Studies (Tampa, Florida)
- Robert E. Lee Elementary School (Durant, Oklahoma)
- Robert E. Lee Elementary School, (East Wenatchee, Washington) renamed Lee Elementary in 2018.
- Robert E. Lee Elementary School (Marshall, Texas)
- Robert E. Lee Elementary School (Satsuma, Alabama), renamed Lee Elementary School
- Robert E. Lee Elementary School (Springdale, Arkansas), renamed Lee Elementary School
- Robert E. Lee Elementary School (Tullahoma, Tennessee)
- Robert E. Lee High School (Baytown, Texas)
- Robert Lee High School (Robert Lee, Texas)
- Southern Lee High School (Sanford, North Carolina)
- Upson-Lee High School (Thomaston, Georgia)

== Settlements ==
- Fort Lee (Virginia), renamed Fort Gregg-Adams
- Leesville, Louisiana
- Relee, Georgia
- Robert Lee, Texas

== Ships ==
- CSS Robert E. Lee, a Confederate States Navy blockade runner
- Robert E. Lee (steamboat), a famous steamboat, built in 1866, usually travelling New Orleans–Natchez, Mississippi.
- SS Robert E. Lee (1924), an Eastern Steamship Lines ship sunk by German submarine U-166 in 1942
- USS Robert E. Lee (SSBN-601), a former (scrapped) United States Navy fleet ballistic missile submarine

== Universities and colleges ==
- Lee College in Baytown, Texas
- Washington and Lee University in Lexington, Virginia

== U.S. counties ==
- Lee County, Alabama
- Lee County, Arkansas
- Lee County, Florida
- Lee County, Kentucky
- Lee County, Mississippi
- Lee County, North Carolina
- Lee County, South Carolina
- Lee County, Texas

== Vehicles ==
- M3 Lee
- General Lee (car)

== Removed and renamed monuments and memorials to Lee, by state ==
- Alabama
  - Robert E. Lee High School (Montgomery, Alabama), now Dr. Percy L. Julian High School.
- California
  - Long Beach: Robert E. Lee Elementary School, renamed Olivia Herrera Elementary School on August 1, 2016.
  - San Diego: Robert E. Lee Elementary School, renamed Pacific View Leadership Elementary School on May 22, 2016.
- District of Columbia
  - Washington:
    - In 2017, Washington National Cathedral removed stained glass windows honoring Robert E. Lee and Stonewall Jackson.
    - In 2020, United States Capitol removed a statue of Robert E. Lee.
- Florida
  - Fort Myers: The bust of Robert E. Lee, on a pedestal in the median of Monroe Street downtown, was found face down on the ground on March 12, 2019; the bolts holding it in place had been removed. It did not appear to be damaged, and was removed by the Sons of Confederate Veterans, whose defunct Laetitia Ashmore Nutt Chapter had commissioned it in 1996 from Italian sculptor Aldo Pero for $6,000. In 2018 there had been conflict over the future of the monument, both at a Ft. Myers City Council meeting and at the monument itself.
  - Hollywood: Lee Street was renamed Liberty Street in 2018. Streets in honor of Confederate heroes Nathan Bedford Forrest and John Bell Hood were also renamed.
  - Robert E. Lee High School (Fairfax County, Virginia), now John R. Lewis High School.
  - Robert E. Lee High School (Jacksonville, Florida), renamed Riverside High School in August 2021.
  - Robert E. Lee Middle School (Orlando, Florida), renamed College Park Middle School in 2017.
- Georgia:
  - In 2015, the Georgia legislature removed the name of Robert E. Lee Day; it is now known as a "State Holiday."
  - Athens: A portrait of Robert E. Lee was removed from a building on the campus of the University of Georgia by the Demosthenian Literary Society.
- Louisiana
  - Baton Rouge
    - Robert E. Lee High School, now Liberty Magnet High School.
    - Robert E. Lee Theater (Baton Rouge, Louisiana) - closed.
  - Monroe
    - Robert E. Lee Junior High School (Monroe, Louisiana), renamed Neville Junior High School.
  - New Orleans
    - Robert E. Lee Boulevard (New Orleans, Louisiana), renamed Allen Toussaint Boulevard.
    - Robert E. Lee Monument (New Orleans, Louisiana), removed in May 2017.
- Maryland
  - Baltimore
    - Robert E. Lee and Stonewall Jackson Monument (Baltimore, Maryland), removed August 16, 2017.
    - Robert E. Lee Memorial Park, renamed Lake Roland Park on 28 September 2015.
- Missouri
  - Robert E. Lee Elementary School (Columbia, Missouri), renamed Locust Street Expressive Arts Elementary School.
- Mississippi
  - Robert E. Lee Elementary School (Jackson, Mississippi), renamed Shirley Elementary School.
- New York
  - New York City (Brooklyn): The Robert E. Lee Tree historical marker was removed 16 August 2017, by the Episcopal Diocese of Long Island.
  - New York City (Bronx): The Robert E. Lee bust in the Hall of Fame for Great Americans outdoor sculpture gallery at Bronx Community College was removed on 17 August 2017, along with the statue of Stonewall Jackson.
  - General Lee Avenue (Fort Hamilton) (Brooklyn, New York) – renamed John Warren Avenue in 2022.
  - Robert E. Lee bust in the Hall of Fame for Great Americans outdoor sculpture gallery at the Bronx Community College (The Bronx, New York City), removed 17 August 2017.
- North Carolina
  - Robert E. Lee Monument (Durham, North Carolina), statue in the Duke University Chapel; installed in the 1930s in consultation with "an unnamed Vanderbilt University professor" defaced August 17, 2017; removed August 19, 2017.
- Oklahoma
  - Robert E. Lee Elementary School (Hugo, Oklahoma), renamed Hugo Elementary School.
  - Robert E. Lee Elementary School (Tulsa, Oklahoma), renamed Council Oaks Elementary School in 2018.

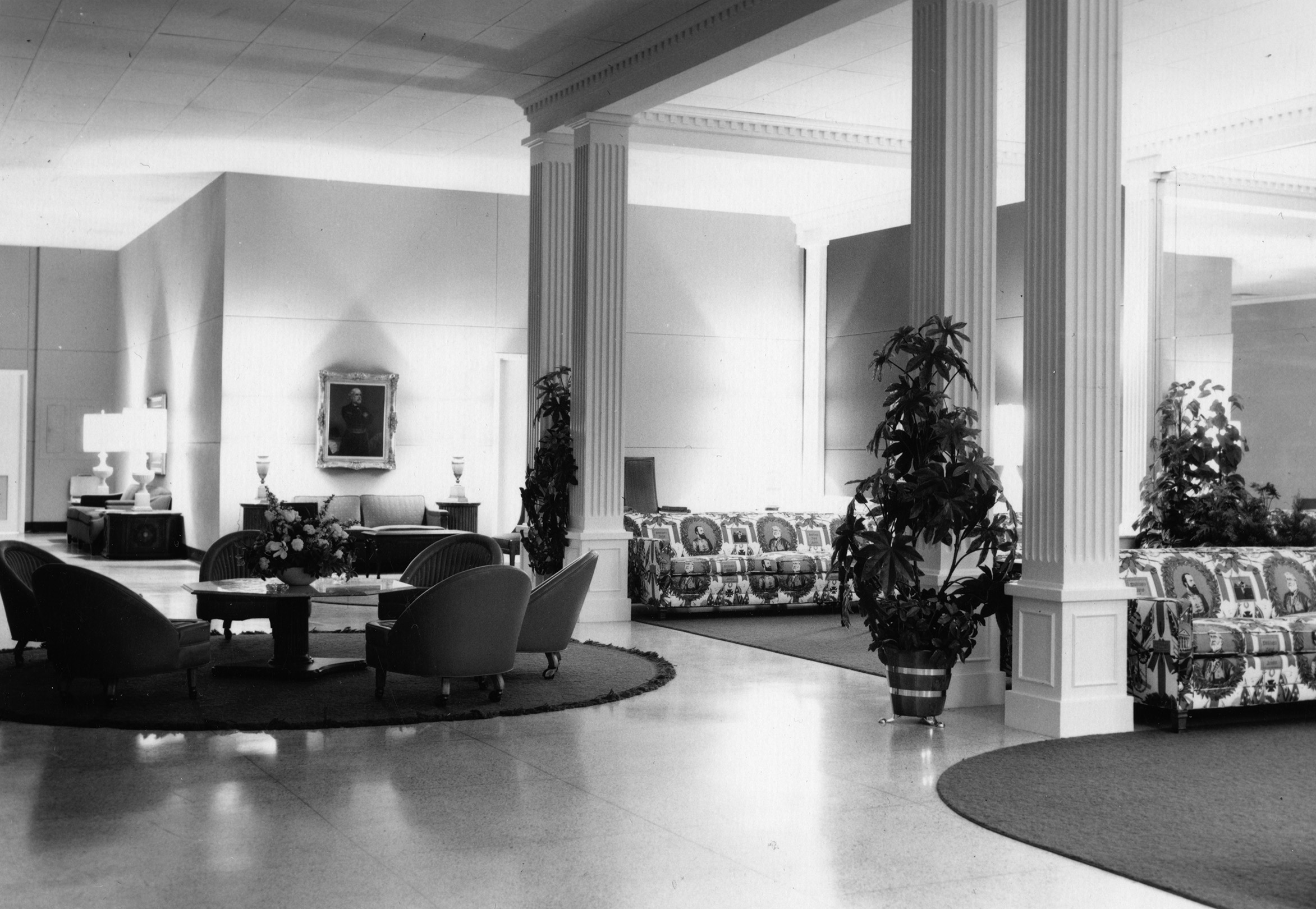
Former Robert E. Lee Suite in the Hereford University Center, Arlington State College

- Texas
  - Austin
    - Robert E. Lee Elementary School, renamed Russell Lee Elementary in 2016.
    - Robert E. Lee Road, renamed Azie Morton Road in 2019.
    - Robert E. Lee Statue, South Mall, University of Texas (Austin, Texas). Dedicated 1933. Removed August 20–21, 2017, along with statues of General Albert Sidney Johnston and Confederate Postmaster John H. Reagan. Placed in a museum.
  - Dallas
    - Robert E. Lee Elementary School, renamed Geneva Heights Elementary School beginning with the 2018–2019 school year.
    - Robert E. Lee Statue, in Robert E. Lee Park. Removed by Dallas City Council, 2018. Park was renamed Turtle Creek Park.
    - Robert E. Lee Statue, Confederate War Memorial (Dallas) removed June 2020.
  - El Paso
    - Robert E. Lee Elementary School - renamed Sunrise Mountain Elementary School in 2020.
    - Robert E. Lee Road, renamed Buffalo Soldier Road in 2020.
  - Houston
    - Robert E. Lee High School, now Margaret Long Wisdom High School.
    - Robert E. Lee Road (Houston, Texas), renamed Unison Road.
  - Midland
    - Robert E. Lee High School, renamed Legacy High School in 2020.
  - San Antonio
    - Robert E. Lee High School, renamed Legacy of Educational Excellence (LEE) High School starting in the 2018–19 school year.
  - Tyler
    - Robert E. Lee High School, renamed Tyler Legacy High School in 2020.
  - Robert E. Lee Elementary School (Abilene, Texas), renamed Robert and Sammye Stafford Elementary School
  - Robert E. Lee Elementary School (Amarillo, Texas), renamed Park Hills Elementary School
  - Robert E. Lee Elementary School (Denton, Texas), renamed Alexander Elementary School
  - Robert E. Lee Elementary School (Eagle Pass, Texas), renamed Juan N. Seguin Elementary School
  - Robert E. Lee Elementary School (Grand Prairie, Texas), renamed Delmas Morton Elementary School
  - Robert E. Lee Middle School (San Angelo, Texas), renamed Lonestar Middle School
  - Robert E. Lee Intermediate School (Gainesville, Texas), renamed Gainesville Intermediate School
- Virginia
  - Fort Lee, Virginia (1917), renamed Fort Gregg-Adams in 2023.
  - Lee Chapel (Lexington, Virginia), renamed University Chapel in 2021.
  - Lee-Davis High School (Mechanicsville, Virginia), renamed Mechanicsville High School following the George Floyd protests.
  - Lee Highway (Arlington County, VA), renamed Langston Boulevard in 2021.
  - Lee–Jackson Day, eliminated in 2020.
  - Lexington: In 2017, the name of the R. E. Lee Memorial Episcopal Church (Lexington, Virginia) was returned to its original name of Grace Episcopal Church.
  - Richmond: the equestrian statue of Lee on Monument Avenue was removed on 8 September 2021 at the direction of the state government.
  - Robert E. Lee Elementary School (Hampton, Virginia) (closed in 2010)
  - Robert E. Lee Elementary School (Richmond, Virginia), closed
  - Robert E. Lee Elementary School (Spotsylvania, Virginia), renamed Spotsylvania Elementary School in 2021.
  - Robert E. Lee High School (Staunton, Virginia) - Renamed to Staunton High School on July 1, 2019.
  - Robert E. Lee Hotel changed to The Gin in 2020 (Lexington, Virginia).
  - Robert E. Lee Monument (Richmond, Virginia), NRHP-listed (removed on 8 September 2021 at the direction of the state government).
  - Robert Edward Lee Sculpture (Charlottesville, Virginia), NRHP-listed (removed by the city in July 2021, stored in an undisclosed location until it was finally melted in October 2023).
  - Washington-Lee High School (Arlington, Virginia) – Renamed Washington-Liberty High School beginning with the 2019–20 school year.
- Washington
  - East Wenatchee: Robert E. Lee Elementary School, renamed Lee Elementary in 2018.
