= Bronte High School =

Location
- 210 South Jefferson Street; Bronte, Texas 76933; United States; 31.8855°N 100.2974°W

Information
- School type: Public high school
- School district: Bronte Independent School District
- Principal: Ginger Robbins
- Staff: 28.25 (FTE)
- Grades: PK-12
- Enrollment: 224 (2023–2024)
- Student to teacher ratio: 7.93
- Colors: Maroon & White
- Athletics conference: UIL Class A
- Mascot: Longhorn/Lady Longhorn
- Website: Bronte High School website

Bronte High School is a public high school located in Bronte, Texas (USA) and classified as a 1A school by the UIL. It is part of the Bronte Independent School District located in northeastern Coke County. For the 2021-2022 school year, the school was given an "A" by the Texas Education Agency.

== Athletics ==
The Bronte Longhorns compete in the following sports

- Basketball
- Football
- Golf
- Tennis
- Track and Field
- Volleyball

=== State titles ===
- Boys' Golf
  - 1969(B), 1975(B)
- Volleyball
  - 1976(B), 1981(1A), 1984(1A), 1987(1A), 1991(1A)
