= National Register of Historic Places listings in Coke County, Texas =

Location of Coke County in Texas

This is a list of the National Register of Historic Places listings in Coke County, Texas.

This is intended to be a complete list of properties and districts listed on the National Register of Historic Places in Coke County, Texas. There are one district and one individual property listed on the National Register in the county.

This National Park Service list is complete through NPS recent listings posted March 21, 2025.

== Current listings ==
The locations of National Register properties and districts may be seen in a mapping service provided.

	Name on the Register	Image	Date listed	Location	City or town	Description
1	Coke County Jail	Coke County Jail	December 23, 2004 (#04001395)	6th at Chadbourne; 31°53′34″N 100°29′16″W	Robert Lee	
2	Fort Chadbourne	Fort Chadbourne	April 2, 1973 (#73001962)	Off US 277 near Runnels and Coke county line 32°02′07″N 100°14′48″W	Bronte	

== See also ==
- National Register of Historic Places listings in Texas
- Recorded Texas Historic Landmarks in Coke County
