= Sanco, Texas =

- Unincorporated community
- Location within Texas Location within the United States
- Coordinates: 32°00′30″N 100°31′26″W
- Country: United States
- State: Texas
- County: Coke
- Elevation: 2,064 ft (629 m)
- Time zone: UTC-6 (Central (CST))
  - Summer (DST): UTC-5 (CDT)
- Area code: 915
- GNIS feature ID: 1379016

Sanco is an unincorporated community in Coke County, Texas, United States. According to the Handbook of Texas, the community had a population of 30 in 2000.

== Geography ==
Sanco is located east of Texas State Highway 208 on an unnamed county road, 9 mi (14 km) northwest of Robert Lee, 30 mi (48 km) southeast of Colorado City, and 47 mi (76 km) north of San Angelo in central Coke County. It is also located on Yellow Wolf Creek. Farm to Market Road 18 used to travel through the community in 1942.

== Education ==
A local meetinghouse served as the first school in 1888. Today, the community is served by the Robert Lee Independent School District.
