= Tennyson, Texas =

- Unincorporated community
- Location within the state of Texas Tennyson (the United States)
- Coordinates: 31°44′31″N 100°17′10″W
- Country: United States
- State: Texas
- County: Coke
- Elevation: 1,883 ft (574 m)
- Time zone: UTC-6 (Central (CST))
  - Summer (DST): UTC-5 (CDT)
- ZIP codes: 76953
- Area code: 325
- GNIS feature ID: 1348370

Tennyson is an unincorporated community in southeastern Coke County, Texas, United States. According to the Handbook of Texas, the community had a population of 35 in 2000.

== History ==
Englishman Samuel Sayner, who established the town in 1882, named it after the British poet Alfred, Lord Tennyson. Tennyson purchased a post office in 1894, taking over the responsibilities of the Mule Creek (later Juniper) post office. In 1910, when the Kansas City, Mexico and Orient Railway started service, just 20 people were living there. Tennyson continued to flourish and had several stores and enterprises for a while after that, but as cotton cultivation started to wane in the 1920s, Tennyson's growth ceased. In 1940, Tennyson had 50 residents; by 1980, that number had dropped to 35, despite the post office continuing to be open. The population was still reported to be 35 in 2000.

Although Tennyson is unincorporated, it has a post office, with the ZIP code of 76953.

On May 2, 2007, an F0 tornado struck Tennyson. It moved across open country and damaged some trees.

== Geography ==
Tennyson is located at the intersection of Farm to Market Road 2333 and U.S. Route 287, 10 mi (16 km) northwest of Bronte in central Coke County, near Mount Margaret.

=== Climate ===
The climate in this area is characterized by extremely variable temperature conditions, with annual means decreasing and annual ranges increasing poleward, and relatively little precipitation. According to the Köppen Climate Classification system, Tennyson has a Mid-Latitude Steppe and Desert Climate, abbreviated "Bsh" on climate maps.

== Education ==
County Line School was the settlement's first school until it was renamed Tennyson School in 1912. Today, the community is served by the Bronte Independent School District.
