= Water Valley, Texas =

Unincorporated community in Tom Green County, Texas, United States

Water Valley
- Unincorporated community
- Water Valley
- Nickname: WV
- Location within the state of Texas Water Valley (the United States)
- Coordinates: 31°40′04″N 100°43′01″W
- Country: United States
- State: Texas
- County: Tom Green
- Time zone: UTC-6 (Central (CST))
  - Summer (DST): UTC-5 (CDT)
- ZIP codes: 76958
- GNIS feature ID: 1349538
- Website: www.wvisd.net

Water Valley is an unincorporated community in Tom Green County, Texas, United States. According to the Handbook of Texas, the community had an estimated population of 120 in 2000. The community is part of the San Angelo metropolitan area.

== Geography ==
Water Valley is situated along U.S. Highway 87 in northern Tom Green County, approximately 22 miles northwest of San Angelo and 64 miles southeast of Big Spring.

=== Climate ===
Water Valley has a humid subtropical climate (Köppen Cfa) with long, hot summers and short, mild winters.

Climate data for Water Valley, Texas (1991–2020 normals, extremes 1898–present)
Month	Jan	Feb	Mar	Apr	May	Jun	Jul	Aug	Sep	Oct	Nov	Dec	Year
Record high °F (°C)	88 (31)	97 (36)	100 (38)	105 (41)	112 (44)	114 (46)	112 (44)	112 (44)	108 (42)	103 (39)	94 (34)	91 (33)	114 (46)
Mean maximum °F (°C)	79.8 (26.6)	83.8 (28.8)	89.5 (31.9)	95.1 (35.1)	100.8 (38.2)	102.6 (39.2)	103.6 (39.8)	102.9 (39.4)	98.8 (37.1)	93.9 (34.4)	85.2 (29.6)	79.3 (26.3)	106.0 (41.1)
Mean daily maximum °F (°C)	60.5 (15.8)	64.9 (18.3)	72.5 (22.5)	81.1 (27.3)	88.3 (31.3)	94.5 (34.7)	97.0 (36.1)	96.6 (35.9)	89.4 (31.9)	80.6 (27.0)	69.1 (20.6)	61.4 (16.3)	79.7 (26.5)
Daily mean °F (°C)	44.9 (7.2)	48.8 (9.3)	56.6 (13.7)	64.5 (18.1)	73.5 (23.1)	80.9 (27.2)	83.4 (28.6)	82.8 (28.2)	75.4 (24.1)	65.4 (18.6)	53.7 (12.1)	46.0 (7.8)	64.7 (18.2)
Mean daily minimum °F (°C)	29.2 (−1.6)	32.7 (0.4)	40.7 (4.8)	47.8 (8.8)	58.8 (14.9)	67.3 (19.6)	69.8 (21.0)	69.0 (20.6)	61.4 (16.3)	50.2 (10.1)	38.3 (3.5)	30.6 (−0.8)	49.6 (9.8)
Mean minimum °F (°C)	15.1 (−9.4)	17.6 (−8.0)	22.7 (−5.2)	31.0 (−0.6)	41.8 (5.4)	58.0 (14.4)	64.3 (17.9)	61.3 (16.3)	46.5 (8.1)	31.6 (−0.2)	21.3 (−5.9)	16.9 (−8.4)	11.9 (−11.2)
Record low °F (°C)	−7 (−22)	−3 (−19)	5 (−15)	19 (−7)	28 (−2)	42 (6)	52 (11)	51 (11)	33 (1)	18 (−8)	6 (−14)	−4 (−20)	−7 (−22)
Average precipitation inches (mm)	0.90 (23)	1.03 (26)	1.41 (36)	1.20 (30)	2.71 (69)	2.76 (70)	1.66 (42)	2.35 (60)	2.58 (66)	2.40 (61)	1.37 (35)	0.86 (22)	21.23 (539)
Average snowfall inches (cm)	0.8 (2.0)	0.1 (0.25)	0.0 (0.0)	0.2 (0.51)	0.0 (0.0)	0.0 (0.0)	0.0 (0.0)	0.0 (0.0)	0.0 (0.0)	0.0 (0.0)	0.5 (1.3)	0.2 (0.51)	1.8 (4.6)
Average precipitation days (≥ 0.01 in)	2.8	2.9	3.9	3.5	5.7	5.4	4.2	5.4	4.9	4.9	3.4	2.8	49.8
Average snowy days (≥ 0.1 in)	0.4	0.1	0.0	0.1	0.0	0.0	0.0	0.0	0.0	0.0	0.2	0.3	1.1
Source: NOAAIEM

== History ==
Among the early settlers was Captain William Turner, who arrived circa 1878. He established the Whitbarrow Ranch and built a stone house that later served as a rest home for soldiers during World War II. The community was founded by two men known as Phelin and Glynn. They dammed the North Concho River and dug an irrigation ditch that opened up the area to settlers, most of whom were English immigrants. From 1885 to 1888, the local post office was known as Yandell, Argenta, or Stella. It was known as Rethaville, Mayes Store, or Mayesville from 1888 to 1889. The community was renamed Water Valley in 1889. By 1914, Water Valley had a population of 175, a general store, a gin, and two cotton buyers. Around the same time, the Water Valley Independent School District was formed. The number of residents stood at 140 in 1940. That figure peaked at 180 in the mid-1950s, before declining to approximately 120 during the later half of the 20th century.

Although Water Valley is unincorporated, it has a post office, with the ZIP code of 76958.

== Education ==
Public education in Water Valley is provided by the Water Valley Independent School District. The district covers northwestern Tom Green and southwestern Coke Counties. Water Valley High School fields teams in basketball, football, volleyball, and tennis. The Pride of Water Valley Band and FFA chapter are also staples in the community.
