= Robert E. Lee Monument (Marianna, Arkansas) =

- Robert E. Lee Monument; Marianna Confederate Monument
- U.S. National Register of Historic Places
- U.S. Historic district – Contributing property
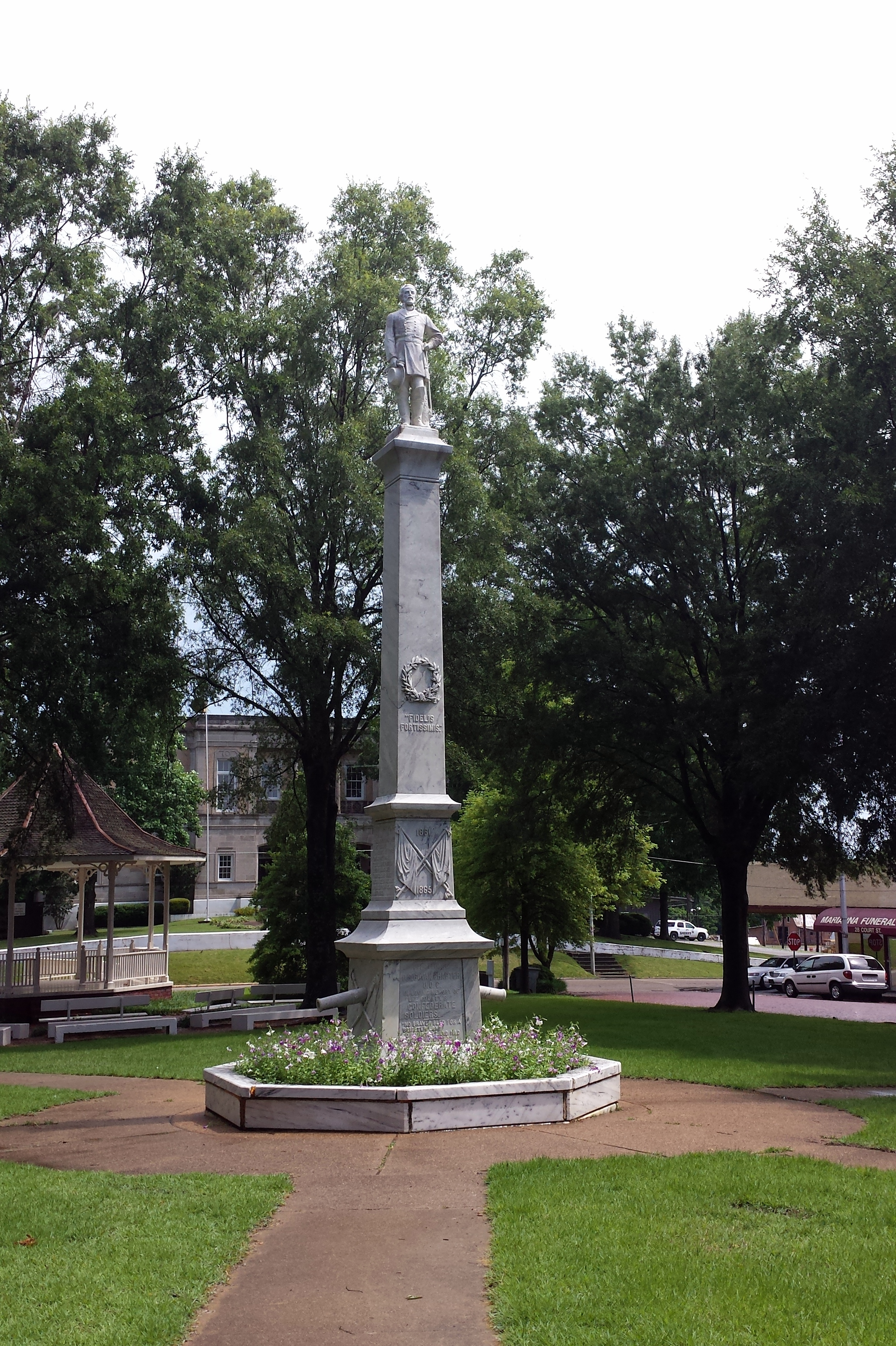
- Main façade of Robert E. Lee Monument, 2014

- Location within Arkansas Location within the United States
- Location: City Park, roughly bounded by Court, Chestnut, and Main Sts., Marianna, Arkansas
- Coordinates: 34°46′26″N 90°45′25″W
- Area: less than one acre
- Built: 1910
- Built by: McNeel Marble Co.
- Architectural style: Neoclassical
- Part of: Marianna Commercial Historic District (ID00001559)
- MPS: Civil War Commemorative Sculpture MPS
- NRHP reference No.: 96000450

Significant dates
- Added to NRHP: May 10, 1996
- Designated CP: January 4, 2001

The Robert E. Lee Monument (also known as the Marianna Confederate Monument) is a U. D. C. memorial built to honor Lee County's Confederate veterans. The monument was carved by the McNeel Marble Co. It is located in Marianna, Arkansas, across from the Lee County Courthouse. Dedicated in 1910, it is one of several monuments built to honor Confederate soldiers. The structure is a local tourist attraction and, since 1996, has been listed in the National Register of Historic Places.

== Description ==
Made entirely of marble, the Marianna Confederate Monument consists of a statue of the General in Chief of the Armies of the Confederate States, Robert E. Lee, in dress uniform. The Lee statue is mounted on a column 20 feet (6.1 m) high, with a fountain at its base which is fed by two downward-pointing sculpted cannons. The memorial was sponsored and funded by D. C. Govan Chapter No. 781 of the U. D. C., and dedicated to the "loving memory of Lee County's Confederate soldiers."

== See also ==
- List of memorials to Robert E. Lee
- National Register of Historic Places listings in Lee County, Arkansas
