= Water Valley High School =

Water Valley High School may refer to:

- Water Valley High School (Texas)
- Water Valley High School (Mississippi)
