= Robert E. Lee Day =

State holiday in parts of the Southern US

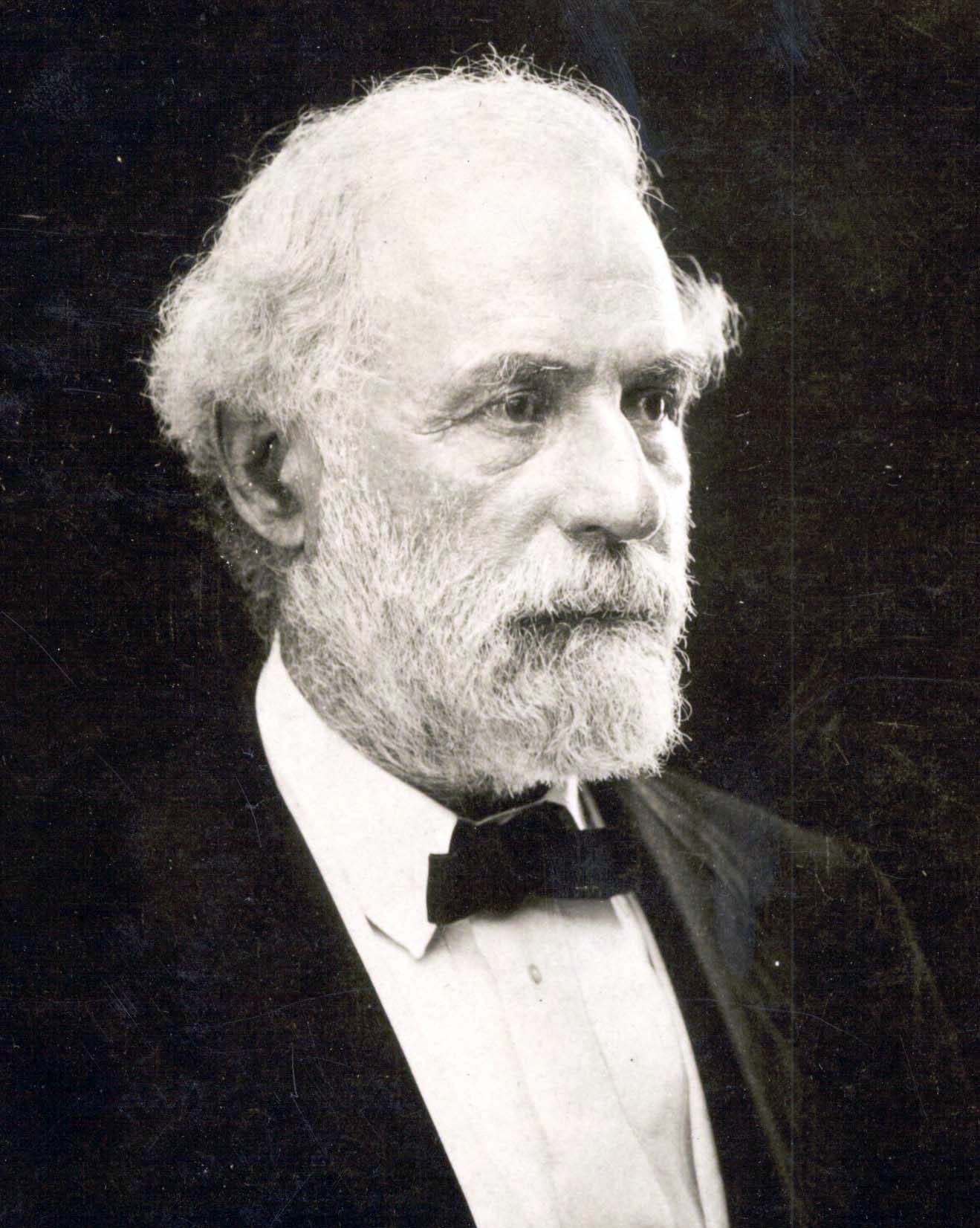
- Robert E. Lee in 1870
- Also called: Lee's Birthday
- Observed by: Alabama; Mississippi; Tennessee; Florida (on January 19)
- Type: State holiday
- Significance: Confederate General in Chief's birthday
- Date: Third Monday in January
- 2025 date: January 20
- 2026 date: January 19
- 2027 date: January 18
- 2028 date: January 17
- Frequency: Annual
- Related to: Confederate Memorial Day; Lee–Jackson Day; Lee–Jackson–King Day; Martin Luther King Jr. Day

Robert E. Lee Day is a state holiday observed on various dates in parts of the Southern US, commemorating the January 19 birthday of Confederate general Robert E. Lee. It is rooted in the Lost Cause myth prevalent throughout the Southern United States, as Lee was a central figure in Lost Cause mythology due to his social status, military exploits, and personality.

== Current observances ==
In Tennessee, January 19 (Lee's birthday) was established as a holiday in 1917. In 1969, it was changed to a "special day of observation" in the state. Since then, state law requires the governor to proclaim each January 19 "Robert E. Lee Day".

Texas made "Lee Day" a holiday in 1931. In 1973, "Lee Day" was renamed Confederate Heroes Day.

Florida Statute 683.01(d) marks January 19 as Robert E. Lee Day, although no offices or schools close down for it.

Alabama and Mississippi observe it on the third Monday in January, in order to split the date with the federal holiday Martin Luther King Jr. Day.

== Past observances ==
Arkansas combined the observance of Robert E. Lee Day with Martin Luther King Jr. Day in 1985, after two years of requiring state employees to select between the two holidays or their own birthday as a day off from work. In 2017, it passed a law removing General Lee's name from the January holiday; the law also established a state memorial day on the second Saturday of October in honor of Lee.

Virginia observed a holiday honoring Lee on January 19 from 1889 until 1904, at which time Stonewall Jackson was added to the observance and the holiday renamed Lee–Jackson Day. The combined holiday was observed on the Friday preceding the third Monday in January. In 1983, the holiday was merged with Martin Luther King Jr. Day when the latter became a federal holiday, forming Lee–Jackson–King Day. In 2020, with a Democratic governor and both houses of the state legislature controlled by Democrats, the observance of Lee–Jackson Day was abolished.

Georgia formerly called the Friday after Thanksgiving Robert E. Lee Day; now it is only an unnamed paid holiday.

== See also ==
- List of memorials to Robert E. Lee
- Removal of Confederate monuments and memorials
