= Confederate History Month =

Commemorative month in the Southern United States

Confederate History Month is a month designated by seven state governments in the Southern United States for the purpose of recognizing and honoring the Confederate States of America. April has traditionally been chosen, as Confederate Memorial Day falls during that month in many of these states. The designation of a month as Confederate History Month began in 1994.

== State declarations ==
Although Confederate Memorial Day is a holiday in most Southern states, the tradition of having a Confederate History Month is not uniform. State governments that have regularly declared Confederate History Month are as follows:

- Alabama
- Florida (since 2007)
- Georgia (by proclamation since 1995, by legislative authority since 2009)
- Louisiana
- Mississippi
- Texas (since 1999)
- Virginia (1994–2002, 2010)

Only Mississippi has officially declared April Confederate Heritage Month in 2022, 2023, and 2024.

In 2022, four states: Alabama and Mississippi (April 25), North Carolina and South Carolina (May 10) celebrated Confederate Memorial Day.

== Controversy ==
The Confederacy lost the Civil War, which occurred when the Southern states seceded from the United States in order to defend the institution of slavery, which fueled the mainly agricultural economies of those states. Confederate History Month and Confederate Memorial Day are thus highly controversial as they are linked to a war, secession, and anti-Black racism.

When Virginia Governor Bob McDonnell issued a proclamation resurrecting Confederate History Month in 2010, controversy arose due to the proclamation's omission of slavery. McDonnell later announced, "The proclamation issued by this Office designating April as Confederate History Month contained a major omission. The failure to include any reference to slavery was a mistake, and for that I apologize to any fellow Virginian who has been offended or disappointed. The abomination of slavery divided our nation, deprived people of their God-given inalienable rights, and led to the Civil War. Slavery was an evil, vicious and inhumane practice which degraded human beings to property, and it has left a stain on the soul of this state and nation." McDonnell has indicated that he will not issue a proclamation in future years. In 2007, the Virginia General Assembly approved a formal statement of "profound regret" for the Commonwealth's history of slavery.

On April 11, 2010, Mississippi Governor Haley Barbour defended McDonnell on CNN's State of the Union, calling the controversy raised by McDonnell's proclamation "just a nit". "It's trying to make a big deal out of something that doesn't matter for diddly," Barbour said. Unlike the Virginia proclamation, the 2010 Alabama proclamation noted, "our recognition of Confederate history also recognizes that slavery was one of the causes of the war, an issue in the war, was ended by the war and slavery is hereby condemned."

== See also ==
- Lee-Jackson Day
- Robert E. Lee Day
