= Edith, Texas =

Ghost town in Coke County, Texas, USA

Coordinates: 31°54′13″N 100°36′38″W

Edith is a ghost town in Coke County, Texas, United States, eight miles west of Robert Lee on Highway 158. The estimated 25 residents left by the 1970s.
