= Water Valley Independent School District =

School district in Texas

Coordinates: 31°40′4″N 100°43′7″W

Water Valley Independent School District is a public school district based in the community of Water Valley, Texas, United States.

Located in western Tom Green County, the district extends into a portion of southwest Coke County.

== Academic achievement ==
In 2009, the school district was rated "exemplary" by the Texas Education Agency.

== Schools ==
- Water Valley High School (grades 7-12)
- Water Valley Elementary (grades PK-6)

== Athletics ==
Water Valley High School plays eleven-man football.

== See also ==
- List of school districts in Texas
