= Robert Lee High School =

Location
- 1323 Hamilton Street; Robert Lee, Texas 76945-9501; United States; 31.901567°N 100.486266°W

Information
- School type: Public high school
- School district: Robert Lee Independent School District
- Principal: David O'Dell
- Staff: 25.30 (FTE)
- Grades: 7-12
- Enrollment: 256 (2023–2024)
- Student to teacher ratio: 10.12
- Colors: Black & Orange
- Athletics conference: UIL Class A
- Mascot: Steers/Dogies
- Website: Robert Lee High School website

Robert Lee High School is a public high school located in Robert Lee, Texas (USA) and classified as a 1A school by the UIL. It is part of the Robert Lee Independent School District located in northwestern Coke County. For the 2021-2022 school year, the school was given a "B" by the Texas Education Agency.

== Athletics ==
The Robert Lee Steers compete in these UIL 1A sports:

- Basketball
- Cross country running
- Six-man football
- Golf
- Tennis
- Track and field

=== State titles ===
- Girls' basketball 1978
- Boys' golf 1990, 1991, 1992, 2008, 2009, 2010, 2011
- Girls' golf 1994

== Notable alumni ==
- Winnie Baze, American football player
