= Winnie Baze =

American football player (1914–2006)

No. 26
- Position: Back

Personal information
- Born: July 14, 1914; Robert Lee, Texas, U.S.
- Died: December 30, 2006 (aged 92)
- Listed height: 5 ft 11 in (1.80 m)
- Listed weight: 190 lb (86 kg)

Career information
- High school: Robert Lee (Texas)
- College: Texas Tech
- NFL draft: 1936: undrafted

Career history
- Philadelphia Eagles (1937)
- Stats at Pro Football Reference

Winford Eason Baze (July 14, 1914 – December 30, 2006) was an American professional football back who played one season with the Philadelphia Eagles of the National Football League (NFL). He played college football at Schreiner Institute and Texas Technological College.

== Early life and college ==
Winford Eason Baze was born on July 14, 1914, in Robert Lee, Texas. He attended Robert Lee High School in Robert Lee.

Baze first played college football at Schreiner Institute from 1932 to 1933. He was then a two-year letterman for the Texas Tech Matadors of Texas Technological College from 1934 to 1935.

== Professional career ==
Baze played in ten games, starting four, for the Philadelphia Eagles in 1934, recording three rushes for 14 yards, one reception for two yards, and three incomplete passes. He wore jersey number 26 while with the Eagles. He stood 5'11" and weighed 190 pounds.

== Personal life ==
Baze served in the United States Navy. He died on December 30, 2006, in Tyler, Texas.
