= Lee–Jackson Day =

Former holiday in the Commonwealth of Virginia

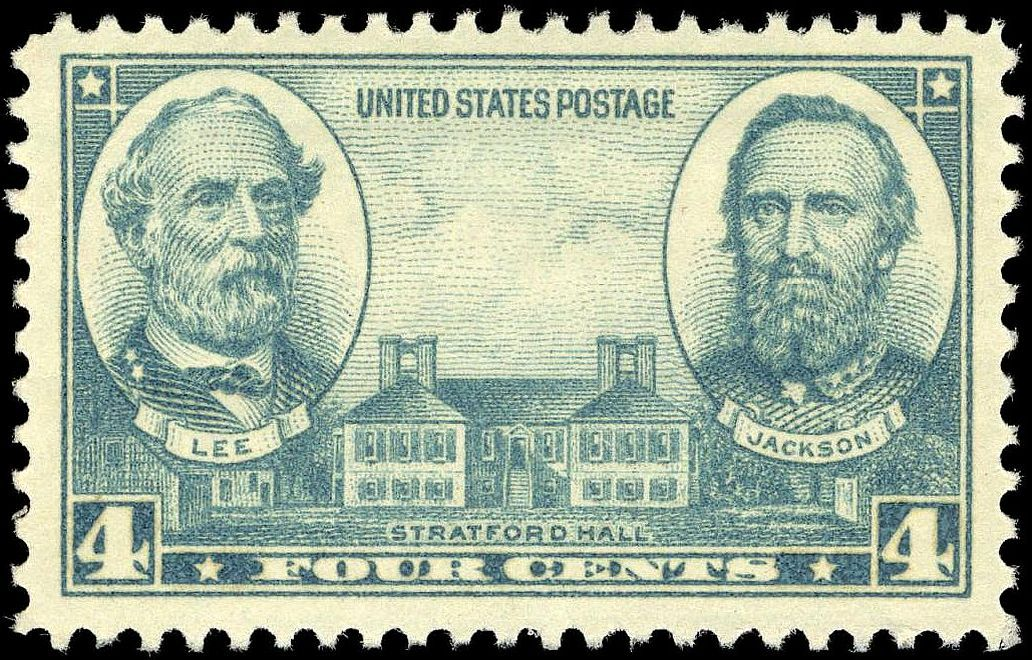
- 1937 U.S. postage stamp featuring Lee, Jackson, and Stratford Hall
- Observed by: Virginia
- Type: Historical, cultural, ethnic
- Significance: Southern history
- Date: January 15-16
- Frequency: Annual
- First time: 1889
- Last time: 2020
- Related to: Lee–Jackson–King Day; Martin Luther King Jr. Day; Election Day

Lee–Jackson Day was a state holiday in the U.S. Commonwealth of Virginia, commemorating Confederate commanders, Robert E. Lee and Stonewall Jackson. Its observation was eliminated in 2020, replaced by Election Day as a state holiday.

== Origin and name changes ==
The holiday was first created in 1889 during the administration of Gov. Fitzhugh Lee, a former Confederate cavalry officer and nephew of Gen. Lee. The original holiday was on Lee's birthday (January 19) until 1904, which brought the addition of Jackson's name and birthday (January 21). The original intent of Lee-Jackson day was to celebrate Confederate Generals Lee and Jackson, who had fought for their state of Virginia during the American Civil War.

In 1983, the holiday was merged with the then-new federal holiday Martin Luther King, Jr. Day, as Lee–Jackson–King Day in Virginia; the merger was reversed in 2000 by Governor Jim Gilmore.

== Observation ==
Lee–Jackson Day was observed on the Friday immediately preceding Martin Luther King Jr. Day (the third Monday in January). Typical events included a wreath-laying ceremony with military honors, a Civil War themed parade, symposia, and a gala ball. State offices were closed for both holidays.

During the 2010s, various Virginia municipalities chose not to observe Lee–Jackson Day, including Charlottesville, Fairfax, Fredericksburg, Hampton, Newport News, Richmond, Winchester, and the Town of Blacksburg.

== Elimination ==
In early 2020 the newly elected Democratic Virginia General Assembly proposed ending the observance and designating Election Day as a replacement holiday. The Senate of Virginia voted in January to eliminate Lee–Jackson Day as a state holiday; the legislation was passed a month later by the House of Delegates. Governor Ralph Northam approved the bill in March, to take effect in July.

== See also ==
- Confederate History Month
- Southern United States
- Robert E. Lee Day
