= Bronte Independent School District =

School district in Texas

Address
- 210 S Jefferson Bronte, Texas, 76933-0670; United States

District information
- Type: Public
- Grades: PK–12
- Superintendent: Tim Siler
- Governing agency: Texas Education Agency
- Schools: 1
- NCES District ID: 4811490

Students and staff
- Enrollment: 235 (2022–2023)
- Teachers: 28.42 (on an FTE basis)
- Student–teacher ratio: 8.27

Other information
- Website: www.bronteisd.net

Bronte Independent School District is a public school district based in Bronte, Texas (USA).

Located in Coke County, a portion of the district extends into Runnels County.

Bronte ISD has two campuses - Bronte High School (Grades 7-12) and Bronte Elementary School (Grades PK-6).

For the 2021-2022 school year, the school district was given an "A" by the Texas Education Agency.

The district provided educational services for the inmates at Coke County Juvenile Justice Center, a juvenile detention center operated by the GEO Group and contracted by the Texas Youth Commission. As of 2007, 21 district employees were based at the center. During that year, Alan Richey, the superintendent of Bronte ISD, estimated that 40% of the enrollment in the school district consisted of children who were incarcerated in the center. The superintendent said that the district lost $2 million in funding as a result of the closure of the juvenile facility, which occurred during that year.
