= Robert Lee Independent School District =

School district in Texas

Coordinates: 31.9012°N 100.4861°W

Address
- 1323 Hamilton St Robert Lee, Texas, 76945-9501; United States

District information
- Type: Public
- Grades: PK–12
- Superintendent: Aaron Hood
- Governing agency: Texas Education Agency
- Schools: 1
- NCES District ID: 4837380

Students and staff
- Enrollment: 276 (2022–2023)
- Teachers: 24.37 (on an FTE basis)
- Student–teacher ratio: 11.33

Other information
- Website: www.rlisd.net

Robert Lee Independent School District is a public school district based in Robert Lee, Texas, US that covers much of western Coke County.

== Academic achievement ==
For the 2021-2022 school year, the school district was given a "B" by the Texas Education Agency.

== Schools ==
The district has two campuses -

- Robert Lee Junior High/High School (Grades 7-12)
- Robert Lee Elementary School (Grades PK-6)

== Special programs ==
=== Athletics ===
Robert Lee High School plays six-man football.

== Controversy ==
In July 2024, the ACLU of Texas sent Robert Lee Independent School District a letter, alleging that the district's 2023-2024 dress and grooming code appeared to violate the Texas CROWN Act, a state law which prohibits racial discrimination based on hair texture or styles, and asking the district to revise its policies for the 2024-2025 school year.

== See also ==
- List of school districts in Texas
