= Lee–Jackson–King Day =

Holiday celebrated in Virginia, U.S. from 1984 to 2000

Lee-Jackson-King Day
- Observed by: Virginia
- Type: Historical, cultural, ethnic
- Significance: Southern History
- Date: Same day as Martin Luther King Jr. Day
- Frequency: annual
- First time: 1984
- Last time: 2000
- Related to: Lee–Jackson Day; Martin Luther King Jr. Day; Election Day

Lee–Jackson–King Day was a holiday celebrated in the Commonwealth of Virginia from 1984 to 2000 as a combination of Lee–Jackson Day and Martin Luther King Jr. Day. From 2000 to 2020, the state observed them as two distinct holidays. In 2020, Lee-Jackson Day was eliminated entirely.

Robert E. Lee's birthday (January 19, 1807) had been celebrated as a Virginia holiday since 1889. In 1904, the legislature added the birthday of Thomas J. "Stonewall" Jackson (January 21, 1824) to the holiday, and Lee–Jackson Day was born.

In 1983, the United States Congress declared January 15 to be a national holiday in honor of civil rights leader Martin Luther King Jr. Since 1978, Virginia had celebrated King's birthday in conjunction with New Year's Day. To align with the federal holiday, the Virginia legislature combined King's celebration with the existing Lee–Jackson holiday, in tribute to "defenders of causes".

In 2000, Virginia Governor Jim Gilmore proposed splitting Lee–Jackson–King Day into two separate holidays after debate arose over whether the nature of the holiday which simultaneously celebrated the lives of two Confederate generals who fought to defend slavery and a civil rights icon was incongruous. The measure was approved and Lee–Jackson Day and Martin Luther King Jr. Day were celebrated separately, with Martin Luther King Jr. Day on the third Monday in January and Lee–Jackson Day three days earlier on the preceding Friday. The Lee–Jackson holiday was itself eliminated in 2020.

== See also ==
- Monument Avenue, a Richmond avenue which had monuments to Confederate leaders and Arthur Ashe from 1996 to 2021
