= Water Valley High School (Texas) =

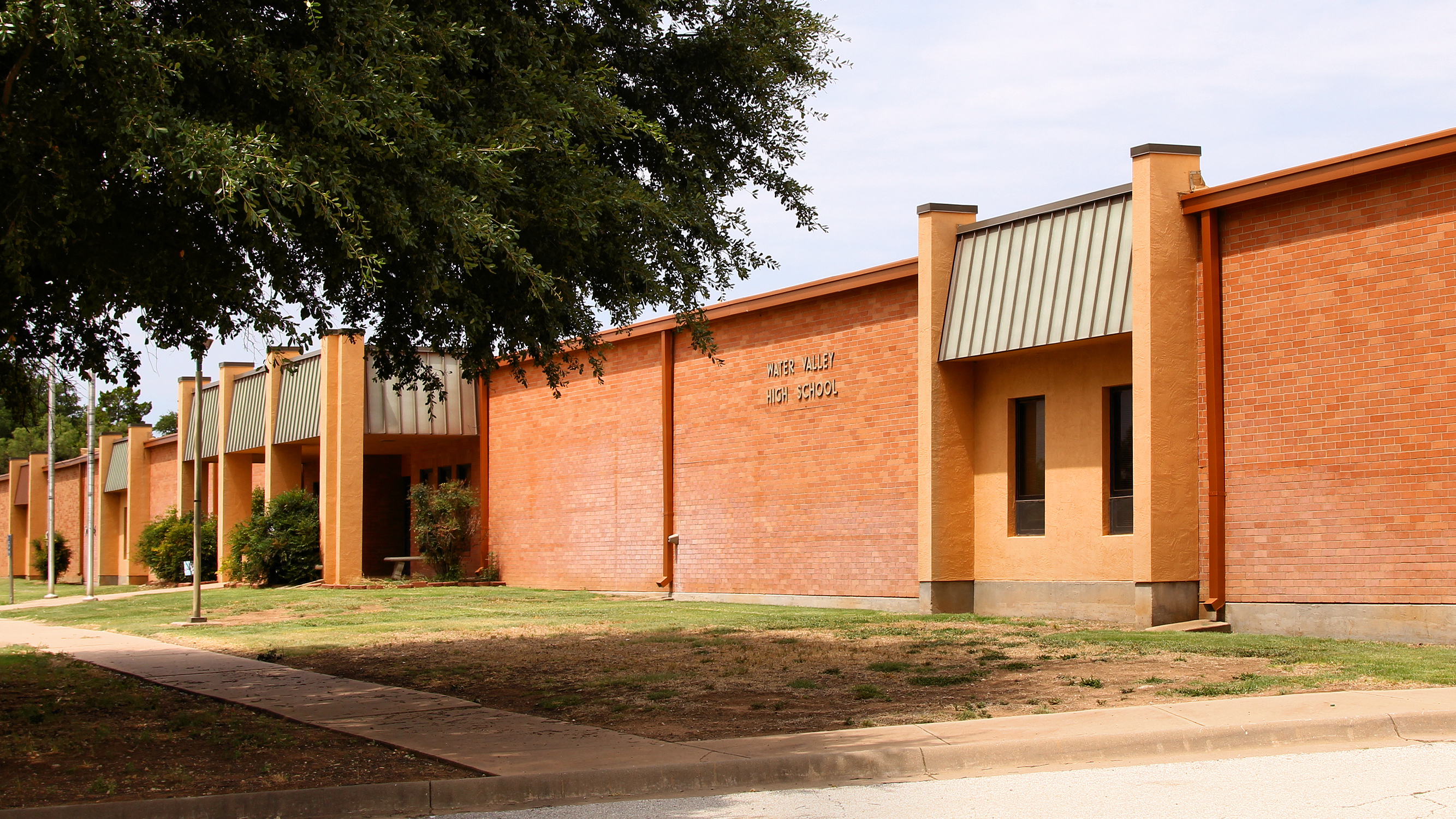

Location
- 17886 Wildcat Drive; Water Valley, Texas 76958-9998; United States; 31.667693°N 100.717694°W

Information
- Type: Public high school
- School district: Water Valley Independent School District
- Principal: Dean Hoover
- Teaching staff: 36.61 (FTE)
- Grades: 7-12
- Enrollment: 307 (2023-2024)
- Student to teacher ratio: 8.39
- Colors: Black & white
- Athletics conference: UIL Class AA
- Mascot: Wildcat
- Yearbook: The Wildcat
- Website: Water Valley High School

Water Valley High School is a public high school located in the community of Water Valley, Texas, in Tom Green County, United States. It is classified as a 2A school by the UIL. It serves the communities of Water Valley and Carlsbad, and the surrounding rural areas. In 2015, the school was rated "met standard" by the Texas Education Agency.

== Athletics ==
The Water Valley Wildcats compete in these sports:

- Basketball
- Cross country
- Six-man football
- Tennis
- Track and field
- Volleyball

=== State titles ===
- Volleyball - 1986 (1A), 2011 (1A)
- Boys Basketball - 2014 (1A/D2)
- Boys' track - 2015 (1A), 2016 (1A)

==== State finalist ====
- Volleyball
  - 2025(1A)
