= Coke County, Texas =

County in Texas, United States

- County
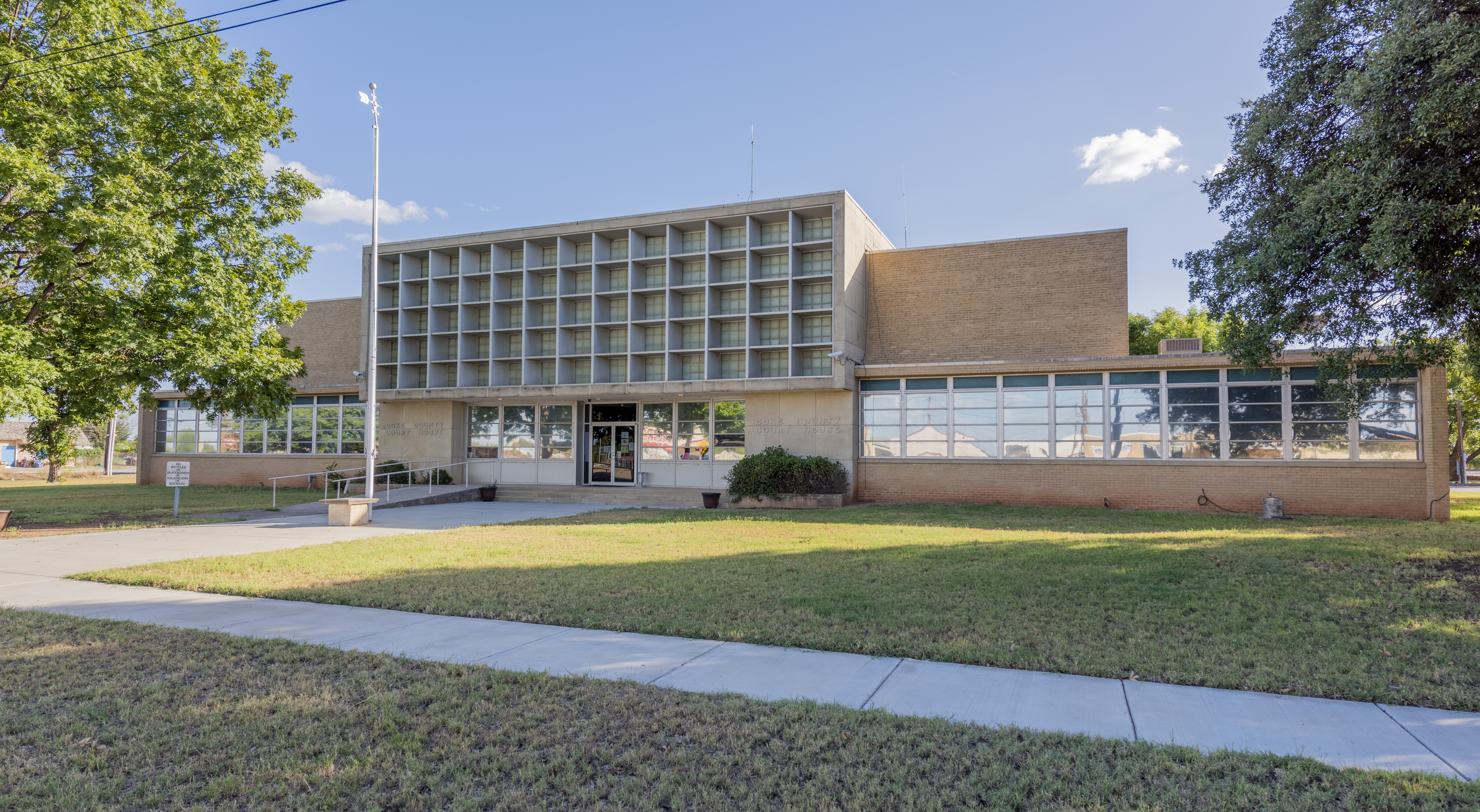
- The Coke County Courthouse in Robert Lee

- Location within the U.S. state of Texas
- Coordinates: 31°53′N 100°32′W
- Country: United States
- State: Texas
- Founded: March 13, 1889
- Named for: Richard Coke
- Seat: Robert Lee
- Largest city: Robert Lee

Area
  - Total: 928 sq mi (2,400 km^{2})
  - Land: 911 sq mi (2,360 km^{2})
  - Water: 17 sq mi (44 km^{2}) 1.8%

Population (2020)
  - Total: 3,285
  - Estimate (2025): 3,412 ▲
  - Density: 3.61/sq mi (1.39/km^{2})
- Time zone: UTC−6 (Central)
  - Summer (DST): UTC−5 (CDT)
- Congressional district: 11th
- Website: www.co.coke.tx.us

Coke County is a county located on the Edwards Plateau in the U.S. state of Texas. As of the 2020 census, its population was 3,285. Its county seat is Robert Lee. The county was founded in 1889 and is named for Richard Coke, the 15th governor of Texas and later a U.S. senator. Coke County was one of 46 prohibition, or entirely dry, counties in Texas, but passed a law allowing the sale of beer and wine in 2005.

== History ==
=== Native Americans ===
From about 1700 to the 1870s, Comanche, Tonkawa, Lipan Apache, Kickapoo, and Kiowa roamed the county. These tribes settled in rock shelters in the river and creek valleys, leaving behind artifacts and caches of seeds, implements, burial sites, petroglyphs, river shells, turkey and deer bones, and flint knives, scrapers, and points.

=== Early years ===
In 1851, United States Army post Fort Chadbourne was established to protect the frontier, and the fort was manned until the Civil War. The Butterfield Overland Mail ran through the area from 1858 to 1861.

Between 1860 and the early 1880s, the only settlers in what became Coke County were ranchers attracted to open grazing land. J. J. Austin established his ranch headquarters near Sanco in 1875. Pate Francher settled in the area in 1877.

In 1882, the Texas and Pacific Railway began providing service to San Angelo, and settlers started coming into the region in somewhat larger numbers.

Severe drought in the 1880s led to fence cutting and its attendant issues. State authorities eventually settled the disputes.

A few years later, the county was named after Confederate soldier, Texas governor, and U.S. senator Richard Coke.

=== County history ===
The Texas Legislature established Coke County in 1889, out of Tom Green County. The county was organized that same year, with Hayrick as county seat. The county's first newspaper, the Hayrick Democrat, began publication in 1889, but was renamed the Rustler.

In 1891 after an election, the new town of Robert Lee became the county seat. Robert E. Lee had once served at Fort Chadbourne. That same year, the county's newspaper moved to the new county seat and was renamed the Robert Lee Observer.

Dr. D.W. Key started the town of Bronte, named after English writer Charlotte Brontë. The town was originally named Oso and then Bronco. A post office was granted in 1890 after residents changed the name to Bronte.

Silver, named after Silver Peak Summit, was settled between 1870 and 1880 as a ranching hub. Early settlers were S.M. Conner, R.B. Allen, W.G. Jameson, and W.R. Walker. Dr. Joseph Eaton Reed was for 50 years the only physician. Oil discovery and related industries created a boom in Silver in the mid-20th century. After the oil camps closed down in 1966, Silver's population slipped drastically.

Tennyson, named in honor of the British poet Alfred, Lord Tennyson was established in 1892. It received a post office two years later.

The Kansas City, Mexico and Orient Railway built tracks north from San Angelo in 1907, which benefited Tennyson, Bronte, and Fort Chadbourne.

Cotton acreage peaked in 1910, but plunged sharply during the 1920s, because of a boll weevil infestation. Expanding during the same period was the production of corn, wheat, sorghum, and fruit trees. The county population declined during the Great Depression.

Oil was discovered in the county in 1942, and by 1991, 209,281,131 barrels (33,273,040.9 m^{3}) had been taken from Coke County lands. Tax money derived from oil profits helped the county to improve infrastructure and public facilities and services for its citizens. Oil production accounts for the major share of income for the county.

In 1995, Louis Jones murdered United States Army soldier Tracie Joy McBride in Coke County after having kidnapped her from Goodfellow Air Force Base in San Angelo, Texas.

== Geography ==
According to the United States Census Bureau, the county has a total area of 928 square miles (2,400 km^{2}), of which 911 square miles (2,360 km^{2}) are land and 17 square miles (44 km^{2}) (1.8%) are covered by water.

=== Major highways ===
- U.S. Highway 87
- U.S. Highway 277
- State Highway 70
- State Highway 158
- State Highway 208
- Loop 229

=== Adjacent counties ===
- Nolan County (north)
- Runnels County (east)
- Tom Green County (south)
- Sterling County (west)
- Mitchell County (northwest)

== Demographics ==
Historical population
Census	Pop.	Note	%±
1890	2,059		—
1900	3,430		66.6%
1910	6,412		86.9%
1920	4,557		−28.9%
1930	5,253		15.3%
1940	4,590		−12.6%
1950	4,045		−11.9%
1960	3,589		−11.3%
1970	3,087		−14.0%
1980	3,196		3.5%
1990	3,424		7.1%
2000	3,864		12.9%
2010	3,320		−14.1%
2020	3,285		−1.1%
2025 (est.)	3,412	▲	3.9%
U.S. Decennial Census; 1850–2010 2010 2020

=== 2020 census ===
As of the 2020 census, the county had a population of 3,285. The median age was 50.1 years, with 19.8% of residents under the age of 18 and 27.7% aged 65 or older. For every 100 females there were 96.2 males, and for every 100 females age 18 and over there were 95.4 males.

The racial makeup of the county was 82.8% White, 0.2% Black or African American, 0.9% American Indian and Alaska Native, <0.1% Asian, 0.2% Native Hawaiian and Pacific Islander, 5.3% from some other race, and 10.5% from two or more races. Hispanic or Latino residents of any race comprised 20.1% of the population.

<0.1% of residents lived in urban areas, while 100.0% lived in rural areas.

There were 1,415 households in the county, of which 24.9% had children under the age of 18 living in them. Of all households, 50.2% were married-couple households, 21.2% were households with a male householder and no spouse or partner present, and 23.7% were households with a female householder and no spouse or partner present. About 30.7% of all households were made up of individuals and 15.9% had someone living alone who was 65 years of age or older.

There were 2,130 housing units, of which 33.6% were vacant. Among occupied housing units, 79.1% were owner-occupied and 20.9% were renter-occupied. The homeowner vacancy rate was 4.2% and the rental vacancy rate was 3.2%.

=== Racial and ethnic composition ===
Coke County, Texas – Racial and ethnic composition Note: the US Census treats Hispanic/Latino as an ethnic category. This table excludes Latinos from the racial categories and assigns them to a separate category. Hispanics/Latinos may be of any race.
Race / Ethnicity (NH = Non-Hispanic)	Pop 1980	Pop 1990	Pop 2000	Pop 2010	Pop 2020	% 1980	% 1990	% 2000	% 2010	% 2020
White alone (NH)	2,764	2,977	3,079	2,651	2,473	86.48%	86.95%	79.68%	79.85%	75.28%
Black or African American alone (NH)	0	4	74	7	7	0.00%	0.12%	1.92%	0.21%	0.21%
Native American or Alaska Native alone (NH)	20	17	27	19	15	0.63%	0.50%	0.70%	0.57%	0.46%
Asian alone (NH)	14	2	3	5	1	0.44%	0.06%	0.08%	0.15%	0.03%
Native Hawaiian or Pacific Islander alone (NH)	x	x	1	1	6	x	x	0.03%	0.03%	0.18%
Other race alone (NH)	1	2	3	0	6	0.03%	0.06%	0.08%	0.00%	0.18%
Mixed race or Multiracial (NH)	x	x	24	35	116	x	x	0.62%	1.05%	3.53%
Hispanic or Latino (any race)	397	422	653	602	661	12.42%	12.32%	16.90%	18.13%	20.12%
Total	3,196	3,424	3,864	3,320	3,285	100.00%	100.00%	100.00%	100.00%	100.00%

=== 2000 census ===
At the 2000 census, 3,864 people, 1,544 households and 1,068 families resided in the county. The population density was four per square mile (2/km^{2}). The 2,843 housing units averaged three per square mile. The racial makeup of the county was 88.85% White, 1.94% Black or African American, 0.78% Native American, 0.08% Asian, 0.03% Pacific Islander, 6.94% from other races and 1.40% from two or more races. About 16.90% of the population was Hispanic or Latino of any race.

Of the 1,544 households, 27.10% had children under 18 living with them, 58.40% were married couples living together, 8.10% had a female householder with no husband present, and 30.80% were not families; 29.00% of all households was made up of individuals, and 18.30% had someone living alone who was 65 or older. The average household size was 2.31, and the average family size was 2.84.

Age distribution was 24.4% under the age of 18, 7.5% from 18 to 24, 20.5% from 25 to 44, 23.6% from 45 to 64, and 24.1% who were 65 or older. The median age was 43 years. For every 100 females, there were 100.00 males. For every 100 females 18 and over, there were 94.20 males.

The median household income was $29,085, and the median family was $36,724. Males had a median income of $30,778 versus $19,596 for females. The per capita income for the county was $16,734. About 9.70% of families and 13.00% of the population were below the poverty line, including 15.00% of those under age 18 and 12.80% of those age 65 or over.

== Communities ==
=== Cities ===
- Blackwell (mostly in Nolan County)
- Robert Lee (county seat)

=== Town ===
- Bronte

=== Unincorporated communities ===
- Sanco
- Silver
- Tennyson

=== Ghost town ===
- Edith

== Politics ==
United States presidential election results for Coke County, Texas
Year	Republican		Democratic		Third party(ies)	
Year	No.	%	No.	%	No.	%
1912	7	2.10%	301	90.39%	25	7.51%
1916	29	5.20%	484	86.74%	45	8.06%
1920	59	10.44%	444	78.58%	62	10.97%
1924	80	10.44%	673	87.86%	13	1.70%
1928	450	68.60%	206	31.40%	0	0.00%
1932	57	5.44%	983	93.89%	7	0.67%
1936	68	7.04%	888	91.93%	10	1.04%
1940	94	8.82%	967	90.71%	5	0.47%
1944	65	6.78%	824	85.92%	70	7.30%
1948	65	6.45%	909	90.18%	34	3.37%
1952	576	43.74%	736	55.88%	5	0.38%
1956	549	44.10%	690	55.42%	6	0.48%
1960	575	41.43%	799	57.56%	14	1.01%
1964	366	28.84%	900	70.92%	3	0.24%
1968	387	33.39%	563	48.58%	209	18.03%
1972	761	67.11%	358	31.57%	15	1.32%
1976	517	37.55%	844	61.29%	16	1.16%
1980	708	45.44%	838	53.79%	12	0.77%
1984	1,060	66.25%	532	33.25%	8	0.50%
1988	863	55.97%	674	43.71%	5	0.32%
1992	640	39.65%	580	35.94%	394	24.41%
1996	790	51.10%	595	38.49%	161	10.41%
2000	1,137	75.05%	355	23.43%	23	1.52%
2004	1,338	83.11%	266	16.52%	6	0.37%
2008	1,252	79.80%	299	19.06%	18	1.15%
2012	1,218	86.51%	179	12.71%	11	0.78%
2016	1,265	88.90%	140	9.84%	18	1.26%
2020	1,586	89.15%	178	10.01%	15	0.84%
2024	1,623	89.47%	179	9.87%	12	0.66%

United States Senate election results for Coke County, Texas1
Year	Republican		Democratic		Third party(ies)	
Year	No.	%	No.	%	No.	%
2024	1,567	86.86%	218	12.08%	19	1.05%

United States Senate election results for Coke County, Texas2
Year	Republican		Democratic		Third party(ies)	
Year	No.	%	No.	%	No.	%
2020	1,557	88.77%	171	9.75%	26	1.48%

Texas Gubernatorial election results for Coke County
Year	Republican		Democratic		Third party(ies)	
Year	No.	%	No.	%	No.	%
2022	1,260	90.71%	114	8.21%	15	1.08%

== Education ==
School districts include:

- Blackwell Consolidated Independent School District
- Bronte Independent School District
- Robert Lee Independent School District
- Water Valley Independent School District

All of Coke County is in the service area of Howard County Junior College District.

== See also ==
- National Register of Historic Places listings in Coke County, Texas
- Recorded Texas Historic Landmarks in Coke County
