= Bronte, Texas =

- Town
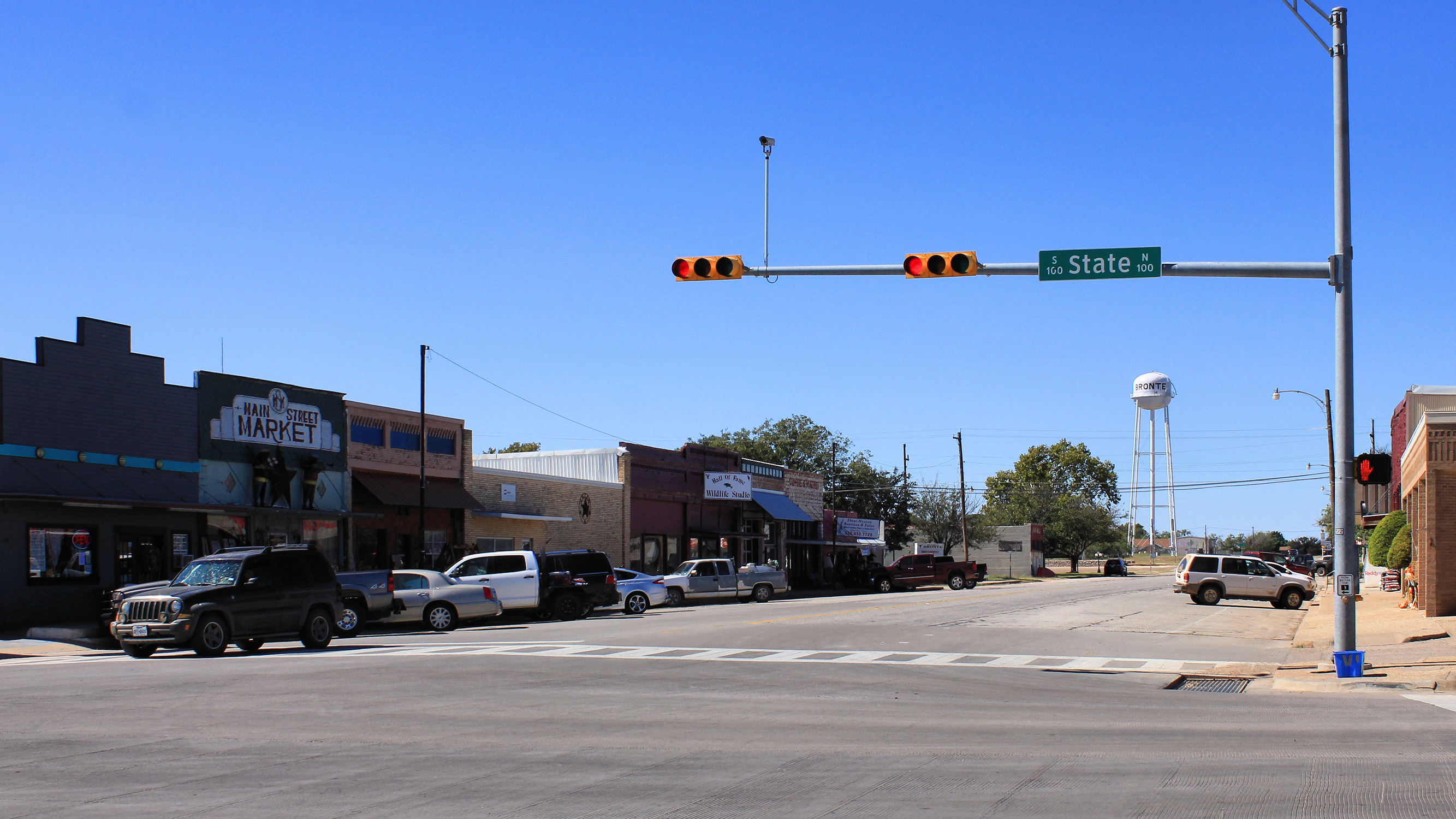
- Looking down Main Street in Bronte
- Interactive map of Bronte, Texas
- Coordinates: 31°52′48″N 100°17′39″W
- Country: United States
- State: Texas
- County: Coke

Area
  - Total: 1.44 sq mi (3.72 km^{2})
  - Land: 1.44 sq mi (3.72 km^{2})
  - Water: 0 sq mi (0.00 km^{2})
- Elevation: 1,798 ft (548 m)

Population (2020)
  - Total: 933
  - Density: 650/sq mi (251/km^{2})
- Time zone: UTC-6 (Central (CST))
  - Summer (DST): UTC-5 (CDT)
- ZIP code: 76933
- Area code: 325
- FIPS code: 48-10528
- GNIS feature ID: 2411732
- Website: www.brontetexas.org

Bronte (/ˈbrɒnt/ BRONT) is a town in Coke County, Texas, United States. Its population was 933 at the 2020 census.

== Geography ==
According to the United States Census Bureau, the town has a total area of 1.4 square miles (3.6 km^{2}), all land.

Although named for English novelist Charlotte Brontë the town name is pronounced as one syllable: "brahnt".

== Demographics ==
Historical population
| Census | Pop. | Note | %± |
|---|---|---|---|
| 1910 | 635 | | — |
| 1920 | 529 | | −16.7% |
| 1930 | 671 | | 26.8% |
| 1940 | 754 | | 12.4% |
| 1950 | 1,020 | | 35.3% |
| 1960 | 999 | | −2.1% |
| 1970 | 925 | | −7.4% |
| 1980 | 983 | | 6.3% |
| 1990 | 962 | | −2.1% |
| 2000 | 1,076 | | 11.9% |
| 2010 | 999 | | −7.2% |
| 2020 | 933 | | −6.6% |
U.S. Decennial Census

=== 2020 census ===
Bronte racial composition (NH = Non-Hispanic) (Note: Note: the US Census treats Hispanic/Latino as an ethnic category. This table excludes Latinos from the racial categories and assigns them to a separate category. Hispanics/Latinos can be of any race.)
| Race | Number | Percentage |
|---|---|---|
| White (NH) | 666 | 71.38% |
| Native American or Alaska Native (NH) | 1 | 0.11% |
| Asian (NH) | 1 | 0.11% |
| Pacific Islander (NH) | 1 | 0.11% |
| Some other race (NH) | 2 | 0.21% |
| Mixed or multiracial (NH) | 17 | 1.82% |
| Hispanic or Latino | 245 | 26.26% |
| Total | 933 | |

As of the 2020 United States census, there were 933 people, 457 households, and 327 families residing in the town.

=== 2000 census ===
As of the census of 2000, 1,076 people, 426 households, and 293 families resided in the town. The population density was 748.0 inhabitants per square mile (288.8/km^{2}). There were 502 housing units at an average density of 349.0 per square mile (134.7/km^{2}). The racial makeup of the town was 90.06% White, 0.19% Native American, 0.09% Pacific Islander, 8.55% from other races, and 1.12% from two or more races. Hispanics or Latinos of any race were 20.07% of the population.

Of the 426 households, 31.5% had children under 18 living with them, 56.3% were married couples living together, 8.9% had a female householder with no husband present, and 31.2% were not families. About 30.5% of all households were made up of individuals, and 20.2% had someone living alone who was 65 or older. The average household size was 2.42 and the average family size was 3.00.

In the town, the population was distributed as 26.9% under 18, 5.6% from 18 to 24, 21.5% from 25 to 44, 21.6% from 45 to 64, and 24.5% who were 65 or older. The median age was 41 years. For every 100 females, there were 88.1 males. For every 100 females 18 and over, there were 80.1 males.

The median income for a household in the town was $28,150, and for a family was $37,625. Males had a median income of $30,769 versus $14,135 for females. The per capita income for the town was $18,869. About 10.4% of families and 15.2% of the population were below the poverty line, including 17.4% of those under age 18 and 11.4% of those age 65 or over.

== Economy ==
As of 2007, the largest employer in Bronte was the Coke County Juvenile Justice Center, followed by the Bronte Independent School District. During that year, Gerald Sandusky, the mayor of Bronte, estimated the juvenile facility employed 180 people, and 30–35% of the juvenile center's employees lived in Coke County.

== Government and infrastructure ==
The Coke County Juvenile Justice Center, located in unincorporated Coke County, south of Bronte, was a 200-bed secure facility operated by the GEO Group (formerly Wackenhut Corrections Corp.) and contracted by the Texas Youth Commission (TYC). Originally designed for girls, it was changed into an all-boy facility in 1998. In 2007, after the TYC inspected the facility, it moved the roughly 200 youth it contracted to the center out of the Coke County facility and caused it to close. During the life of the Coke County facility, Wackenhut received criticism from the media for how it operated the center. Coke County officials criticized the closing, saying that the closing was politically motivated.

== Education ==
The town is served by the Bronte Independent School District. The district provided educational services for the inmates at Coke County Juvenile Justice Center, and 21 district employees were based at the center. During that year, Alan Richey, the superintendent of Bronte ISD, estimated 40% of the enrollment in the school district consisted of children who were incarcerated in the center. The superintendent said the district lost $2 million in funding as a result of the closure of the juvenile facility.

All of Coke County is in the service area of Howard County Junior College District.
