= General in Chief of the Armies of the Confederate States =

Military commander of the Confederate States Army (Feb–Apr 1865)

- Seal of the Confederate States (1863–1865)

- Flag of the Confederate States (1865)

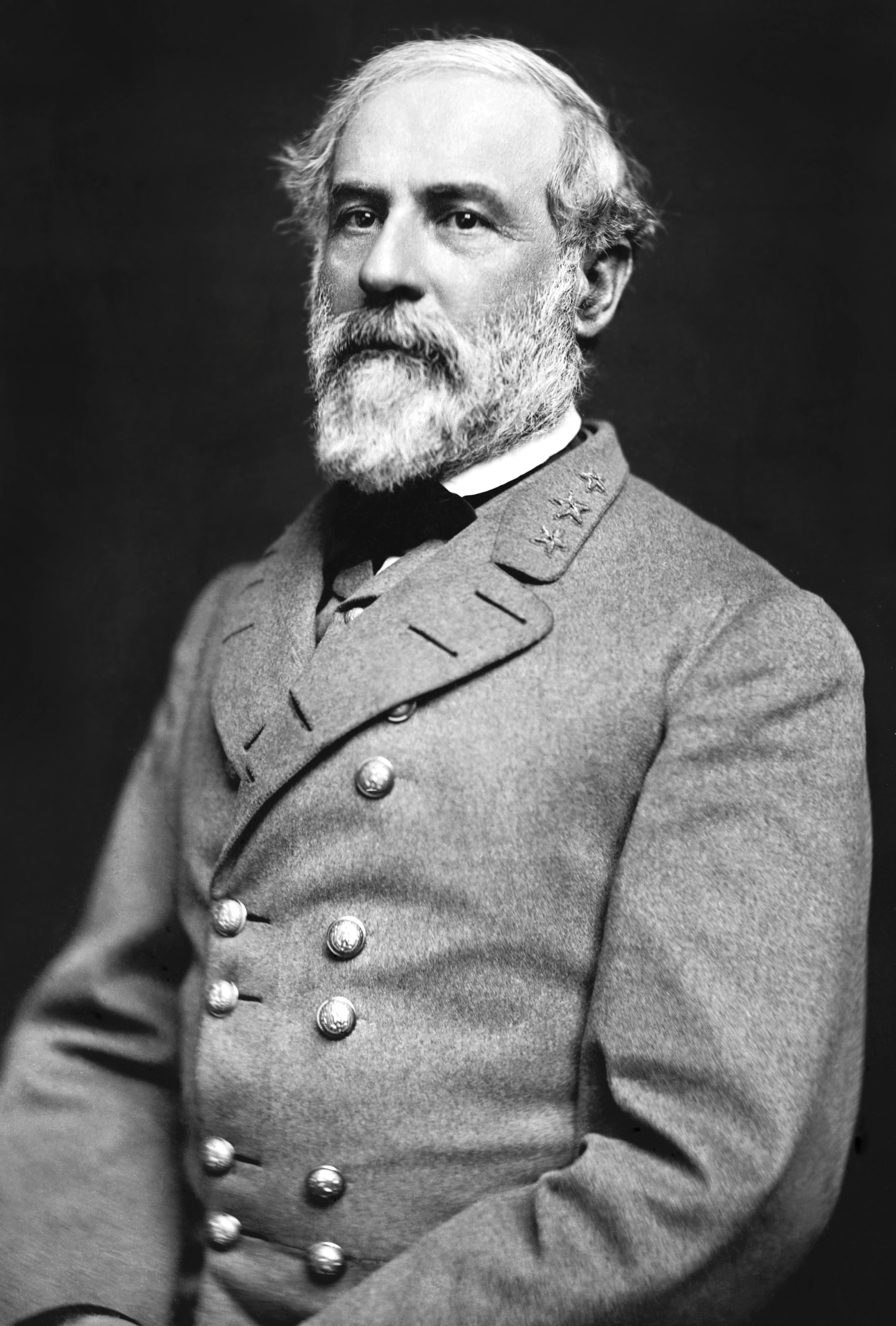
- General Robert E. Lee; February 9, 1865 – April 12, 1865
- The War Department
- Style: General
- Type: Chief of Staff
- Status: Military Chief
- Reports to: The president The secretary of war
- Appointer: The president with Senate advice and consent
- Term length: No fixed term
- Formation: January 31, 1865
- Abolished: April 9, 1865 (de facto)

The general in chief of the Armies of the Confederate States, or simply general in chief, was the military commander of the Confederate States Army (CSA) from January until April 1865. The office was effectively abolished on April 9, 1865, when General Robert E. Lee surrendered to federal forces at Appomattox, Virginia. Despite being General in Chief; the title defined a role rather than making Lee something that could be called the highest ranking Confederate general officer as the seven full generals of the Confederate States were delineated solely by seniority, topped by General Samuel Cooper.

== History ==
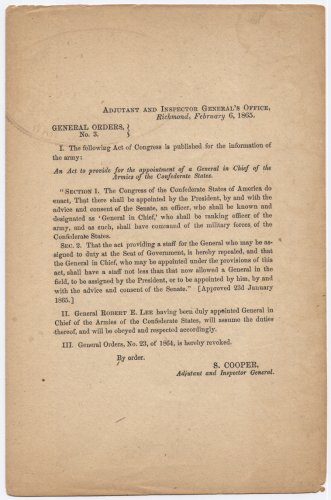
General Orders No. 3 (February 6, 1865). Issued by Adjutant General and Inspector General Samuel Cooper, the orders appointed Lee General in Chief.

On January 31, 1865, the 2nd Confederate States Congress provided "for the appointment of a General in Chief of the Armies of the Confederate States." On February 6, General Robert E. Lee was appointed to the position and served in that capacity until the end of the American Civil War. Lee retained command of the Army of Northern Virginia, serving in both assignments de facto until April 9, 1865, when he surrendered to Federal forces at Appomattox, Virginia.

The appointment of a general-in-chief had been debated as early as February 27, 1862. President Jefferson Davis voiced his rejection (and veto) of creating this position to the 1st Confederate States Congress on March 14, 1862, believing that such a general could "command an army or armies without the will of the President." Davis performed many of the responsibilities of a general in chief himself throughout the war, acting as both a military operations manager and commander-in-chief. Lee (from March to May 1862) and General Braxton Bragg (from February 1864 to January 1865) also performed related duties, as they were military advisers to Davis, or "charged with the conduct of military operations in the armies of the Confederacy."

== See also ==
- General officers in the Confederate States Army
