= Robert Lee, Texas =

City in and county seat of Coke County, Texas, United States

- City
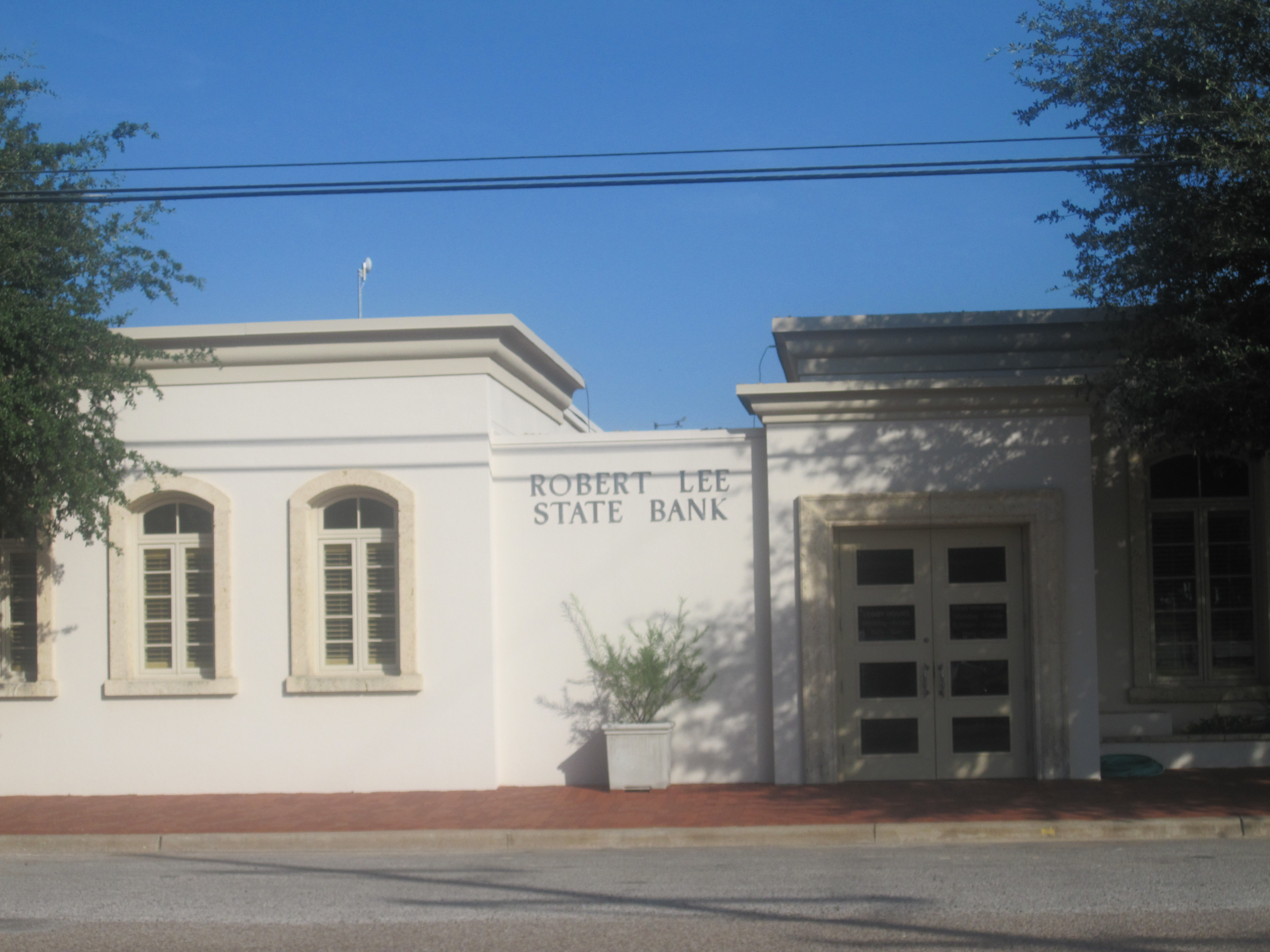
- Robert Lee State Bank

- Location within the state of Texas
- Coordinates: 31°53′44″N 100°29′08″W
- Country: United States
- State: Texas
- County: Coke

Area
  - Total: 1.15 sq mi (2.98 km^{2})
  - Land: 1.14 sq mi (2.95 km^{2})
  - Water: 0.012 sq mi (0.03 km^{2})
- Elevation: 1,831 ft (558 m)

Population (2020)
  - Total: 1,027
  - Density: 902/sq mi (348/km^{2})
- Time zone: UTC-6 (Central (CST))
  - Summer (DST): UTC-5 (CDT)
- ZIP code: 76945
- Area code: 325
- FIPS code: 48-62564
- GNIS feature ID: 2410970
- Website: www.robertleetexas.org

Robert Lee is a city in and the county seat of Coke County, Texas, United States. Its population was 1,027 at the 2020 census.

== History ==
The founders named the city after Robert E. Lee, who is thought to have set up camp for a time on the Colorado River near the current townsite. Lee served in Texas from 1856 to 1861 as a lieutenant colonel in the U.S. Army, Second Cavalry.

== Geography ==
Robert Lee is downstream from the E.V. Spence Reservoir on the upper Colorado River.

According to the United States Census Bureau, the city has a total area of 1.1 square miles (2.8 km^{2}), all land.

=== Climate ===
Robert Lee has a humid subtropical climate (Köppen Cfa) with long, hot summers and short, mild winters.

Climate data for Robert Lee, Texas (1991–2020 normals, extremes 1908–2017)
Month	Jan	Feb	Mar	Apr	May	Jun	Jul	Aug	Sep	Oct	Nov	Dec	Year
Record high °F (°C)	90 (32)	98 (37)	98 (37)	103 (39)	114 (46)	111 (44)	113 (45)	111 (44)	109 (43)	104 (40)	92 (33)	87 (31)	114 (46)
Mean maximum °F (°C)	79.3 (26.3)	83.1 (28.4)	89.8 (32.1)	95.4 (35.2)	100.4 (38.0)	102.4 (39.1)	103.6 (39.8)	102.7 (39.3)	98.5 (36.9)	93.3 (34.1)	85.5 (29.7)	78.9 (26.1)	105.9 (41.1)
Mean daily maximum °F (°C)	58.0 (14.4)	62.9 (17.2)	70.1 (21.2)	79.4 (26.3)	87.0 (30.6)	92.6 (33.7)	96.1 (35.6)	94.4 (34.7)	87.4 (30.8)	79.0 (26.1)	66.9 (19.4)	59.0 (15.0)	77.7 (25.4)
Daily mean °F (°C)	43.9 (6.6)	48.7 (9.3)	55.9 (13.3)	64.9 (18.3)	73.8 (23.2)	80.4 (26.9)	84.1 (28.9)	82.5 (28.1)	75.1 (23.9)	64.9 (18.3)	53.4 (11.9)	45.2 (7.3)	64.4 (18.0)
Mean daily minimum °F (°C)	29.8 (−1.2)	34.4 (1.3)	41.7 (5.4)	50.3 (10.2)	60.6 (15.9)	68.3 (20.2)	72.0 (22.2)	70.7 (21.5)	62.8 (17.1)	50.8 (10.4)	39.9 (4.4)	31.4 (−0.3)	51.1 (10.6)
Mean minimum °F (°C)	17.0 (−8.3)	20.2 (−6.6)	24.8 (−4.0)	34.0 (1.1)	44.0 (6.7)	59.8 (15.4)	62.5 (16.9)	62.6 (17.0)	49.4 (9.7)	35.7 (2.1)	24.2 (−4.3)	18.1 (−7.7)	13.2 (−10.4)
Record low °F (°C)	−7 (−22)	−2 (−19)	8 (−13)	24 (−4)	33 (1)	42 (6)	55 (13)	52 (11)	38 (3)	23 (−5)	6 (−14)	−2 (−19)	−7 (−22)
Average precipitation inches (mm)	1.06 (27)	1.11 (28)	1.30 (33)	1.65 (42)	2.60 (66)	2.60 (66)	1.54 (39)	2.63 (67)	2.65 (67)	2.11 (54)	1.23 (31)	0.95 (24)	21.43 (544)
Average snowfall inches (cm)	0.1 (0.25)	0.2 (0.51)	0.0 (0.0)	0.1 (0.25)	0.0 (0.0)	0.0 (0.0)	0.0 (0.0)	0.0 (0.0)	0.0 (0.0)	0.0 (0.0)	0.0 (0.0)	0.1 (0.25)	0.5 (1.3)
Average precipitation days (≥ 0.01 in)	3.5	3.5	3.9	3.4	5.1	5.0	3.9	5.8	4.3	4.2	3.8	2.9	49.3
Average snowy days (≥ 0.1 in)	0.1	0.1	0.0	0.0	0.0	0.0	0.0	0.0	0.0	0.0	0.0	0.2	0.4
Source: NOAAIEM

== Demographics ==
=== 2020 census ===
Historical population
Census	Pop.	Note	%±
1930	490		—
1940	662		35.1%
1950	1,089		64.5%
1960	990		−9.1%
1970	1,119		13.0%
1980	1,202		7.4%
1990	1,276		6.2%
2000	1,171		−8.2%
2010	1,049		−10.4%
2020	1,027		−2.1%
U.S. Decennial Census

Racial composition as of the 2020 census
Race	Number	Percent
White	841	81.9%
Black or African American	5	0.5%
American Indian and Alaska Native	14	1.4%
Asian	0	0.0%
Native Hawaiian and Other Pacific Islander	3	0.3%
Some other race	41	4.0%
Two or more races	123	12.0%
Hispanic or Latino (of any race)	276	26.9%

As of the 2020 census, Robert Lee had a population of 1,027, 433 households, and 297 families residing in the city.

The median age was 48.4 years. 21.0% of residents were under the age of 18 and 27.8% of residents were 65 years of age or older. For every 100 females there were 87.8 males, and for every 100 females age 18 and over there were 87.3 males age 18 and over.

Of the 433 households, 26.8% had children under the age of 18 living in them. Of all households, 42.7% were married-couple households, 22.2% were households with a male householder and no spouse or partner present, and 27.7% were households with a female householder and no spouse or partner present. About 31.0% of all households were made up of individuals and 15.0% had someone living alone who was 65 years of age or older.

There were 527 housing units, of which 17.8% were vacant. The homeowner vacancy rate was 6.3% and the rental vacancy rate was 0.0%.

0.0% of residents lived in urban areas, while 100.0% lived in rural areas.

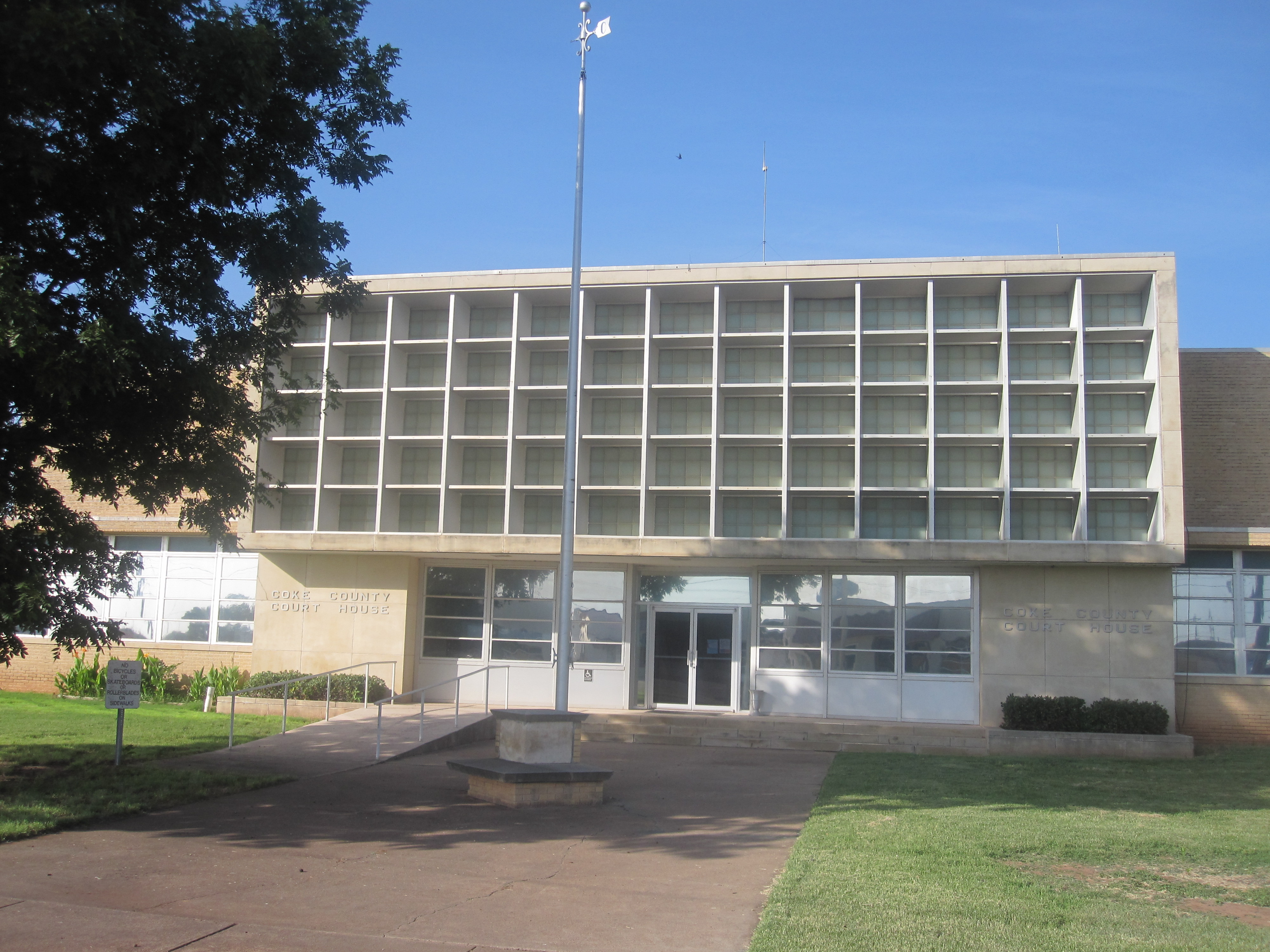
Coke County Courthouse at Robert Lee

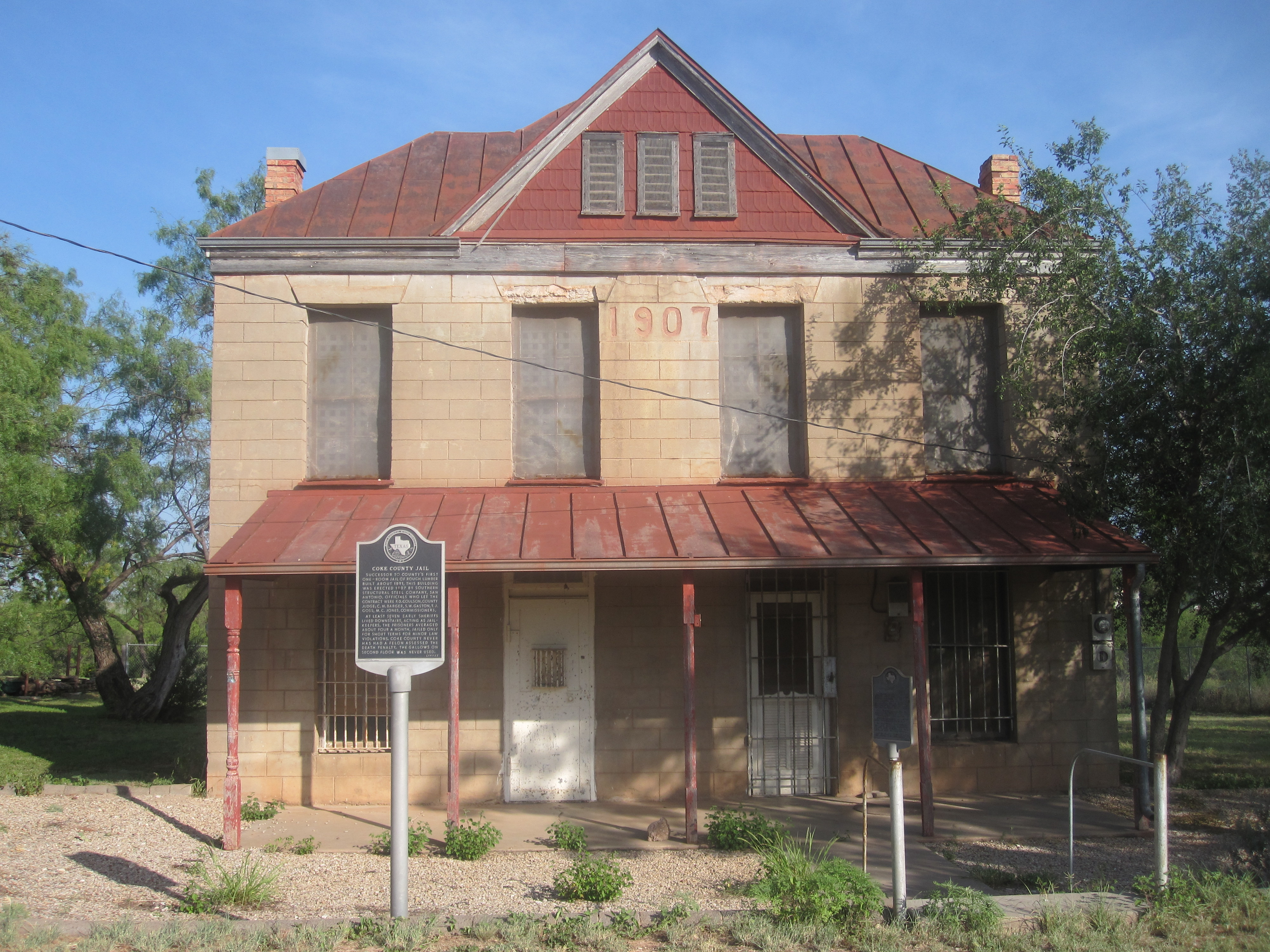
The 1907 Coke County Jail

=== 2000 census ===
As of the census of 2000, 1,171 people, 496 households, and 326 families resided in the city. The population density was 1,027 inhabitants per square mile (397/km^{2}). The 658 housing units averaged 576.9/sq mi (222.9/km^{2}). The racial makeup of the city was 89.92% White, 0.26% African American, 0.77% Native American, 0.09% Asian, 7.34% from other races, and 1.62% from two or more races. Hispanics or Latinos of any race were 19.64% of the population.

Of 496 households, 27.4% had children under 18 living with them, 52.6% were married couples living together, 11.3% had a female householder with no husband present, and 34.1% were not families. About 32.9% of all households were made up of individuals, and 21.8% had someone living alone who was 65 age or older. The average household size was 2.26 and the average family size was 2.85.

In the city, the age distribution was 22.8% under 18, 5.2% from 18 to 24, 21.1% from 25 to 44, 22.3% from 45 to 64, and 28.6% who were 65 or older. The median age was 46 years. For every 100 females, there were 81.8 males. For every 100 females age 18 and over, there were 79.4 males.

The median income for a household in the city was $25,750, and for a family was $33,553. Males had a median income of $30,486 versus $19,615 for females. The per capita income for the city was $16,672. About 12.0% of families and 14.8% of the population were below the poverty line, including 16.6% of those under age 18 and 14.5% of those age 65 or over.

== Education ==
The city is served by the Robert Lee Independent School District and is the location of Robert Lee High School.

All of Coke County is in the service area of Howard County Junior College District.

== Notable people ==
- Winnie Baze, American football player for the Philadelphia Eagles
- John Burroughs, Democratic governor of New Mexico, 1959–1960
- Wallace Clift (1926–2018), professor and author
- Dean E. Hallmark, Air Force pilot
- Fred Roe, polo player

== See also ==
- List of municipalities in Texas
