= Plain (disambiguation) =

A plain is a flat, sweeping landmass.

Plain may also refer to:

== Places ==
- Plain, Texas, U.S.
- Plain, Washington, U.S.
- Plain, Wisconsin, U.S.
- Plain City (disambiguation), several places
- Plain Township (disambiguation), several places

== Music ==
- "Plain" (song), a 2020 song by Benee

== See also ==
- Plains (disambiguation), including The Plains
- The Plain (disambiguation)
- Plaine (disambiguation)
- Plane (disambiguation)
- Plain people
