= Plane =

Plane most often refers to:

- Aero- or airplane, a powered, fixed-wing aircraft
- Plane (geometry), a flat, 2-dimensional surface
- Plane (mathematics), generalizations of a geometrical plane

Plane or planes may also refer to:

== Biology ==
- Plane (tree) or Platanus, wetland native plant
- Planes (crab), marsh crabs in Grapsidae
- Bindahara phocides, the plane butterfly of Asia

== Maritime transport ==
- Planing (boat), where weight is predominantly supported by hydrodynamic lift
- Plane (wherry), a Norfolk canal boat, in use 1931–1949

== Music ==
- "Planes", a 1976 song by Colin Blunstone
- "Planes (Experimental Aircraft)", a 1989 song by Jefferson Airplane from Jefferson Airplane
- "Planez", originally "Planes", a 2015 song by Jeremih
- "The Plane", a 1987 song on the Empire of the Sun soundtrack
- "The Plane", a 1997 song by Kinito Méndez

== Other entertainment ==
- Plane (Dungeons & Dragons), any fictional realm of the D&D roleplaying game's multiverse
- Planes (film), a 2013 animation
  - Planes: Fire & Rescue, a 2014 sequel
- Plane (film), 2023
- Plane (Magic: The Gathering), any fictional realm of the multiverse the card game is set in
- "Plane" (Not Going Out), a 2014 television episode

== People ==
- Caroline Helen Jemison Plane (1829–1925), American white supremacist

== Places ==
- Plane (Han Pijesak), Republika Srpska, Bosnia and Herzegovina
- Plane, Tuzla, Bosnia and Herzegovina
- Plane (river), eastern Germany
- Plane Island, off Cape Farina, Tunisia
- Pláně, Czech Republic
- Planès, France
- Planes, Alicante, Spain

== Religion ==
- Plane (esotericism), a state, level or region of reality
- Planē (mythology), an ancient Greek goddess

== Technology ==
- Plane (tool), for shaping wood
- Plane (Unicode), in the Universal Coded Character Set, a continuous group of 2^{16} code points
- Plane, part of a telecommunications network structure

== See also ==
- Plain (disambiguation)
- Planar (disambiguation)
- Plano (disambiguation)
- Plane sailing, an approximate method of navigation
