= Planing =

Planing may refer to:

- Planing (boat) or hydroplaning, a method by which a hull skims over the surface of the water
- Aquaplaning, a loss of traction caused by a layer of water between the tires and the road surface
- Using a plane (tool) to smooth a flat surface of a piece of wood
- Operating a planer (metalworking) to produce a flat surface
- Harmonic planing (music), chords that move in parallel motion, thereby eliminating any feeling of harmonic progression
- Scaling and root planing, the removal of dental plaque
- Planing (shaping), material removal process

== See also ==
- Planning
- Plane (disambiguation)
