= The Plain (disambiguation) =

The Plain is a name for the moderate party in the French Revolution.

The Plain may also refer to:

- The Plain (band), American 1990s rock band
- The Plain, Oxford, junction in Oxford, England
- The Plain (West Point), parade ground at United States Military Academy

== See also ==
- The Plains (disambiguation)
- Cities of the Plain (disambiguation)
