= Plain Township, Ohio =

Plain Township, Ohio may refer to:

- Plain Township, Franklin County, Ohio
- Plain Township, Stark County, Ohio
- Plain Township, Wayne County, Ohio
- Plain Township, Wood County, Ohio

== See also ==
- Plain Township (disambiguation)
