= La Plaine =

La Plaine may refer to:

- La Plaine, Dominica, a village on the eastern side of the island
- La Plaine, Geneva, a village in Dardagny Municipality, Switzerland
- La Plaine, Maine-et-Loire, a commune in western France
- La Plaine, Quebec, a small town that is now part of Terrebonne, Quebec
- La Plaine au Bois, a site of a massacre in Wormhout, Nord, France during World War II
- La Plaine-sur-Mer, a commune in the Loire-Atlantique department in western France
- The Plain, the party of moderates in revolutionary-era France.
- Gare de La Plaine-Stade de France, a station in Saint-Denis, Seine-Saint-Denis, France
- a lieu-dit in Ledringhem in northern France
- a house in St Bernard's Catholic Grammar School in Langley, Berkshire, England
- La Plaine (Dominica constituency), electoral district in Dominica

== See also ==
- Plaine (disambiguation)
