= SBB Bem 550 =

Electric multiple unit train used in Switzerland 1994–2014

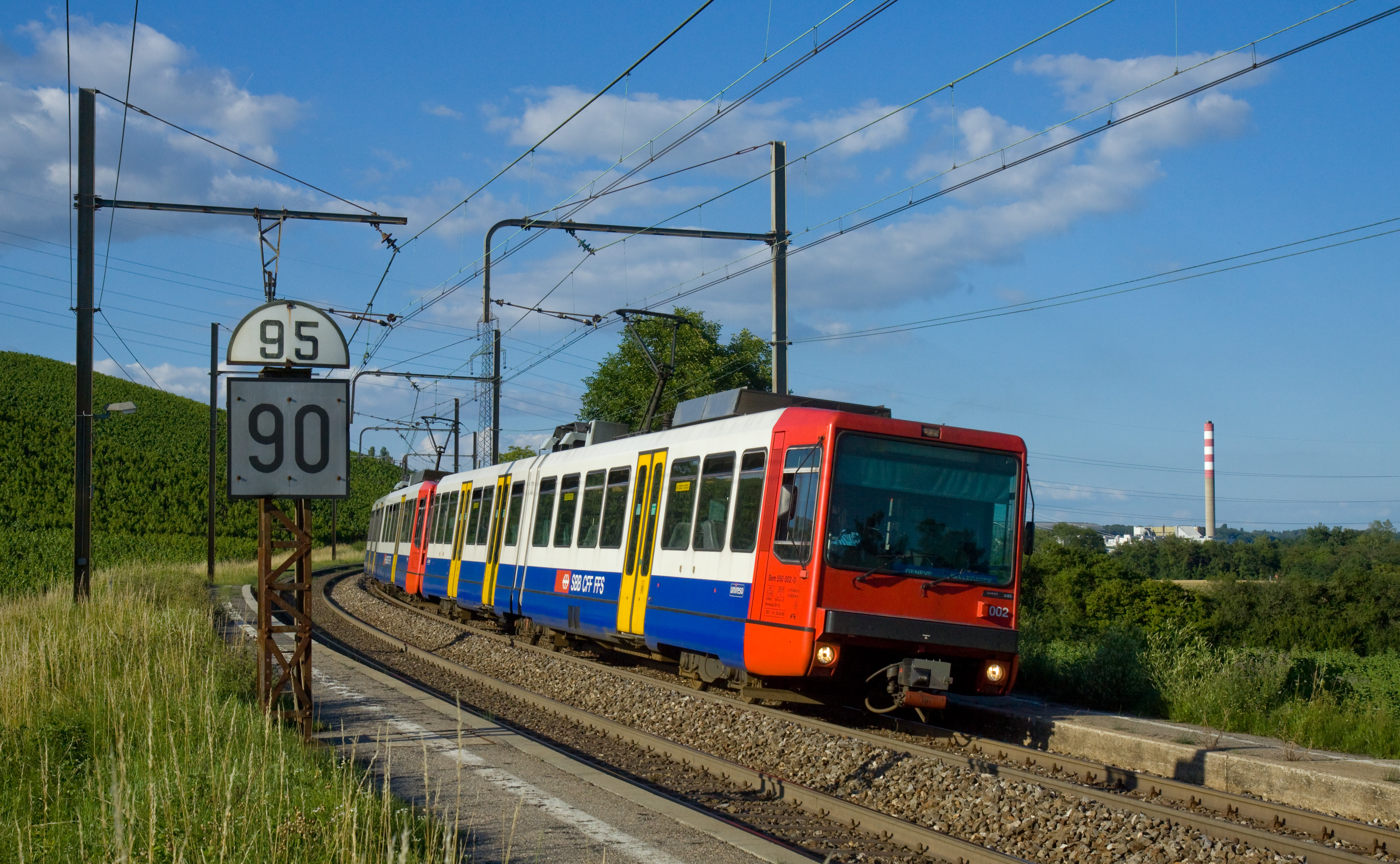
- Bem 550 at Russin heading for Bellegarde, 2011
- Stock type: Electric multiple unit
- In service: 1994–2014
- Manufacturer: ACMV
- Built at: Villeneuve, Vaud
- Replaced: BDe 4/4^{II}
- Constructed: 1994
- Number built: 5
- Fleet numbers: 000-004
- Capacity: 79
- Operator: Swiss Federal Railways
- Lines served: Geneva - Bellegarde (Rhône Express Regional)

Specifications
- Doors: 2 on each side
- Articulated sections: 2
- Maximum speed: 100 km/h (62 mph)
- Weight: 42.5 t
- Power output: 300 kW
- Auxiliaries: 88 kW diesel
- Electric systems: 1,500 V DC
- Current collection: Pantograph
- Track gauge: 1,435 mm (4 ft 8 1/2 in)

The Bem 550 were a series of standard gauge EMU formerly operated by Swiss Federal Railways on the Geneva - Bellegarde line between 1994 and 2014. They was equipped to run with French electric power (1500 V DC) and signalling systems. They were built in 1994, based on the Lausanne Metro Line M1 EMUs, by the Ateliers de Constructions Mécaniques de Vevey in Villeneuve, with electrical equipment provided by ABB.

== History ==
The Bem 550s (or Bem 4/6 as they were originally known) were built to replace the two ageing and notoriously unreliable BDe 4/4^{II} railcars for the Geneva – la Plaine service, and introduced in 1995 under the Rhône Express Regional brand.

With increasing demand for both Geneva – la Plaine and Geneva – Bellegarde services in 2001, the Bem 550 units were modified (at a cost of CHF 12,000,000) to allow them to run beyond la Plaine to Bellegarde.

In 2014 the Bellegarde-Geneva section of the Lyon – Geneva railway was re-electrified at 25 kV AC 50 Hz. The Bem 550 vehicles were thus unable to operate in electric mode on the modernised tracks, but only in diesel mode, and were withdrawn from service on the Geneva-Bellegarde line. Since 2014 there are no longer any standard gauge mainline railway lines electrified at 1500 V DC in Switzerland.

== Technical details ==
The Bem 550 consists of two carriages, each with three swing-out doors (two doors on one side, one door on the other). There is a driving position at each end, with a large windscreen and side windows. The driver sits on the right hand side in the direction of travel. The Bem 550 is equipped for one-handed operation, meaning that driver can drive and brake with one control. It draws traction current though a single-armed pantograph. It is also equipped with an 88 kW diesel engine to enable it to drive to maintenance and storage sheds under Swiss standard 15 kV AC catenary.

== Literature ==
- Hans-Bernhard Schönborn (2004). Schweizer Triebfahrzeuge (in German). GeraMond. pp. 158/159. ISBN 3-7654-7176-3.
