= Swiss locomotive and railcar classification =

Classifications of Swiss trains

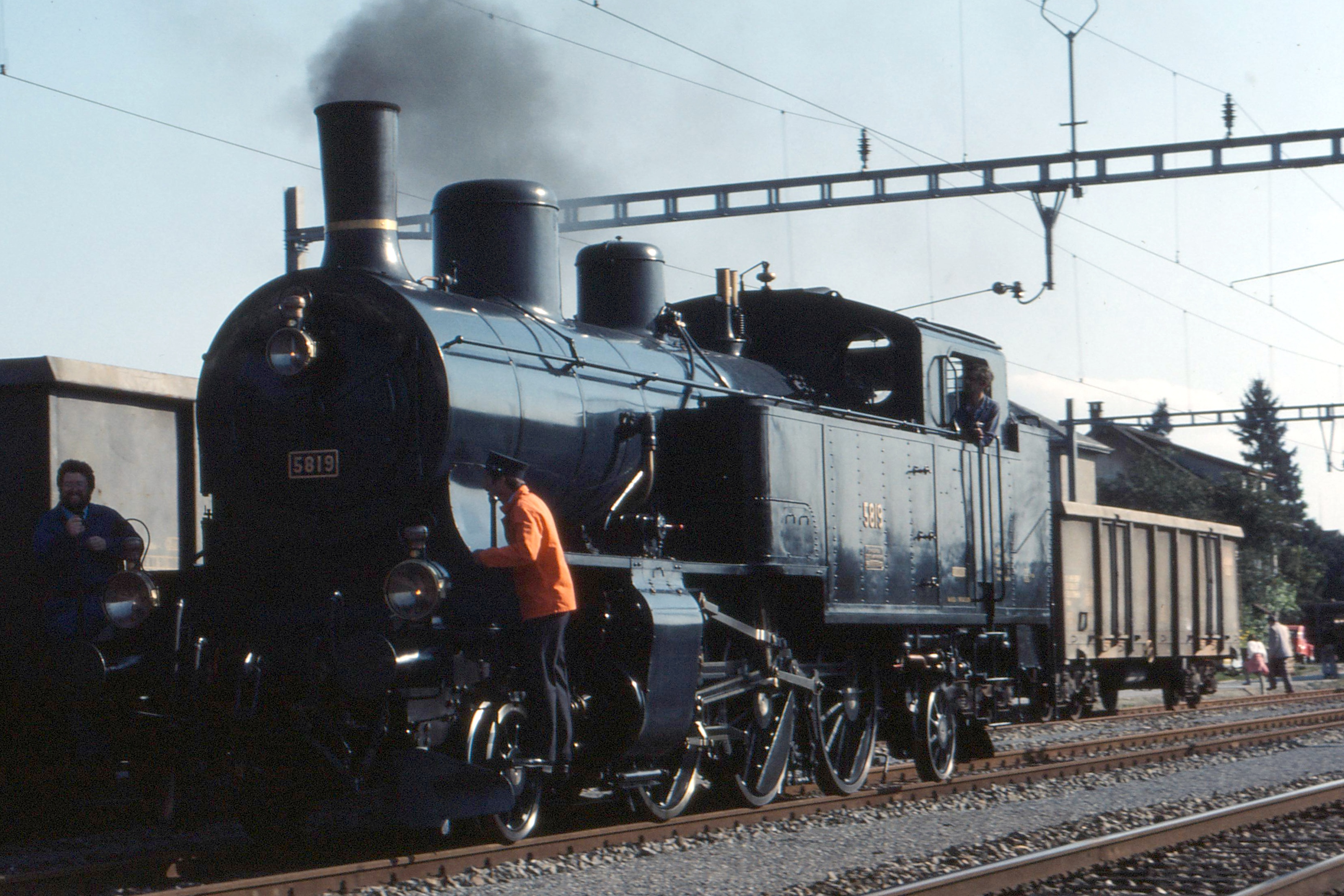
Old system: Eb 3/5 no 5819 at Stammheim, 30 September 1984.

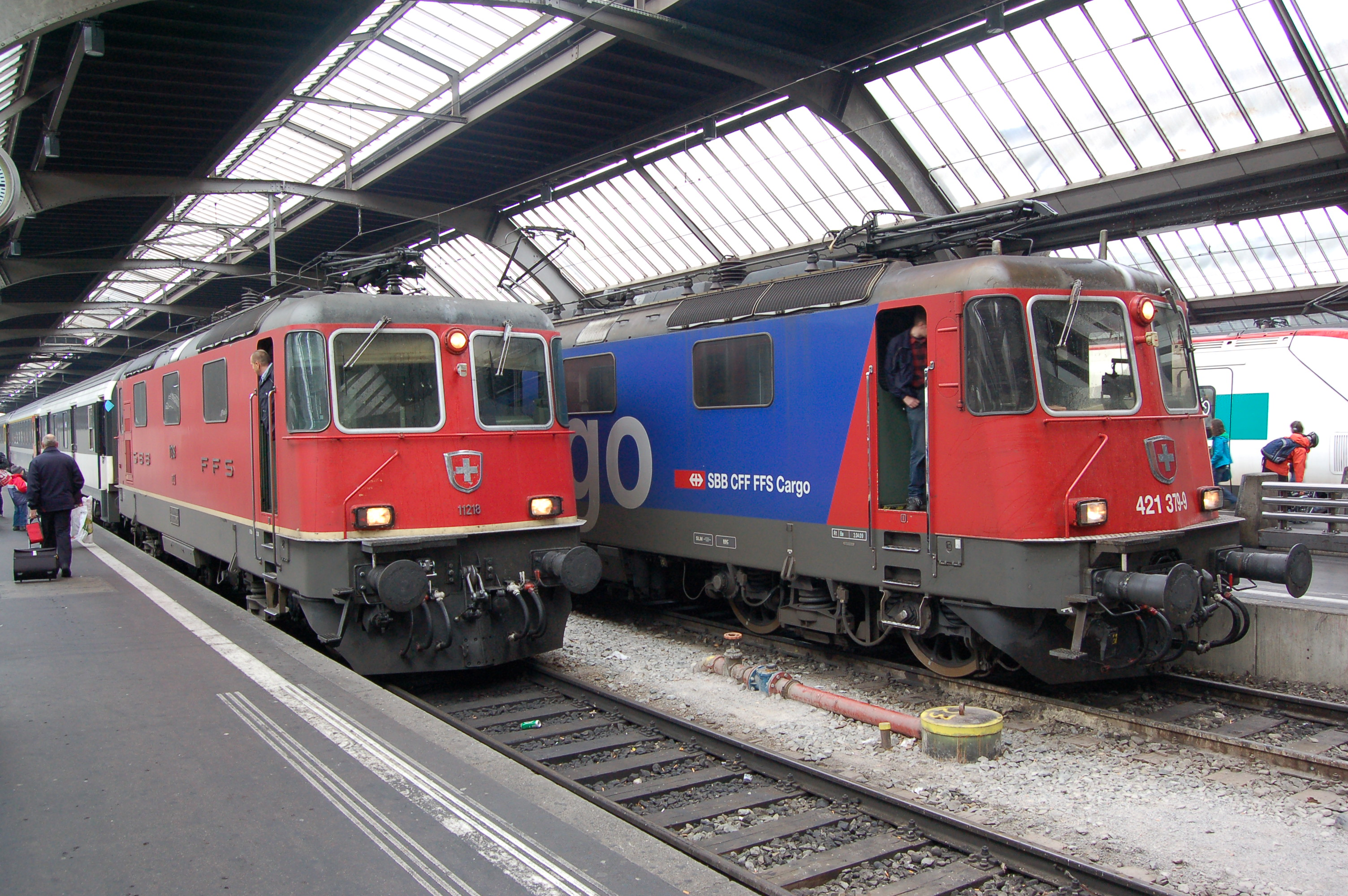
Same series, different systems: Re 4/4 II no 11218 and Re 421 379–9 at Zürich HB on 25 October 2009.

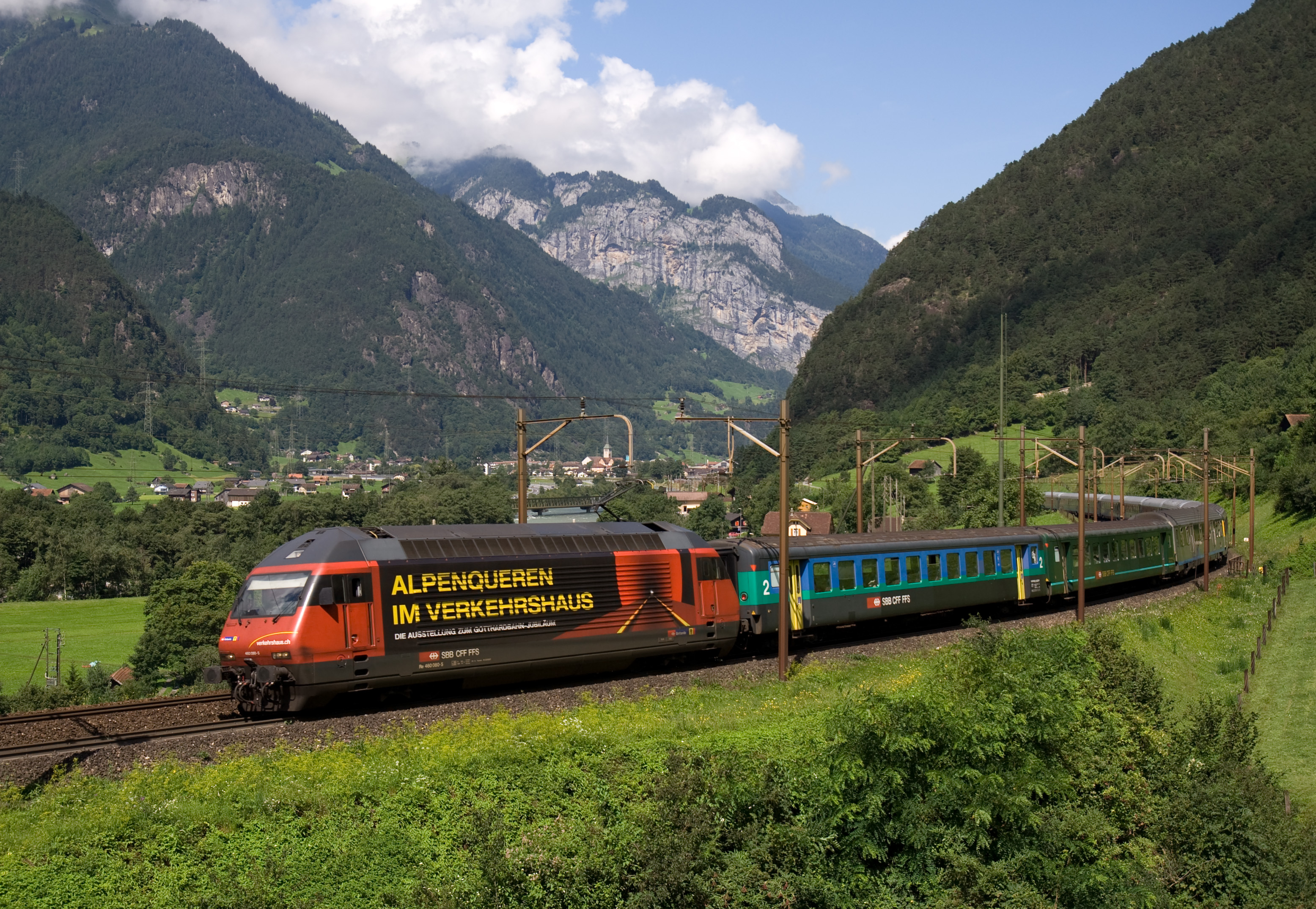
New system: Re 460 near Erstfeld, 16 August 2008.

For more than a century, the Swiss locomotive, multiple unit, motor coach and railcar classification system, in either its original or updated forms, has been used to name and classify the rolling stock operated on the railways of Switzerland. It started out as a uniform system for the classification and naming of all rolling stock, powered and unpowered, but had been replaced and amended by the UIC classification of goods wagons.

== Overview and evolution ==
The Swiss classification system was created by the Swiss federal railways department, and applied originally to the rolling stock of private railways, operating under government concessions. In 1902, when the Swiss Federal Railways was founded as a government railway, that new railway also became bound by the system.

Unlike the Whyte notation and AAR system, both of which are used to classify wheel arrangements, and the UIC classification of locomotive axle arrangements, the Swiss system, in both its original and updated forms, takes into account a number of other variables, including track gauge, motive power type, and maximum speed. The Swiss system is also less precise than those other systems in the way it deals with axles, because it refers only to numbers, rather than to arrangements, of powered axles, and axles as a whole. The Swiss system is therefore more a method of classifying locomotive and railcar types and series than a method of classifying wheel or axle arrangements.

The classifications for which the Swiss system provides have always been adapted to fulfil new requirements. The last modification to the original system occurred in 1968, with the (final) publication of the Directory of the Rolling Stock of the Swiss Private Railways by the Swiss Federal Agency for Transport. For carriages and wagons, the original system was progressively replaced from 1968 by the UIC international wagon classification system. However, all of Switzerland's powered rolling stock initially retained its Swiss type classification or class designation.

In 1989, the Swiss Federal Railways introduced a new classification and numbering system, which combined the old series classification, build type number and vehicle number, but was used at its inception only for new vehicles (the first one being the Re 450). The standard gauge private railways of Switzerland soon followed the example of the Swiss Federal Railways, and an agreement was reached as to the allocation of number ranges. The narrow gauge railways have largely retained the old system for locomotives, railcars and passenger carriages, but there have been some minor individual additions to the old system.

== The original classification system ==
Here is a description of the classification system as it operated up to 1989, and as it still operates in respect of narrow gauge private railway motive power.

=== Locomotives ===
	Locomotive class	Traction type	Number: drive axles	Number: total axles	Series or sub-class	
Classification type	Capital letter	Lower case letter	1st number	2nd number	Roman numeral superscript	
Possible values	{A;B;C;D;E;G;H;R}	absent or {a;e;m}	Natural number	Natural number	Ongoing according to build type	Letters can be combined
Example	R	e	4	4	^{II}	Re 4/4^{II}
Explanatory example	Locomotive with higher cornering speed	Electric	4 Drive axles	4 Axles	2nd Series of the Re 4/4	Electric loco with higher cornering speed, all four axles are drive axles (Bo'Bo'), 2nd series

==== Locomotive class ====
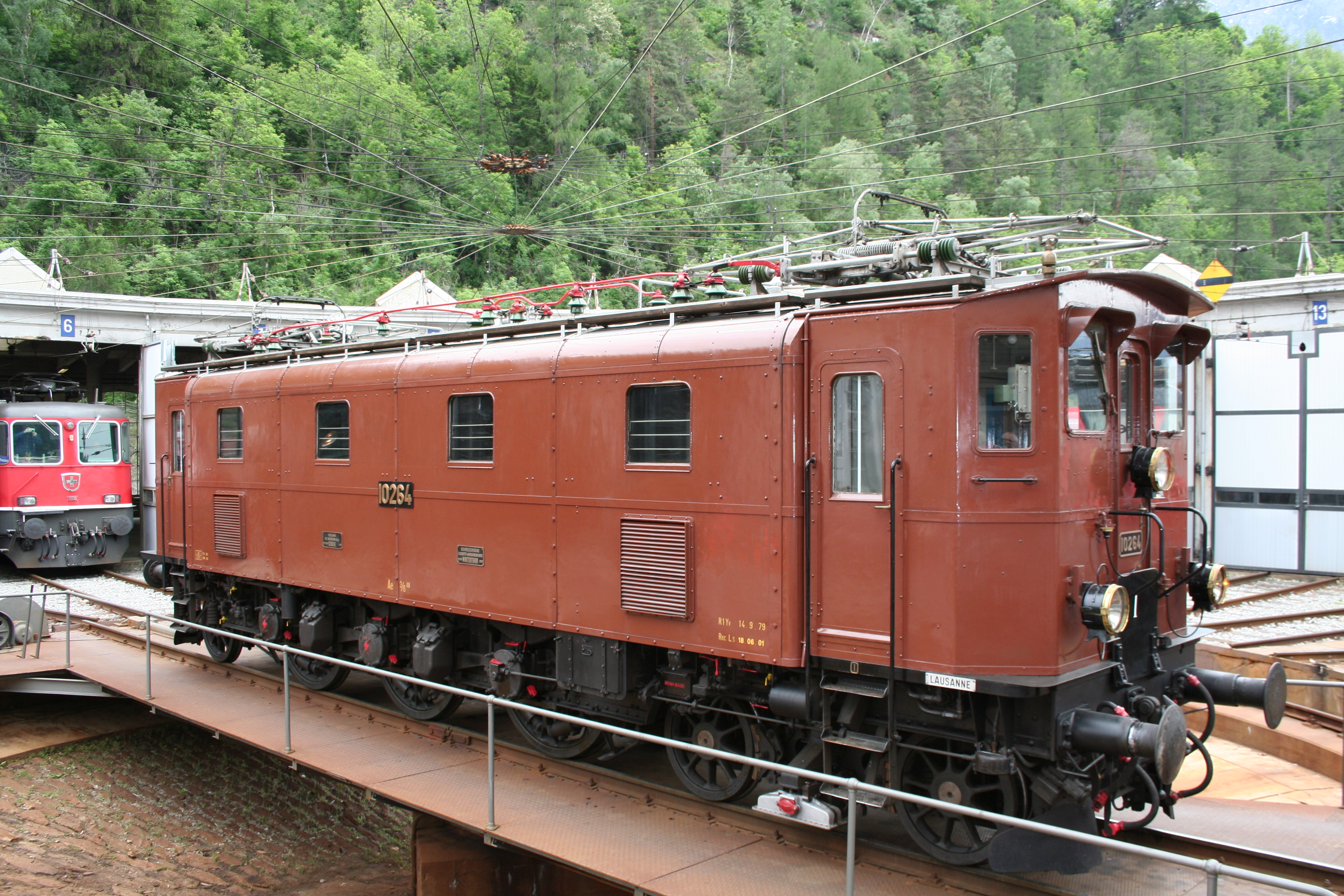
Ae 3/6^{III} on the turntable at Brig, 20 May 2006.

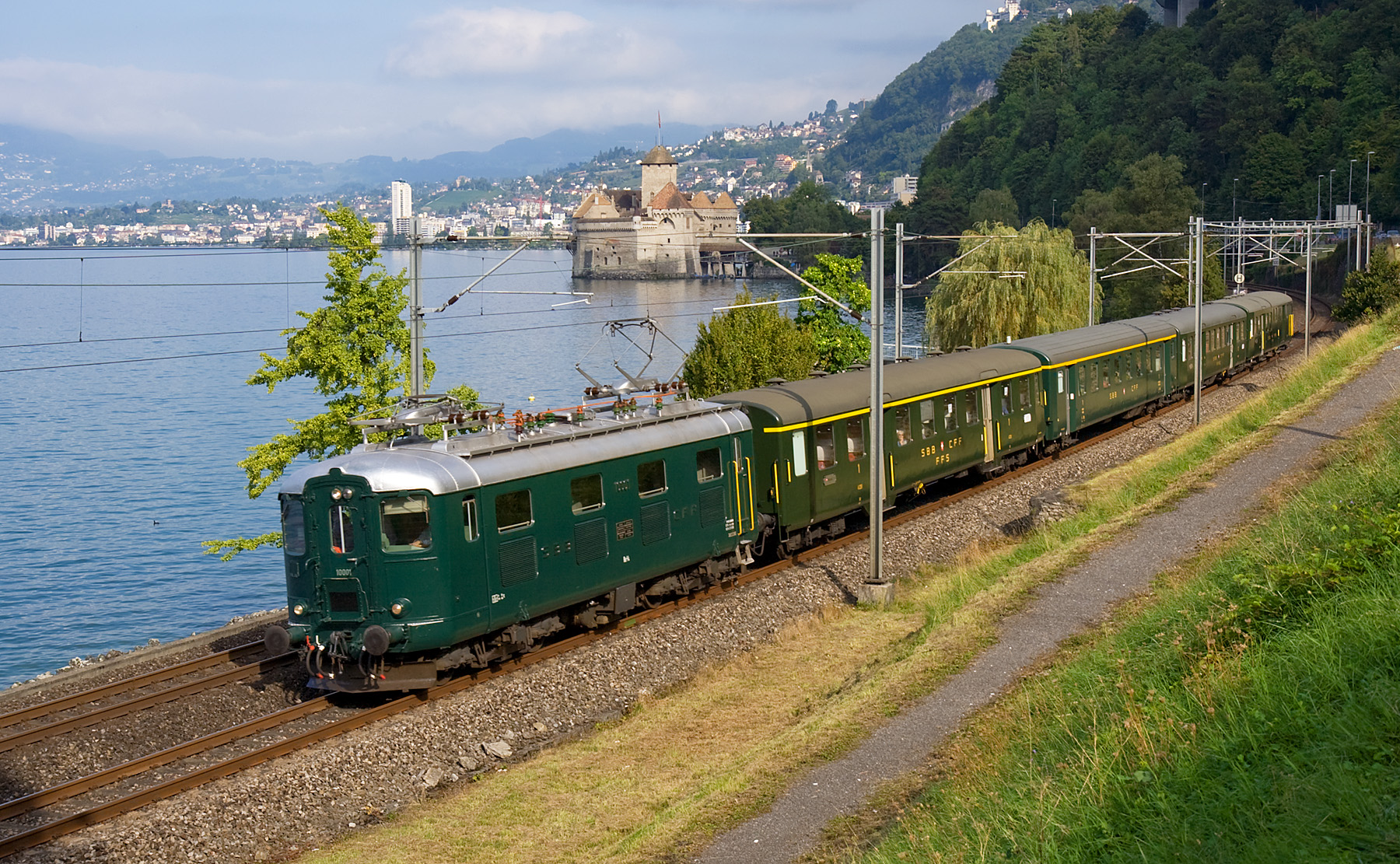
Re 4/4^{I} at Chillon Castle, 20 September 2008.

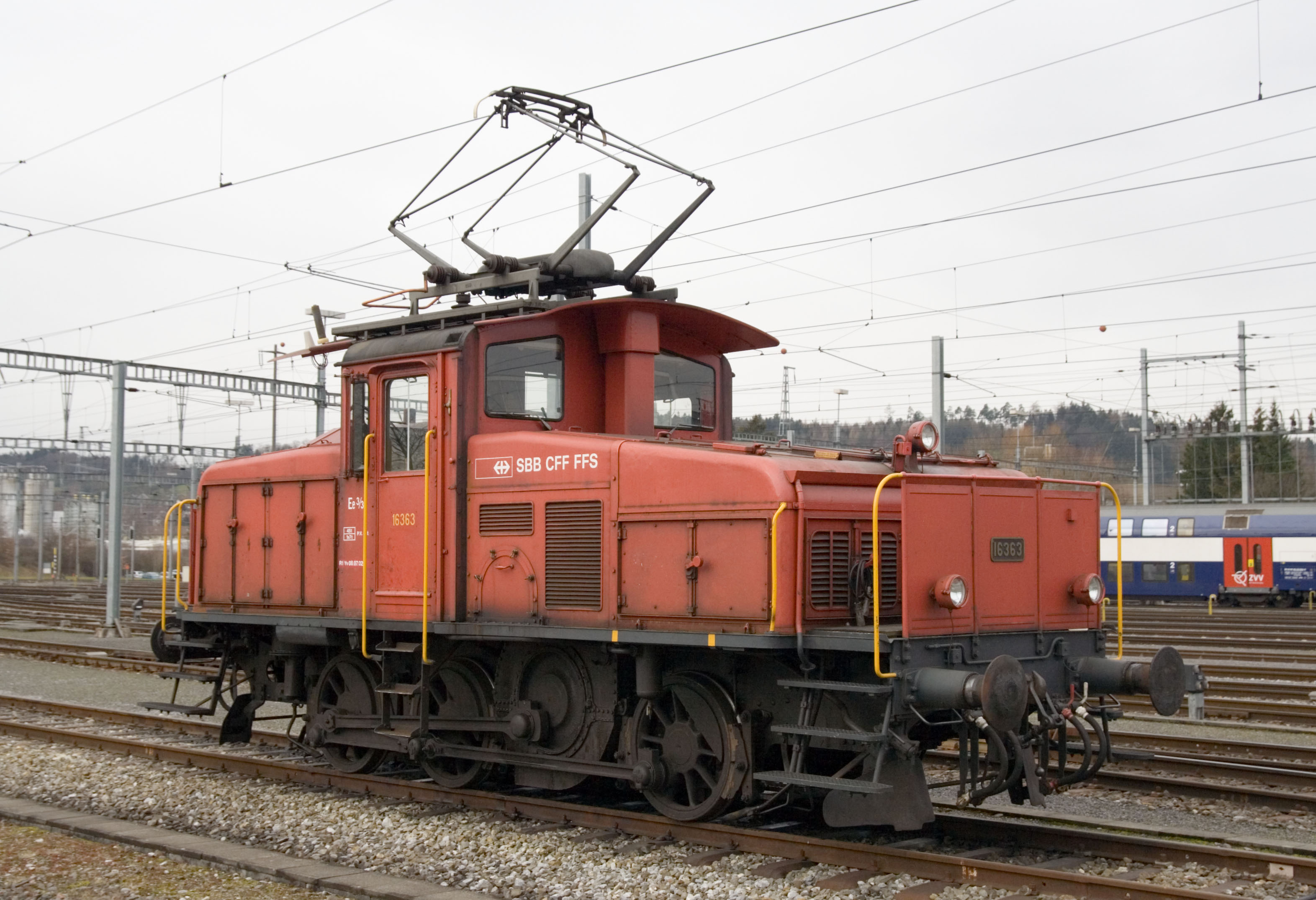
Ee 3/3 at Oberwinterthur, 14 February 2007.

Locomotive class	Meaning
A	Standard gauge locomotive with v_{max} over 80 km/h
B	Standard gauge locomotive with v_{max} from 70 to 80 km/h
C	Standard gauge locomotive with v_{max} from 60 and 65 km/h
D	Standard gauge locomotive v_{max} from 45 to 55 km/h
E	Shunting locomotive, Steam tank locomotive
F	Electric locomotive (only to 1920)
G	Narrow gauge locomotive for adhesion operation
H	Locomotive with rack rail operation
R	Locomotive with higher cornering speed compared with A and v_{max} at least 110 km/h
T	Tractor

There is no provision for combining the codes A, B, C, D, E, G, R and T.

The combination of H and G is possible. HG would therefore be a narrow gauge locomotive, with a mix of adhesion and rack rail drive. However, the editions of the official list of rolling stock published up to 1939 generally defined HG as "Locomotive for adhesion and rack rail drive", and classified the standard gauge RHB steam locomotives as HG 1/2. Since 1966, in respect of railcars and tractors, he or hm has meant pure rack rail drive, and eh or mh has meant a mix of adhesion and rack rail drive.

Steam powered tank locomotives were always given an E, and the maximum speed of the locomotive was designated with a lower case letter. Thus, an Ea 3/6 was a tank locomotive with v_{max} > 80 kilometres per hour (50 mph), three coupled drive axles, and three unpowered axles. With steam locomotives, separate driving mechanisms were displayed. So, for example, a Mallet locomotive was named G 2x2/2 or G 2/3+2/2, and not G 4/4 or G 4/5.

Up until 1920, standard gauge electric locomotives were given the letter F and a lower case letter for the maximum speed level. The class later designated as Be 5/7 was therefore originally named Fb 5/7, and the first Be 4/6 was still designated Fb 2x2/3 as at the date of its delivery.

The designation R (for rapid) was originally intended for locomotives with an axle load of under 16 tonnes (16 long tons; 18 short tons). These lightweight locomotives exert less stress on the rails when they negotiate curves, and were therefore permitted to do so at higher speeds (e.g. 125 kilometres per hour (78 mph), instead of 110 kilometres per hour (68 mph)). With the introduction of the Re 4/4^{II}, the axle load limit was dropped following extensive testing. Several locomotives were later given approval for higher cornering speeds, to which their type designation had not yet been adapted (e.g. the BLS ABDe 4/8 or the Schweizer Hochleistungstriebwagen).

With the advent of the ETR 470 Pendolino, the class designation N was introduced. Thanks to their tilt technology, these multiple unit trains have an even higher cornering speed compared with designation R (e.g. 160 kilometres per hour (99 mph), instead of 125 kilometres per hour (78 mph)). The Swiss Federal Railways Tilt Train RABDe 500 (InterCityNeigezug) also achieves this norm, but the train itself was given the designation R. Technically, locomotives of the class R can also operate to the standards of class N, but in practice the maximum cornering speeds are lower, to improve passenger comfort by reducing lateral forces.

==== Traction type ====
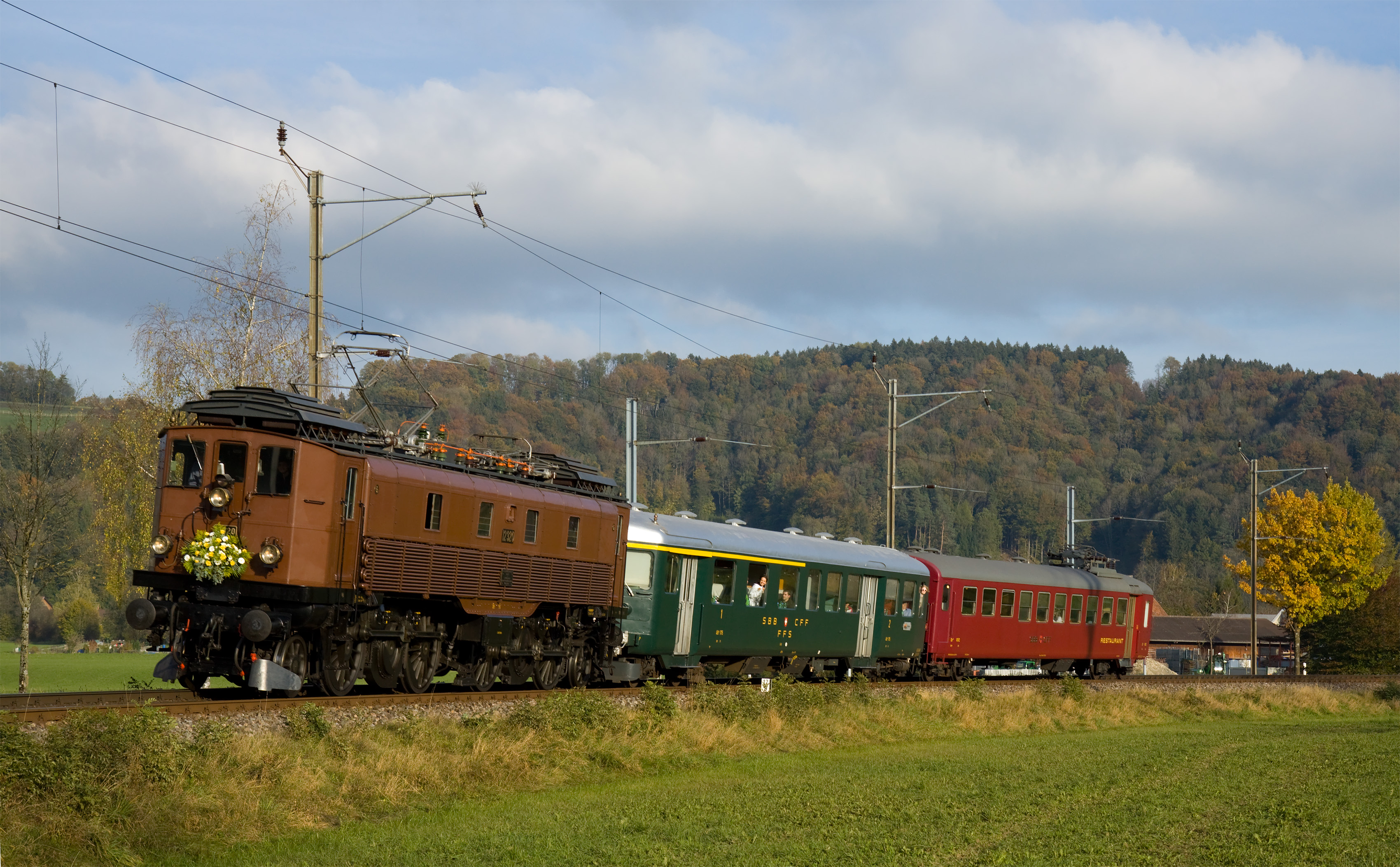
Be 4/6 between Rämismühle-Zell and Rikon, 24 October 2009.

Traction type	Meaning
a	Battery ("Accumulator")
e	Electric
f	Radio control (unofficial extension)
h	Rack rail drive (for railcars and tractors)
m	Fuel (Diesel, Gas turbine)
(absent)	Steam

The additional letters designating traction type can also occur in combination. Examples: Gea, Tem, Gmf

One distinction: with pure rack rail vehicles, the letter h comes in first place after the capital letters; with combined adhesion and rack rail drive, h comes at the end. (Example: rack rail railcar Bhe 4/4, mixed Beh 4/4)

=== Multiple units, motor coaches and railcars ===
	Facilities	Traction type	Number: drive axles	Number: all axles	Series	
Classification type	Capital letters	Lower case letters	1st number	2nd number	Roman numeral superscript	
Possible values	{A;B;C;D;F;R;Z}	absent or {a;e;m}	Natural number	Natural number	Continuing according to series	Letters can be combined
Example	BD	e	4	4	^{II}	BDe 4/4^{II}
Explanatory example	Railcar with 2nd class (B) and luggage (D) compartments	electric	4 drive axles	4 axles	2nd series of the BDe 4/4	Railcar with 2nd class and luggage compartments, all four axles driven (Bo'Bo'), 2nd series, at delivery higher cornering speed not permitted

In a combined multiple unit train, the individual carriages of which cannot be uncoupled, all axles are taken into account, e.g. RABDe 8/16 (Multiple unit train with 4 carriages).

==== Facilities ====
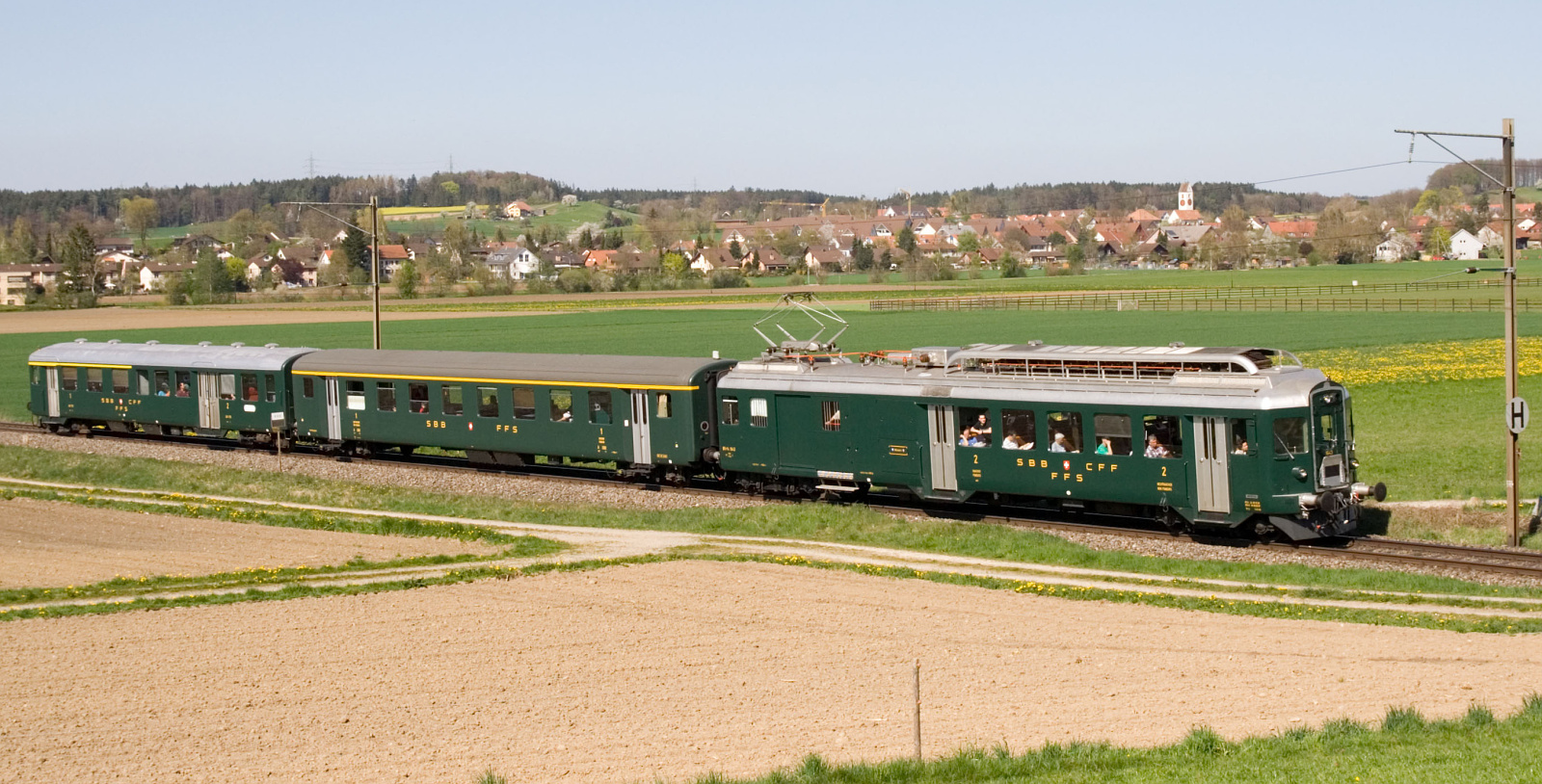
Historic SBB push-pull train consisting of BDe 4/4, A, ABt near Hettlingen ZH

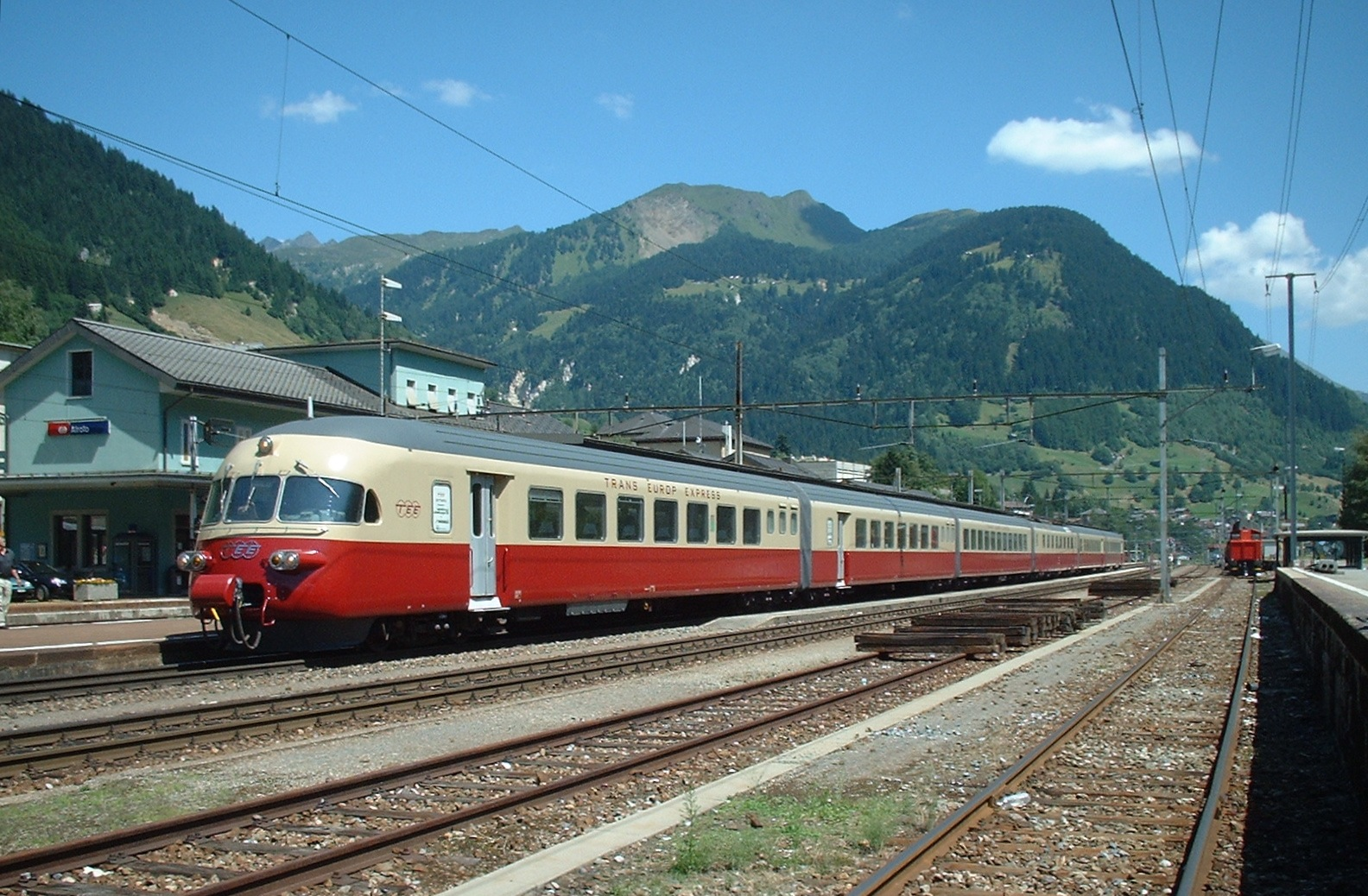
Preserved RAe TEE II 1053 at Airolo, on a special excursion after being restored.

Facilities	Meaning
A, As	Vehicle with first class or saloon compartment
B	Vehicle with second class compartment
C	Vehicle with third class compartment (before 1956)
D	Vehicle with luggage compartment (since 1962)
F	Vehicle with luggage compartment (to 1961)
K	Covered freight railcar (all Ke were later reclassified as Fe)
O	Open freight railcar (Ohe 1/2 31 of the Pilatusbahn)
R (at front)	Multiple unit, motor coach or railcar with higher cornering speed and V max at least 110 km/h (in 2009 the first narrow gauge vehicle met this criterion and was also classified R this was RBS RABe 4/12 21–26)
R, r (after A or B)	Restaurant, Buffet
S	Special compartment
ST	Self-propelled special flat wagon with bogies (Cargo sprinter)
X, V	Service vehicle
XT, VT	Self propelled service vehicle
Z	Post office compartment

An electric railcar with first class, second class, and luggage compartments would be given the classification ABDe. If it were also authorised to operate with higher cornering speeds, then it would be classified as RABDe. Notwithstanding the rules described here, the TEE railcars were classified as RAm or RAe, although they also had a luggage compartment, a restaurant and various other special features.

For multiple units, motor coaches and railcars with cogwheel drive there is an additional rule. If the railcar is a pure cogwheel drive vehicle, the symbol h is placed before the means of propulsion designator (e.g. the Bhe 2/4 of the Gornergratbahn). If a cogwheel drive vehicle can also operate in adhesion mode, the symbol h is placed after the means of propulsion designator (e.g. the ABDeh of the Matterhorn Gotthard Bahn).

==== Traction type ====
See above, under the heading "Locomotives". The same classifications apply.

=== Examples ===
To illustrate the original system in operation, here are some examples:

- Ae 4/7: Standard gauge locomotive with a maximum speed of over 85 kilometres per hour (53 mph) (A), powered by electricity (e), with four drive axles (4) and a total of seven (7) axles, i.e. three carrying axles. (This classification could also denote an electric railcar with a first class compartment.)
- Bm 4/4^{II}: Standard gauge locomotive with a maximum speed of between 75 kilometres per hour (47 mph) and 85 kilometres per hour (53 mph) (B), powered by diesel (m), with a total of four axles (second 4), all of which are drive axles (first 4). As there had already been a locomotive series with the classification Bm 4/4, this series was given an Index ^{II}, which means that this was the second series. (This classification could also denote a diesel railcar with a second class compartment.)
- RBe 4/4: Motor coach with higher cornering speed (R) and second class compartment (B), powered by electricity (e), with four axles (second 4), all of which are drive axles (first 4). (This classification cannot apply to any locomotive, as the combination of R and B is not possible with locomotives.)
- A 3/5: Standard gauge locomotive with a top speed of over 85 kilometres per hour (53 mph) (A), powered by steam (no traction type designator), with three drive axles (3) and a total of five axles (5), i.e. two carrying axles. (This could also be the classification of a railcar with first class compartment.) The locomotive's tender is not included in the descriptor.
- Ge 4/4^{III}: Narrow gauge locomotive (G) powered by electricity (e), with a total of four axles (second 4), all of which are drive axles (first 4), third series of this classification(^{III}).

== The updated classification system ==
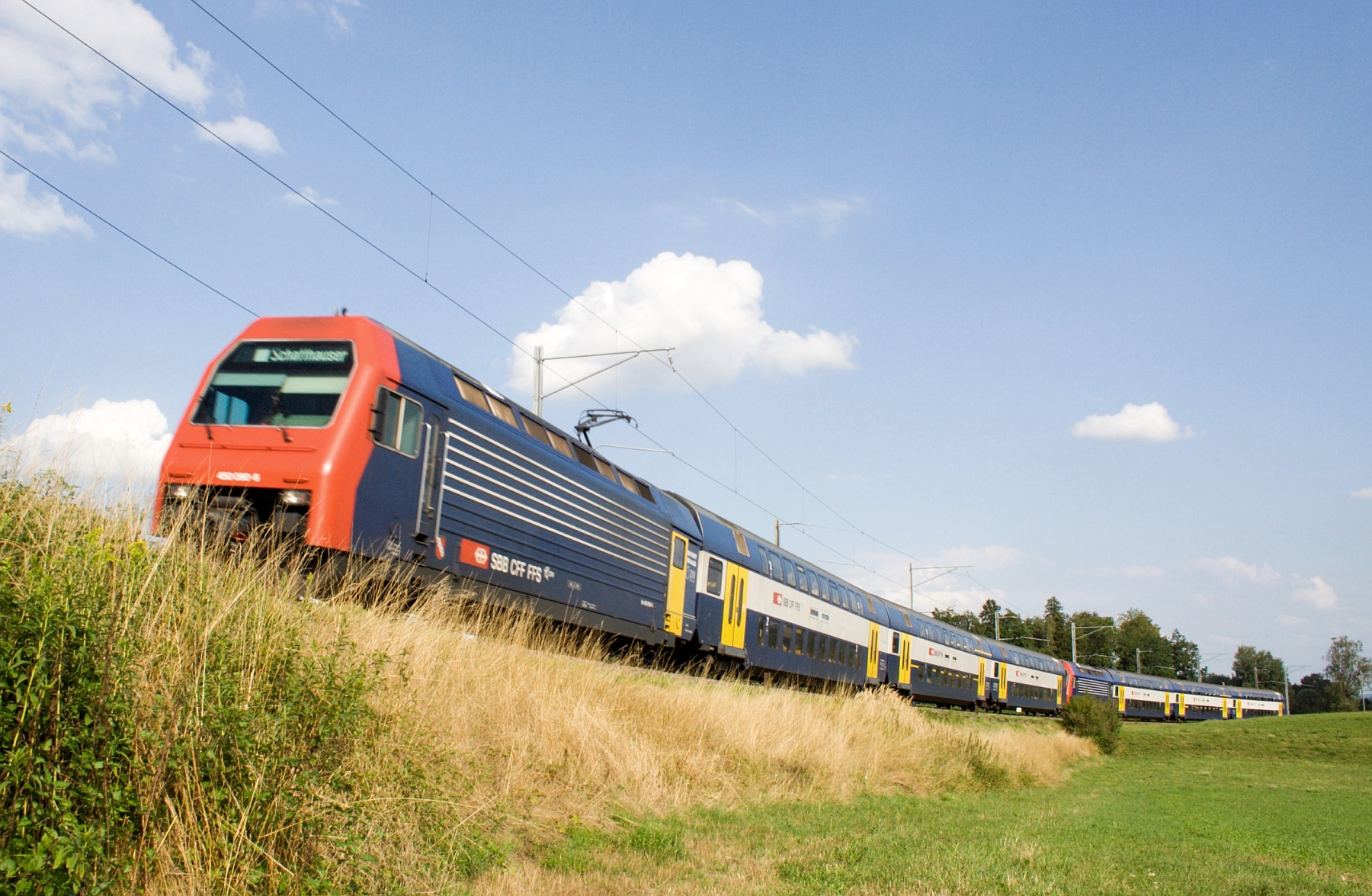
An Re 450 hauling a Zürich S-Bahn train, August 2006.

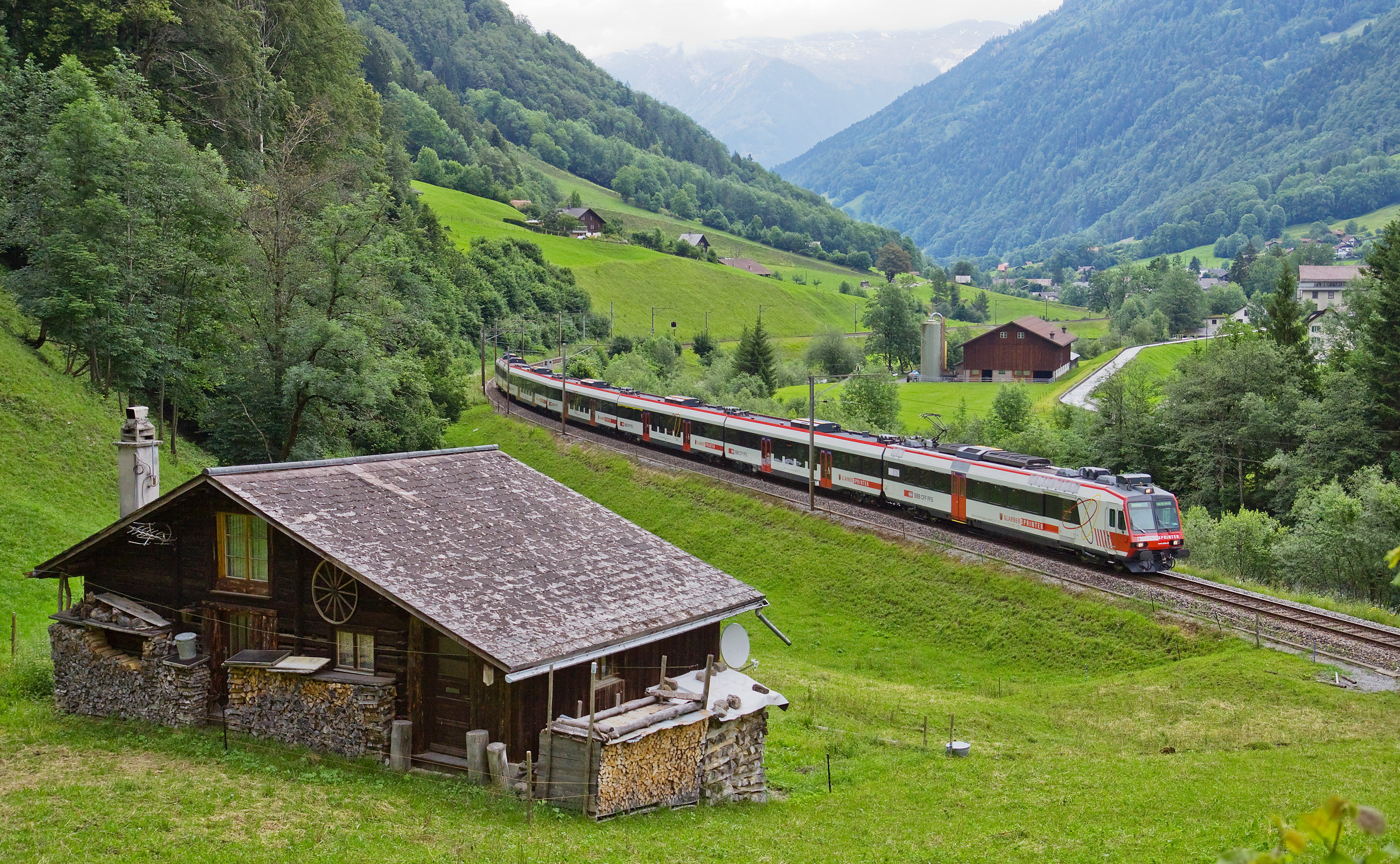
RBDe 560 near Linthal, 23 June 2009.

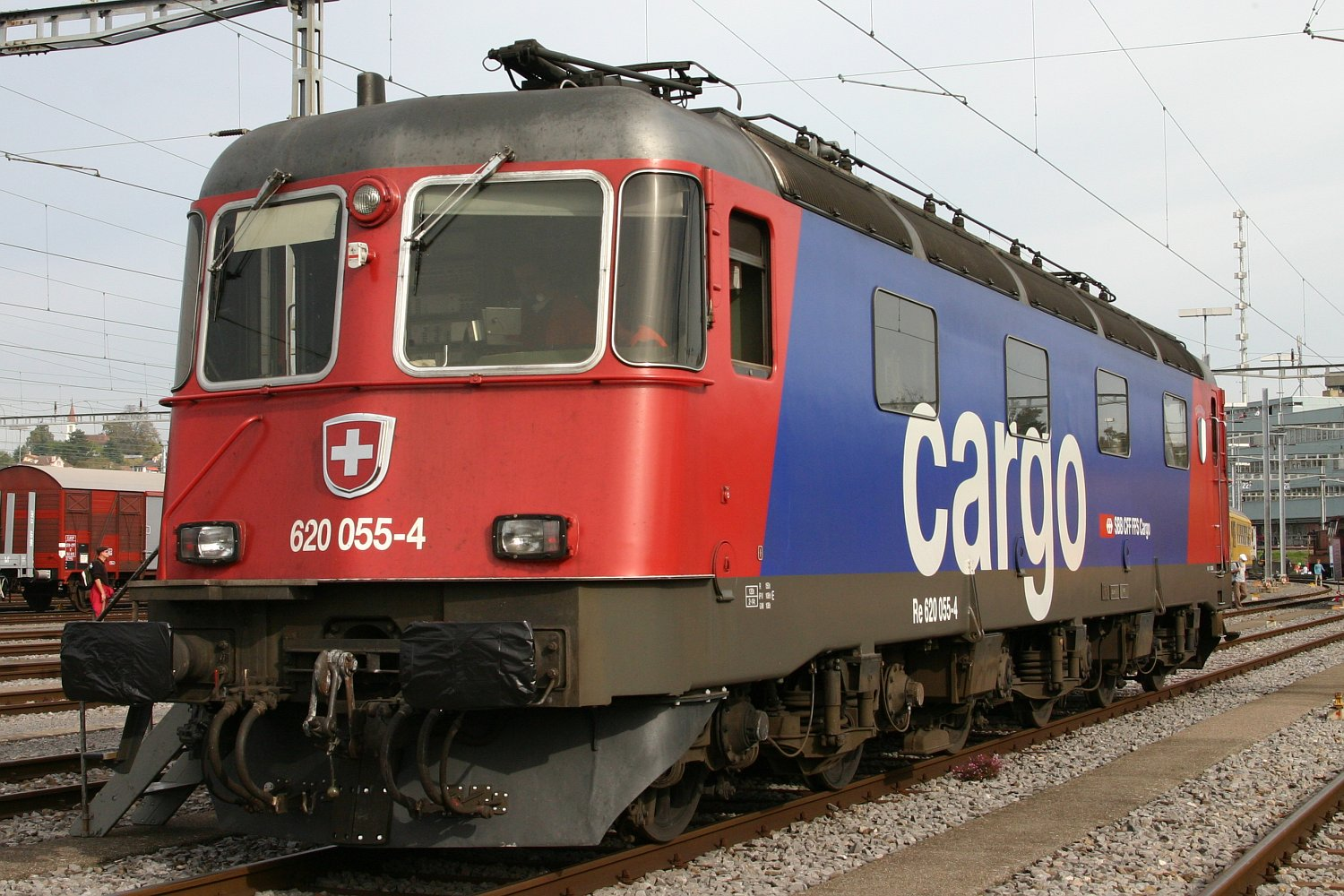
Re 620 055–4 at Lausanne, 28 October 2007.

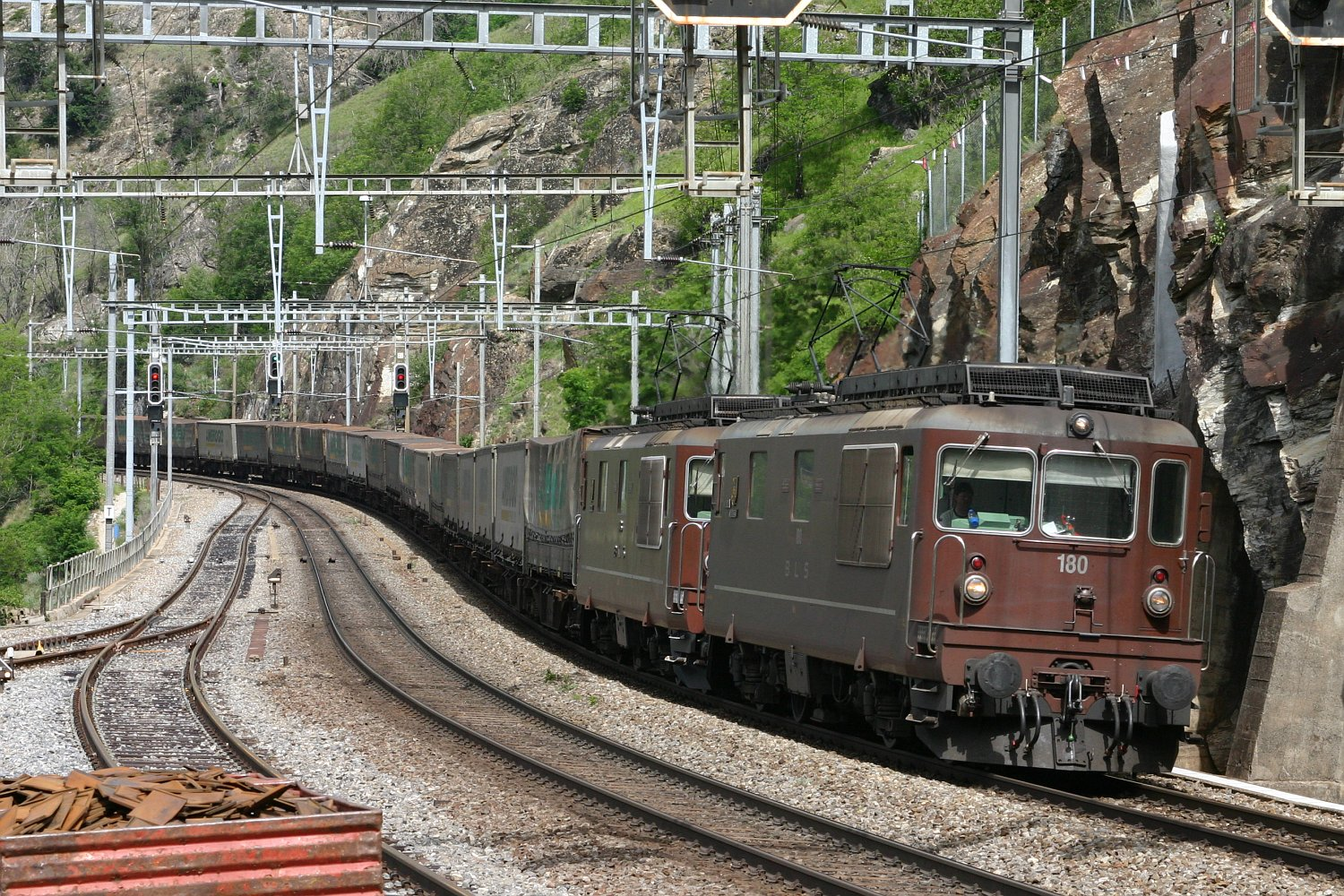
The BLS's unrenumbered Re 4/4 (Re 425) no 180 at Lalden, 25 May 2007.

=== Formation ===
At the end of the 1980s, the Swiss Federal Railways began drafting a new computer compatible and UIC compliant numbering system for its motive power. The superscript indices in the existing scheme (e.g. Re 4/4^{IV}, ^{V}, ^{VI}...) presented a particular problem for this draft new system's planned method of data collection. By 1988, the drafting process had led to a first draft of a UIC compliant numbering scheme, which, however, never came fully into operation. At that time, the plan was that the first digit of a vehicle's number would denote the number of drive axles, and the second digit would correspond with the superscript used for that vehicle's series under the original system (e.g. Re 4/4^{II} would become Re 420). For locomotives with carrying axles, the oblique stroke included in the old name would be replaced by the digit 9 (e.g. Ae 4/7 would become Ae 497).

This first draft revised system was "UIC compliant" insofar as the check number was calculated in accordance with the UIC regulations. On the other hand, the first draft did not envisage the display of a vehicle's numbers as twelve digits in the standard UIC designated form (for locomotives) of 9x 85 x xxx xxx - x for the Swiss Federal Railways, and 9x 63 x xxx xxx - x for the BLS. Under the first draft revised system, the first five digits were each designated as nil, as was already the case with various other European railway companies. Numbers displayed in that manner could be used only domestically, which at that time seemed sufficient.

As the first new locomotive series following the development of the first draft revised system, the Re 450 series was classified partially in accordance with that draft; what would have been the locomotive numbers under the old system (10500ff) were replaced by sequential numbers (000 ff), and the number of axles was still prepended to the vehicle number in the old fractional form (Re 4/4 450 000 ff). Upon the delivery of the first Re 460 locomotives in 1991, a corresponding classification style was used.

In 1992, the first draft revised system was itself comprehensively revised into a Draft '92. Under the latter draft, the indication of the numbers of a vehicle's axles in fractional form was abandoned, but the designation of the traction type was retained. The old vehicle number system was completely replaced with new sequential numbers beginning with 000. The new numbering was supposed to take into account all vehicles that, as at 1988, were still in service with the Swiss Federal Railways. But that principle was inadvertently ruled out, and therefore not followed, in the assignment of new numbers.

In the Draft '92, the significance of the digits in their individual places was further diversified, and became no longer readily comprehensible without a key table. In addition, the Swiss private railways, and private owners of motive power (e.g. construction firms, siding owners), were taken into account. These other owners were identified in the Draft '92's proposed system in the third and fourth digits in each vehicle's number. By 1992, the Swiss Federal Railways had already numbered a tractor series in accordance with the proposed new scheme, but with numbers that had been assigned to the BLS. However, these Tm 235 tractors, nos 000-014 (Robel 1991–92), carried their original numbers until they were withdrawn.

The Draft '92 was consistently applied to newbuildings from 1992 to about 2004. For a long time, however, existing locomotives and railcars received the new seven digit numbers only in conjunction with major rebuilding work (e.g. RABDe 510, RBe 540). The RBDe 4/4, reclassified upon completion of minor revisions in 1996 as the first series of class RBDe 560, remained for a long time an exception to the slow renumbering - the replica series of this series had already had new numbers since its delivery, and therefore the classification of the "old" series was adjusted in 1996 to match the new series. Since about 2003, locomotives operated by SBB Cargo (Re 420, Re 620, Ae 610) have been renumbered upon their being reliveried. On the other hand, SBB Passenger traffic had not yet renumbered a single Re 4/4^{II} as at the end of 2009.

With this only hesitant renumbering, some motive power continues to run under its "old" numbers. The Swiss Federal Railways has therefore not so far abandoned its general practice of continuing to operate the older vehicles under their old classifications, and it is likely that many locomotives will be withdrawn still bearing their old numbers.

The BLS has reclassified all of its railcars and most of its tractors. However, the ex-RM vehicles continued to retain their old number range. All new or newly acquired locomotives operate with new numbers, but the brown liveried locomotives (especially Re 425 161 ff) have not yet had their new numbers applied to the locomotive bodies.

Many private railways have reclassified their motive power fairly consistently with the revised system. However, it is customary for the last two or three digits of any new number to serve as the vehicle's unique number for internal purposes. For some individual small companies there is nevertheless no trace of the new numbers to be found.

=== Structure ===
The locomotive class or equipment codes letters (upper case), as well as the traction type code letters (lower case), are as described above, according to the old scheme, and continue to precede the UIC number (RABDe or Re 460).

The numbers are represented as two three digit groups, supplemented by a check digit, which is separated from the rest of the number by a hyphen. The first three digit group serves to designate the vehicle series (RABDe 500 008–8 or Re 460 003–7). Functionally, the UIC number is divided into three pairs:

First and second digit: Vehicle type / Traction

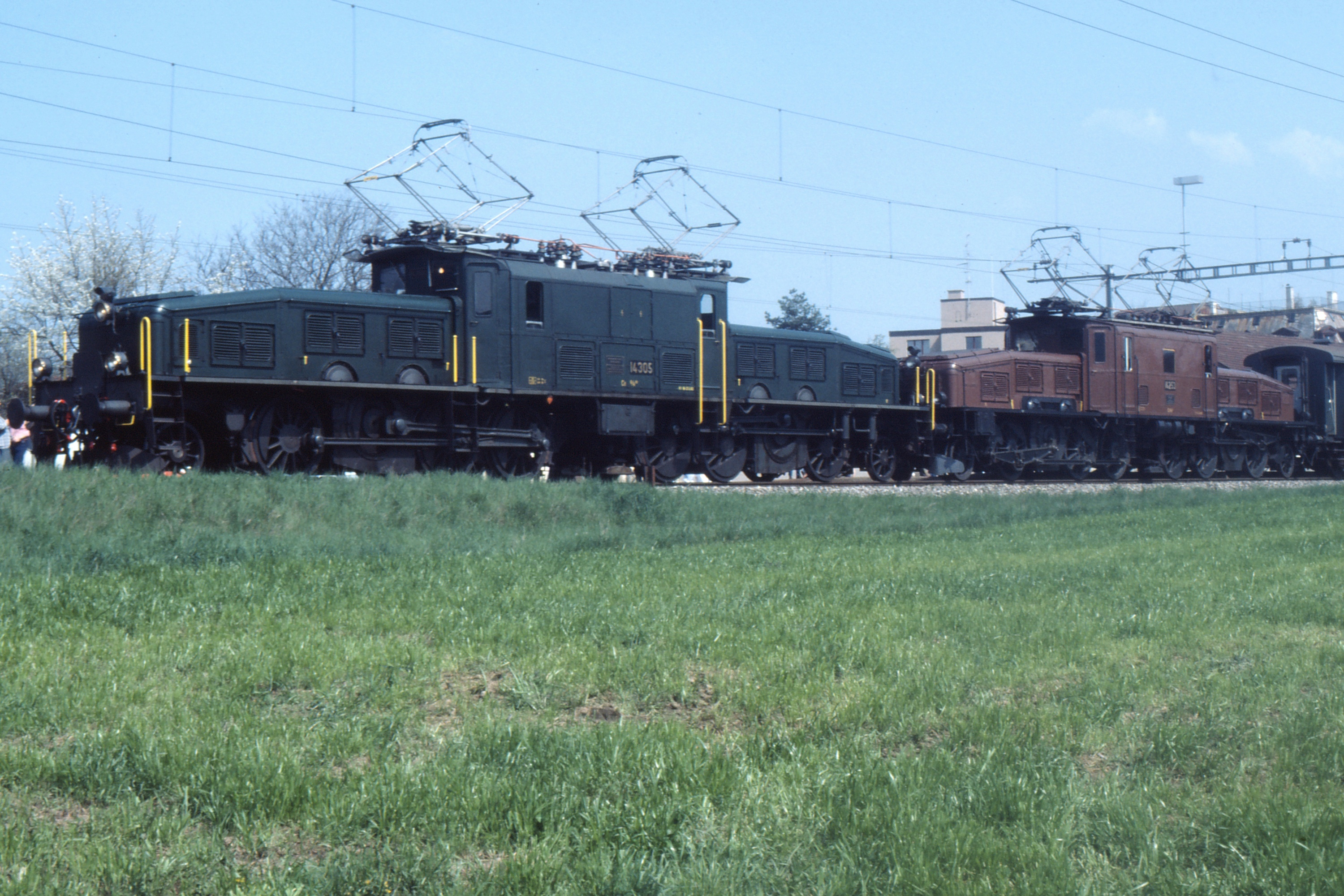
New numbers have not been applied to the locomotive bodies of these heritage Crocodiles.

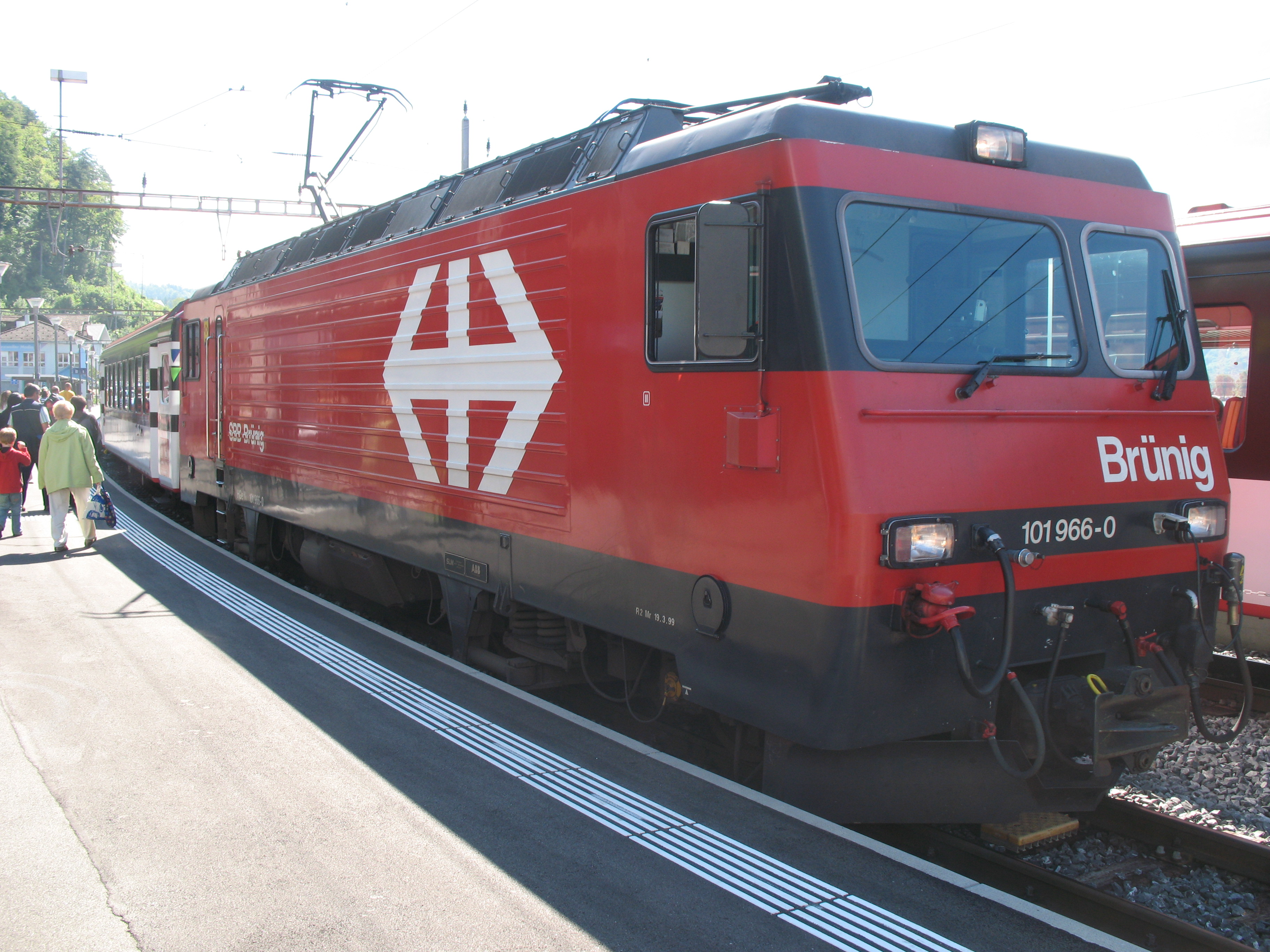
SBB Brünig HGe 101 966–0 at Brienz, 25 July 2007.

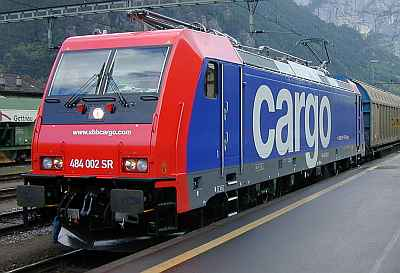
Re 484 002 SR at Göschenen, 19 December 2004.

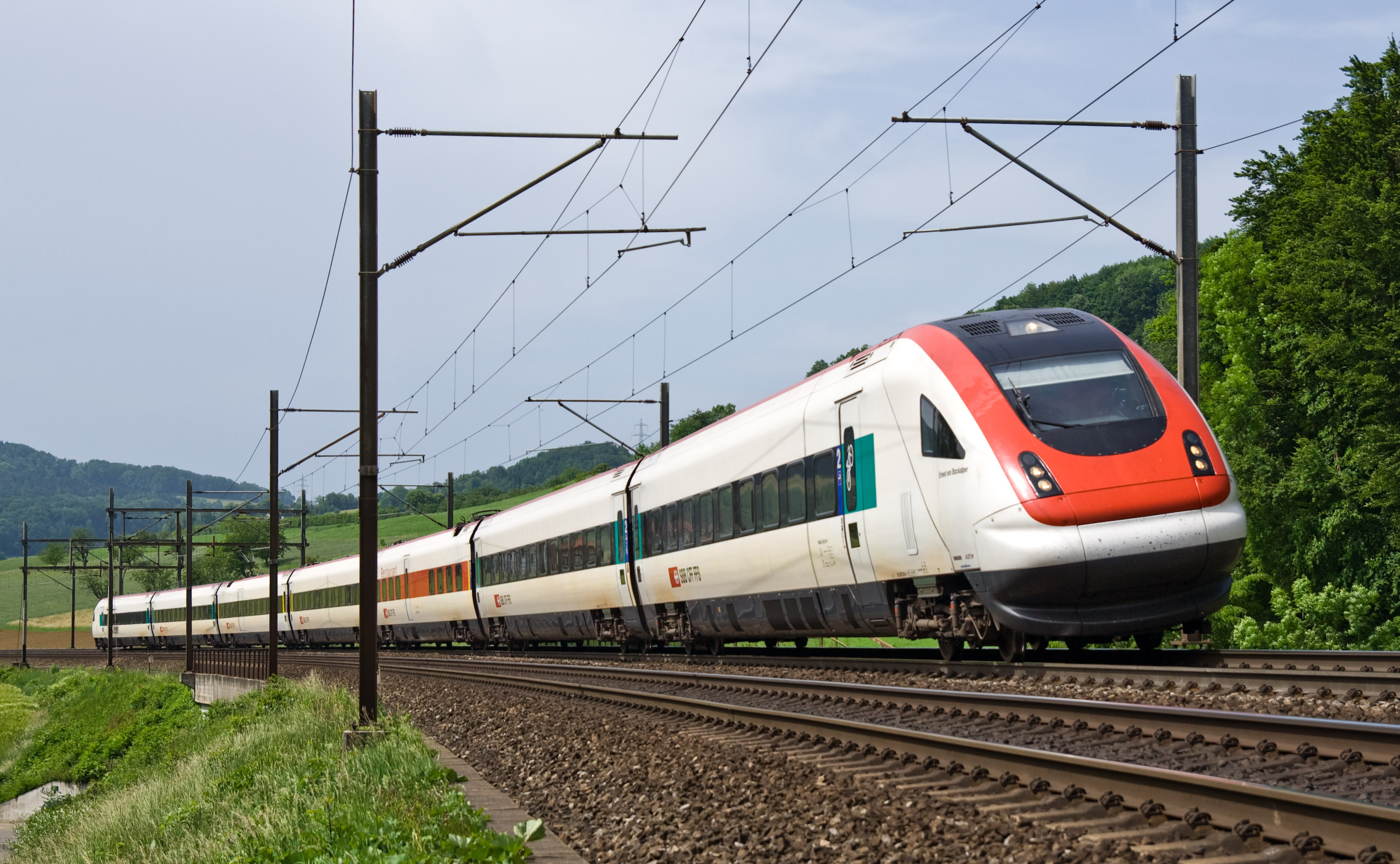
RABDe 500 at Hauenstein, 25 May 2007.

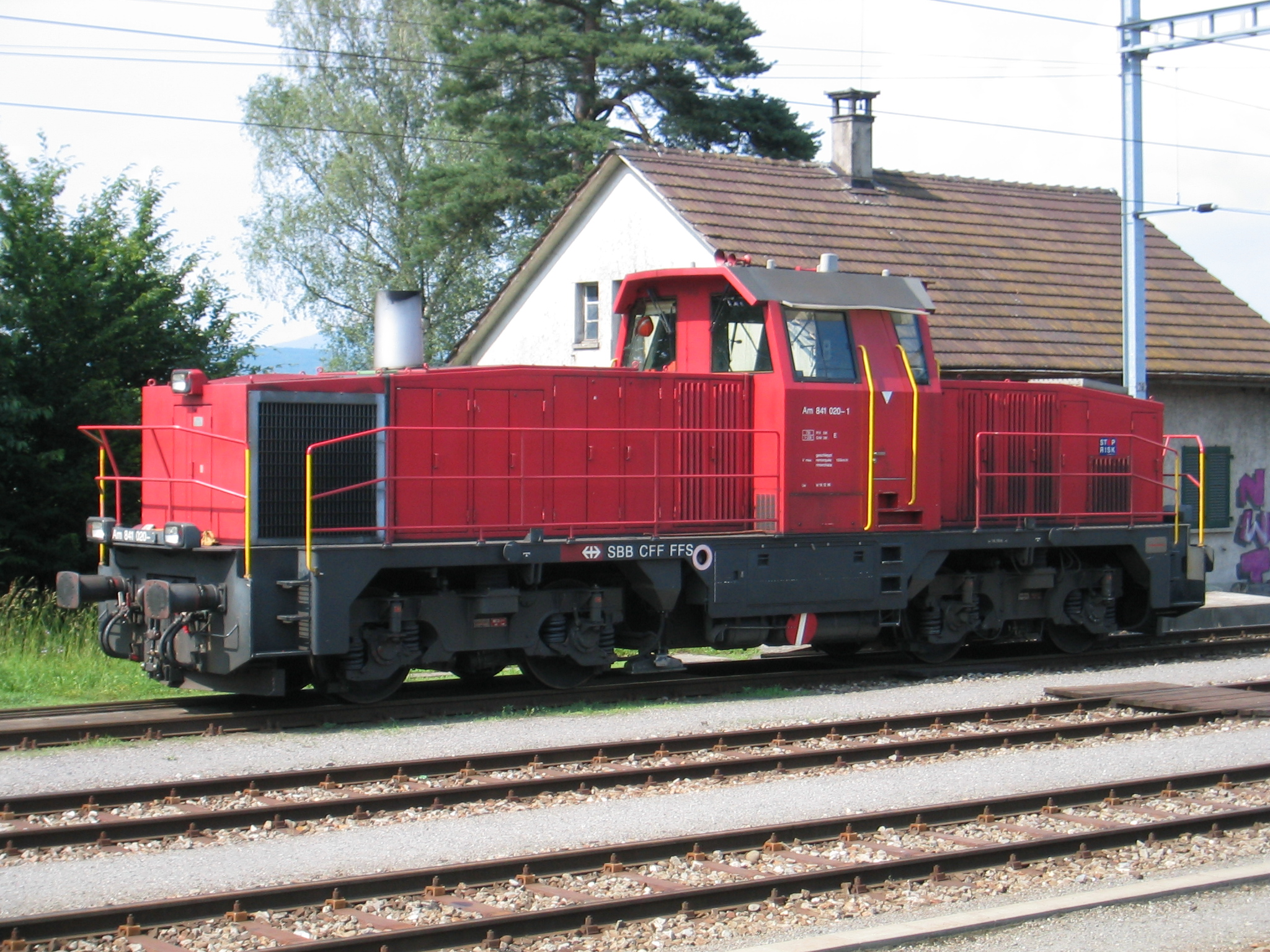
Am 841 020–1 at Möhlin, 7 June 2003.

- 0: Steam locomotives and heritage locomotives
  - 00: Steam locomotives
  - 01: Electric locomotive
  - 02: Electric railcars/multiple units
  - 03: Diesel locomotives
  - 07: Tractors
  - 08: Snow ploughs
  - 09: Special vehicles
- 1: Narrow gauge vehicles (Brünigbahn, today Zentralbahn)
  - 10–14: Locomotives and railcars
  - 17: Tractors
  - 18: Snow ploughs
- 2: Tractors (Shunting locomotives, power rating < 500 kW)
  - 20: Battery (accumulator) powered tractors (Ta)
  - 21: Electric tractor (Te)
  - 22: Electro-diesel tractor (Tem)
  - 23: Diesel tractor (Tm)
  - 24: Electric tractor: Catenary and battery operation (Tea)
- 3: Electric locomotives with fewer than 4 powered axles (not used so far)
- 4: Electric locomotives with 4 powered axles
- 6: Electric locomotives with more than 4 powered axles
  - Second digit where the first digit is 3, 4 or 6: the type of locomotive in accordance with the previous generation index in superscript Roman numerals, e.g.
    - Re 420 = Re 4/4^{II}
    - Re 430 = Re 4/4^{III}
    - Re 450 = planned: Re 4/4^{V} (Locomotive for Zürich S-Bahn)
- 5: Multiple units, motor coaches and railcars
  - 50: Long distance multiple units
  - 51: Multiple units for suburban traffic
  - 52: Multiple units for regional traffic
  - 53: Motor coaches and railcars with first and second class
  - 54: Motor coaches with second class
  - 55: Light railcars second class
  - 56: Newer motor coaches with second class and luggage compartment
  - 57: Older motor coaches with second class and luggage compartment
  - 58: Motor Luggage Van
  - 59: Diesel railcars
- 7: Intended for self-propelled departmental vehicles and construction machines, finally used for Cargo-Sprinters
- 8: Diesel locomotives
- 9: Electric shunting locomotives
  - Second digit where the final digit is 8 or 9: number of driven axles

Third and fourth digits: Owning company

As operators of various locomotive series delivered in large numbers, the main railways (especially the SBB-CFF-FFS, and also the BLS) have correspondingly large number ranges available for their use (SBB-CFF-FFS 00–49, BLS 50–59). On the other hand, the smaller private railways can only obtain numbers for series of up to 100 vehicles (00-99), but this is usually sufficient. Since 2003, the specified numbering principles have been breached many times by vehicles that have become the property of the SBB-CFF-FFS whilst retaining their numbers in the range 60-69, and by privately owned vehicles, or vehicles owned by private railways, that have been given numbers from the SBB-CFF-FFS range (especially the BLS Re 420 locomotives numbered 501-512).

- Third digit 0 to 4: Owner SBB-CFF-FFS
  - Third digit for electric locomotives and electric railcars or trains:
    - 0: Single voltage vehicle
    - 1: Single voltage vehicle, equipment for Germany
    - 2: Dual voltage vehicle
    - 3: Single voltage vehicle, variant / subclass
    - 4: Four voltage vehicle
  - Third digit for Tractors:
    - 0: to 99 kW
    - 1: 100 to 199 kW
    - 2: 200 to 299 kW
    - 3: 300 to 399 kW
    - 4: 400 to 499 kW
  - Fourth digit: Part of the serial number, where there is a separate series or subclass

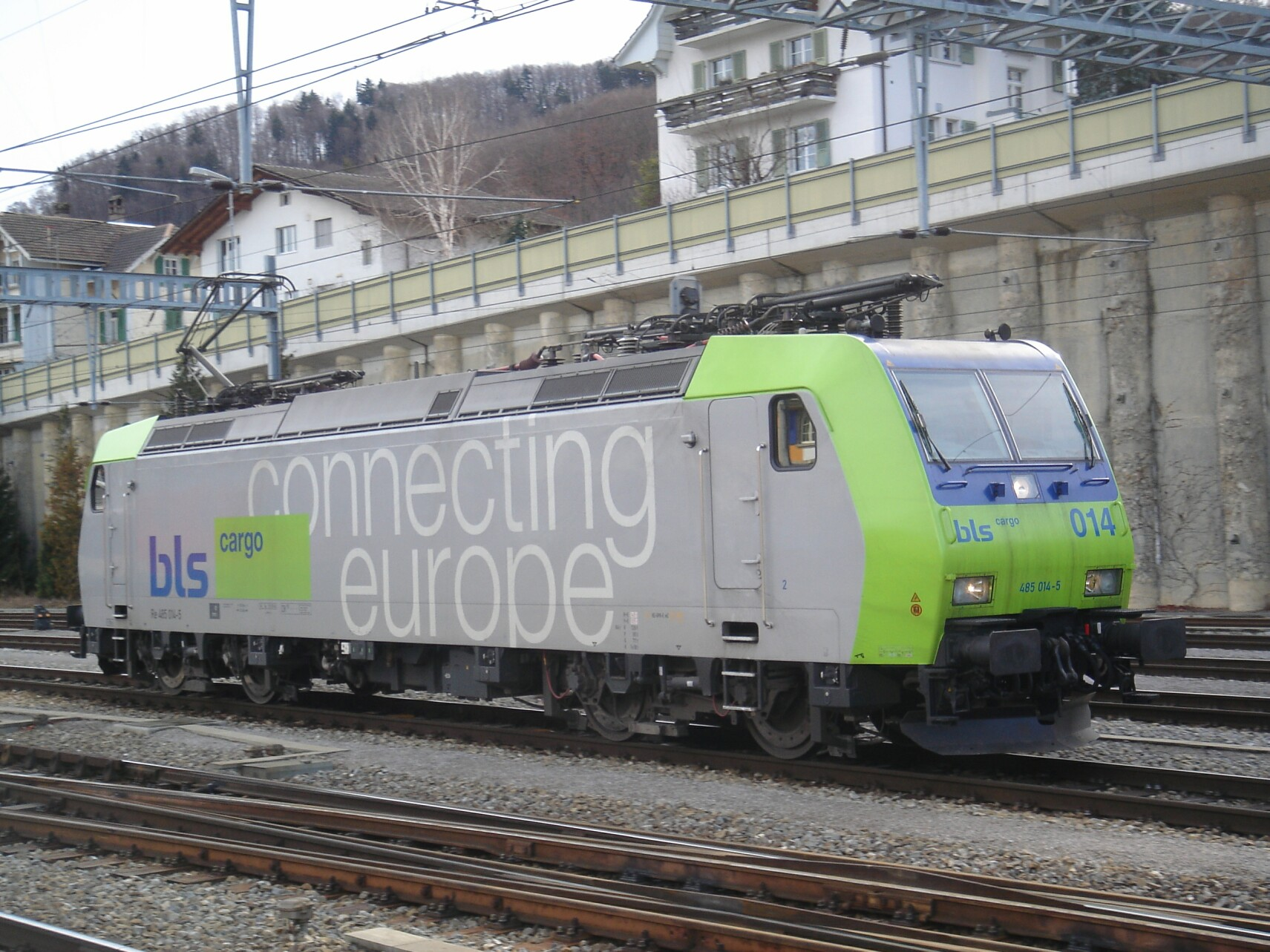
BLS Re 485 014–5 in Spiez, 18 February 2006.

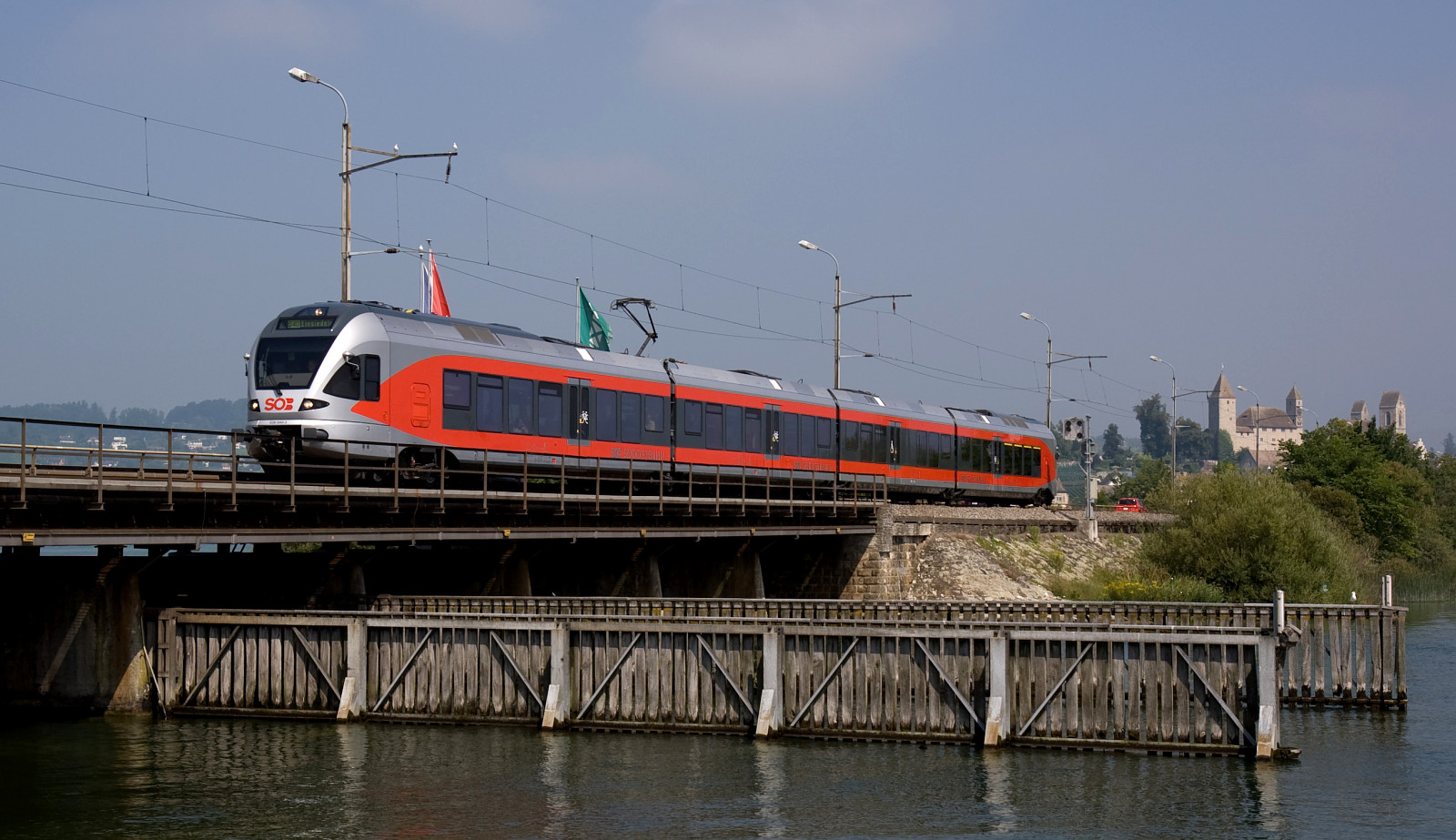
SOB RABe 526 on the causeway between Rapperswil and Pfäffikon, 30 August 2008.

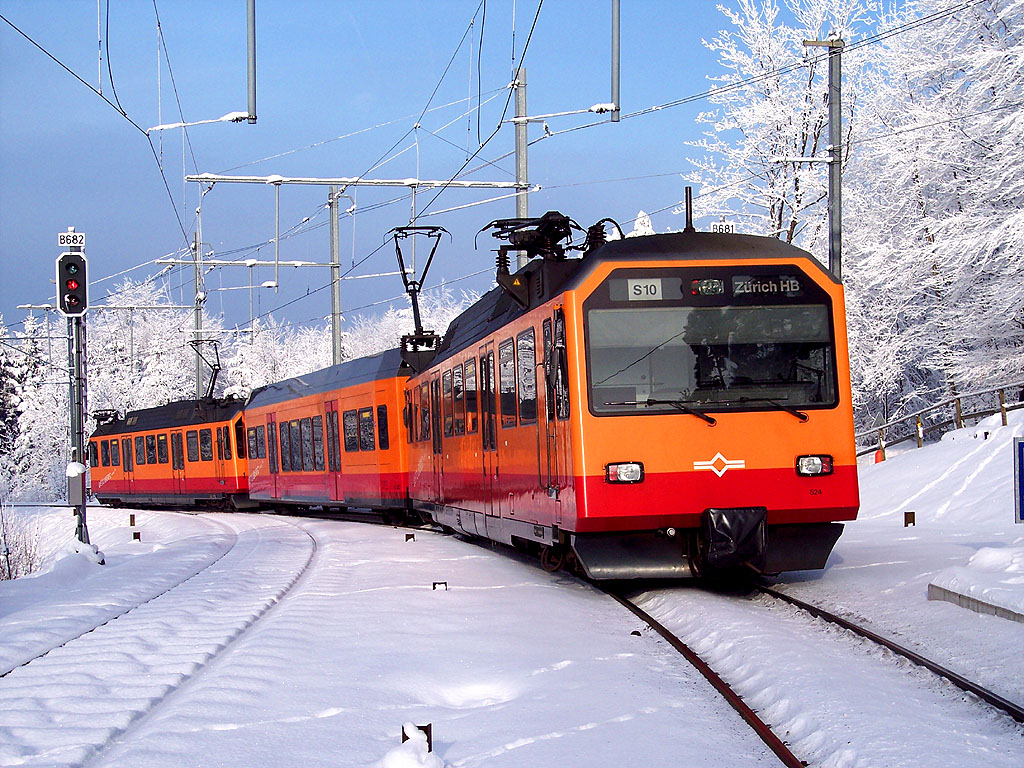
SZU Be 556 524 leaving Uetliberg, 30 December 2005.

- Third digit 5: Owner BLS Lötschbergbahn (BLS), formerly BLS/BN/GBS/SEZ
  - Fourth digit: Part of the serial number
- Third and fourth digits: further owning companies:
  - 60: Schweizerische Südostbahn (SOB), formerly Bodensee-Toggenburg-Bahn (BT)
  - 61–63: Regionalverkehr Mittelland (RM), formerly EBT/VHB/SMB, today BLS
  - 64: former Schweizerische Südostbahn (SOB)
  - 65: Sihltal Zürich Uetliberg Bahn (SZU)
  - 66: Thurbo, formerly Mittelthurgaubahn (MThB)
  - 67: Thurbo
  - 68: Reserve, will be used by Thurbo from 2010
  - 69: BABHE, formerly OKK
  - 70 und 71: Transports publics Fribourgeois (TPF), formerly C d f Fribourgeois Gruyère-Fribourg-Morat (GFM)
  - 72: Oensingen-Balsthal-Bahn (OeBB), not used
  - 73: Transports Régionaux Neuchâtelois (TRN), formerly Chemin de fer Régional du Val-de-Travers (RVT)
  - 74: Chemins de fer du Jura (CJ)
  - 75: Transports de Martigny et Régions (TMR), formerly Chemin de fer Martigny-Orsières (MO)
  - 76: Chemin de fer Orbe-Chavornay (OC)
  - 77: Private (originally intended for Western Switzerland)
  - 78: Private (originally intended for Central Switzerland)
  - 79: Private incl. Lokoop (originally intended for Eastern Switzerland)
  - 80: Post (POST), formerly (PTT)
  - 81: former Sensetalbahn (STB)
  - 82: Tramway Sud-Ouest Lausannois (TSOL)
  - 83: TRAVYS, formerly Chemin de fer Pont-Brassus (PBr)
  - 84: BDWM Transport (BDWM), Wohlen-Meisterschwanden-Bahn (WM)
  - 85: Sursee-Triengen-Bahn (ST), not used
  - 86: Rigi Bahnen (RB), formerly Arth-Rigi-Bahn (ARB)/Vitznau-Rigi-Bahn (VRB)
  - 87: Appenzeller Bahnen, formerly Rorschach-Heiden-Bergbahn (RHB), not used
  - 88: former Métro Lausanne–Ouchy (LO)
  - 89: Kriens-Luzern-Bahn (KLB), not used

Fifth and sixth digit: sequential numbering

The individual vehicle numbers can begin with either 00 or 000, as long as the fourth character is not assigned to a function. The BLS and most other private railways either assigned sequential numbers beginning with 01, or retained the old operating numbers, so as to be able to continue working internally with those numbers. Since about 2004, the SBB-CFF-FFS has similarly numbered its motive power beginning with the number 001.

Examples:

- Re 460 003–7 is the fourth locomotive of the SBB-CFF-FFS Re 460 series (the first one had the sequential number "000").
- BLS Re 465 003–2, on the other hand, is the third locomotive of its series.
- SOB BDe 576 048 to 059 were originally BT 50–53 and SOB 80–87. Upon the merger of the SOB and the BT, the two oldest SOB-BDe vehicles, nos 80 and 81, were assigned the sequential numbers 48 and 49. However, the newer vehicles in the SOB series had been delivered after the BT BDes were delivered, and were therefore renumbered as 54–59, to reflect exactly the delivery order of the merged company's BDe series as a whole.
- SOB Re 456 096 is the sixth locomotive of its series, which was originally numbered BT 91–96.

=== Application since 2005 ===
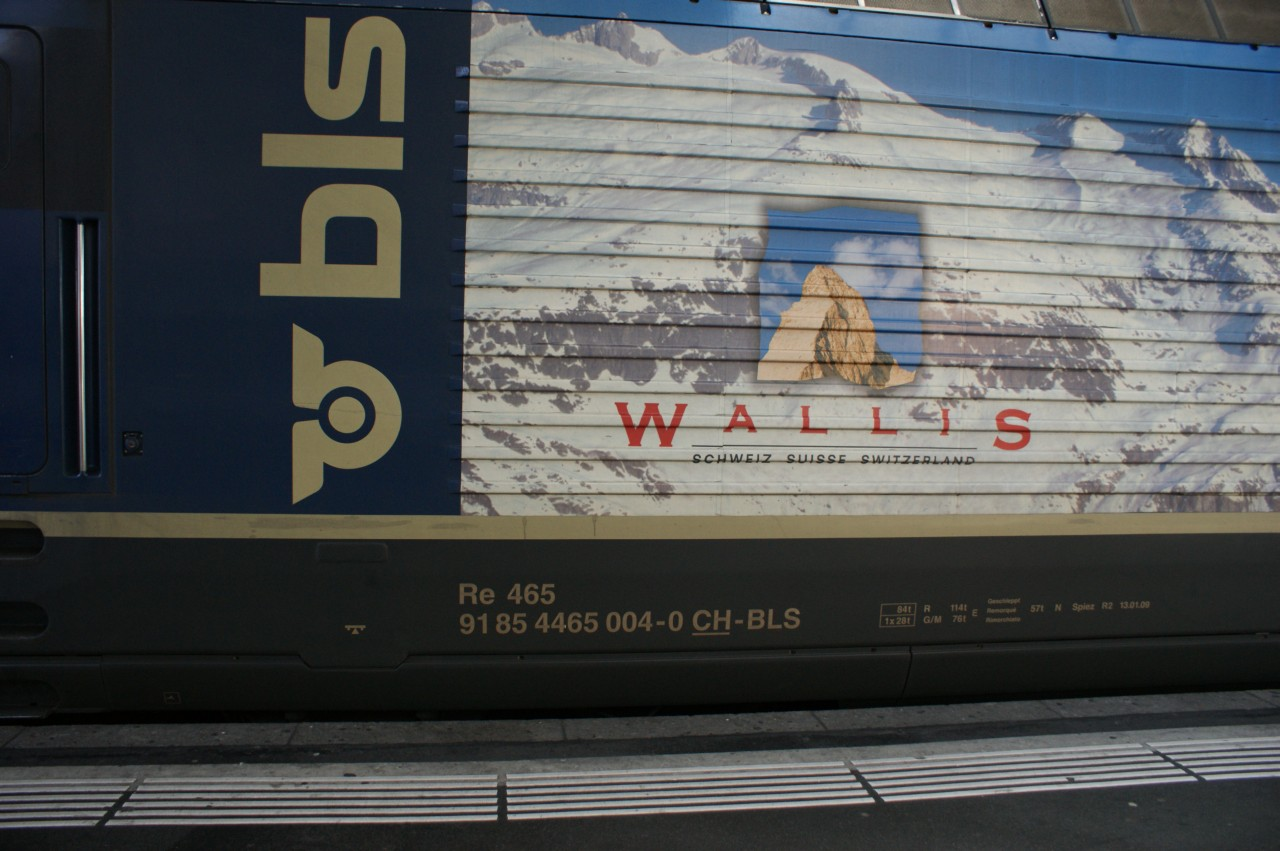
BLS Re 465 004–0 with vehicle number 91 85 4 465 004-0 CH-BLS, valid from 2009 onwards.

In 2005, with the onset of international movement of Swiss-based locomotives, there had to be a move to allocate twelve digit numbers for them. At the same time, the UIC code number 85 was changed from an owner code for the SBB-CFF-FFS to a country code for Switzerland or "CH".

On the other hand, a need arose to separate the various vehicle series into "classes". So, for example, when the Re 4/4^{II}s that the BLS had acquired from the SBB-CFF-FFS were reclassified, those locomotives became not the Re 425 class as envisaged by the scheme, but the Re 420.5 class. Similarly, the replicas of the SBB-CFF-FFS Am 843 class locomotives that were delivered to other owners were similarly classified, contrary to the '92 draft, as Am 843 (Am 843 151ff und 843 501ff).

If a vehicle was initially allocated a twelve digit number according to the old UIC regulations, and using the second digit as a balancing number (which, however, was only to be found in directories), then a TSI compliant number was assigned to the vehicle from 2008. The TSI compliant numbers use the fifth digit as a balancing code. The balancing code is so calculated that the twelve digit and seven digit vehicle number have the same control number.

An example:

- 1995 delivered as BLS Re 465 004-0
- later classified internally as BLS Re 465 | 95 63 0 465 004-0
- 2009 definitively renumbered as Re 465 | 91 85 4 465 004-0 CH-BLS

== See also ==
- AAR wheel arrangement
- List of stock used by Swiss Federal Railways
- UIC classification of locomotive axle arrangements
- Wheel arrangement
- Whyte notation
