= Plain City =

Plain City may refer to:

- Plain City, Ohio, United States
- Plain City, Utah, United States

== See also ==
- Plain (disambiguation)
