= Plaine =

Plaine may refer to:

- Plaine (river), a tributary of the river Meurthe in France
- Plaine, Bas-Rhin, a commune in Alsace in north-eastern France
- Plaine-Haute, a commune in the Côtes-d'Armor department in Brittany in northwestern France
- Plaine Morte Glacier, a glacier in the canton of Bern in Switzerland
- Belle Plaine (disambiguation)
- La Plaine (disambiguation)

== See also ==
- Plain (disambiguation)
