= Planar =

Planar is an adjective meaning "relating to a plane (geometry)".

Planar may also refer to:

== Science and technology ==
- Planar (computer graphics), computer graphics pixel information from several bitplanes
- Planar (transmission line technologies), transmission lines with flat conductors
- Planar, the structure resulting from the planar process used in the manufacture of semiconductor devices, such as planar transistors
- Planar graph, graph that can be drawn in the plane so that no edges cross
- Planar mechanism, a system of parts whose motion is constrained to a two-dimensional plane
- Planar Systems, an Oregon-headquartered manufacturer of digital displays
- Zeiss Planar, photographic lens designed by Paul Rudolph at Carl Zeiss in 1896

== See also ==
- List of planar symmetry groups
- Planarity, a computer puzzle game
- Plane (disambiguation)
- Planer (disambiguation)
