= Planer =

The term planer may refer to several types of carpentry tools, woodworking machines or metalworking machine tools.

- Plane (tool), a hand tool used to produce flat surfaces by shaving the surface of the wood
- Thickness planer (North America) or thicknesser (UK and Australia), a woodworking machine for making boards of even thickness
- Planer (metalworking), a metalworking machine-tool having a reciprocating work table and a stationary cutting tool
- Jointer (North America) or planer (UK, Canada, and Australia), a woodworking machine for making flat surfaces and straight edges on boards

== Surname ==
- Minna Planer (1809-1866) Saxonian actress
- Franz Planer (1894-1963), cinematographer who moved to the U.S. in the 1930s
- Nigel Planer (born 1953) English actor, comedian, novelist and playwright

== See also ==
- Planar (disambiguation)
- Planner (disambiguation)
