= SBB Ee 3/3 IV =

Swiss shunting locomotive

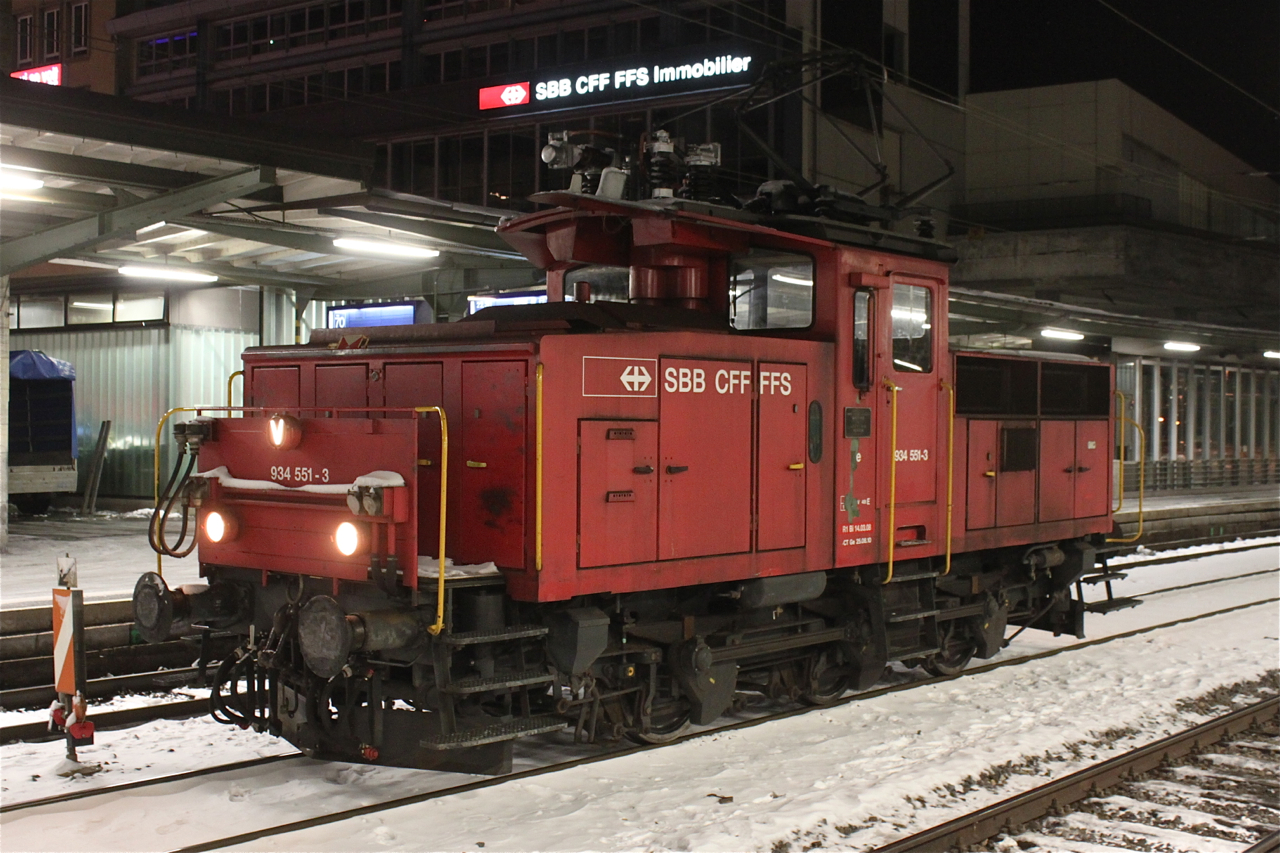
- Ee 3/3 IV in Lausanne
Type and origin
- Power type: Electric
- Builder: Swiss Locomotive and Machine Works; Société Anonyme des Ateliers de Sécheron
- Build date: 1962-1963
- Total produced: 10
Specifications
- Configuration
  - Whyte: 0-6-0OE
  - UIC: C
- Gauge: 1,435 mm (4 ft 8 1/2 in)
- Length
  - Over buffers: 10.02 m (32 ft 10 in)
- Electric system/s: 15 kV 16.7 Hz AC; 25 kV AC; 3,000 V DC; 1,500 V DC
Performance figures
- Maximum speed: 60 km/h (37 mph)
- Power output
  - 1 hour: 390 kW (520 hp) (at 24 km/h (15 mph))
- Tractive effort
  - Starting: 118 kN (27,000 lbf)
  - 1 hour: 58 kN (13,000 lbf)
Career
- Operators: Swiss Federal Railways
- Numbers: 16551–16560 (pre-1994); Ee 934 551–560 (post-1994)

The Ee 3/3^{IV}, the fourth iteration of the Ee 3/3 series, is a class of ten shunting locomotives specially designed for use as pilots at border stations. The complicated equipment needed for four different electrical systems required a higher and wider body in front of and behind the cab and a reduction in power. Nevertheless, thanks to a modern crank drive, a maximum speed of 60 km/h can be attained.

== History ==
The Ee 3/3^{IV} are used in French and Italian border stations, mostly at Geneva, on similar duty to the previous versions. All locomotives were equipped with a multiple drive in 1994, similar to the Ee 3/3^{II}. During the upgrade the locomotives received new service numbers (Ee 934).

Due to their ability to run on 1,500 V DC system, they were occasionally used to haul passenger trains between La Plaine and Geneva when the SBB BDe 4/4 II were being repaired.

== Preservations ==
- Ee 934 555-4 preserved by Association pour la Préservation du Matériel Ferroviaire Savoyard (APMFS) from Chambéry
- Ee 934 556-2 preserved by Association pour la Préservation du Matériel Ferroviaire Savoyard (APMFS) from Chambéry
- Ee 934 553-9 preserved by Association pour la Préservation du Matériel Ferroviaire Savoyard (APMFS) from Chambéry

== See also ==
- List of stock used by Swiss Federal Railways
- Swiss Federal Railways
