= SBB BDe 4/4 II =

Swiss electric multiple unit

SBB BDe 4/4^{II}
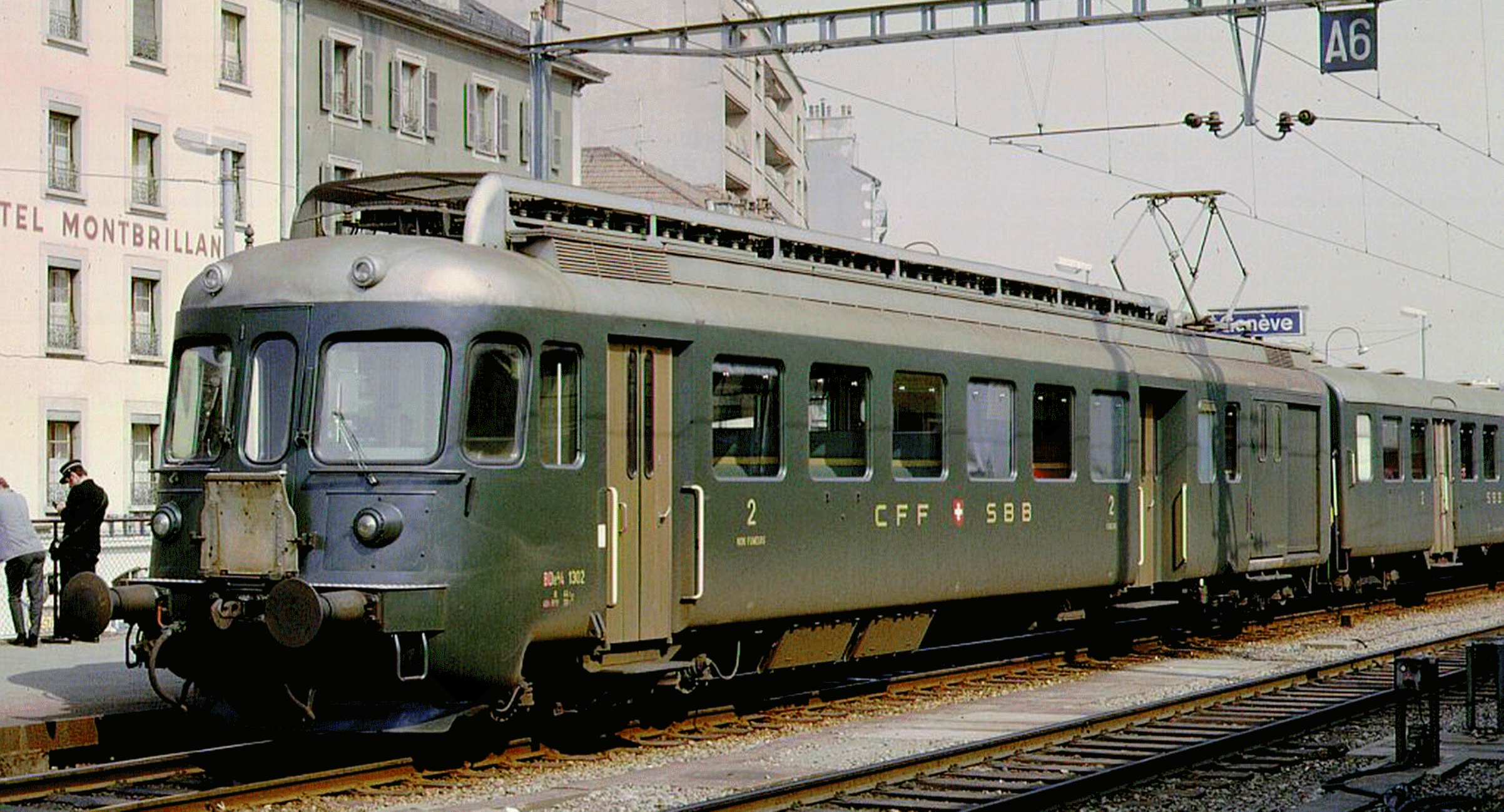
- At Geneva
- Stock type: Electric multiple unit
- In service: 1956–1995
- Manufacturers: SWS, SAAS
- Entered service: 1956–1957
- Number built: 2
- Successor: SBB Bem 550
- Formation: 3 cars per trainset (typical); 2-4 cars per trainset (design)
- Fleet numbers: 1956: 881–882; 1963: 1301–1302
- Operator: Swiss Federal Railways

Specifications
- Maximum speed: 100 km/h (62 mph)
- Power output: 1,090 kW (1,460 hp)
- Electric systems: 1,500 V DC
- Track gauge: 1,435 mm (4 ft 8 1/2 in)

The BDe 4/4^{II} were motorcar electric multiple units built in the 1950s for the Swiss Federal Railway for service on the La Plaine - Geneva line. The line was not electrified to Swiss standard (15 kV 16 2/3 Hz AC), but to the southeastern French 1.5 kV DC standard, so most Swiss rolling stock could not be used. They retired from operation in 1995.

== Background ==
Geneva, lying in southwestern Switzerland, is linked by rail to the French national railway system. The links include main lines to Lyon, but also smaller lines to Annecy and, through France, to Saint-Gingolph and Saint-Maurice. Consequently, the SBB needed a way to cope with the regional French electrification standard of the time, 1.5 kV DC, for transport of French mainline trains from the French border to Geneva, as well as for excursion trains that ran to various local French destinations from Geneva itself. The BDe 4/4^{II} (then classified BFe 4/4^{II}) was the solution to this requirement, though it was a straightforward extension of available technology.

== Technical Characteristics ==
The trainsets consisted of a power car and a driving trailer, serving as the ends to each train. They could be expanded by up to two additional light steel passenger cars with driving control lines passing through them. The pneumatic car doors were operated by switches in the driver's cabs. Floors of the drivers cabs and baggage compartment were oak. Departure could be signalled to the driver by the station manager via exterior buttons on the sides of the lead cars.

Each trainset had four bogies. They had type "R" (rapid) compressed air brakes acting on each bogie, and a manual brake located at the drivers' consoles that acted on the end bogies. There was also an electrical brake using roof-mounted resistor banks. Top speed was 100 km/h (62 mph) on gradients of 12‰ with a 120 t load, though they usually ran at 70 km/h (43 mph) due to the short distances involved. Loads up to 150 t were possible with the extra passenger cars.

The unpowered bogies on the driving trailer were identical to those used in the light steel passenger cars. The outermost axles of the railcar had graphite flange lubricators. The powered bogies had nose-mounted traction motors with a 1:3.94 gearing ratio to the axles. The motors could operate in series or series-parallel. Electrical braking was achieved by motor self-excitation assisted by the onboard generator.

The throttle was a wheel with settings to engage the motors in series at low speeds and then in series-parallel at higher speeds. Turning the wheel the opposite direction engaged the electrical brake with increasing force.

Control circuits operated at 36 V DC. They controlled the throttle's electropneumatic contactors for the throttle, and resistor sets for electrical braking.

The railcars were equipped with SNCF-standard safety systems for their use on French railways.

== Operation ==
The two special EMUs were delivered in 1956 and 1957 as BFe 4/4^{II} class numbers 881 and 882. In 1961 they were renumbered 1301 and 1302 and in 1963 reclassified to BDe 4/4^{II}. They ran in three car trainsets with a light steel carriage.

The BDe 4/4^{II}s were underpowered and prone to frequent break downs, leading to them to often spending time in the workshop under repair. To maintain the service, the CFF had to use unusual solutions including diesel haulage. Due to extensive electrification, the CFF does not possess many diesel locos. The first choice was Am 4/4, (former DB V 200 class) but these too were unreliable, forcing the occasional use of shunting locomotives, such as the diesel Em 3/3, or the quadruple voltage electric Ee 3/3 IV. None of these locomotives permitted train heating, which was a problem in winter. In 1980, a light steel coach (B 50 85 29-30 503) was fitted with a pantograph and switchgear to solve the problem.

In 1995, the la Plaine – Geneva service was upgraded and branded Rhône Express Régional. After nearly 40 years of service, the BDe 4/4^{II}s were retired and replaced with new, Bem 550 rolling stock.
