= Plano =

Plano may refer to:

== Native Americans ==
- Plano cultures, the Late Paleo-Indian hunter-gatherer societies of the Great Plains of North America
  - Plano point, the chipped stone tools of the Plano cultures

== Places in the United States ==
- Plano, Illinois
  - Plano (Amtrak station), train station in Plano, Illinois
- Plano, Indiana
- Plano, Iowa
- Plano, Missouri
- Plano, Ohio
- Plano, Texas

== Education in the United States ==
- Plano High School (Illinois), a high school in Plano, Illinois
- Plano Senior High School, a senior high school in Plano, Texas
- Plano Independent School District, the school district serving Plano, Texas, and surrounding cities
- University of Plano, a former liberal arts college in Plano, Texas

== People ==
- Óscar Plano (born 1991), Spanish footballer

== Other uses ==
- Plano, California, fictitious home town near San Jose, of the protagonist of Donna Tartt's novel The Secret History
