= Cities of the Plain =

Cities of the Plain or cities of the plain may refer to:

- The "cities of the plain", a group of five cities that included Sodom and Gomorrah in the Book of Genesis
- Cities of the Plain (novel), a 1998 novel by Cormac McCarthy
- Cities of the Plain, a translated title of Marcel Proust's Sodome et Gomorrhe

== See also ==
- The Sins of the Cities of the Plain, an 1881 pornographic book by "Jack Saul"
