= Plane, Tuzla =

Village in Bosnia and Herzegovina

Plane
- Village
- Location within Bosnia and Herzegovina
- Coordinates: 44.5286991°N 18.5755849°E
- Country: Bosnia and Herzegovina
- Entity: Federation of Bosnia and Herzegovina
- Canton: Tuzla
- Municipality: Tuzla

Area
  - Total: 0.90 sq mi (2.34 km^{2})

Population (2013)
  - Total: 736
  - Density: 815/sq mi (315/km^{2})
- Time zone: UTC+1 (CET)
  - Summer (DST): UTC+2 (CEST)

Plane is a village in the municipality of Tuzla, Tuzla Canton, Bosnia and Herzegovina.

== Demographics ==
According to the 2013 census, its population was 736.

Ethnicity in 2013
Ethnicity	Number	Percentage
Bosniaks	687	93.3%
Croats	4	0.5%
Serbs	1	0.1%
other/undeclared	44	6.0%
Total	736	100%
