= Plains (disambiguation) =

Plains are flat, sweeping landmasses.

Plains or The Plains may also refer to:

== Places ==
- Great Plains, sometimes simply "the Plains", in America and Canada

=== United States ===
- Plains, Georgia
- Plains, Kansas
- Plains, Michigan
- Plains, Montana
  - Plains Airport
- Plains, Pennsylvania
- Plains, Texas
- Plains, Borden County, Texas
- Plains Township, Pennsylvania
- The Plains, Ohio
- The Plains, Virginia

=== Elsewhere ===
- Plains, North Lanarkshire, Scotland
- The Plains, New South Wales, Australia
- The Plains, Western Australia, a locality in the Shire of Capel

== Other uses ==
- Plains (album), by George Winston, 1999
- Plains (band), the country music duo of Jess Williamson and Waxahatchee
- Plains Indians, indigenous tribes living on the Great Plains
- The Plains (novel), 1982 novel by Gerald Murnane

== See also ==
- Plain (disambiguation)
