= La Plaine, Geneva =

Coordinates: 46°10′40″N 6°00′04″E

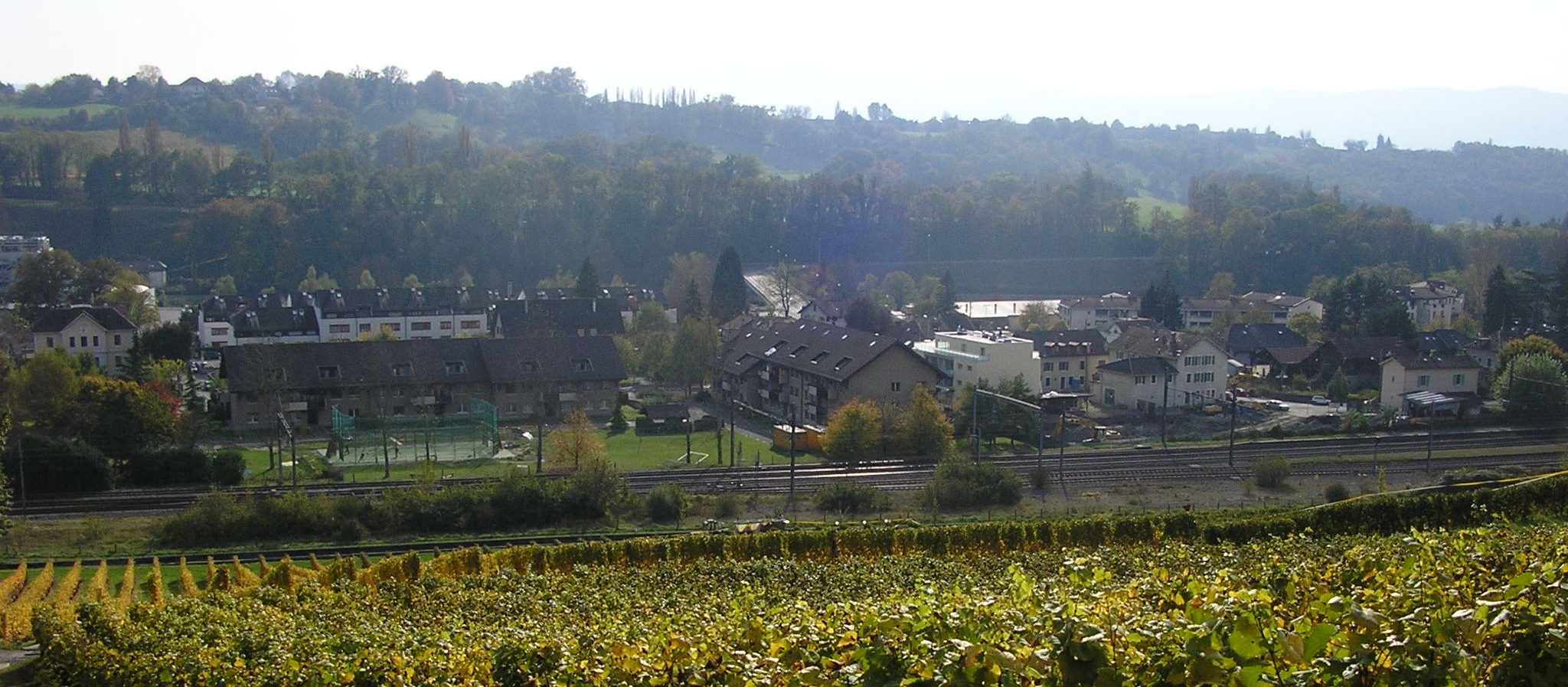
An image of La Plaine, Geneva

La Plaine is a village in Switzerland forming part of the commune of Dardagny in the canton of Geneva. On the right bank of the Rhône, it is the site of a perfume factory belonging to the Firmenich group.

== Transport ==
- La Plaine is the terminus station of Swiss Federal Railways' Rhône Express Regional service which runs twice hourly to Geneva. It is part of the Geneva public transport Unireso fare network.
- La Plaine is also served by the X and T bus lines

== Gallery ==
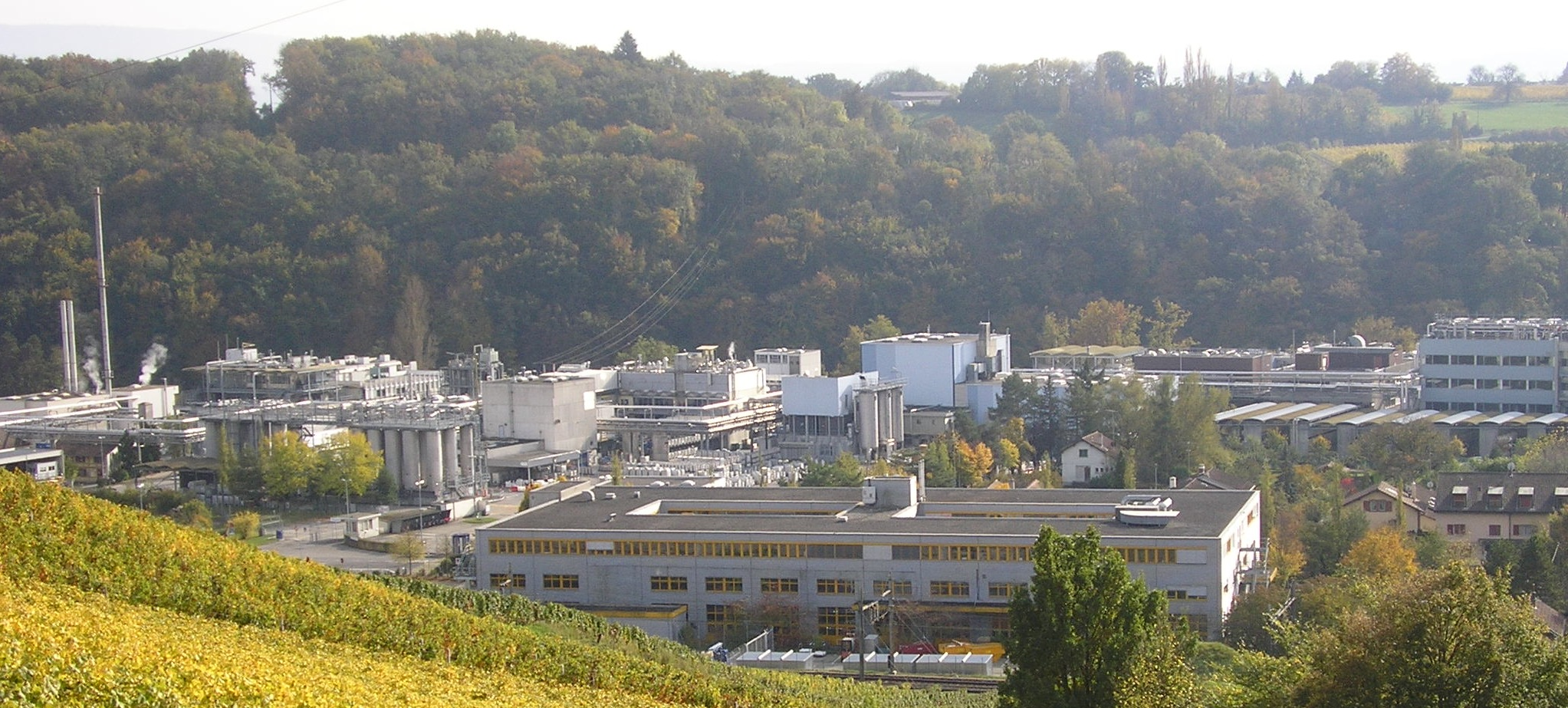
Firmenich plant

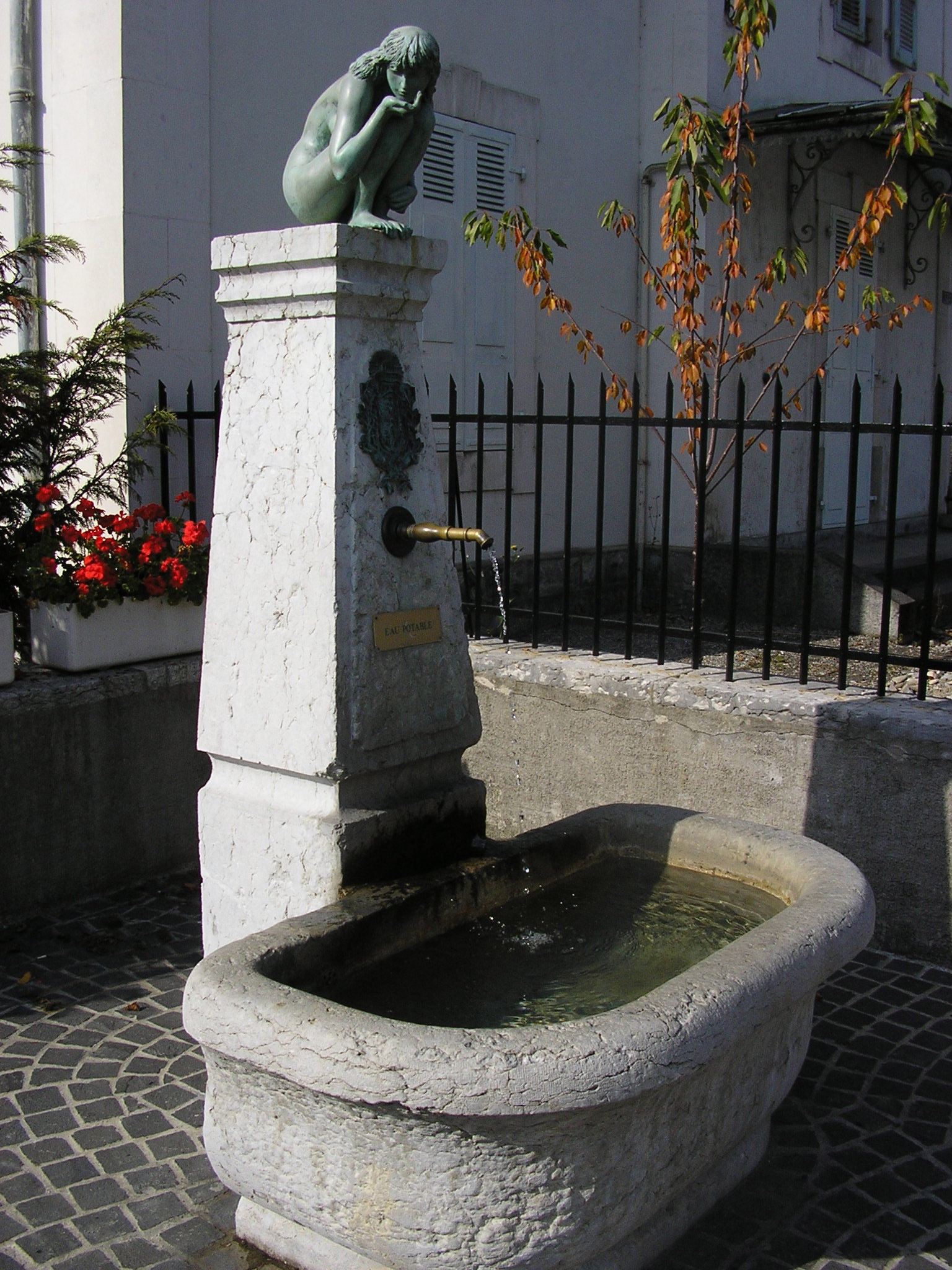
Fountain with Manon by Otto Bindschedler

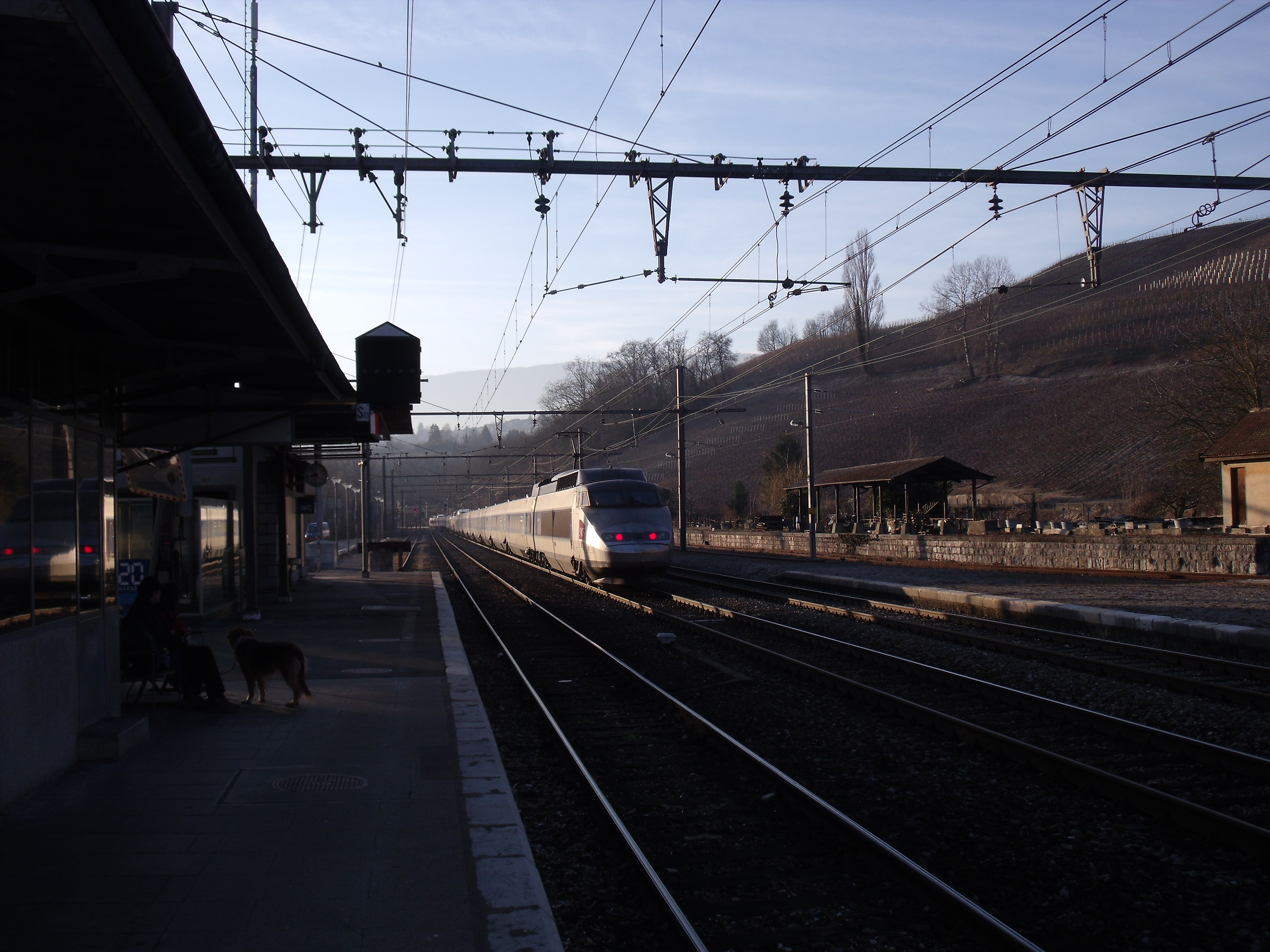
La Plaine railway station, looking SW

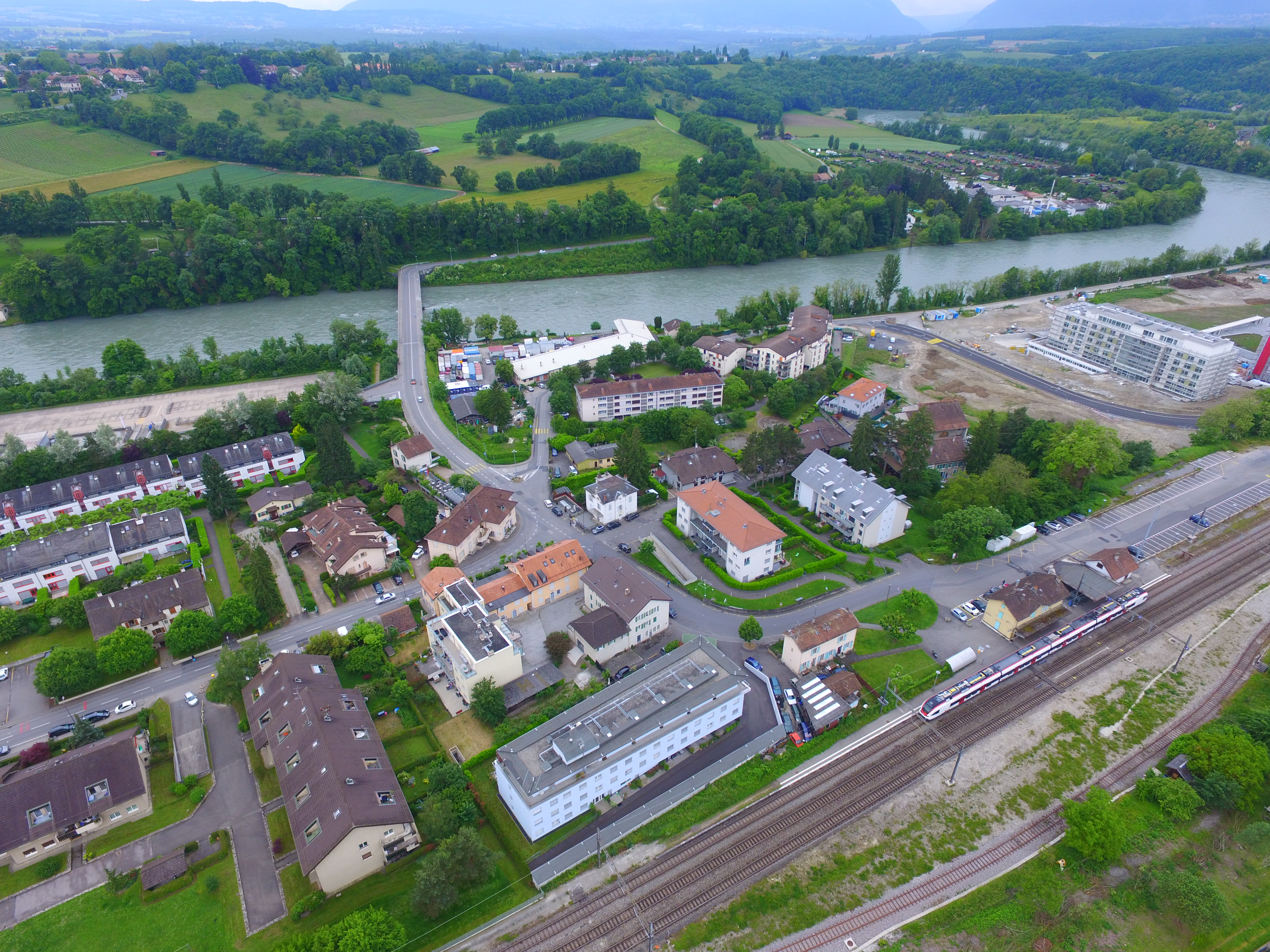
La Plaine, aerial view
