= Plain Township =

Plain Township may refer to:

- Plain Township, Kosciusko County, Indiana
- Plain Township, Renville County, North Dakota, in Renville County, North Dakota
- Plain Township, Franklin County, Ohio
- Plain Township, Stark County, Ohio
- Plain Township, Wayne County, Ohio
- Plain Township, Wood County, Ohio
