= Texas's 71st House of Representatives district =

American legislative district

Texas's 71st State House of Representatives district
Representative
Stan Lambert; R–Abilene

District 71 is a district in the Texas House of Representatives. It has been represented by Republican Stan Lambert since 2017.

== Geography ==
The district covers the counties of Callahan, Jones, Nolan and Taylor.

== Members ==
- Gary E. Thompson (until 1986)
- Robert Dean Hunter (1986–2007)
- Susan King (2007–2017)
- Stan Lambert (since 2017)
