= Abilene and Southern Railway =

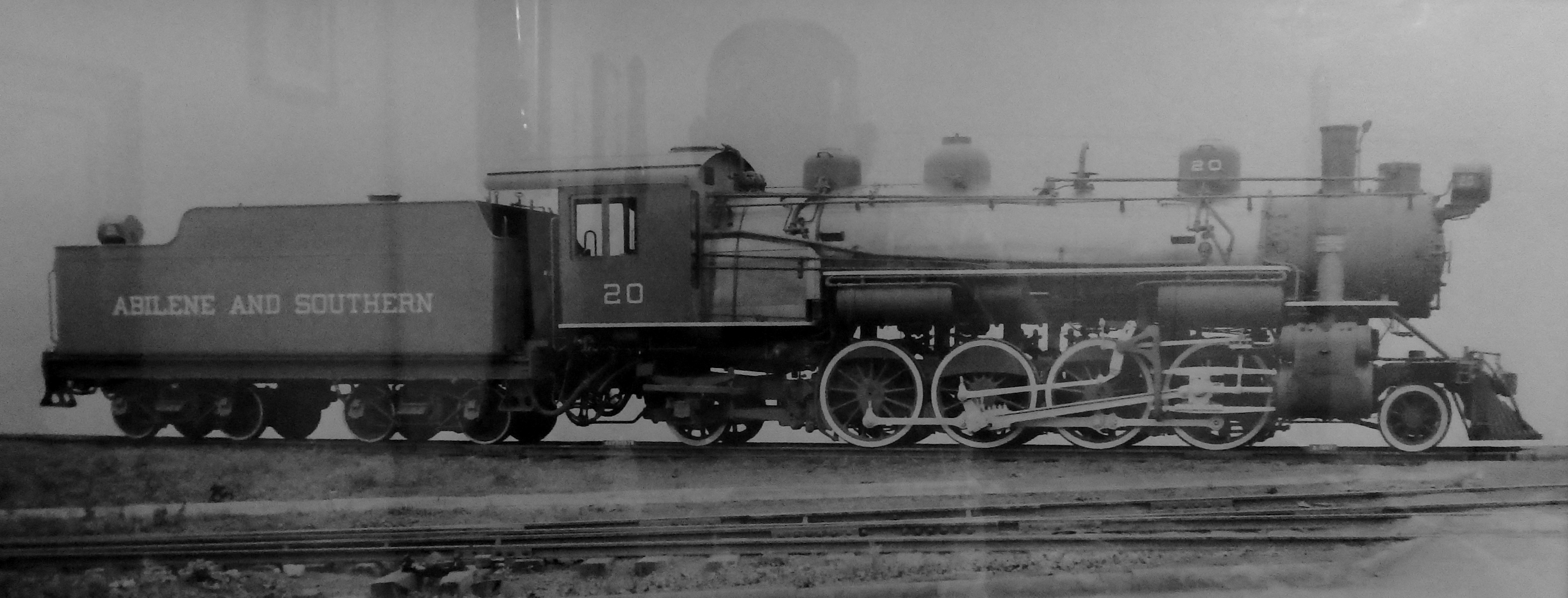
Abilene & Southern Railway Engine 20

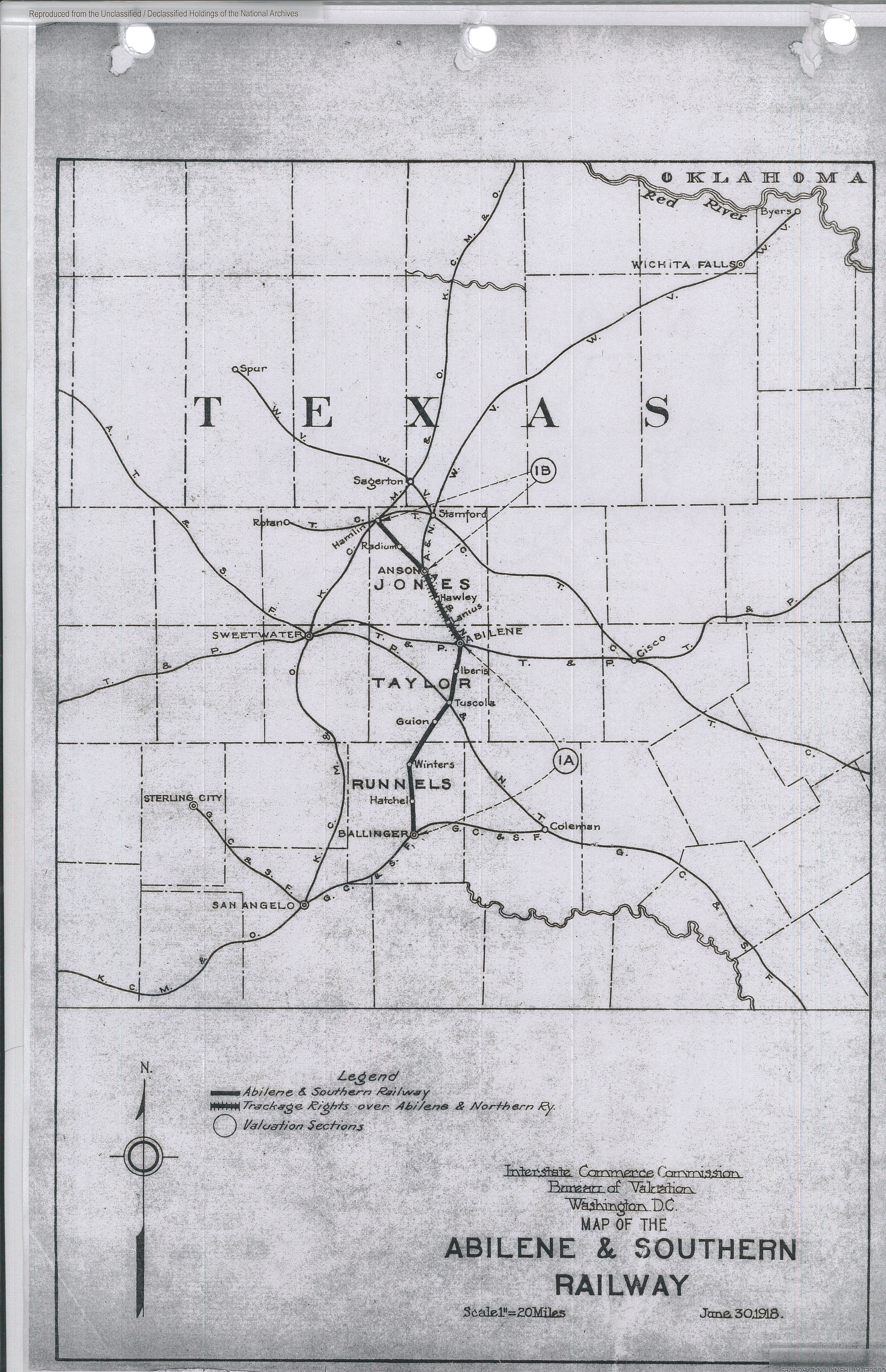
1918 map of the railroad

The Abilene and Southern Railway was a railroad company that existed from 1909 to 1978 and was eventually taken over by the Missouri Pacific Railroad.

== History ==
The Abilene and Southern Railway Company was founded on January 13, 1909, in Abilene, Texas by Morgan Jones (1839-1926). Jones proposed to construct 150 miles (240 km) of railroad. Construction work started soon and on April 23, 1909, the first official train ran the eight miles (12.9 km) from Abilene to Iberis, Texas. From September 11 the same year, the road was operating from Abilene to Ballinger, Texas, a total of 54.75 miles (88.11 km), where a connection to a branch line of the Gulf, Colorado and Santa Fe Railway was established. Finally, on October 1, 1910, a railroad from Anson, Texas to Hamlin, Texas (17.41 miles (28.02 km)) was opened. Plans for further extensions to Sonora and San Angelo, Texas were dropped soon thereafter. Between Abilene and Anson (24.62 miles (39.62 km)), the Abilene & Southern used existing tracks built in 1907 by the Abilene and Northern Railway and meanwhile operated by the Colorado and Southern Railway. The total trackage used by the Abilene & Southern was 96.78 miles (155.75 km).

On April 25, 1927, the Texas and Pacific Railway was authorized by the Interstate Commerce Commission to buy the entire stock of the Abilene & Southern which continued to operate the road. The ICC allowed abandonment of the Anson–Hamlin track including the end of the trackage rights over the railroad from Abilene to Anson on January 9, 1937, and in February that year operations north of Abilene ceased. The stretch from Winters to Ballinger (16 miles (26 km)) lost rail traffic in 1972 and was torn up. In 1976 the Texas & Pacific merged with the Missouri Pacific Railroad and the Abilene & Southern ceased to exist on November 1, 1978, when it was also merged with the Missouri Pacific. The remaining railroad from Abilene to Winters was later abandoned.

== Passenger operations ==
Before the railroad to Hamlin was opened, there was one daily train from Abilene to Ballinger. With the new road, a second train, running daily except Sunday from Hamlin to Ballinger, was inaugurated. Passenger trains ceased to use the Colorado & Southern trackage between Abilene and Anson during World War I and the Hamlin train now ran only between Anson and Hamlin. Later the link was reestablished and the Hamlin train now ran to Abilene, but the Abilene–Ballinger train was dropped on Sundays. In 1926, both trains operated as mixed train s. In December 1941 regular passenger service ended. The mixed train now ran on irregular schedule subject to freight connections. This lasted until May 1957 when the line became freight-only.
