= Stan Lambert =

Texas state legislator

Member of the Texas House of Representatives from the 71st district
- Incumbent
- Assumed office January 10, 2017
- Preceded by: Susan King

Personal details
- Born: Standard Dwight Lambert; December 21, 1952 (age 73) Abilene, Texas, US
- Party: Republican
- Education: Abilene Christian University; Southern Methodist University
- Occupation: Bank executive
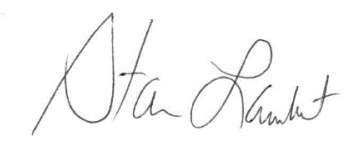
- Signature

Standard Dwight "Stan" Lambert (born December 21, 1952) is an American bank executive who is a Republican member of the Texas House of Representatives for the 71st District, which encompasses Jones, Nolan, and Taylor counties about Abilene. Lambert was sworn into the Texas House on January 10, 2017, after he won the general election held on November 8, 2016.

Lambert was previously a member of the board of directors of the Abilene Independent School District.

In the general election held on November 6, 2018, Lambert won his second House term. With 38,430 votes (70.1 percent), he defeated the Democratic candidate, Sam Hatton, who polled 10,792 21.9 percent). In the 2024 primaries for Republican State Representative in Texas District 71 held on March 5, 2024, he defeated Republican Liz Case, in a narrow 48 to 52 percent margin.

Texas House of Representatives
Preceded by Susan King	Texas State Representative for District 71 (Jones, Nolan and Taylor counties); 2017–	Succeeded by Incumbent
