= KGXL =

KGXL may refer to:

- KGXL (FM), a radio station (103.5 FM) licensed to serve Taylor, Arizona, United States; see List of radio stations in Arizona
- KORQ, a radio station (96.1 FM) licensed to serve Winter, Texas, United States, which held the call sign KGXL from 2007 to 2010
- KFOX (AM), a radio station (1650 AM) licensed to serve Torrance, California, United States, which held the call sign KGXL in 1998 and from 1999 to 2000
