= Jane Gilmore Rushing =

A biography of Rushing by Lou Halsell Rodenberger.

Jane Gilmore Rushing (November 15, 1925 – July 4, 1997) was an American novelist and journalist, who was a staff writer for the Abilene Reporter-News in Abilene, Texas.

== Books ==
- Walnut Grove. Doubleday, New York (1964). OCLC 1379605
- Against the Moon. Doubleday, Garden City, New York (1968). LCCN 68014166 (Expanded from Rushing's original story published in The Virginia Quarterly Review, 37: 3 (Summer, 1961), 378-383.)
- Geh Schlafen, Mein Herz, es ist Zeit: Familienroman aus Texas. Christian Wegner Verlag, Hamburg (1969). ASIN B0026O9O50
- Tamzen. Doubleday, Garden City, New York (1972). ISBN 0385012004
- Mary Dove: A Love Story. Doubleday, Garden City, New York (1974). ISBN 0385083025, ISBN 0896725030, ISBN 9780896725034
- Evolution of a University: Texas Tech's First Fifty Years. With Kline A. Nall. Madrona Press, Austin, Texas (1975). ISBN 0890520178, ISBN 9780890520178
- The Raincrow. Doubleday, Garden City, New York (1977). ISBN 0385130597
- Covenant of Grace: A Novel of Anne Hutchinson. Doubleday, Garden City, New York (1982). ISBN 038517702X
- Winds of Blame. Doubleday, Garden City, New York (1983). ISBN 0385177011
- Starting from Pyron. With photographs by Billie Roche Barnard; introduction by A.C. Greene. Texas Tech University Press, Lubbock, Texas (1992). ISBN 089672283X, ISBN 9780896722835

== Awards and honors ==
- Inducted into the Texas Institute of Arts and Letters, 1969.
