= Abilene Zoological Gardens =

Abilene Zoo
- Zoo logo

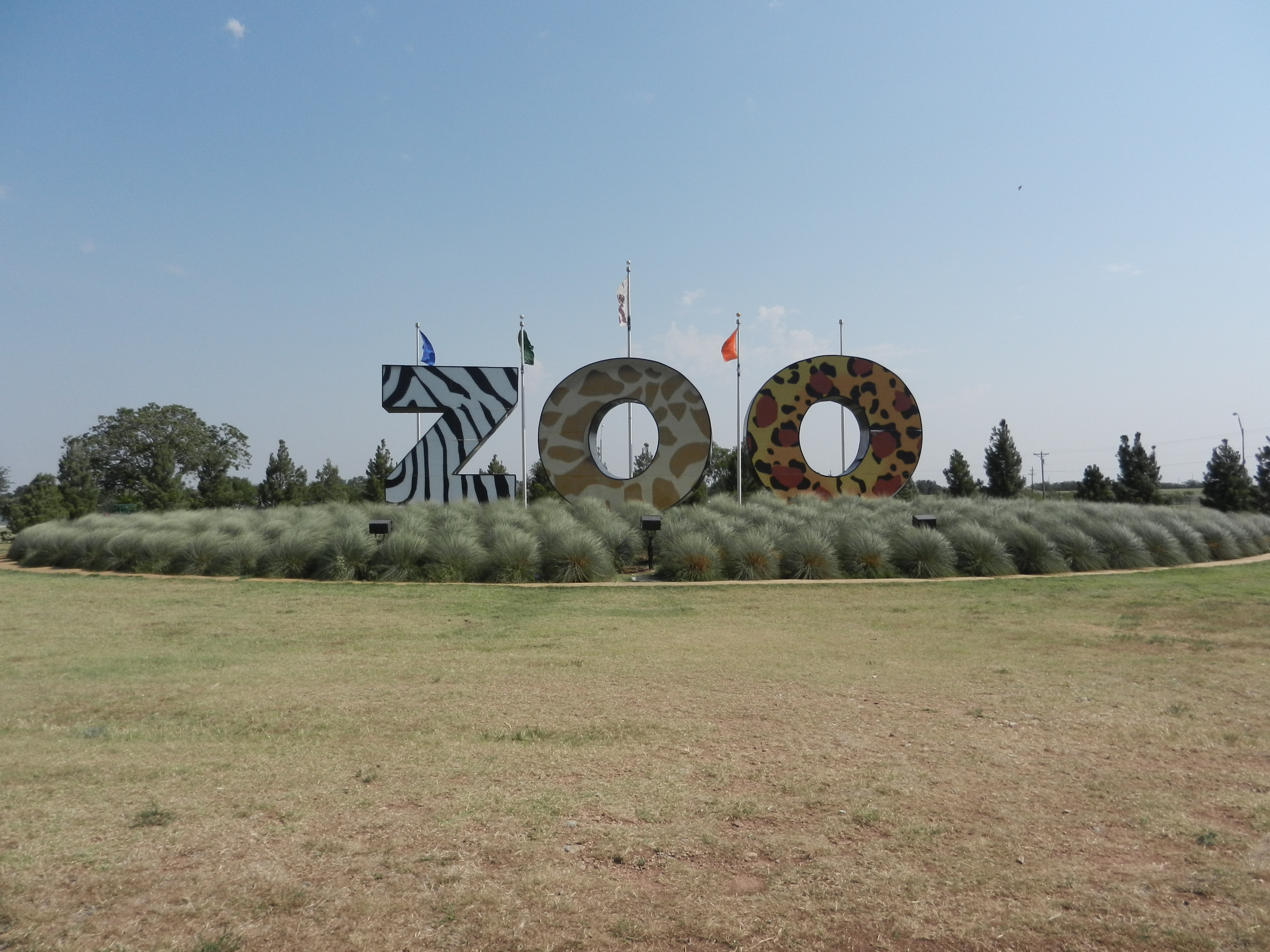
- Abilene zoo large entrance sign
- Interactive map of Abilene Zoo
- 32°26′10″N 99°41′31″W
- Date opened: 1966
- Location: 2070 Zoo Ln; Abilene, Texas, United States
- Land area: 16 acres (6.5 ha)
- No. of animals: 1100
- No. of species: >250
- Annual visitors: 224,805 (2013); 226,919 (2014)
- Memberships: AZA
- Owner: City of Abilene
- Director: Jesse Pottebaum (2019–present)
- Website: abilenezoo.org

The Abilene Zoo is a 16-acre (6.5 ha) zoo located in Abilene, Texas, United States. The zoo has over 800 animals representing over 175 species. Attendance for 2021 was 255,000.

Abilene zoo has been an accredited member of the Association of Zoos and Aquariums (AZA) since 1985. The zoo participates in the AZA Reciprocal Admissions Program, allowing members to obtain free or reduced admissions at many other American zoos.

The zoo is funded by the City of Abilene and the Abilene Zoological Society, a 501(c)(3) non-profit.

== History ==
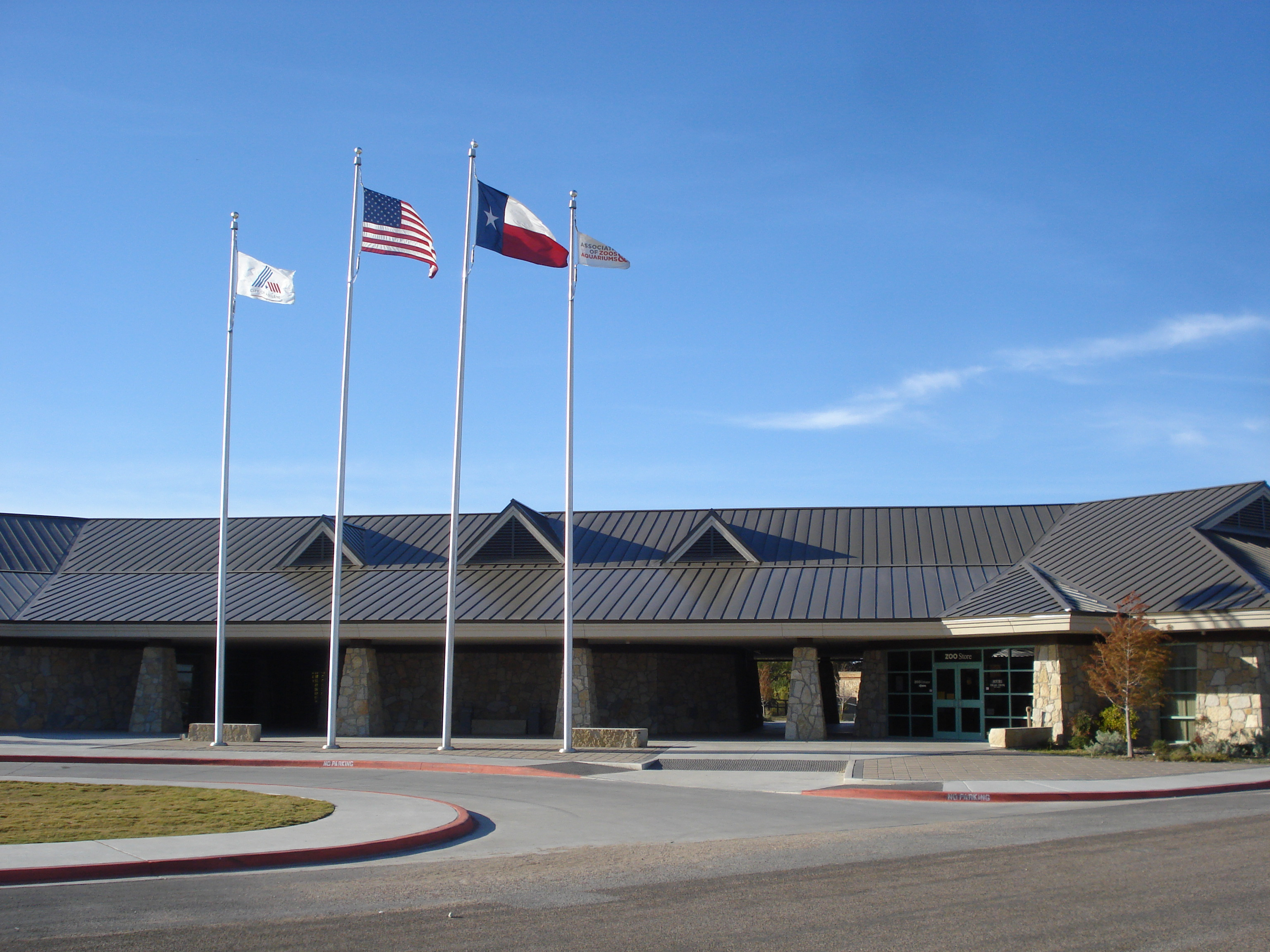
Zoo's entrance

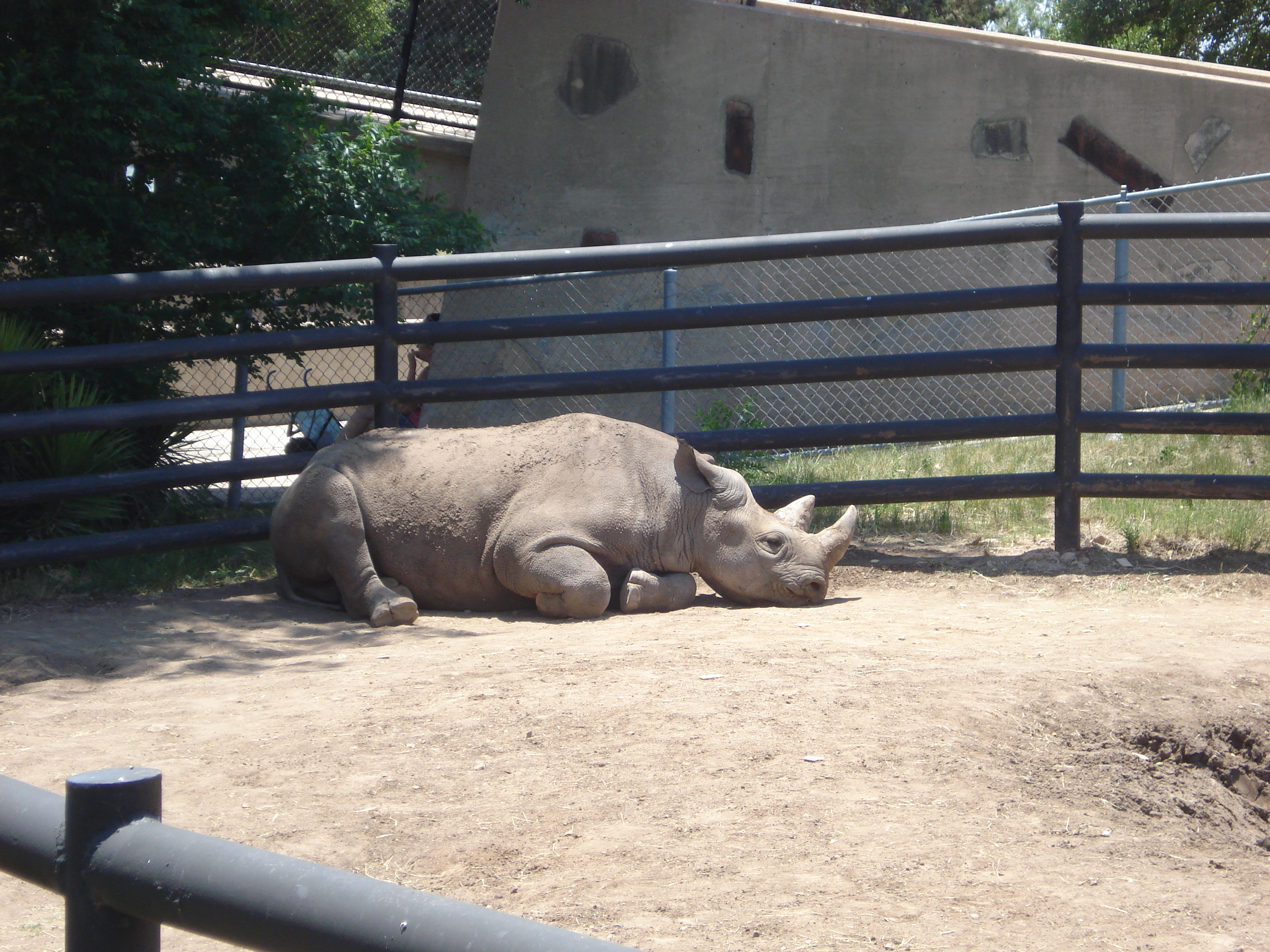
One of Abilene's two former residential black rhinos

The original Abilene Zoological Gardens was built in Fair Park in 1919. Today residents of Abilene know that park as Rose Park. In 1963, the Abilene Zoological Society was formed to support and raise funds for a new larger Zoo at a completely new location. A massive public campaign unused. The city's former airport was selected as the new location. A 39-acre piece of land. In fact the Zoo's new parking lot was once the airport's runway, where Charles Lindbergh and Amelia Earhart once landed their planes. Private citizens donated animals, equipment, resources, and even purchased the Abilene Zoo an elephant. On July 2, 1966, the Abilene Zoo officially opened its gates at their new location, Grover Nelson Park on Abilene's east side.

In 1985, the zoo first received accreditation from the Association of Zoos and Aquariums (AZA).

In 2006, $1.1 million was raised through a bond issue for zoo improvements. This bond funded converting part of the Discovery Center into the Creepy Crawly Center, expansions to the giraffe exhibit and the parking lot, and creating a South American Trails exhibit, the Wetlands Boardwalk, and the Elm Creek Backyard exhibit.

In 2007, one of the zoos elephants died at age 49 amidst some controversy over conditions for the elephants at the zoo, and the other was sent to the Cameron Park Zoo in Waco, Texas. The elephant exhibit was then turned into an exhibit for black rhinoceroses. The new $3.7 million Adventure Center (visitor services, administration, and education, all privately funded) and the new Creepy Crawler Center were also opened in 2007.

In 2009, the Elm Creek Backyard exhibit was completed with funds from the 2006 bond issue plus a $525,000 grant from the Grover Nelson Foundation.

In 2013, a new Caribbean Cove section opened, featuring exotic birds, reptiles, and mammals from Caribbean countries.

In 2016, one of the Zoo's most iconic habitats opened. Giraffe Safari redefined the giraffe habitat. Allowing Abilene Zoo visitors a chance to feed and get nose to nose with giraffe. Along with new habitats that visitors must pass on their way up to the feeding deck.

In 2021, the Zoo opened Journey to Madagascar. This new area featured lemurs, fossa, reptiles, and birds.

In the spring of 2022, the Zoo announced a ten-year master plan had been completed. The Zoo stated that the plan would open in four sperate phases. The habitats would feature new lions, rhinoceros, and wide open savanna habitats. The expansion will grow the Zoo from 16 to 39 acres, the largest expansion since 1966. The Zoo announced the addition of new species such as meerkats, pygmy hippopotamus, cheetah, wildebeest, and bison. The announcement also included a new train ride, play area, concert venue, restaurant, and renovations to current habitats. The cost of the plan was not announced.

=== Zoo history timeline ===
This is a selected list of when buildings and exhibits were created:

- 1919: Original zoo built in Fair Park, now Rose Park.
- 1963: Abilene Zoological Society formed to support and raise funds.
- 1966: New zoo opened in Grover Nelson Park.
- 1973: The zoo became a participant in the International Species Inventory System. First docent program started.
- 1975: Education Building opened.
- 1981: Pair of young African elephants arrived.
- 1982: Avian Reproduction Center completed.
- 1983: Native plant exhibit opened. World's first successful captive breeding of Wirot's pit viper.
- 1984: World's first successful breeding of Storr's monitor. Inaugural Zoo Day held.
- 1985: First accreditation from the American Association of Zoological Parks. First successful zoo breeding of Mottled rock rattlesnake.
- 1987: ARC Reserve Aviary completed. Road renamed 'Zoo Lane'. First successful breeding of African bush vipers in the world.
- 1989: The Monarch Project recognized the zoo as the first monarch butterfly sanctuary east of the Rocky Mountains.
- 1991: Discovery Center opened.
- 1994: Wetlands Exhibit completed. 1960s aviary renovated.
- 1995: Twenty-four more acres incorporated into the zoo's perimeter. Night keeper hired so security is around the clock.
- 1996: Jaguar and ocelot exhibits opened. Construction began on the new mammal holding/quarantine building. Inaugural Zoo Serenade with Abilene Philharmonic Orchestra.
- 1997: During construction, Tanya the African elephant was sent to Caldwell Zoo. Leadership Abilene raised $30,000 for a new female giraffe. The leaf-mimic gecko bred for the first time here.
- 1998: Tanya returned from the Caldwell Zoo. Tanzy the African elephant arrived from the Oklahoma City Zoo.
- 1999: Zoo joined the Attwater's Prairie Chicken Restoration Project.
- 2000: Meerkats and black bears added. The lone polar bear loaned to the Detroit Zoo.
- 2001: Bear and hyena exhibits renovated.
- 2006: Voters approved $1.1 bond for zoo improvements.
- 2007: Construction completed on the Adventure Center Complex. Creepy Crawler Center opened. Tanya the African elephant sent to the Cameron Park Zoo.
- 2008: Black rhinos added to the animal collection. Maned Wolf exhibit completed and received a non-breeding pair of wolves.
- 2009: Wetlands Boardwalk Exhibit series opened. Male white tiger received from Busch Gardens.
- 2010: Elm Creek Backyard Exhibit Series and the Ocelot Exhibit opened. Renovations completed on the veterinary clinic and commissary. Inaugural Zoobilation fundraiser was held, which included serving alcohol at an event for the first time.
- 2011: Dr. Jane Goodall visited. Construction completed on the new Flamingo Barn. Construction completed on the Bird Gardens. Diversity Gardens was completed. First maned wolf pup successfully born and parent-raised.
- 2012: South American Pampas exhibit opened. Train Station completed.
- 2013: Caribbean Cove series of exhibits constructed.
- 2015: Voters approved $1.03 million to go along with $1.2 million raised privately for zoo improvements. Carousel added.
- 2016: Giraffe Safari habitat opened
- 2016: Boo at the Zoo began its annual celebration
- 2018: Christmas Celebration began its annual celebration
- 2021: Wild Days launched for Spring Break, offering conservation based shows host by Clay Carabajal
- 2021: Journey to Madagascar opened
- 2022: The Abilene Zoo announced a ten-year master plan.
- 2023: ABQ BioPark Zoo's African lion siblings, Kenya and Dixie, move into the empty exhibit that was temporarily home to the Fort Worth Zoo's African lions.
- 2025: African lion siblings, Kenya and Dixie, relocate to Tautphaus Park's zoo in Idaho Falls, Idaho.

== Exhibits ==
=== Giraffe Safari ===
This exhibit includes a bridge crossing over it which allows visitors to pet and feed the giraffes. Construction began on a new $3.8 million Giraffe Safari exhibit, and opened in April 2016. The new exhibit doubled the size of the old habitat, and includes the zoo's new male giraffe and two females. This section also features other African mammals including striped hyenas, Grant's zebras, a southern black rhinoceros (also known as south-central black rhinoceros) and lions.

=== Caribbean Cove ===
This exhibit displays wildlife from South America, such as macaws, monkeys, and assorted amphibians. It also includes a large sand area for kids, while their parents take a break at the nearby tables and chairs.

=== Reptile House ===
The zoo's herpetarium, opened in December 2007 in what was part of the Discovery Center. The exhibit was designed and built by the zoo's management and staff, and contains 50 naturalistic exhibits with 80 species of reptiles and amphibians.

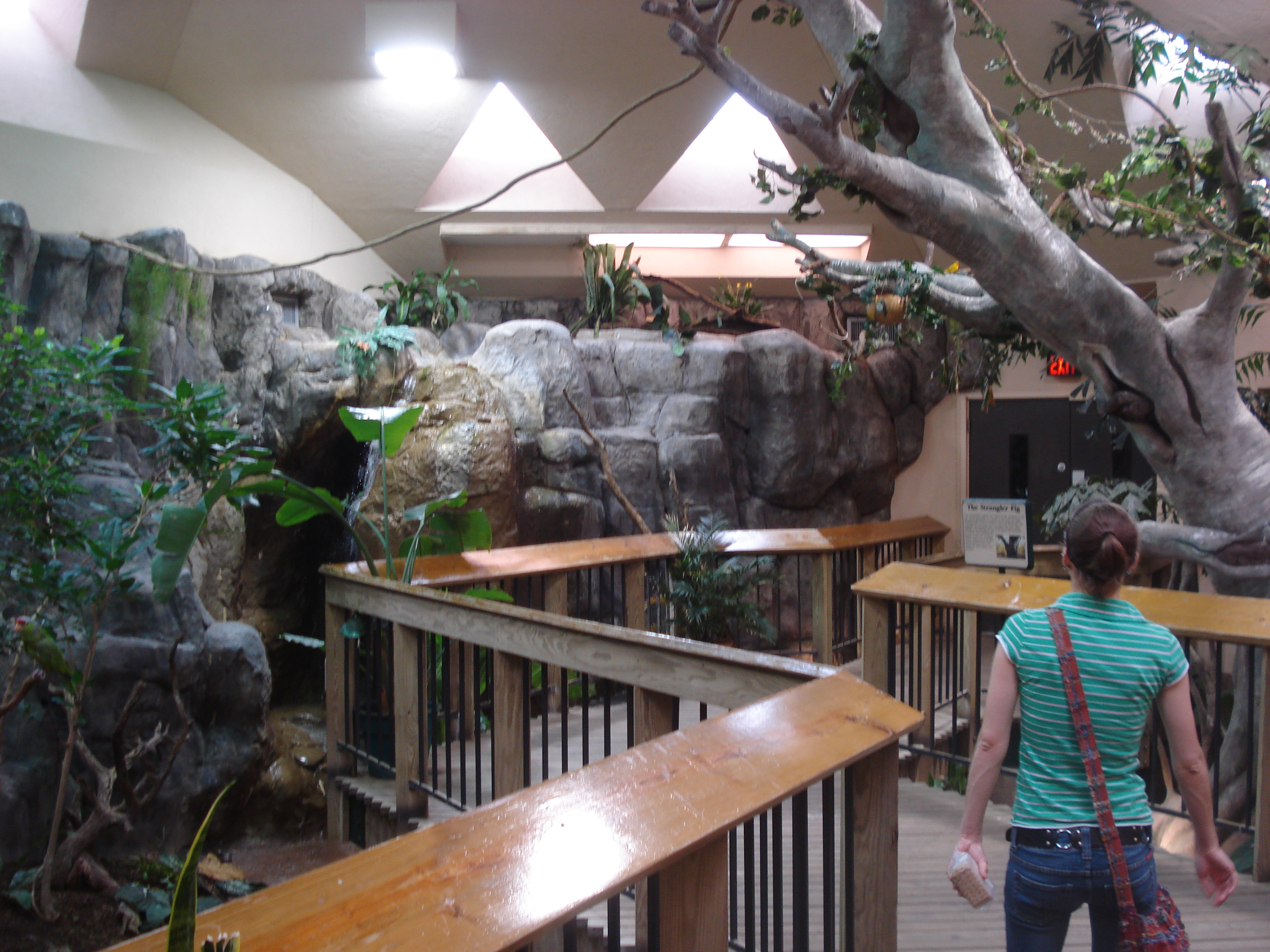
The Tropical Aviary

Also part of the Discovery center, the Tropical Aviary is a climate controlled indoor aviary that is home to the zoos tropical birds. The zoo also has Bird Gardens which house other birds in its possession.

=== Elm Creek Backyard ===
Completed in 2009, this area houses species native to the Elm Creek area of Texas, including cougars, coyotes, porcupines, raccoons, bobcats, ringtails, armadillos, skunks, and river otters, as well as some birds, fish, reptiles, and amphibians.

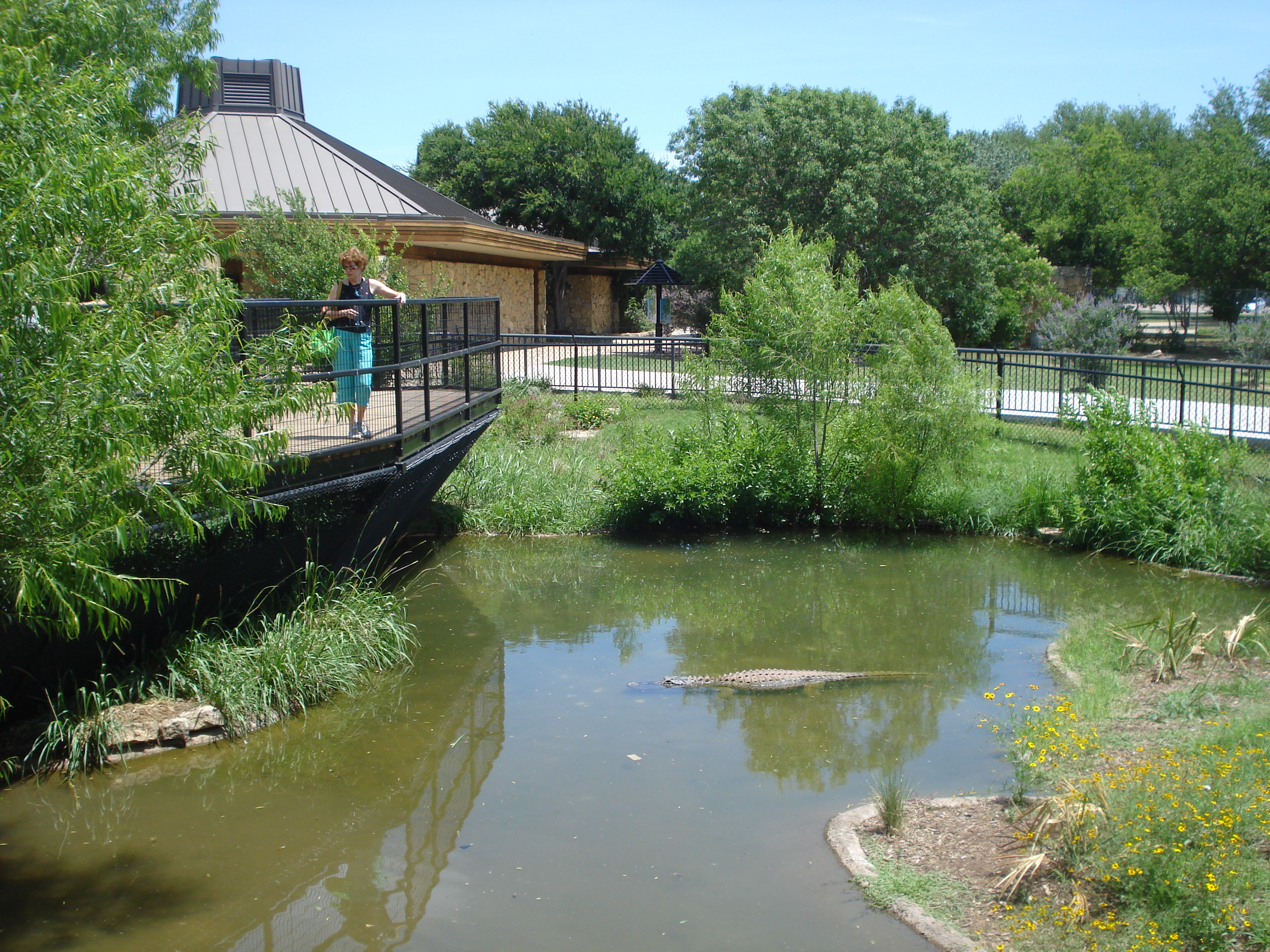
The Wetlands Boardwalk

=== Wetlands of the Americas ===
An elevated boardwalk that lets visitors get a close look at animals that inhabit the wetlands exhibits at the zoo. The various wetlands exhibits are home to a variety of wetland dwellers including alligators, flamingos, waterfowl, and Attwater's prairie chicken.

=== Nakuru Lagoon ===
This $300,000 project opened in March 2018. As soon as guests walk through the gate, they'll see this new exhibit, which houses African birds: lesser flamingos and yellow-billed ducks.

== Other facilities ==
The Adventure Center, which opened in 2007, is a 12,000-square-foot (1,115 m^{2}) complex that includes admissions, customer relations, and a gift shop, as well as administrative offices and classrooms that can hold up to 150 people.

== The future ==
The current master plan, developed by Parkhill, a Texas-based Architecture and Engineering firm, created in 2022 includes four phases. The first three phases build out on 23 acres of undeveloped zoo property to the North of the current zoo. Cost of the new master plan has yet to be released. In summer 2022, a news story unveiled additional growth for the zoo. Adding newly acquired land adjacent to the undeveloped 23 acres. The newly added land totals 18 acres and the zoo announced plans to convert it into a native grassland habitat and wetland, featuring American bison and pronghorn antelope.
