= Enterprise Tower =

First State Bank Tower and then Bank of America Building

The Enterprise
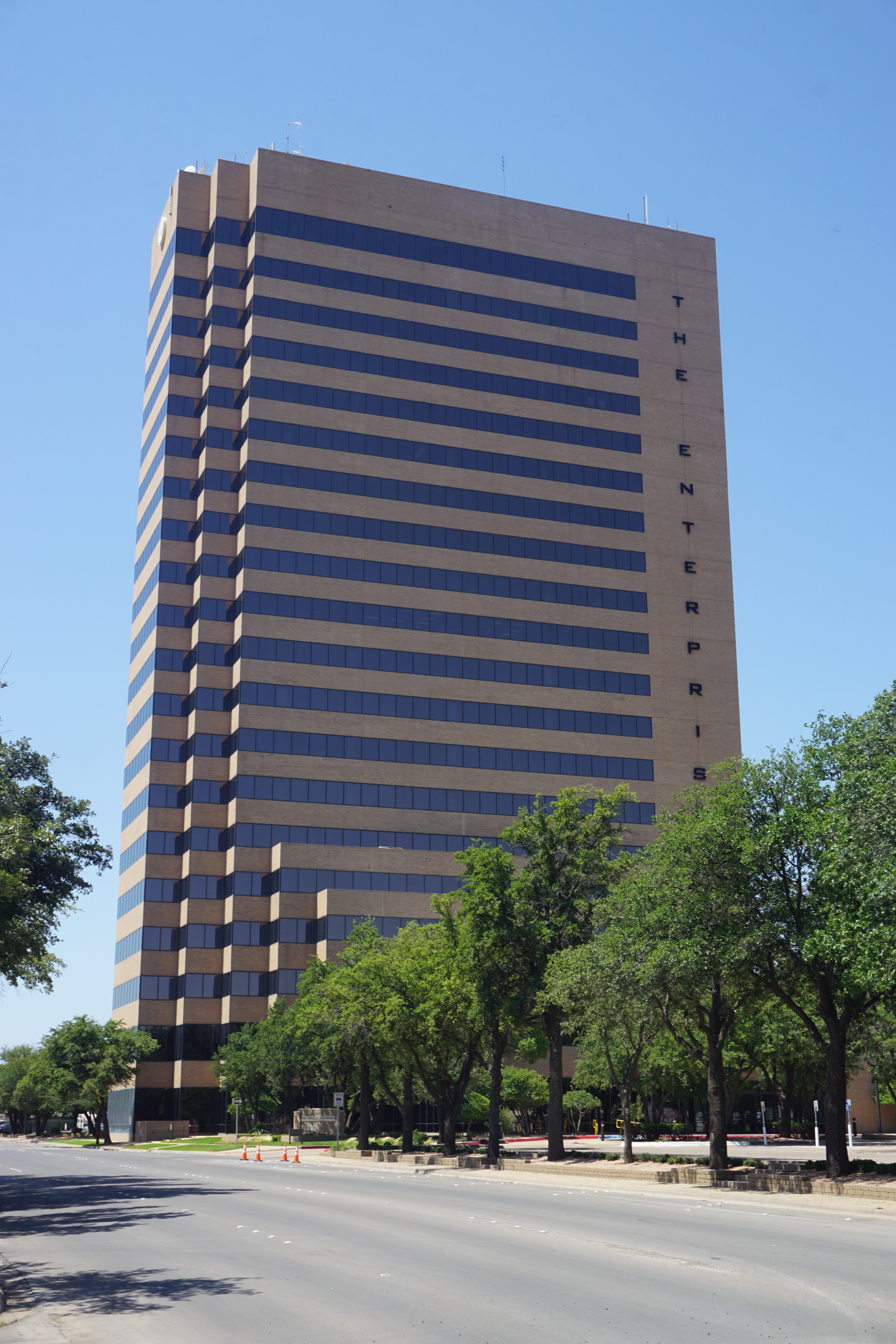
- Ground view of The Enterprise

Record height
- Preceded by: Hotel Wooten
- Surpassed by: Present

General information
- Status: Completed
- Type: highrise, offices
- Location: 500 Chestnut St; Abilene
- Coordinates: 32.4441473°N 99.7352076°W
- Completed: 1984
- Owner: LMB Real Estate Group

Height
- Roof: 285 ft (87 m)

Technical details
- Floor count: 20
- Floor area: 12,670 sq ft (1,177 m^{2})

Design and construction
- Architect: 3D/International

Other information
- Parking: Reserved

The Enterprise is a highrise located in Abilene, Texas originally known as the First State Bank Tower and then Bank of America Building. It was constructed in the early 80s and completed by 1984. This is the tallest building in the city at 20 stories, 285 feet (87 m), and 6th tallest in West Texas. The building is located at 500 Chestnut St. next to the Taylor County Courthouse.

The office tower was purchased by John Hancock Mutual Life in January 1990 for about $8 million. In June 2015, Cardinal Energy Group moved its headquarters from Dublin, Ohio, to the building.

== See also ==
- List of tallest buildings in Texas
