= Abilene, Texas =

Abilene
- City
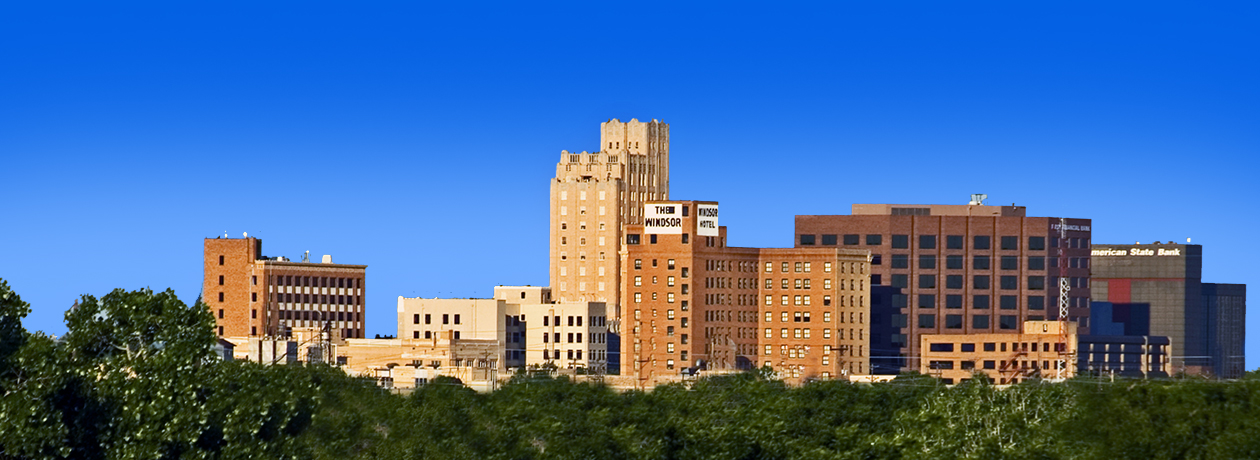
- Downtown Abilene

- Flag
- Nicknames: "The Key City"; "The Friendly Frontier"
- Interactive map of Abilene
- Location within Texas Location within the United States Location within North America
- Coordinates: 32°27′N 99°45′W
- Country: United States
- State: Texas
- Counties: Taylor, Jones
- Settled: 1881
- Incorporated (town): 1881
- County seat: 1883
- Named for: Abilene, Kansas
- County seat: Taylor County

Government
  - Type: Mayor–council–manager
  - Mayor: Weldon Hurt

Area
  - City: 112.09 sq mi (290.32 km^{2})
  - Land: 106.67 sq mi (276.27 km^{2})
  - Water: 5.42 sq mi (14.05 km^{2})
- Elevation: 1,729 ft (527 m)

Population (2020)
  - City: 125,182
  - Estimate (2025): 131,588 ▲
  - Density: 1,233/sq mi (476/km^{2})
  - Metro: 176,579
  - Demonym: Abilenian
- Time zone: UTC−6 (CST)
  - Summer (DST): UTC−5 (CDT)
- ZIP codes: 79601-08 79697-99
- Area code: 325
- FIPS code: 48-01000
- GNIS feature ID: 2409657
- Website: abilenetx.gov

Abilene (/ˈæbɪliːn/ AB-i-leen) is a city in Taylor and Jones counties, Texas, United States. Its population was 125,182 at the 2020 census. It is the principal city of the Abilene metropolitan statistical area, which had a population of 176,579 as of 2020. Abilene is home to three Christian universities: Abilene Christian University, McMurry University, and Hardin–Simmons University. It is the county seat of Taylor County. Dyess Air Force Base is located on the west side of the city.

Abilene is located on Interstate 20, which forms a rounded bypass loop along the northern side of the city, between exits 279 on its western edge and 292 on the east. The city is located 150 miles (240 km) west of Fort Worth. Multiple freeways form a loop surrounding the city's core: I-20 on the north, US 83/84/277 on the west, and Loop 322 to the east. The former Texas and Pacific Railway, now part of the Union Pacific mainline, divides the city into well-established north and south zones. The historic downtown area is on the north side of the railroad, while the growing south of downtown Abilene "SODA" district is located on the south side of the tracks.

== History ==
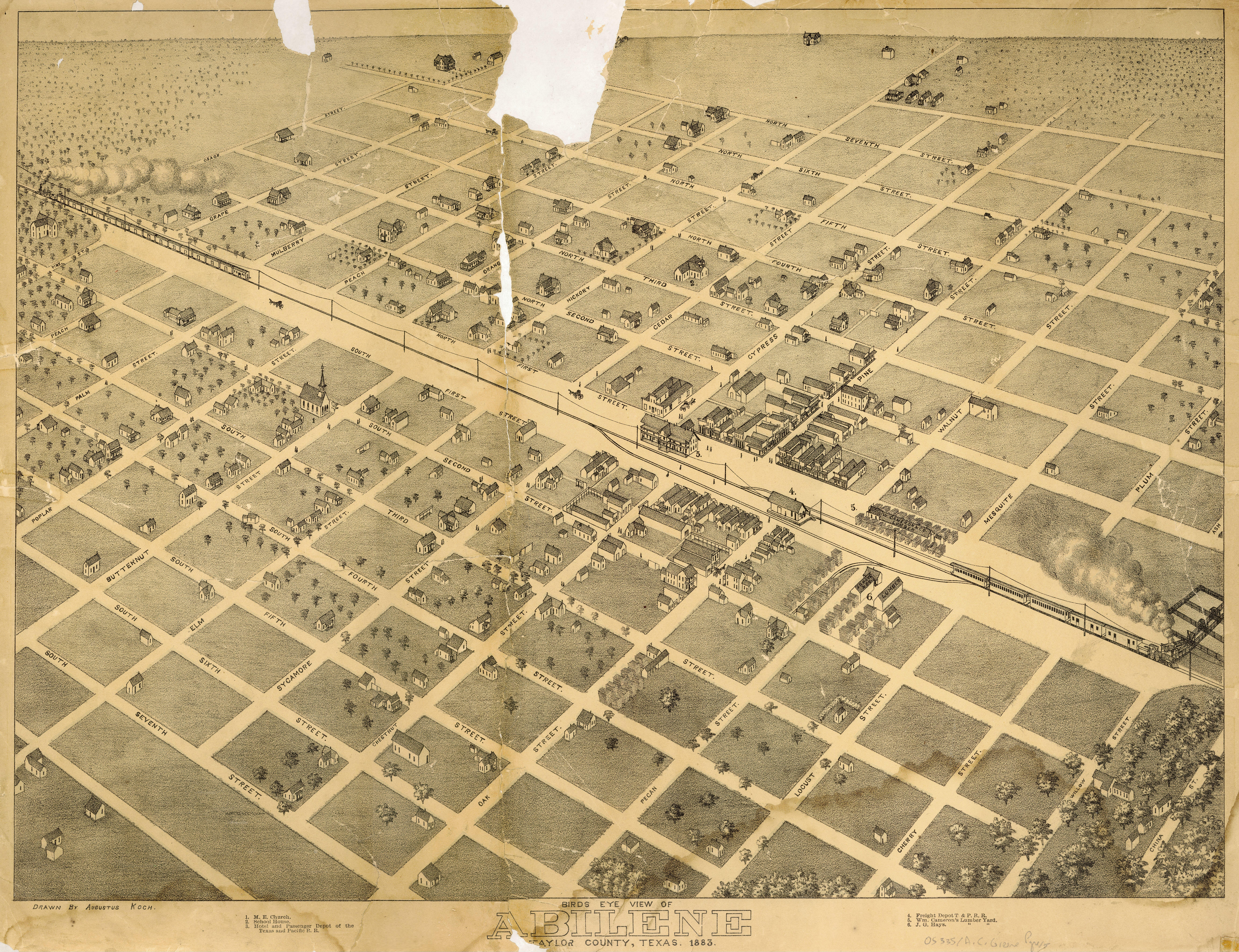
An 1883 map of Abilene

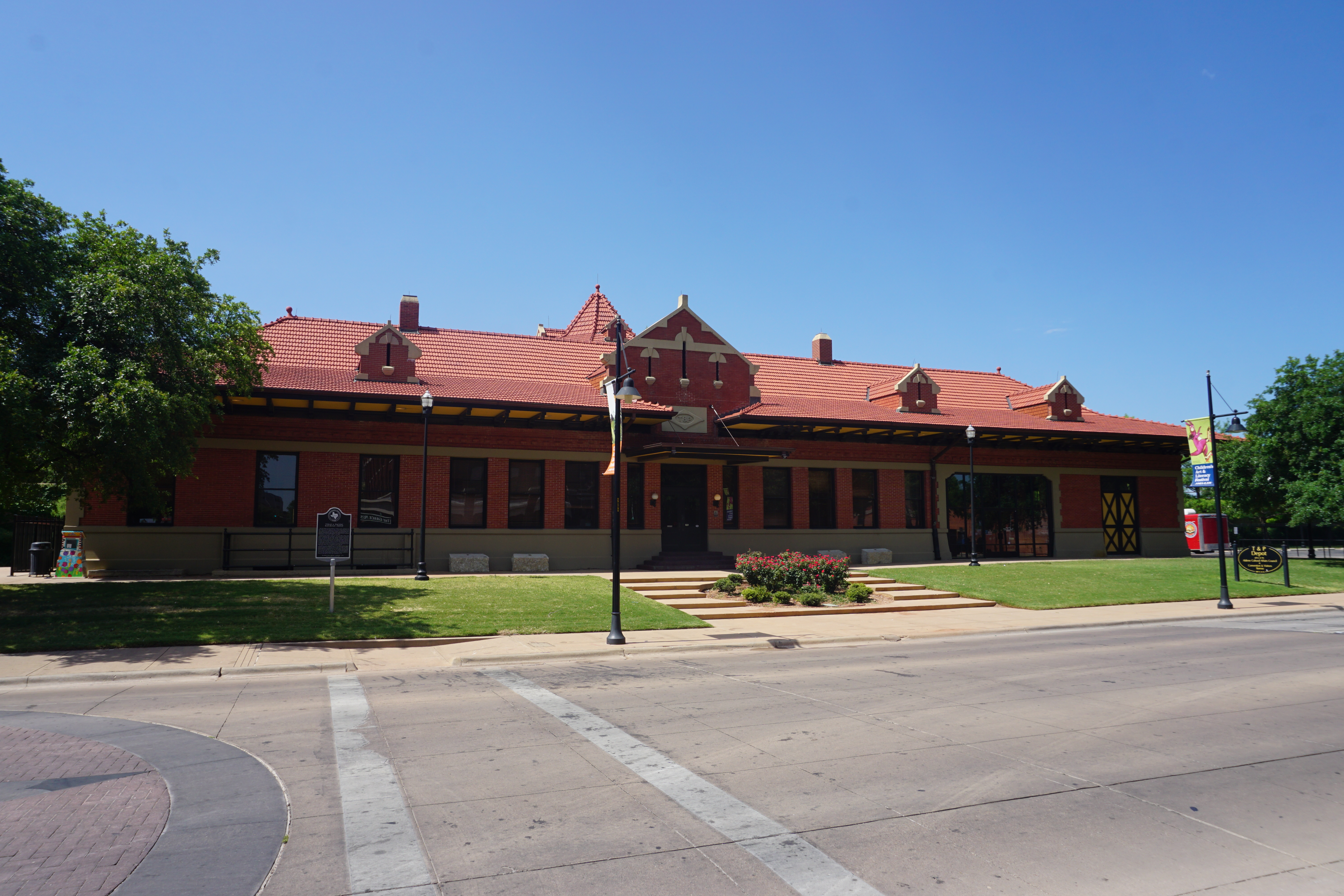
The restored Texas & Pacific Railway depot in Abilene serves as the tourist information center.

Established by cattlemen as a stock shipping point on the Texas and Pacific Railway in 1881, the city was named after Abilene, Kansas, the original endpoint for the Chisholm Trail. The T&P had bypassed the town of Buffalo Gap, the county seat at the time. Eventually, a landowner north of Buffalo Gap, Clabe Merchant, known as the father of Abilene, chose the name for the new town. According to a Dallas newspaper, about 800 people had already begun camping at the townsite before the lots were sold. The town was laid out by Colonel J. Stoddard Johnson, and the auction of lots began early on March 15, 1881. By the end of the first day, 139 lots were sold for a total of $23,810, and another 178 lots were sold the next day for $27,550.

Abilene was incorporated soon after its founding in 1881, and residents began to set their sights on bringing the county seat to Abilene. In a three-to-one vote, they won the county election to do so. In 1888, the Progressive Committee was formed to attract businesses to the area, and in 1890 renamed itself as the Board of Trade. By 1900, 3,411 people lived in Abilene. In that decade, the Board of Trade changed its name to the 25,000 Club, in the hope of reaching a population of 25,000 by the next census. By 1910, though, the population had increased only to 9,204. Another group was formed, the Young Men's Booster Club, which became the Abilene Chamber of Commerce in 1914.

In 1891, the cornerstone was laid for Simmons College, the first of three universities in Abilene. It later developed as Hardin–Simmons University. Childers Classical Institute was founded in 1906, and developed as Abilene Christian University, the largest of the three. In 1923, McMurry College was founded; it later expanded its offerings as McMurry University.

In the late 20th century, Abilene succeeded in gaining branches of Texas State Technical College and Cisco College. Headquarters of the latter institution are located in the city.

In 1940, Abilene raised the money to purchase land to attract establishment of a U.S. Army base southwest of town. It was named Camp Barkeley. When fully operational, it was twice the size of Abilene, with 60,000 men. When the base closed after World War II, many worried that Abilene could become a ghost town, but as the national economy boomed, many veterans returned to start businesses in Abilene.

In the early 1950s, to advocate for an Air Force base, residents raised US$893,261 (equivalent to about $11,079,872 in 2025) to purchase 3,400 acres (14 km^{2}) of land. The southern block of congressmen gained approval for such a base here. For decades, Dyess Air Force Base has been the city's largest employer, with 6076 employees in 2007.

From 1950 to 1960, Abilene's population nearly doubled, from 45,570 to 90,638. In 1960, a second high school (Cooper High School) was added to the city's school system.

In 1966, the Abilene Zoo was established near Abilene Regional Airport. The following year, one of the most important bond elections in the city's history passed for the funding of the construction of the Abilene Civic Center and the Taylor County Coliseum, as well as major improvements to Abilene Regional Airport. In 1969, the Woodson elementary and high school for black students closed as the city integrated its school system, more than 10 years after the US Supreme Court's ruling in Brown v. Board of Education (1954) that segregation of public schools was unconstitutional.

In 1982, Abilene became the first city in Texas to create a downtown reinvestment zone. Texas State Technical College opened an Abilene branch three years later. The 2,250-bed French Robertson Prison Unit was built in 1989. A half-cent sales tax earmarked for economic development was created after the decline in the petroleum business in the 1980s. A branch of Cisco College was located in the city in 1990.

Several major projects of restoration and new construction: The Grace Museum and Paramount Theatre, and development of Artwalk in 1992, sparked a decade of downtown revitalization. In 2004, Frontier Texas!, a multimedia museum highlighting the history of the area from 1780 to 1880, was constructed. That year, an $8 million, 38-acre (150,000 m^{2}) Cisco Junior College campus was built at Loop 322 and Industrial Boulevard. Simultaneously, subdivisions and businesses started locating along the freeway, on the same side as the CJC campus. This area attracted Abilene growth on the loop.

Abilene has become the commercial, retail, medical, and transportation hub of a 19-county area more commonly known as "The Big Country", but also known as the "Texas Midwest". It is part of the Central Great Plains ecoregion. By the end of 2005, commercial and residential development had reached record levels in and around the city.

=== Timeline ===
Timeline of Abilene, Texas
- 1881
  - Settlement established.
  - Texas & Pacific Railroad begins operating.
  - Abilene Reporter newspaper begins publication.
- 1883
  - Town of Abilene incorporated.
  - D. B. Corley becomes mayor.
  - Abilene becomes seat of Taylor County.
- 1890 – Population: 3,194.
- 1891 – Simmons College founded.
- 1898 – "Federation" subscription library organized.
- 1903 – Saloons banned in Abilene.
- 1906 – Childers Classical Institute established.
- 1910 – Population: 9,204.
- 1919 – Abilene Zoological Gardens established.
- 1923 – McMurry College established.
- 1924 – First Presbyterian Church built.
- 1925 – Majestic Theater, a major movie theater, opened.
- 1930
  - Paramount Theatre in business.
  - Population: 23,175.
- 1936 – KRBC radio begins broadcasting.
- 1937
  - Abilene Reporter-News in publication.
  - Regional "West Texas Chamber of Commerce" relocated to Abilene.
- 1942 – Temple Mizpah (synagogue) built.
- 1946 – Abilene Blue Sox baseball team formed.
- 1947 – Office of city manager established.
- 1949 – Park Drive-In cinema in business.
- 1950 – Abilene Philharmonic Orchestra active.
- 1953 – KRBC-TV (television) begins broadcasting.
- 1956
  - U.S. military Abilene Air Force Base begins operating.
  - KPAR-TV (television) begins broadcasting.
- 1960 – Population: 90,368.
- 1977 – Abilene Preservation League organized.
- 1978 – Alcohol prohibition ends in Abilene.
- 1979 – Charles Stenholm was elected as the Democratic U.S. representative for Texas's 17th congressional district. He was re-elected for 13 terms.
- 2000 – City website online (approximate date).
- 2001 – World War II-related "12th Armored Division Memorial Museum" opens.
- 2005 – Republican Randy Neugebauer was elected as U.S. representative for Texas's newly redrawn 19th congressional district, including Abilene.
- 2010 – Population: 117,063.
- 2017 – Jodey Arrington becomes U.S. representative for Texas's 19th congressional district.
- 2019 – revamping the downtown area of North Abilene. As of October 2019 a couple of buildings were torn down and Hilton developed a new Double Tree hotel.
- 2025 – Abilene suffered a ransomware attack by the Qilin ransomware group, encrypting and deleting lots of content.
- 2026 – the Stargate AI infrastructure project in Abilene, Texas, has become one of the city's largest employers, with over 6,400 workers at the local campus. The facility currently operates at a 1.2 GW capacity, utilizing NVIDIA Blackwell-series hardware for large-scale AI training workloads.

== Geography ==
Abilene is located in northeastern Taylor County. The city limits extend north into Jones County. Interstate 20 leads east 149 miles (240 km) to Fort Worth and west 148 miles (238 km) to Midland. Three U.S. highways pass through the city. US 83 runs west of the city center, leading north 24 miles (39 km) to Anson and south 55 miles (89 km) to Ballinger. US 84 runs with US 83 through the southwestern part of the city but leads southeast 52 miles (84 km) to Coleman and west with I-20 40 miles (64 km) to Sweetwater. US 277 follows US 83 around the northwestern side of the city and north to Anson, but heads southwest from Abilene 89 miles (143 km) to San Angelo.

According to the United States Census Bureau, Abilene has a total area of 112.2 sq mi (290.6 km^{2}), of which 106.8 sq mi (276.6 km^{2}) are land and 5.4 sq mi (14.0 km^{2}) are covered by water (4.82%). The water area is mainly from three reservoirs in the city: Lytle Lake, southeast of downtown on the western edge of Abilene Regional Airport, Kirby Lake on the southeastern corner of the US 83/84 and Loop 322 interchange, and Lake Fort Phantom Hill in Jones County in northern Abilene. Clear Creek runs through the city just east of downtown, flowing north to Elm Creek and ultimately part of the Brazos River watershed.

The fastest-growing sections of the city are in the southwest, along Southwest Drive, the Winters Freeway, and the Buffalo Gap Road corridor; the southeast, along Loop 322, Oldham Lane, Industrial Drive, and Maple Street; and in the northeast near the intersection of SH 351 and I-20. Many developments have begun in these three areas within the last few years with a citywide focus on the reinvigoration of downtown Abilene.

=== Climate ===
According to the Köppen climate classification, Abilene lies at the edge of a humid subtropical climate, with areas to the west being semiarid.

Climate data for Abilene, Texas (Abilene Regional Airport), 1991−2020 normals, extremes 1885–present
Month	Jan	Feb	Mar	Apr	May	Jun	Jul	Aug	Sep	Oct	Nov	Dec	Year
Record high °F (°C)	90 (32)	94 (34)	98 (37)	104 (40)	109 (43)	110 (43)	110 (43)	113 (45)	108 (42)	103 (39)	93 (34)	90 (32)	113 (45)
Mean maximum °F (°C)	78.6 (25.9)	82.9 (28.3)	88.6 (31.4)	93.2 (34.0)	98.6 (37.0)	100.1 (37.8)	102.6 (39.2)	102.4 (39.1)	97.5 (36.4)	92.4 (33.6)	83.2 (28.4)	77.9 (25.5)	104.6 (40.3)
Mean daily maximum °F (°C)	58.8 (14.9)	62.8 (17.1)	70.9 (21.6)	79.2 (26.2)	86.3 (30.2)	92.8 (33.8)	96.4 (35.8)	96.0 (35.6)	88.7 (31.5)	79.3 (26.3)	67.8 (19.9)	59.4 (15.2)	78.2 (25.7)
Daily mean °F (°C)	46.3 (7.9)	50.1 (10.1)	58.1 (14.5)	66.0 (18.9)	74.1 (23.4)	81.1 (27.3)	84.7 (29.3)	84.2 (29.0)	76.8 (24.9)	67.0 (19.4)	55.5 (13.1)	47.3 (8.5)	65.9 (18.9)
Mean daily minimum °F (°C)	33.7 (0.9)	37.4 (3.0)	45.3 (7.4)	52.8 (11.6)	61.9 (16.6)	69.5 (20.8)	73.1 (22.8)	72.4 (22.4)	65.0 (18.3)	54.7 (12.6)	43.3 (6.3)	35.2 (1.8)	53.7 (12.1)
Mean minimum °F (°C)	17.8 (−7.9)	20.1 (−6.6)	25.3 (−3.7)	34.7 (1.5)	45.2 (7.3)	59.6 (15.3)	65.8 (18.8)	63.0 (17.2)	49.8 (9.9)	35.3 (1.8)	24.8 (−4.0)	18.8 (−7.3)	14.0 (−10.0)
Record low °F (°C)	−9 (−23)	−7 (−22)	9 (−13)	25 (−4)	33 (1)	44 (7)	54 (12)	48 (9)	38 (3)	20 (−7)	13 (−11)	−7 (−22)	−9 (−23)
Average precipitation inches (mm)	1.10 (28)	1.29 (33)	1.73 (44)	1.86 (47)	3.21 (82)	3.44 (87)	1.92 (49)	2.53 (64)	2.67 (68)	2.83 (72)	1.40 (36)	1.26 (32)	25.24 (641)
Average snowfall inches (cm)	0.7 (1.8)	1.0 (2.5)	0.1 (0.25)	0.3 (0.76)	0.0 (0.0)	0.0 (0.0)	0.0 (0.0)	0.0 (0.0)	0.0 (0.0)	0.0 (0.0)	0.7 (1.8)	0.9 (2.3)	3.7 (9.4)
Average precipitation days (≥ 0.01 in)	4.6	5.1	5.8	4.7	8.0	6.9	4.7	6.0	5.9	6.2	4.5	4.8	67.2
Average snowy days (≥ 0.1 in)	0.5	0.8	0.2	0.0	0.0	0.0	0.0	0.0	0.0	0.1	0.3	0.5	2.4
Mean monthly sunshine hours	204.6	203.4	263.5	282.0	306.9	330.0	347.2	316.2	258.0	248.0	198.0	192.2	3,150
Source 1: NOAA
Source 2: National Weather Service Hong Kong Observatory (sun only, 1961–1990)

=== Notable architecture ===
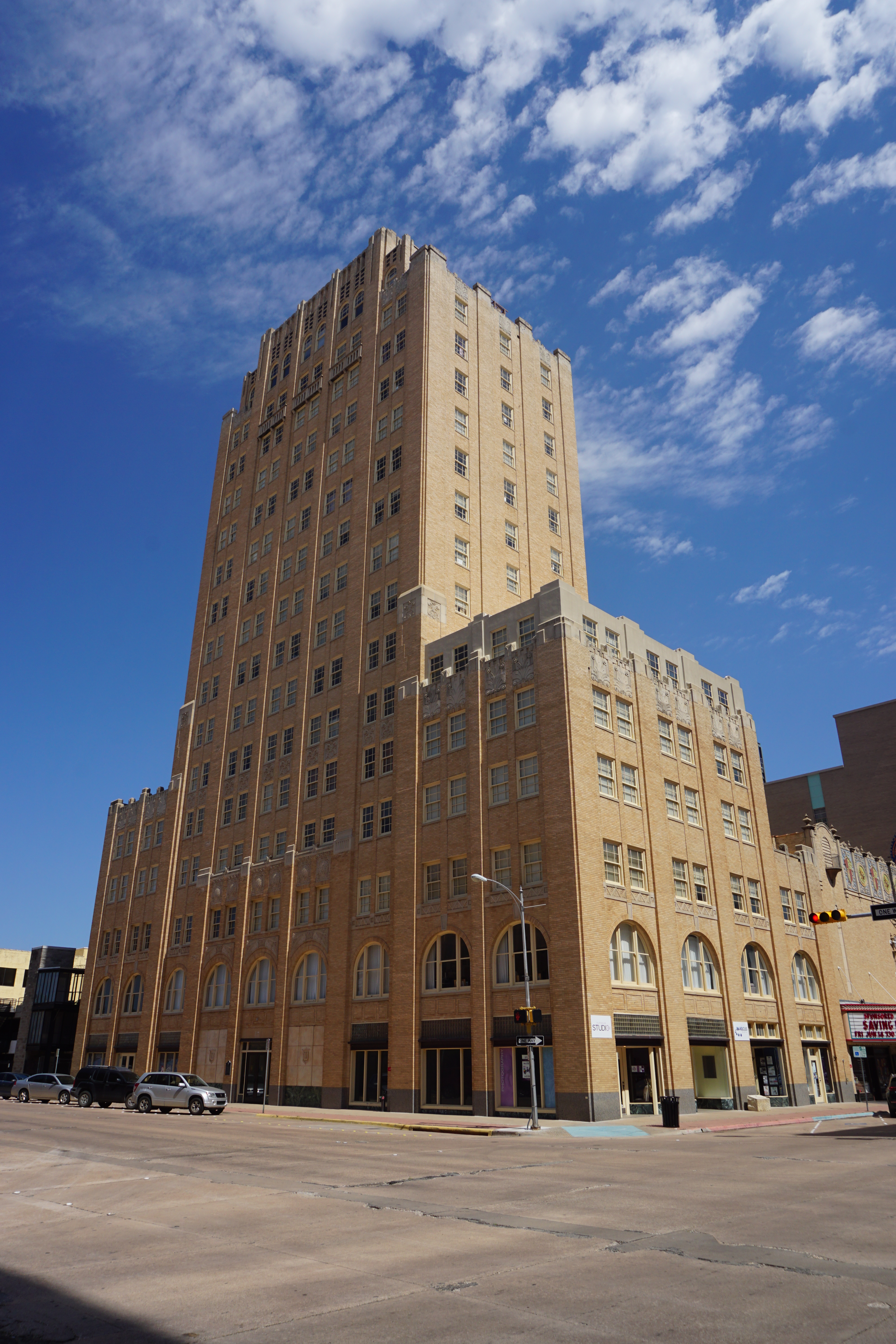
Hotel Wooten

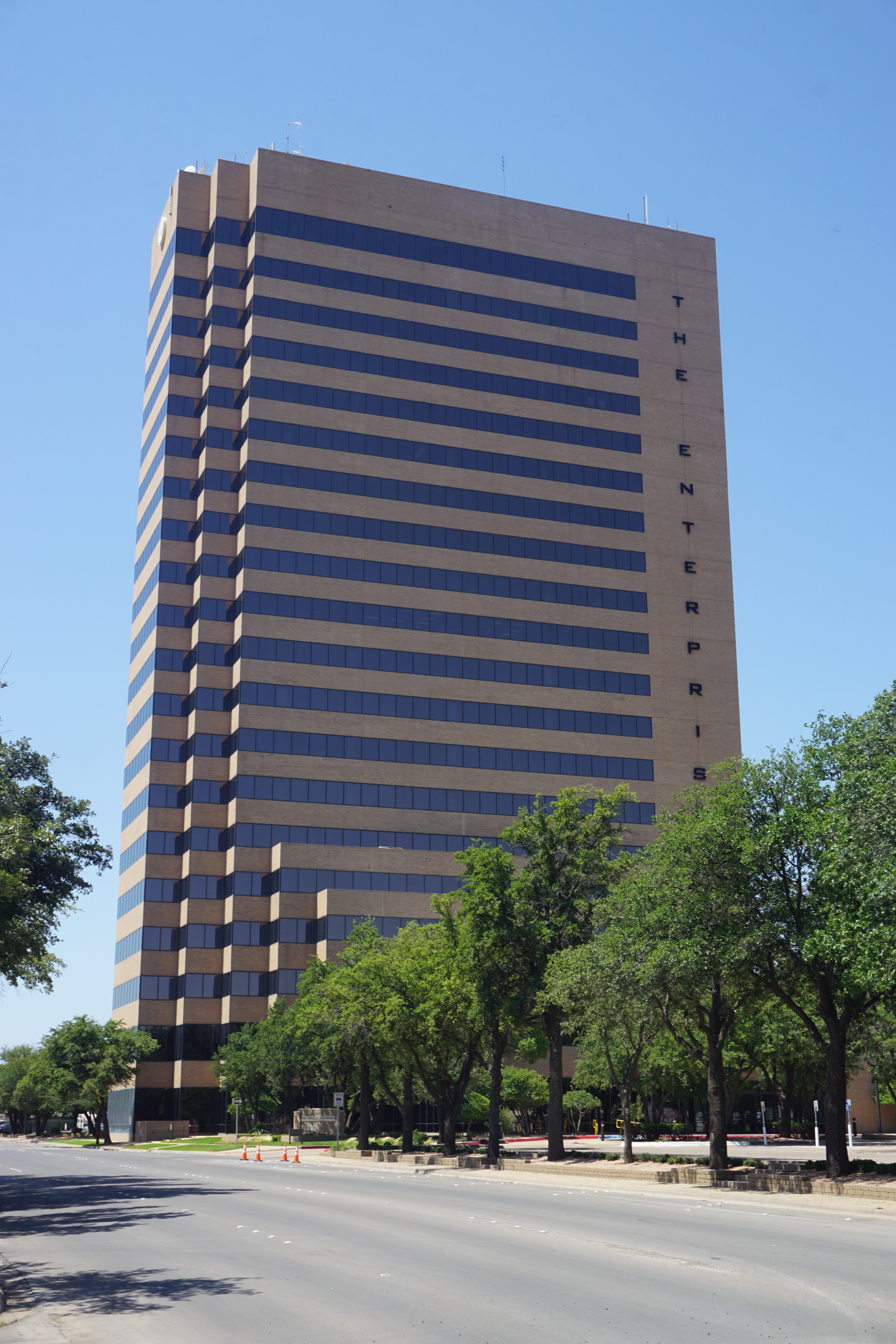
Enterprise Tower

Notable and historical buildings in Abilene include:

- Hotel Wooten (1930) at 302 Cypress Street downtown, built by grocery entrepreneur H. O. Wooten, at 16 stories tall, is designed after the Drake Hotel in Chicago. It was restored in 2004 as a high-end apartment building.
- First Baptist Church (1954) at 1442 North Second Street has a spire 140 feet (43 m) from the ground. Pastor Jesse Northcutt oversaw the planning of this building of 325 tons of steel.
- The Church of the Heavenly Rest, Episcopal, at 602 Meander Street, reflects surprising Gothic architecture on the West Texas Plains. Its plaque reads: "No man entering a house ignores him who dwells in it. This is the house of God and He is here."
- The 20-story Enterprise Tower at 500 Chestnut Street, the highest structure in Abilene, rises to 283 feet (86 m) above the Plains. It is the tallest building in west central Texas and one of the five highest in the western two-thirds of the state.
- The Taylor County Courthouse at 300 Oak Street, with its international architectural style of concrete and pink granite, resembles few other courthouses.
- Paramount Theatre at 352 Cypress Street (opened in 1930 and restored in 1986) had an original 90-foot (27 m) marquee, with 1,400 lights.
- Lincoln Junior High School, 1699 South First Street. In 2012, the Abilene Independent School District deeded the property to the City of Abilene. This property was placed on the National Register of Historic Places on August 28, 2012. Built in 1923, the architecture is Gothic Revival and includes two large gargoyles at the entrance and has Gothic and art deco motifs. It opened as Abilene High School in 1924, became Lincoln Junior High in 1955, and Lincoln Middle School in 1985. The campus closed in 2007. As of 2019, the Abilene Heritage Square was renovating the school into "a multipurpose center for learning, making, discovery, building community and innovating and encouraging our city's future businesses." The Abilene Public Library will also use the restored building as the new main branch.

== Demographics ==
Historical population
Census	Pop.	Note	%±
1890	3,194		—
1900	3,411		6.8%
1910	9,204		169.8%
1920	10,274		11.6%
1930	23,175		125.6%
1940	26,612		14.8%
1950	45,570		71.2%
1960	90,368		98.3%
1970	89,653		−0.8%
1980	98,315		9.7%
1990	106,707		8.5%
2000	115,930		8.6%
2010	117,063		1.0%
2020	125,182		6.9%
2025 (est.)	131,588		5.1%
U.S. Census Bureau

=== Racial and ethnic composition ===
Abilene city, Texas – Racial and ethnic composition Note: the US Census treats Hispanic/Latino as an ethnic category. This table excludes Latinos from the racial categories and assigns them to a separate category. Hispanics/Latinos may be of any race.
Race / Ethnicity (NH = Non-Hispanic)	Pop 2000	Pop 2010	Pop 2020	% 2000	% 2010	% 2020
White alone (NH)	79,712	73,016	70,391	68.76%	62.37%	56.23%
Black or African American alone (NH)	9,947	10,638	12,242	8.58%	9.09%	9.78%
Native American or Alaska Native alone (NH)	428	448	496	0.37%	0.38%	0.40%
Asian alone (NH)	1,492	1,865	2,678	1.29%	1.59%	2.14%
Pacific Islander alone (NH)	63	94	141	0.05%	0.08%	0.11%
Some Other Race alone (NH)	95	137	388	0.08%	0.12%	0.31%
Mixed race or Multiracial (NH)	1,645	2,199	5,212	1.42%	1.88%	4.16%
Hispanic or Latino (any race)	22,548	28,666	33,634	19.45%	24.49%	26.87%
Total	115,930	117,063	125,182	100.00%	100.00%	100.00%

=== 2020 census ===
As of the 2020 census, Abilene had a population of 125,182, 46,134 households, and 29,111 families. The population density was 1,173.6 per square mile (453.1/km^{2}). There were 51,508 housing units at an average density of 482.9 units per square mile (186.4 units/km^{2}).

92.6% of residents lived in urban areas, while 7.4% lived in rural areas.

Of the 46,134 households in Abilene, 31.1% had children under the age of 18 living in them; 43.6% were married-couple households; 20.4% had a male householder with no spouse or partner present; 29.5% had a female householder with no spouse or partner present; 29.7% of households were made up of individuals and 10.7% had someone living alone who was 65 years of age or older.

There were 51,508 housing units, of which 10.4% were vacant. Among occupied housing units, 54.8% were owner-occupied and 45.2% were renter-occupied. The homeowner vacancy rate was 2.3% and the rental vacancy rate was 11.2%.

The racial makeup was 64.95% (81,300) white or European American (56.23% non-Hispanic white), 10.39% (13,012) black or African-American, 0.89% (1,114) Native American or Alaska Native, 2.22% (2,785) Asian, 0.14% (170) Pacific Islander or Native Hawaiian, 9.26% (11,590) from other races, and 12.15% (15,211) from two or more races. Hispanic or Latino of any race accounted for 26.87% (33,634) of the population.

23.0% of the population was under the age of 18, 13.4% were from 18 to 24, 28.0% were from 25 to 44, 21.1% were from 45 to 64, and 14.6% were 65 years of age or older. The median age was 33.7 years. For every 100 females there were 102.4 males, and for every 100 females age 18 and over there were 101.7 males age 18 and over.

Racial composition as of the 2020 census
Race	Percent
White	65.0%
Black or African American	10.4%
American Indian and Alaska Native	0.9%
Asian	2.2%
Native Hawaiian and Other Pacific Islander	0.1%
Some other race	9.3%
Two or more races	12.2%
Hispanic or Latino (of any race)	26.9%

=== American Community Survey ===
The 2016–2020 5-year American Community Survey estimates show that the median household income was $52,518 (with a margin of error of +/- $2,091) and the median family income was $67,079 (+/- $3,258). Males had a median income of $32,038 (+/- $1,216) versus $22,765 (+/- $1,577) for females, and the median income for those 16 years and older was $27,110 (+/- $739). Approximately 9.9% of families and 15.2% of the population were below the poverty line, including 18.8% of those under the age of 18 and 9.5% of those ages 65 or over.

The average household size was 2.5 and the average family size was 3.1. The percent of residents with a bachelor's degree or higher was estimated to be 16.5% of the population.

At the 2020 American Community Survey, the median household income in the city was $52,518 and the mean household income was $70,807.

=== 2010 census ===
As of the 2010 census, Abilene had a population of 117,063.

The racial and ethnic makeup in 2010 was 62.4% non-Hispanic White, 9.6% Black or African American, 0.7% Native American, 1.7% Asian, 0.1% Pacific Islander, 0.1% non-Hispanic reporting some other race, 3.3% of two or more races, and 24.5% Hispanic or Latino.

=== 2000 census ===
As of the 2000 census, 115,930 people, 41,570 households, and 28,101 families resided in the city. The population density was 1,102.7 inhabitants per square mile (425.8/km^{2}). The 45,618 housing units averaged 433.9 units per square mile (167.5 units/km^{2}).

In 2000, the racial makeup of the city was 78.07% white, 8.81% African American, 0.55% Native American, 1.33% Asian, 0.07% Pacific Islander, 8.73% from other races, and 2.44% from two or more races. Hispanics or Latinos of any race were 19.45% of the population.

At the 2000 census, the median income for a household in the city was $33,007, and for a family was $40,028. Males had a median income of $28,078 versus $20,918 for females. The per capita income for the city was $16,577. About 10.9% of families and 15.4% of the population were below the poverty line, including 18.6% of those under age 18 and 9.2% of those age 65 or over.

== Economy ==
The economy in Abilene was originally based on the livestock and agricultural sectors, but is now based strongly on government, education, healthcare, and manufacturing. The petroleum industry is prevalent in the surrounding area, also. The city has established incentives to bring new businesses to the area, including job training grants, relocation grants, and more.

=== Top employers ===
According to the city's 2024 Annual Comprehensive Financial Report, Abilene's top employers are:

Rank	Employer	Employees
1	Dyess Air Force Base	8,864
2	Hendrick Health System	2,896
3	Abilene Independent School District	2,500
4	Abilene State Supported Living Center	1,475
5	City of Abilene	1,299
6	Texas Department of Criminal Justice	1,187
7	Abilene Christian University	1,164
8	Blue Cross Blue Shield of Texas	760
9	Wylie Independent School District	700
10	Taylor County	560

== Government and infrastructure ==
The Texas Department of Criminal Justice (TDCJ) operates the Abilene District Parole Office in the city. The Robertson Unit prison and the Middleton Unit transfer unit are in Abilene and in Jones County.

The United States Postal Service operates the Abilene Post Office and the Abilene Southern Hills Post Office.

On June 17, 2017, Abilene elected its first African-American mayor, Anthony Williams.

List of mayors of Abilene, Texas
- D. B. Corley, 1883–1885
- G. A. Kirkland, 1885–1886
- D. W. Wristen, 1886–1891
- H. A. Porter, 1891–1893
- D. W. Wristen, 1893–1897
- A. M. Robertson, 1897–1899
- John Bowyers, 1899–1901
- F. C. Digby Roberts, 1901–1904
- R. W. Ellis, 1904–1905
- Morgan Weaver, 1905–1907
- E. N. Kirby, 1906–1919
- Dallas Scarborough, 1919–1923
- Charles E. Coombes, 1923–1927
- Thomas E. Hayden, 1927–1931
- Lee R. York, 1931–1933
- C. L. Johnson, 1933–1937
- Will Hair, 1937–1947
- B. R. Blankenship, 1947–1949
- Hudson Smart, 1949–1951
- Ernest Grissom, 1951–1953
- C. E. Gatlin, 1953–1957
- Jess F. (T-Bone) Winters, 1957–1959
- George L Minter, 1959–1961
- C. R. Kinard, 1961–1963
- W. L. Byrd, 1963–1966
- Ralph N. Hooks, 1966–1969
- J. C. Hunter Jr., 1969–1975
- Fred Lee Hughes, 1975–1978
- Oliver Howard, 1978–1981
- Elbert E. Hall, 1981–1984
- David Stubbeman, 1984–1987
- Dale E. Ferguson, 1987–1990
- Gary D. McCaleb, 1990–1999
- Grady Barr, 1999–2004
- Norm Archibald, 2004–2017
- Anthony Williams, 2017–2023
- Weldon Hurt, 2023–present

== Education ==
=== Primary education ===
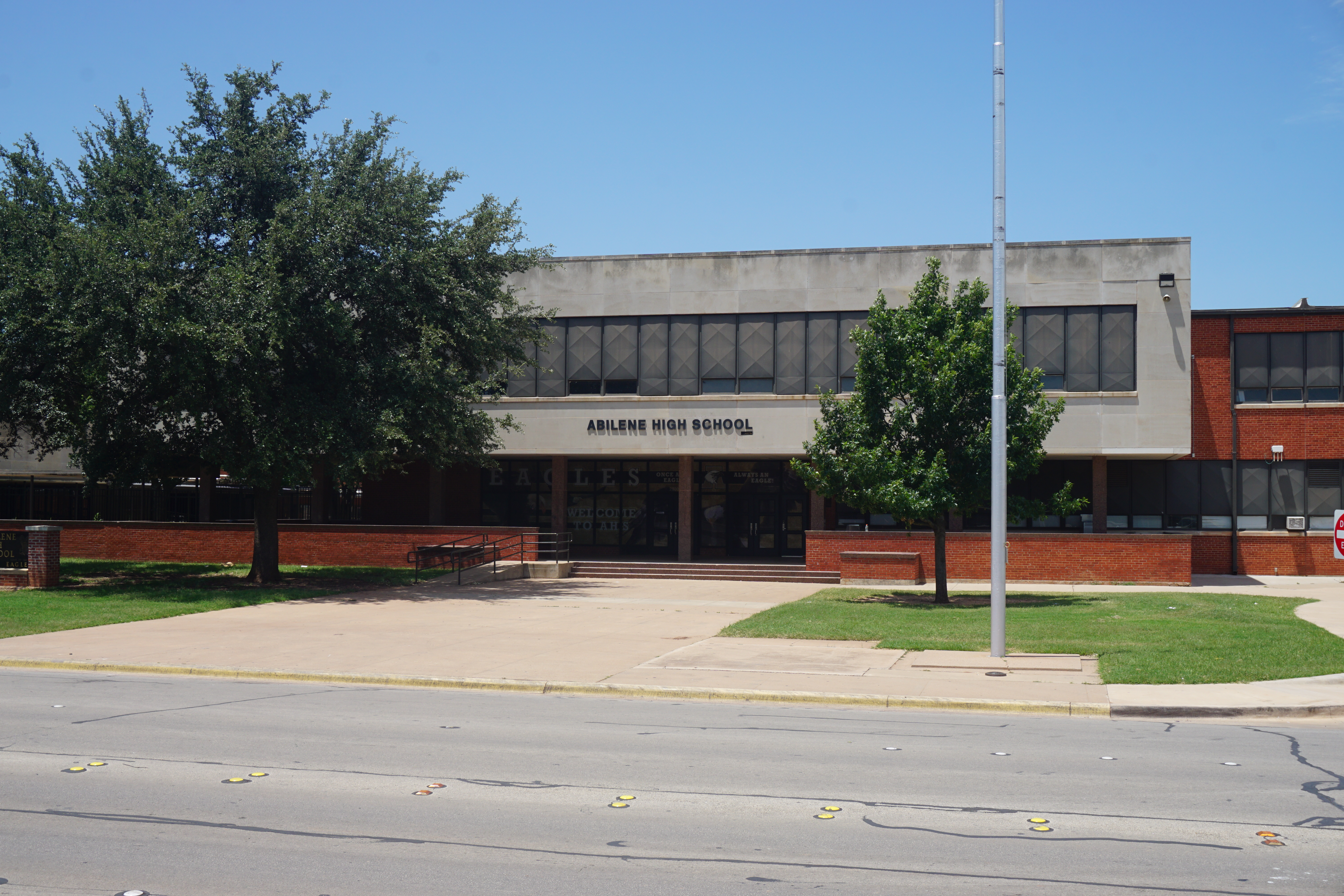
Abilene High School

As of 2020, within Taylor County, most of Abilene is in the Abilene Independent School District (AISD), while portions extend into Wylie Independent School District (WISD), Eula Independent School District and Merkel Independent School District. Within Jones County, most of Abilene is in AISD, while portions extend into Clyde Consolidated Independent School District and Hawley Independent School District.

High schools include Abilene High School and Cooper High School of AISD, and Wylie High School of WISD.

=== Colleges and universities ===
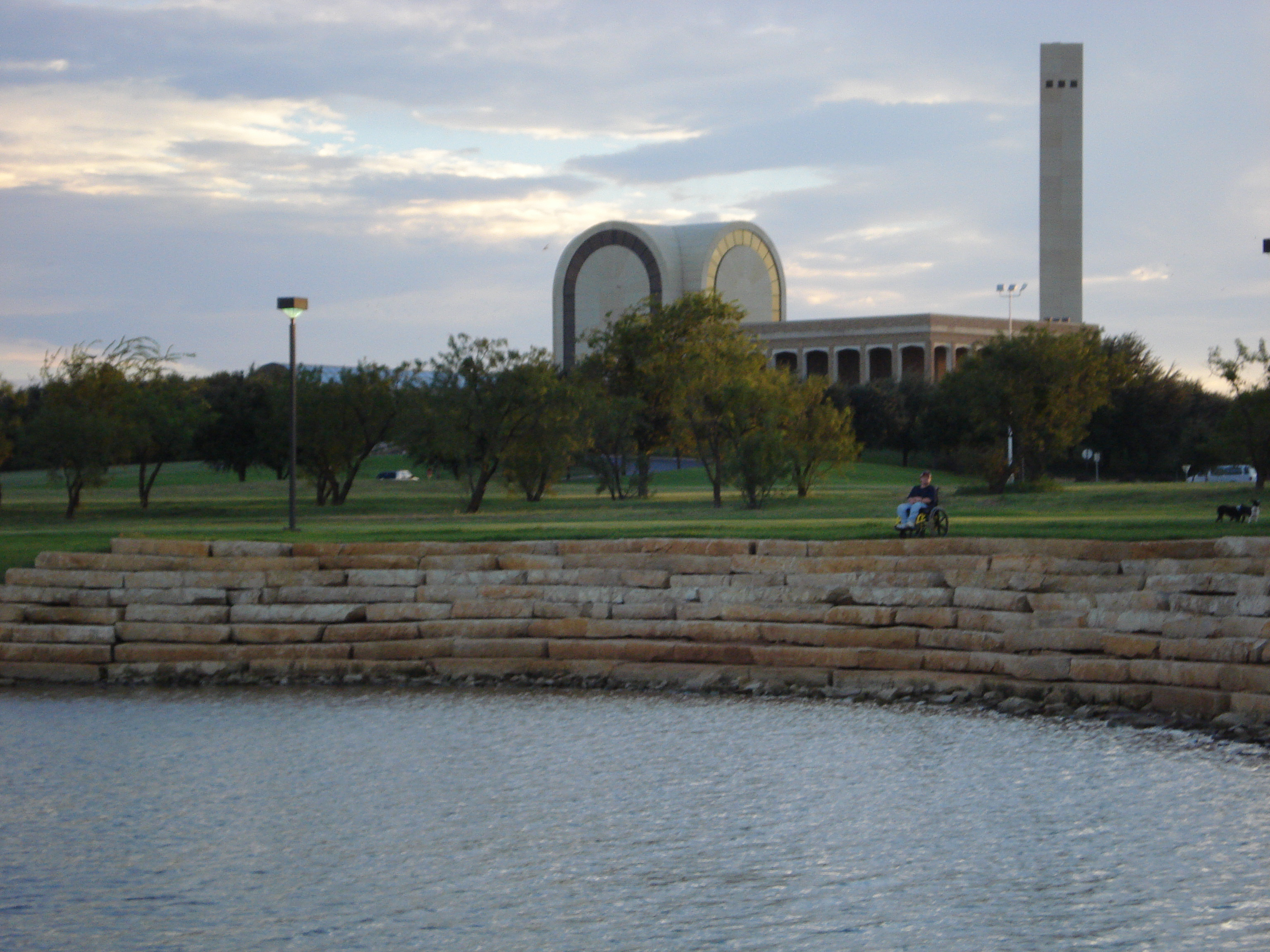
Abilene Christian University campus

Abilene is home to six colleges, three of which are religiously affiliated. Hardin–Simmons University is the oldest, founded in 1891. Abilene Christian University is the largest with 2012 undergraduate enrollment at 4,371.

Name	Affiliation	Founded	Enrollment
Abilene Christian University	Churches of Christ	1906	6,219
Cisco College		1972	3,256
Hardin–Simmons University	Baptist	1891	1,765
McMurry University	Methodist	1923	1,237
Texas State Technical College West Texas		1985	1,049
Texas Tech University Health Sciences Center Abilene Campus		2006	332

The Texas Legislature designated Taylor County as being in the Cisco Junior College District, while it designated Jones County as being in the Western Texas College District.

== Healthcare ==
Hendrick Medical Center includes two large hospital campuses on the north and south sides of Abilene, and is one of the city's largest employers. It is one of seven healthcare institutions affiliated with the Baptist General Convention of Texas.

The Presbyterian Medical Care Mission was founded in 1983 as a medical and dental clinic. Its services are focused to low-income individuals and families without insurance.

== Culture ==
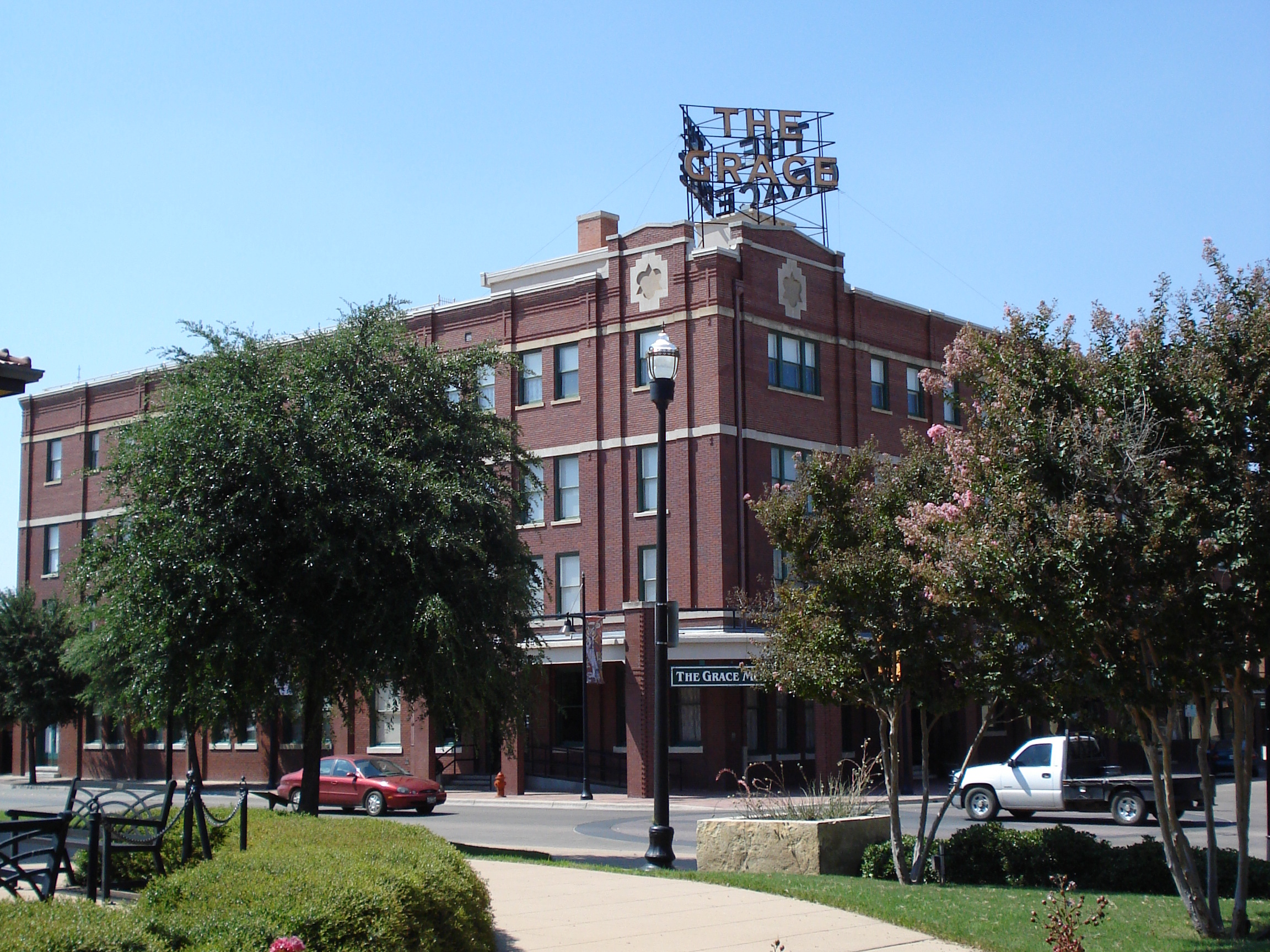
The Grace Museum

The cultural aspects of Abilene revolve around a mix of the local college and university campuses, the agriculture community of the surrounding area, and a growing nightlife scene in the downtown area. Abilene is also home to the restored Paramount Theatre, the Abilene Philharmonic Orchestra, the Grace Museum, the Center for Contemporary Arts, the National Center for Children's Illustrated Literature, The Abilene Zoo, Frontier Texas!, the 12th Armored Division Museum, the Taylor County Expo Center, the Abilene Convention Center, six libraries (three private, three public), 26 public parks, six television stations, a daily newspaper, and several radio stations, including one NPR station (89.5 KACU).

=== Storybook Capital of Texas ===
The popularity of the National Center for Children's Illustrated Literature, the annual Children's Art & Literacy Festival, and a large public collection of bronze storybook sculptures (23 storybook sculptures on permanent public display in the downtown area) led Texas State Rep. Susan King to author a bill to designate Abilene, Texas the Storybook Capital of Texas. House Concurrent Resolution 93 was authored by Texas State Rep. Susan King and sponsored by Texas State Sen. Troy Fraser. It was signed by Governor Greg Abbott on June 9th, 2015.

Rep. Susan King, dressed as a princess and surrounded by storybook characters, made the announcement that Abilene, Texas, had been designated the "Storybook Capital of Texas" at the 2015 Children's Art & Literacy Festival.

=== Storybook Capital of America ===
As the number of storybook sculptures continued to grow, spreading throughout the downtown Abilene area, in 2017 that number reached a new level. Abilene was officially home to the largest collection of bronze storybook sculptures in the nation. The Abilene Cultural Affairs Council, in partnership with the Abilene Convention & Visitors Bureau, led the charge to pursue obtaining the Storybook Capital of America trademark. In 2017, the Abilene Arts Alliance filed the necessary paperwork with the U.S. Patent & Trademark Office to trademark the phrase and logo of "The Storybook Capital of America". The trademark was registered by the U.S. Patent & Trademark Office in 2018.

Mayor Anthony Williams made the formal announcement at the Abilene Cultural Affairs Council's "Celebrate the Arts" luncheon in October 2018.

Cedar Street between North First and North Third streets is also listed as 'Santa Calls Lane'. Additionally, Cypress Street is also designated 'Storybook Way'. The new street signs also bear the new logo that was designed for the Storybook Capital of America.

=== Children's Art + Literacy Festival ===
The Children's Art + Literacy Festival, or CALF as it is known to locals, first started in 2012. It is presented each year by the Abilene Cultural Affairs Council. As an annual event, the family-friendly festival takes over downtown Abilene, from the National Center for Children's Illustrated Literature to the Paramount Theatre (Abilene, Texas) to the Grace Museum to the Abilene Convention Center and many more businesses which choose to participate in between. Visitors can stop in and listen to dramatic readings of the stories written and/or illustrated by that year's featured author/illustrator at various locations, collect buttons designed specifically for the event, do crafts, see costumed storybook characters, and attend a variety of family-friendly performances presented throughout downtown Abilene.

There's also the opportunity to see the latest addition(s) to one of the many sculpture gardens and locations around the area.

=== Storybook Sculptures ===
Below is a list of the various Storybook Sculptures that have been erected throughout downtown Abilene.

Year of Installation	Character/Name of Sculpture	Book	Author and/or Illustrator
1996	Childhood's Great Adventure	"Santa Calls"	William Joyce
2000	Dino Bob	"Dinosaur Bob and His Adventures with the Family Lazardo"	William Joyce
2012	Cat in the Hat	"The Cat in the Hat"	Dr. Theodor Seuss Geisel
2013	The Lorax	"The Lorax"	Dr. Theodor Seuss Geisel
2013	Yertle the Turtle	"Yertle the Turtle and Other Stories"	Dr. Theodor Seuss Geisel
2013	The Grinch	"How the Grinch Stole Christmas!"	Dr. Theodor Seuss Geisel
2013	Green Eggs and Ham	"Green Eggs and Ham"	Dr. Theodor Seuss Geisel
2013	Horton Hears a Who	"Horton Hears a Who!"	Dr. Theodor Seuss Geisel
2013	Seymour	"Can You See What I See?" series	Walter Wick
2014	Man in the Moon	"The Man in the Moon"	William Joyce
2014	E. Aster Bunnymund	"E. Aster Bunnymund and the Warrior Eggs at the Earth's Core!"	William Joyce
2014	Nicholas St. North	"Nicholas St. North and the Battle of the Nightmare King"	William Joyce
2014	Jack Frost	"Jack Frost" and "Jack Frost: The End Becomes the Beginning"	William Joyce
2014	Sanderson Mansnoozie	"The Sandman: The Story of Sanderson Mansnoozie" and "The Sandman and the War of Dreams"	William Joyce
2014	Toothiana	"Toothiana: Queen of the Tooth Fairy Armies"	William Joyce
2015	Duck on a Bike	"Duck on a Bike"	David Shannon
2015	No, David! and Fergus	"David Gets in Trouble"	David Shannon
2016	Good Night Dinosaur	"How Do Dinosaurs Say Good Night?"	Mark Teague (Illustrator) and Jane Yolen (Author)
2017	The Three Little Kittens	"Three Bedtime Stories"	Garth Williams (Illustrator)
2017	Stuart Little	"Stuart Little"	E. B. White (Author) and Garth Williams (Illustrator)
2017	The Three Little Pigs	"Three Bedtime Stories"	Garth Williams (Illustrator)
2017	Charlotte & Wilbur	"Charlotte's Web"	E. B. White (Author) and Garth Williams (Illustrator)
2017	The Three Bears	"Three Bedtime Stories"	Garth Williams (Illustrator)
2018	Marcel & Wilfred	"This Moose Belongs to Me"	Oliver Jeffers
2019	Mr. Tiger	"Mr. Tiger Goes Wild"	Peter Brown
2021	Otis and the Calf	"Otis"	Loren Long
2022	Winnie	"Finding Winnie: The True Story of the World's Most Famous Bear"	Lindsay Mattick (Author) and Sophie Blackall (Illustrator)
2023	Evan and His Friend	"The Rough Patch"	Brian Lies
2024	Itty-Bitty Kitty-Corn and Unicorn	"Itty-Bitty Kitty-Corn"	Shannon Hale (Author) and LeUyen Pham (Illustrator)
2025	Plum the Peacock	"Leave it to Plum"	Matt Phelan
2025	Turtle Walk	"Turtle Walk"	Matt Phelan
2026	Winnie the Pooh & Piglet	Winnie the Pooh book series	A. A. Milne (Author) and Ernest H. Shepard (Illustrator)
2026	Christopher Robin	Winnie the Pooh book series	A. A. Milne (Author) and Ernest H. Shepard (Illustrator)
2026	Rabbit	Winnie the Pooh book series	A. A. Milne (Author) and Ernest H. Shepard (Illustrator)
2026	Eeyore	Winnie the Pooh book series	A. A. Milne (Author) and Ernest H. Shepard (Illustrator)
2026	Kanga, Roo & Tigger	Winnie the Pooh book series	A. A. Milne (Author) and Ernest H. Shepard (Illustrator)
2026	Owl	Winnie the Pooh book series	A. A. Milne (Author) and Ernest H. Shepard (Illustrator)
2026	The Giving Tree	"The Giving Tree"	Shel Silverstein

== Media ==
=== Newspapers ===
The Abilene Reporter-News is the primary daily newspaper of the city of Abilene and the surrounding Big Country area.

=== Television ===
Channel	Call letters	Network
9	KRBC-TV	NBC
12	KTXS-TV	ABC; The CW Plus (DT2)
15	KXVA	Fox; MyNetworkTV (DT2)
17	KPCB-DT	God's Learning Channel
32	KTAB-TV	CBS; Telemundo (DT2)
40	KTES-LD	Roar

=== Radio ===
- 88.1 FM KGNZ (Christian contemporary)
- 89.5 FM KACU (Public Radio)
- 90.5 FM KAGT (Christian contemporary)
- 91.3 FM KAQD (Religious)
- 91.7 FM KQOS (Religious)
- 92.5 FM KMWX (Red Dirt Country)
- 93.3 FM KBGT (Tejano)
- 94.1 FM KVVO-LP (Inspirational Country)
- 95.1 FM KABW (Country)
- 96.1 FM KORQ (Farm, Country)
- 98.1 FM KTLT (Active Rock)
- 99.7 FM KBCY (Country)
- 100.7 FM KULL (Classic hits)
- 101.7 FM KABT (Americana and red dirt country)
- 102.7 FM KHXS (Classic Rock)
- 103.7 FM KCDD (Top 40)
- 105.1 FM KEAN (Country)
- 106.3 FM KTJK (variety hits)
- 106.9 FM KLGD (Country)
- 107.9 FM KEYJ (Active Rock)
- 1280 AM KSLI (Country)
- 1340 AM KWKC (News Talk)
- 1470 AM KYYW (News Talk)
- 1560 AM KZQQ (Sports talk)

== Transportation ==
=== Major highways ===
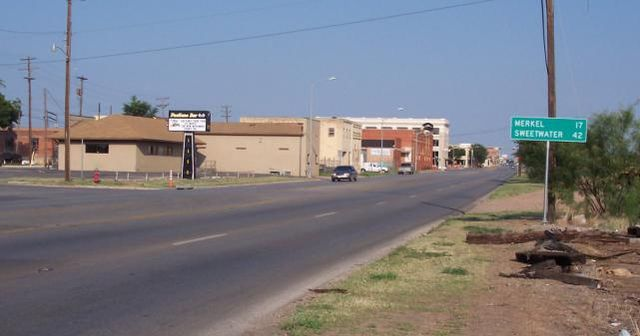
A section of Business Loop 20 (formerly US 80) in Abilene

- Interstate 20
- Business Loop 20
- US 80 (former)
- US 83
- US 84
- US 277
- SH 36
- Loop 322
- SH 351
- FM 89 (Buffalo Gap Road)
- FM 600
- FM 707 (Beltway South)
- UR 18
- UR 3438

=== Airport ===
The city of Abilene is served by Abilene Regional Airport.

== Notable people ==
- Ken Baumann, actor
- Raleigh Brown, member of the Texas House of Representatives and a state-court judge
- Doyle Brunson, two-time World Series of Poker champion, attended and played basketball at Hardin–Simmons College
- Randall "Tex" Cobb, heavyweight boxer and actor
- Charles Coody, Masters-winning professional golfer (from Stamford and Abilene) — graduate of ACU
- Carole Cook, an actress, was born January 14, 1924, in Abilene as Mildred Frances Cook
- Roy Crane, nationally syndicated cartoonist (Wash Tubbs, Captain Easy, Buz Sawyer)
- Dorian, hip hop recording artist, was born in Abilene
- Bob Estes, professional golfer
- W. C. Friley, first president of Hardin–Simmons University, 1892–1894
- Billy Gillispie, former Texas Tech University Red Raiders, Kentucky, and Texas A&M men's basketball coach
- Ryan Guzman, actor
- Homer Hailey (1903–2000), Church of Christ clergyman and professor at Abilene Christian University
- David W. Harper (born 1961), actor, played James Robert Walton on CBS television series The Waltons, 1972–1981
- Kristy Hawkins (born 1980), IFBB professional bodybuilder
- Jerry Herron (born 1949), dean of Wayne State University Honors College
- Katie Hill, former U.S. congresswoman from CA-25
- Micah P. Hinson, indie rock singer
- Gregory Hoblit, film director
- Robert Dean Hunter, member of Texas House of Representatives from Abilene, 1986–2007; vice president emeritus of Abilene Christian University
- Bill Jones, former NFL player for the Kansas City Chiefs
- Morgan Jones, railroad builder
- Rainy Day Jordan, Playboy playmate (Miss December 2011)
- Ashley Kavanaugh, public official and former political aide; wife of Supreme Court Justice Brett Kavanaugh
- Case Keenum, quarterback for the Houston Texans
- Johnny Knox, former wide receiver for the Chicago Bears
- John Lackey, former starting pitcher for the Chicago Cubs
- Deirdre Lovejoy, best known for her role as Assistant State's Attorney Rhonda Pearlman on HBO's The Wire
- Billy Maxwell, golfer, winner of seven PGA Tour events
- Mildred Paxton Moody, wife of Governor Dan Moody
- Bobby Morrow, three-time gold medal winner at 1956 Olympic Games in Melbourne, named Sportsman of the Year in 1956 by Sports Illustrated
- Scott Nagy, head coach of the Wright State University men's basketball team, and former head coach for South Dakota State University men's basketball
- Billy Olson, pole vaulter (1988 Summer Olympics, for the U.S. team that boycotted the 1980 Summer Olympics); held several world records
- Ty O'Neal, rodeo cowboy and film actor
- Terry Orr, tight end for the Washington Redskins — played for CHS
- Fess Parker (1924–2010), actor and hotel and winery owner, attended Hardin–Simmons University, played football at HSU before transferring to University of Texas, starred in TV as Davy Crockett and Daniel Boone
- Lee Roy Parnell, country musician
- Vinnie Paul (1964–2018), born in Abilene; musician, co-founder, and drummer of heavy metal band Pantera and Damageplan, drummer of Hellyeah
- Charles Perry, member of Texas Senate from Lubbock, was born in Abilene in 1962
- Dominic Rhodes, born in Waco Texas, football player for Cooper High School, NFL football player for Indianapolis Colts
- Lou Halsell Rodenberger, author and biographer of Jane Gilmore Rushing, professor at McMurry University
- Rick Roderick, philosopher
- Bill Sharman, Hall-of-Fame NBA basketball player and coach, born in Abilene
- Jessica Simpson, singer and actress, born in Abilene
- Jorge A. Solis (born 1951), U.S. federal judge, 5th Circuit
- Rawson Stovall, video game producer/designer, author, and first nationally syndicated reviewer of video games
- Steven Stucky, Pulitzer Prize-winning American composer
- Sarah Weddington, lawyer, represented "Jane Roe" in case of Roe v. Wade
- Ann Wedgeworth, actress
- Mason Williams, musician, best known for his guitar instrumental "Classical Gas"

== Sister cities ==
- Abilene, Kansas

== See also ==
- List of museums in West Texas
- Abilene CityLink
- Abilene paradox

== Bibliography ==
- "Abilene". Texas State Gazetteer and Business Directory. St. Louis: R.L. Polk & Co. 1884.
- "Abilene". Texas State Gazetteer and Business Directory. Detroit: R.L. Polk & Co. 1890.
- Abilene City Directory. Dallas: John F. Worley Directory Co. 1919 – via University of North Texas.
- Federal Writers' Project (1940), "Abilene", Texas: a Guide to the Lone Star State, American Guide Series, New York: Hastings House, pp. 470–472, hdl:2027/mdp.39015002677667 – via HathiTrust
- Abilene City Directory. Dallas: John F. Worley Directory Co. 1946 – via University of North Texas.
- Abilene...On Catclaw Creek: A Profile of a West Texas Town (Abilene, Texas: Reporter Publishing, 1969)
- Katharyn Duff and Betty Kay Seibt. Catclaw Country: An Informal History of Abilene in West Texas (Burnet, Texas: Eakin Press, 1980)
- Fane Downs, ed. The Future Great City of West Texas: Abilene, 1881–1981 (Abilene: Richardson, 1981).
- Paul D. Lack et al. The History of Abilene (Abilene, Texas: McMurry College, 1981)
- Juanita Daniel Zachry. Abilene (Northridge, California: Windsor, 1986).
- Tracy M. Shilcutt; David A. Coffey; Donald S. Frazier (2000). Historic Abilene: An Illustrated History. San Antonio: Historical Publishing Network "for the Abilene Preservation League". ISBN 978-1-893619-06-7.
- David J. Wishart, ed. (2004). "Cities and Towns: Abilene, Texas". Encyclopedia of the Great Plains. University of Nebraska Press. ISBN 0-8032-4787-7. Archived from the original on October 4, 2022.
- Donald S. Frazier; Robert F. Pace (2009). Abilene Landmarks: An Illustrated Tour. State House Press. ISBN 9781933337302.
- Jack E. North (2010). Early Abilene. Images of America. Charleston, South Carolina: Arcadia. ISBN 9781439624791.
- Glenn Dromgoole; Jay Moore; Joe W. Specht, eds. (2013). Abilene Stories: From Then to Now. Abilene Christian University Press. ISBN 978-0-89112-368-2.
- Lost Abilene: Images of America, Charleston, South Carolina: Arcadia Publishing. 2013. ISBN 978-0-73859-693-8
- David G. McComb (2015). "Railroad Towns: Abilene". The City in Texas: a History. University of Texas Press. pp. 133+. ISBN 978-0-292-76746-1.
