= Kirby Lake =

- Location within Texas Location within the United States
- Location: Abilene, Texas
- Coordinates: 32°22′35.34″N 99°44′4.46″W
- Type: reservoir
- Built: 1928
- Surface area: 740 acres (300 ha)
- Max. depth: 16 ft (4.9 m)

Kirby Lake is a 740-acre man-made reservoir located on the south side of Abilene, Texas, just east of Highway 83, in the northeastern portion of Taylor County. Kirby Lake is within the Brazos River Basin, meaning that Cedar Creek, which feeds Kirby Lake, eventually feeds into the Brazos River. Kirby Lake resides in the Red Prairies portion of the Central Great Plains ecoregion. Management is under the City of Abilene.

== Hydrology ==
Kirby Lake has around 740 acres (300 hectares) of surface area, a 7,620 acre-feet of capacity, and the maximum measured depth was 16 feet (4.9 meters). The watershed which feeds Kirby Lake is around 44 square miles (110 square kilometers), and Cedar Creek is the impounded river which the dam is named after. The water level fluctuates in relation to water demand of the many uses of the reservoir. The turbidity is less than 1-foot (300 centimeters) with a red coloring. Since the dam's creation, Kirby Lake has only dried out once in 2000. In an effort to restore the lake, treated wastewater was used as an addition inflow, and by 2002 Kirby Lake was once again full. The surrounding area is mainly prairies with loamy soil. The lake is part of the Colorado River Basin (Texas), Brazos forks.

== History ==
In 1927 the Cedar Creek dam first started construction but was finished by 1928. The City of Abilene owns Kirby Lake and uses it to supply water, irrigate crops, and provide recreation to its citizens.

== Recreation ==
=== Fishing ===
Kirby Lake is a popular lake for fishing, in particular blue or other catfishes, as well as bluegill. Like most lakes in the region, largemouth bass, carp, white crappie, and other fish also live in the waters. Lake specific regulations based on minimum lengths and daily bag limits must be followed for catfish, but other fish like white crappie, saugeye, largemouth bass, and sunfishes are allowed to be caught if state regulations are being followed.

The Status of Fish Species in Kirby Lake
| Species | Poor | Fair | Good | Excellent |
|---|---|---|---|---|
| Largemouth Bass | | X | | |
| Catfish | | | | X |
| Crappie | | X | | |
| Sunfish | | | X | |

=== Boating ===
Most people fish directly from the banks rather than using a boat, however there are two boat ramps and a handicap accessible fishing pier connected to the city park located on the east side of Kirby Lake.

== Wildlife ==
=== Management ===
Texas Parks and Wildlife Department monitored the fish populations of Kirby Lake to determine the best management plans. According to the most current surveys, the most pervasive predator is the bluegill which competes with the gizzard shad, but most fish populations varied more according to angling fishing interests. The lake has been stocked with fish numerous times in its history, but the most current time was when 40,000 Florida largemouth bass were released in 2014. The current management strategies include monitoring fish populations using a variety of capture and release methods, upgrading the park aesthetically with the assistance of the City of Abilene, invasive species education, and improved ability for more surveys to be done about the ecosystem.

=== Fauna ===
The lake is known for a number of bird species, including pectoral sandpiper, cactus wren, Baird's sandpiper, and the more rare long-tailed jaeger, red knot, and red phalarope. Desert cardinals, scarlet tanagers, and various waterfowl can also be seen in their spring and fall migrations.

The entire region is known for its diversity in butterflies, and the greatest variety can be found at Kirby Lake: Pipevine swallowtail, sleepy orange, Reakirt's blue, Horace's duskywing, tawny emperor, common buckeye, sachem, and others.

The most populous fish are:

- largemouth bass
- channel catfish
- blue catfish
- saugeye
- white crappie
- bluegill
- green sunfish
- common carp
- gizzard shad

=== Flora ===
The most populous hydrophilic vegetation are:

- bulrush
- black willow
- salt cedar
