= Abilene CityLink =

Operator of bus transportation in Abilene, Texas

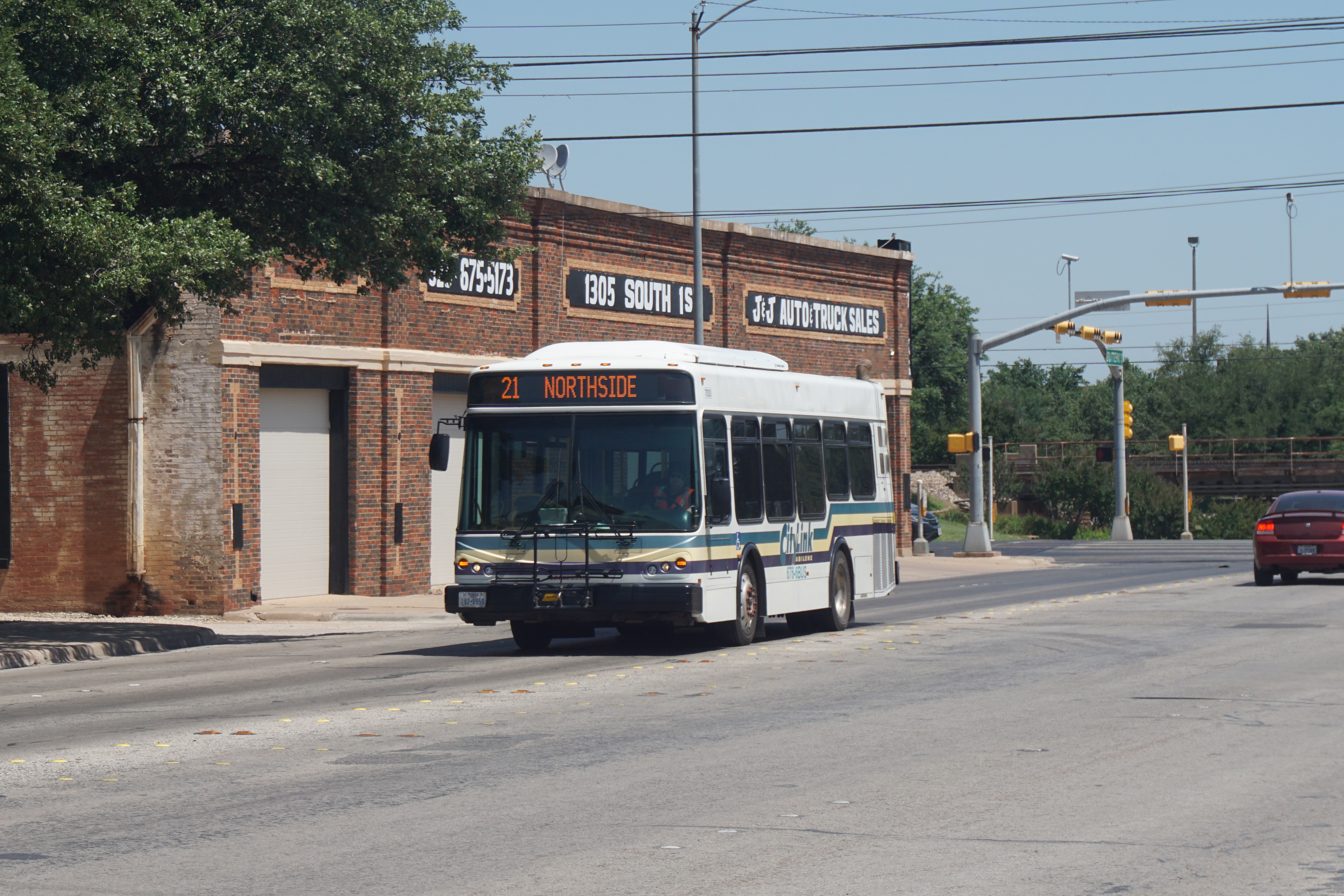
- CityLink bus
- Headquarters: 1189 S. 2nd Street
- Locale: Abilene, Texas
- Service area: Taylor County, Texas; Jones County, Texas
- Service type: bus service, paratransit
- Routes: 14
- Operator: First Transit
- Website: CityLink

Abilene CityLink is the operator of public transportation in metropolitan Abilene, Texas. Service is provided six days per week along 8 regular routes, 6 Saturday routes, 1 shuttle, and on-call service.

== Bus routes ==
- 2 ACU
- 3 Zoo/Pine
- 6 Mall
- 7 Southwest Wal-Mart
- 8 Dyess
- 9 Five Points
- 10 Willis/Mockingbird
- 12 Hendrick/Old Anson
- Cisco Shuttle
- On-Call Service
- 21 Northside Saturday
- 23 Zoo/Northeast Wal-Mart Saturday
- 26 Buffalo Gap/Mall Saturday
- 28 Southwest Wal-Mart Saturday
- 29 Westgate Saturday
- 30 Crosstown Saturday

=== Routes prior to June 4, 2018 ===
- 1 Downtown Trolley (replaced by restructured Routes 2, 3, and 10)
- 2 ACU/Northeast Wal-Mart (restructured and renamed Route 2 ACU)
- 3 Radford Hills/Judge Ely (merged with the 13 Hickory/Pine to form 3 Zoo/Pine)
- 5 South Treadaway/Cisco (discontinued; later service to the area was brought back with a Route 10 extension, the Cisco Shuttle, and On-Call service)
- 6 Mall/ARMC (replaced by restructured Route 7)
- 7 Barrow/Southwest (restructured and renamed 7 Southwest Wal-Mart)
- 8 South 14th/South Clack (replaced by new Route 6 Mall and revised Route 7 Southwest Wal-Mart)
- 9 Westgate (split into 8 Dyess and 9 Five Points in June 2018)
- 10 North Willis (restructured and renamed 10 Willis/Mockingbird)
- 11 Grape/Mockingbird (merged with the 12 Hickory/Grape to form 12 Hendrick/Old Anson)
- 12 Hickory/Grape (merged with the 11 Grape & Mockingbird to form 12 Hendrick/Old Anson)
- 13 Hickory/Pine (merged with the 3 Radford Hills/Judge Ely to form 3 Zoo/Pine)
- 22 Judge Ely/Northeast Wal-Mart Saturday (restructured and renamed 23 Zoo/Northeast Wal-Mart Saturday)
- 26 Buffalo Gap/Mall Saturday
- 28 South 14th/Southwest Wal-Mart Saturday (renamed 28 Southwest Wal-Mart Saturday)
- 29 Westgate Saturday
- 30 Crosstown Ambler Saturday (restructured and renamed 30 Crosstown Saturday)
- 31 Grape/North 12th Saturday (replaced by new 21 Northside Saturday in June 2018)
- 32 Hickory Saturday (replaced by new 21 Northside Saturday and restructured Crosstown Ambler Saturday in June 2018)

=== Routes prior to January 4, 2010 ===
- 1 North Willis (Renumbered Route 10)
- 2 Radford Hills (Restructured and renamed Route 3 Radford Hills/Judge Ely)
- 3 North Mockingbird (Restructured and renamed Route 11 Grape/Mockingbird)
- 4 South 7th (Discontinued in 2007/2008 as it duplicated Routes 6 and 10, with one portion being transferred to Route 6; restored on June 4, 2018, as Route 8 Dyess)
- 5 Hickory (Restructured and renamed Route 12 Hickory/Grape)
- 6 Westgate (Renumbered Route 9)
- 7 ACU (Split into Route 2 ACU/Northeast Wal-Mart and Route 13 Hickory/Pine)
- 8 South 14th (Restructured and renamed Route 8 South 14th/South Clack)
- 9 Mall/Cooper (Restructured and renamed Route 6 Mall/ARMC)
- 10 Mall/South Clack (Restructured and renamed Route 7 Barrow/Southwest)
- 11 Town Trolley (Renumbered Route 1)
- 12 State school (Restructured and renamed Route 5 South Treadaway/Cisco)
