= KABW =

Radio station in Abilene, Texas

- Baird, Texas; United States
- Broadcast area: Abilene, Texas
- Frequency: 95.1 MHz
- Branding: 95One The Wolf

Programming
- Format: Country music

Ownership
- Owner: Community Broadcast Partners LLC
- Sister stations: KORQ

History
- First air date: 1981
- Former call signs: KVMX (1981–1999); KAGT (1999–2002); KNCE (2002–2004); KORQ (2004–2012)

Technical information
- Licensing authority: FCC
- Facility ID: 39159
- Class: C1
- ERP: 100,000 watts
- HAAT: 226 meters (741 ft)
- Transmitter coordinates: 32°17′06″N 99°38′39″W

Links
- Public license information: Public file; LMS
- Webcast: Listen live
- Website: wolfabilene.com

KABW (95.1 FM) is an American country music radio station, licensed to Baird, Texas, a town near Abilene, Texas. KABW's on-air personalities include Wolf Mornings with Kate & Kaden, Lisa Thomas, Randy Brooks.

== History ==
On September 11, 2012, KORQ's Callsign changed KABW and its format changed from CHR to country.
