= KORQ =

Coordinates: 32.215°N 99.890°W

- Winters, Texas; United States
- Broadcast area: Abilene, Texas
- Frequency: 96.1 MHz
- Branding: Q Country 96.1

Programming
- Format: Farm/classic country

Ownership
- Owner: Community Broadcast Partners
- Sister stations: KABW

History
- First air date: 1999 (as KAFR)
- Former call signs: KAFR (3/1999-4/1999); KLGD (4/1999-6/1999); KATX (1999–2000); KORQ (2000–2004); KNCE (2004–2007); KGXL (2007–2010); KFNA (2010–2012)

Technical information
- Licensing authority: FCC
- Facility ID: 84288
- Class: C2
- ERP: 50,000 watts
- HAAT: 150 meters

Links
- Public license information: Public file; LMS
- Webcast: Listen Live
- Website: qcountryradio.com

KORQ (96.1 FM) is a commercial radio station broadcasting to the Abilene, Texas, area. KORQ airs a farm/classic country format branded as "Q Country 96.1".

== History ==
On September 11, 2012, the format of 96.1 FM was changed from news/talk "Fox News Abilene" to contemporary hits. The format was moved from KORQ's sister station on 95.1 in Baird, Texas, now KABW "The Wolf".

On June 3, 2020, KORQ changed their format from top 40/CHR to farm/classic country, branded as "Q Country 96.1".
