= Jerry Herron =

American academic administrator

Jerry Herron is an American academic, the founding dean and dean emeritus of the Irvin D. Reid Honors College at Wayne State University, and the former president of the National Collegiate Honors Council.

== Education and career ==
Herron graduated from the University of Texas at Austin in 1971, and attended Indiana University for graduate study, earning a master's degree in 1974 and completing his Ph.D. in 1980. He joined Wayne State as an assistant professor of English in 1980, was promoted to full professor in 1993, and retired in 2019. He became founding dean of the Reid Honors College in 2008, and stepped down to become dean emeritus in 2018.

He served as president of the National Collegiate Honors Council for 2015–2016. He was named an NCHC Fellow in 2018.

== Books ==
Herron has written two books: Universities and the Myth of Cultural Decline (1988) and AfterCulture: Detroit and the Humiliation of History (1993).
