= Morgan Jones (railroad builder) =

American railroad builder (1839–1926)

Morgan Jones (7 October 1839 – 11 April 1926) was an American railroad builder, born in Wales.

== Early life ==
Morgan Jones was born at Tregynon, near Newtown in Powys, Wales, the son of Morgan Jones and Mary Charles Jones. He worked on the family farm as a young man, but served an apprenticeship with the Cambrian Railways before he emigrated in 1866.

== Career ==
In America he became foreman of a construction crew on the Union Pacific Railroad, with Grenville M. Dodge as his mentor. He was present for the driving of the "Golden Spike" joining the rails of the First transcontinental railroad in 1869. In 1876 he was hired by Grenville Dodge, then at the Texas & Pacific Railway, to finish an extension project into Fort Worth. He brought the construction in on time, within a strict deadline from the state legislature, and was hailed as a local hero for the timely completion.

Jones went on to build and operate hundreds of miles of railroad, mostly in Texas, mostly without land subsidies. He was president of the Fort Worth & Denver City Railway, one of his most successful projects. He was also director of the Wichita Valley Railway Company.

== Personal life ==
Jones was a bachelor. Two of his nephews from Wales, Morgan C. Jones and Percy Jones, joined him in the Texas railroad business. He lived in Abilene, Texas, at the Hotel Grace in his later years, and died in 1926, age 86.

In 2014 there was a segment on BBC Radio Cymru about Morgan Jones the Texas railroad man. His great-nephew Grant Jones was a longtime Texas state legislator.
