= Robert Dean Hunter =

American politician (1928–2023)

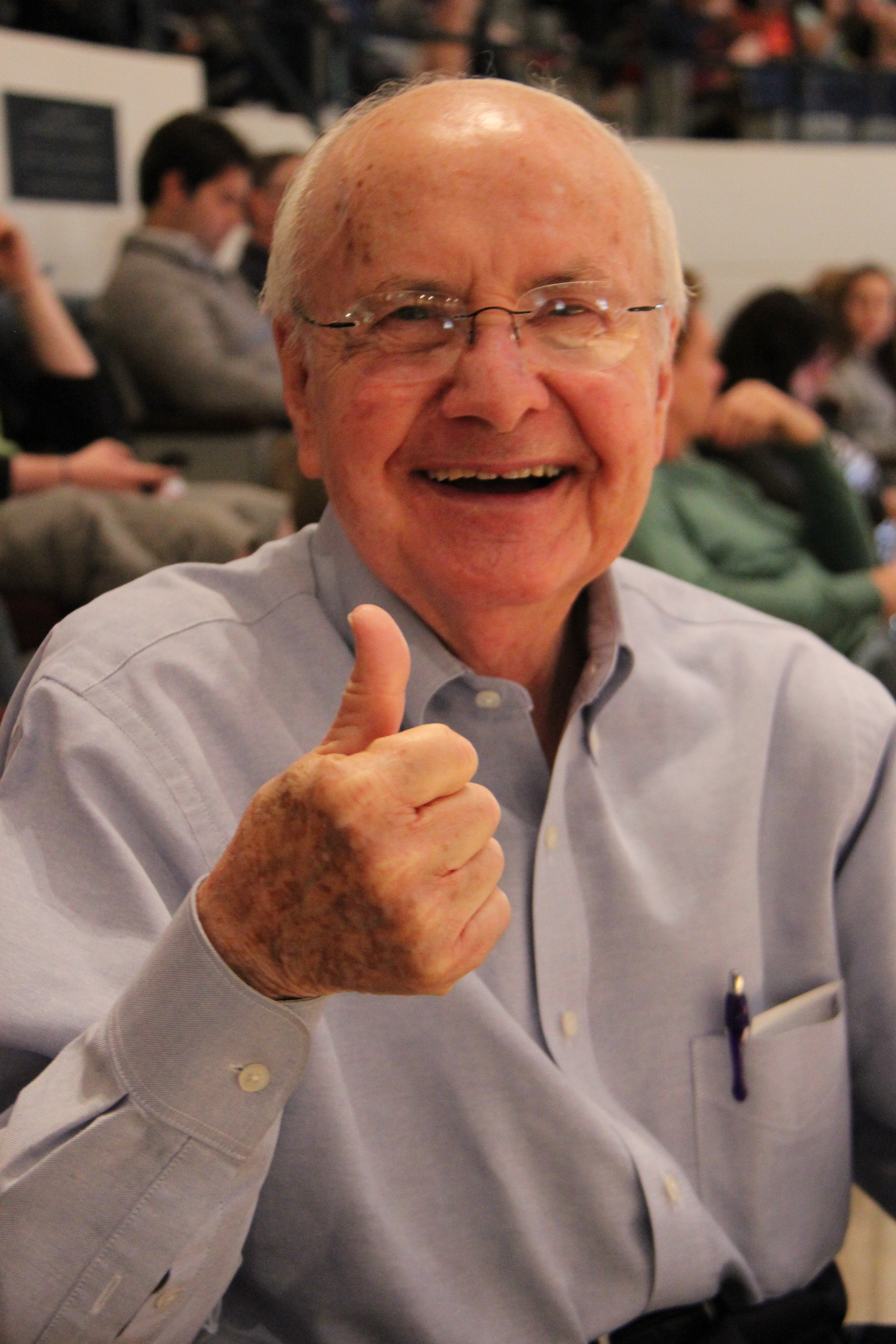
- Bob Hunter

Member of the Texas House of Representatives from the 71st district
- In office August 15, 1986 – January 9, 2007
- Preceded by: Gary E. Thompson
- Succeeded by: Susan King

Personal details
- Born: June 25, 1928 Dodge City, Kansas, U.S.
- Died: February 11, 2023 (aged 94)
- Party: Republican
- Spouse: Shirley Long Hunter
- Education: Abilene Christian University
- Occupation: Vice-president emeritus of Abilene Christian University

Robert Dean Hunter (June 25, 1928 – February 11, 2023) was an American politician and academic administrator. He served as vice president at Church of Christ-affiliated Abilene Christian University in Abilene, Texas, and as a Republican member of the Texas House of Representatives, in which from 1986 to 2007 he represented District 71.

On August 9, 1986, Hunter won a special election with 50.5 percent of the ballots cast to fill the District 71 House seat vacated by the Democrat Gary E. Thompson, who resigned on June 2. Hunter became the first Republican since Reconstruction to represent Abilene and Taylor County in the state legislature.

Hunter and his wife, the former Shirley M. Long (born c. 1933), resided in Abilene from 1956. The 57,000-square-foot Hunter Welcome Center, named in their honor, was dedicated at ACU in 2009. Hunter died on February 11, 2023, at the age of 94.

Texas House of Representatives
Preceded by Gary E. Thompson	Texas State Representative from District 71 (then Taylor and Nolan counties; now Taylor, Jones, and Nolan); 1986–2007	Succeeded by Susan King
