= Susan King (Texas politician) =

American politician

Member of the Texas House of Representatives from the 71st district
- In office 2007–2017
- Preceded by: Robert Dean Hunter
- Succeeded by: Stan Lambert

Personal details
- Born: 1952 (age 73–74) Houston, Texas, US
- Party: Republican
- Education: University of Texas at Austin; Abilene Christian University

Susan Lewis King, who was born in November 1952, to parents Allen Lubbock Lewis and Martha Ann Jameson. Her original name was Susan Jane Lewis. She was an American Republican politician who represented District 71 in the Texas House of Representatives from 2007 to 2017. In June 5 of 1976, she married Austin Irwin King in Harris, Texas, United States of America.

== Biography ==
King studied nursing at the University of Texas at Austin and worked as a nurse for over 35 years.

In 2016, King was one of six candidates in the Republican primary to replace retiring state senator, Troy Fraser in Texas Senate District 24. In the March 1, 2016, primary she received 27% of the vote, with Dawn Buckingham receiving 25% of the vote. Because neither candidate received a majority, they advanced to a runoff election in May. After a contentious campaign focusing on the records and geographic profiles of the two candidates, Buckingham won the runoff with over 60% of the vote.

After leaving politics she obtained her master’s degree in social work and Christian ministry at Abilene Christian University. She has two grandchildren named Austin and Blake Stockstill who live in Charlotte, North Carolina. She has three children, Helen King, Martha, and, Lewis. They all have children of their own except, Martha. She is a passionate grandma and loves her children dearly, she divorced her husband, Austin King, later in life. She lives in apartment in Abilene now.

The King family has some ties to Texas Governor, Sam Houston and still mostly lives in Texas to this day.
