= Lou Halsell Rodenberger =

American journalist (1926–2009)

- Born: September 21, 1926; Eastland County, Texas, U.S.
- Died: April 9, 2009 (aged 82); Callahan County, Texas, U.S.
- Occupations: Author, professor
- Spouse(s): Charles A. Rodenberger (m. September 3, 1949–April 9, 2009; her death)
- Children: Kathryn Sue Rodenberger Wilcox; Charles Mark Rodenberger

Molcie Lou Halsell Rodenberger (September 21, 1926 – April 9, 2009) was an American author, editor, professor, and journalist. As an editor and author, she is best known for her books Texas Women Writers: A Tradition of Their Own (1997) and Let's Hear It: Stories by Texas Women Writers (2003), both co-edited with Sylvia Grider.
