= Wylie, Taylor County, Texas =

Wylie
- Unincorporated community
- Location within the state of Texas Wylie (the United States)
- Coordinates: 32°22′22″N 99°46′31″W
- Country: United States
- State: Texas
- County: Taylor
- Time zone: UTC-6 (Central (CST))
  - Summer (DST): UTC-5 (CDT)
- GNIS feature ID: 1350622

Wylie is an unincorporated community in Taylor County, Texas, United States. The once predominantly rural area has developed into a thriving suburban bedroom community as the city of Abilene expanded in the latter half of the 20th century. A significant portion of Wylie now lies within the city limits of Abilene, although a few areas often associated with the community are located outside of the city and remain unincorporated.

Though much of Wylie is now located within the far southern portion of Abilene, the area has retained a distinct identity through its public school system, the Wylie Independent School District.

== Geography ==
Wylie is located approximately five miles southwest of downtown Abilene along FM 89 (Buffalo Gap Road) in the northeastern portion of Taylor County. Wylie is part of the Abilene, Texas Metropolitan Statistical Area, which includes all of Taylor, Jones, and Callahan Counties.

== History ==
Wylie was named after J. J. Wylie, an early settler, who moved Taylor County in 1880. The first settlers farmed in the Wylie area beginning in 1881, but Wylie as a community did not develop until 1902, when John H. Vance arrived from Austin, Texas. Vance purchased several acres of land southwest of Abilene, and built the first general store. Vance included a residence attached at the back for his family. The structure was located on the southwestern corner of what is now the intersection of Buffalo Gap Road and Antilley Road. The store was known as Vances Corner.

That same year with the population growing, residents went to Mary V. Wylie, widow of J. J. Wylie, for assistance with a school and church. Mary donated land across the road to the north of the Vance store.

The Wylie school district was designated in 1888, but records indicate that the school did not operate until 1902.

In 1902, three prominent citizens contributed $120 apiece for the purchase of materials, and several residents got together to build a building for use as both a school and a church.

In 1904, John Vance installed a post office in his store and named it Sambo, for "Brother Sam", his good friend and neighbor Sam Little. The Sambo post office operated from December 1904 until February 1912, when Abilene began rural postal delivery.

By 1915, the student population outgrew its current building. In her donation of land, Mrs. Wylie stipulated that the name of the school be changed to Wylie, in honor of her late husband. The citizens accepted her terms and voted for a $3,000 bond issue. A two-story plank building was constructed in 1916 and named Wylie School.

Wylie's population has increased exponentially in the past several decades due to continued growth of the Abilene Metropolitan Statistical Area.

== Education ==
The Wylie community is served by the Wylie Independent School District (ISD). The fast-growing district also serves other portions of south Abilene, the unincorporated communities of Potosi, Caps, and View, and other predominantly rural areas of east central Taylor County. All of WISD's campuses are located within the Abilene city limits.
