= Merkel High School =

Location
- 2000 South 7th Street; Merkel, Texas 79536; United States; 32.2138°N 99.7967°W

Information
- School type: Public High School
- School district: Merkel Independent School District
- Principal: Rocky Reed
- Teaching staff: 34.19 (FTE)
- Grades: 9-12
- Enrollment: 295 (2023–2024)
- Student to teacher ratio: 8.63
- Colors: Purple, gold, and white
- Athletics conference: UIL Class 3A
- Mascot: Badger
- Yearbook: The Claw
- Website: Merkel High School

Merkel High School is a public high school located in Merkel, Texas, United States, and classified as a 3A school by the UIL. It is part of the Merkel Independent School District. The high school serves approximately 330 students from areas on the Northwestern part of Taylor County. Generally students from the area come from either Merkel, Tye, or Trent. A small portion of southwestern Jones County lies within the district also. The district and the school are both named after the Baylor Merkel, the first settler in the area. In 2016, the school was rated "Met Standard" by the Texas Education Agency.

== Athletics ==
The Merkel Badgers compete in these sports -

Cross Country, Football, Basketball, Powerlifting, Golf, Track, Softball, Volleyball & Baseball

=== State titles ===
Men’s Pole Vault • 1978(2A)-Brad Pursley

Girls 100m hurdles 2007(2A) - Carly Szabo, 2008(2A) - Carly Szabo, 2010(2A) - Carly Szabo

Girls 300m hurdles 2007(2A) - Carly Szabo, 2008(2A) - Carly Szabo

- Girls High Jump -
  - 2015(3A) - Abigail Lally, 2016(3A) - Abigail Lally
- (2023) Women’s Powerlifting
  - Avery Chacon

==== State finalists ====
- Girls Basketball -
  - 2013(2A)
- 100m hurdles silver medalist 2009(2A)- Carly Szabo
- 300m hurdles silver medalist 2009(2A)- Carly Szabo
- High Jump Bronze Medalist 2008(2A)- Carly Szabo, Bronze medalist 2009(2A)- Carly Szabo, Silver medalist 2010(2A)- Carly Szabo

== Academics ==
The Merkel High School Academics teams compete in these events -

Computer Sciences, Computer Applications, Extemporaneous Speaking, Dramatic Interpretation, Mathematics, Social Studies, Literary Criticism, Debate

== Notable alumni ==
- Cody Lambert, rodeo star
