= Wylie High School (Abilene, Texas) =

Coordinates: 32°22′32″N 99°46′59″W

Location
- 4502 Antilley Rd; Abilene, Texas 79606-5907; United States

Information
- School type: Public high school
- Motto: It is great to be a Wylie Bulldog!
- School district: Wylie Independent School District
- Principal: Reagan Berry
- Staff: 99.36 (FTE)
- Grades: 9-12
- Enrollment: 1,517 (2023–2024)
- Student to teacher ratio: 15.27
- Colors: Purple & Gold
- Athletics conference: UIL Class AAAAA
- Mascot: Bulldog/Lady Dog
- Yearbook: Growl
- Website: Official website

Wylie High School is a public high school located in Abilene, Texas, United States. It is the sole high school of the Wylie Independent School District. Wylie ISD serves the southernmost areas of Abilene, as well as the ever-growing suburbs and exurbs in east central Taylor County. WHS is one of three class 5A high schools within the city limits of Abilene, joining Abilene Independent School District schools Abilene High and Abilene Cooper. In 2008, Wylie High School was named a National Blue Ribbon School. In 2015, the school was rated "Met Standard" by the Texas Education Agency. In 2017, the school reported an enrollment of 1,164, putting it 14 students above the number needed to realign to conference 5A.

In order to avoid confusion with the identically named Wylie High School in the Dallas-Fort Worth Metroplex suburb of Wylie, the school is commonly referred to as Abilene Wylie.

== Athletics ==
The Wylie Bulldogs compete in the following sports : cross country, volleyball, football, basketball, swimming, soccer, golf, tennis, track, disc golf, softball, and baseball.

- UIL Lone Star Cup Champions
  - 2001(3A), 2006(3A)

=== State Titles ===
- Girls Basketball -
  - 1970(1A), 1990(3A), 2011(3A), 2012(3A)
- Football -
  - 2004(3A/D1)
- Boys Golf -
  - 1987(3A), 1992(3A)
- Team Tennis -
  - 2013(3A), 2014(4A), 2016(4A), 2017(4A)
- Volleyball -
  - 2012(3A)
- Baseball -
  - 2016(4A), 2017(4A)

==== State finalists ====
- Girls Basketball -
  - 2001(3A), 2006(3A), 2010(3A), 2015(4A)
- Football -
  - 2000(3A/D1), 2009(3A/D1), 2016(4A/D1)
- Team Tennis -
  - 2015(4A), 2018(5A)
- Boys Basketball -
  - 2007(3A), 2013(3A)
- Baseball -
  - 1990(3A), 1997(3A), 2002(3A), 2006(3A), 2007(3A), 2015(4A)

=== Football ===
Under the leadership of future NFL quarterback Case Keenum, the Bulldogs won their first Division 3A-1 State Championship in 2004. The Bulldogs reached two more State Championship games, but were defeated by Gilmer High School in 2009 and Carthage High School in 2016. Prior to 2004, the Bulldogs played for the state championship in 2000 but were defeated by Gatesville 14–10.

=== Team Tennis ===
Due to the above-mentioned rule change Wylie, until 2018, has competed in the same conference since 1976. Wylie team tennis has actually won a total of 14 of the last 16 state tournaments. The only state wins listed above are those in UIL. UIL has only hosted a team tennis state tournament since 2013, Wylie has appeared in all of them and has won all but one. Prior to 2013 Wylie competed in the Texas Tennis Coaches Association state tournament and won 11 of their last 12 tournaments.

== Band ==
The Wylie High School Band is officially named the "Pure Gold Band". In 2002, with their show “New World”, the band advanced to the UIL State Marching Championship for the second time in its history and advanced to finals for the only time in its history. The semi-official theme of the band is "It Is Well", which is played at the end of every concert and football game.

=== Marching band ===
==== Region marching ====
- Division 1 ranking since 1986
  - Celebrated 30th Division 1 ranking in 2016

==== Area marching ====
- 16 Area appearances
- Top three ranking in 7 contest years
  - 1994(3A), 2002(3A), 2008(3A), 2010(3A), 2012(3A), 2014(4A), 2016(4A)

==== State marching ====
- 1994
- 2002 “New World” (5th place finalist)
- 2008 “New World Symphony”
- 2010 "Rhythm's Revenge"
- 2012 “Time”
- 2014 “Honor and Remember”
- 2016 “The Story of Our Home”

=== Concert bands ===
The Wylie Band operates an Honor band and Symphonic band during the concert season.

== Notable alumni ==
- Case Keenum, record-setting quarterback of the Houston Cougars football team, NFL quarterback for the Washington Commanders, Cleveland Browns, Minnesota Vikings, Denver Broncos, Houston Texans, and Chicago Bears of the National Football League, and part-owner of Haak Winery
- Clay Johnston, linebacker for the Cincinnati Bengals
- Ty O'Neal, actor
- Ernie Park, former offensive lineman for the San Diego Chargers, Miami Dolphins, Denver Broncos, and Cincinnati Bengals
- Gordon Wood, 396 wins, 91 losses, and 15 ties in 43 seasons as a Texas high school head football coach
