= Lytle Lake =

Lake in Texas, United States

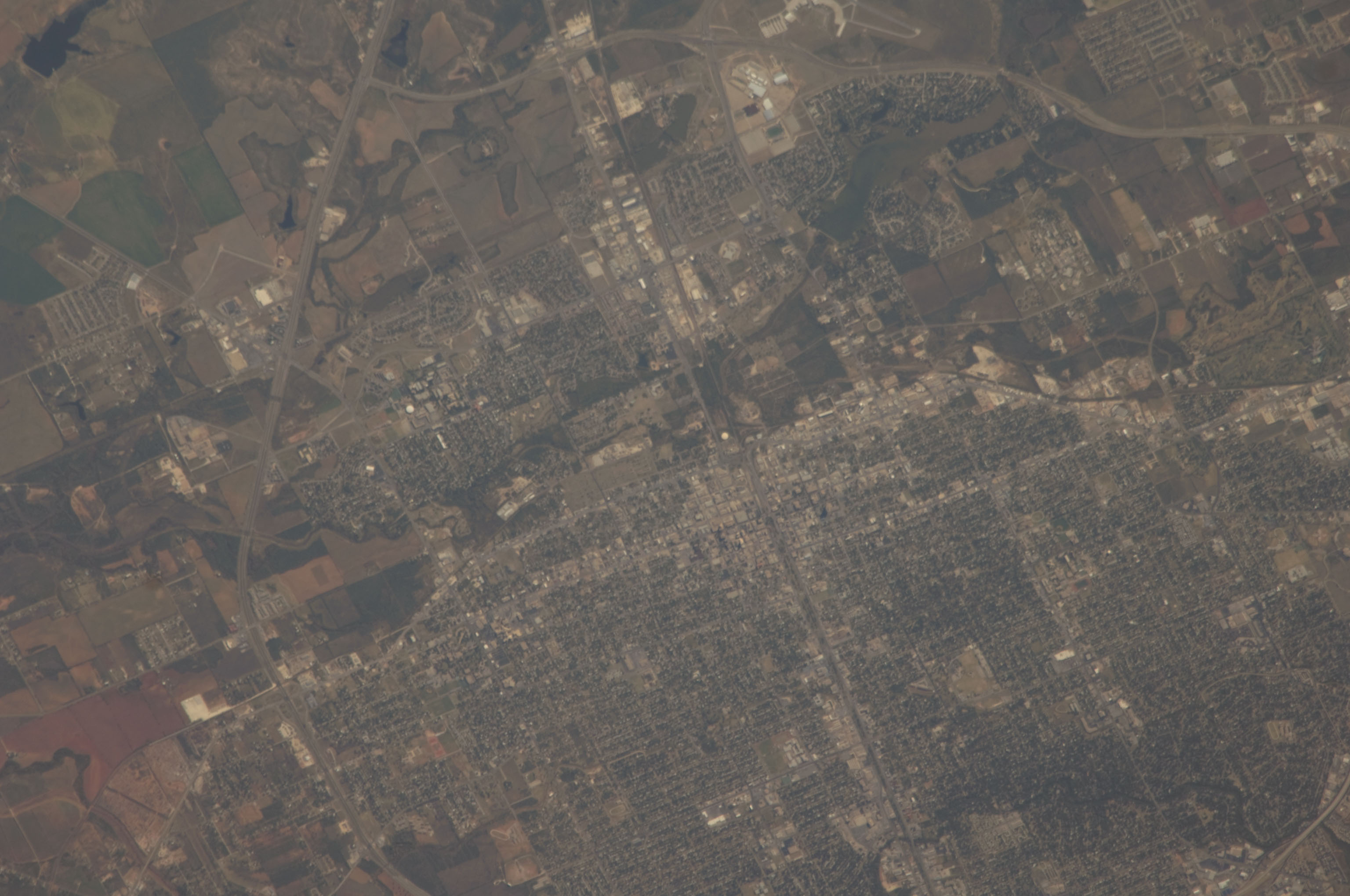
- Lytle Lake (top center) as seen from the International Space Station

- Location of Lytle Lake within Texas
- Location: Taylor County, Texas, United States
- Coordinates: 32°25′36.2″N 99°42′20.5″W
- Managing agency: Central and Southwest, Inc.
- Built: 1897
- Surface area: 656 acres (265 ha)
- Surface elevation: 520 metres (1,710 ft)

Lytle Lake is a reservoir in southeast Abilene, Texas, United States. The reservoir stands directly northwest of Abilene Regional Airport. The reservoir was created via dam in 1897, by the Lytle Water Company—jointly owned by J. G. Lowden and Otto W. Steffens—in order bring in contractors to build what was at the time Texas' only hospital for epileptics. The embankment dam began construction on April 1, 1897, and a rainstorm on June 14 filled the lake.

The dam cracked on November 23, 1913 during a rainstorm, and was replaced concrete dam. Built by the American Public Service Company, they had a monopoly on local utilities. The dam dried during the droughts caused by the winter of 1917–18, which gave other waterbodies priority for water usage. In 1923, the West Texas Utilities Company used Lytle Lake to serve power for its power station. In the 1930s, the American Public Service Company sold the lake to Central and Southwest, Inc.—another power company. The lake dried again in July 1952, and its bed was excavated and cleaned. The lake was offered to the people of Abilene, who declined. The lake is now used recreationally. A privately owned lake, it faces issues with pollutions, and many of its fish end up dead.
