= Inkum, Texas =

Ghost town in Texas, United States

Inkum is a ghost town located in southwestern Taylor County, Texas, United States, located 10 miles (16 km) south of Merkel, between Farm Road 89 and U.S. Highway 277.

== History ==
Inkum was established as a post office in 1903 by H.M Puckett to serve the farmers settling into what was a ranching area, running it out of his general store until its relocation to the Wilson ranch in 1908. The Inkum school operated at the same time for several years. The community had a population of 50 in 1914 but then declined when most of the local farms were purchased and then utilized for large-scale ranching, and so the post office was closed in 1915. By 1930, Inkum no longer appeared on maps and had faded away.
