= Eula, Texas =

- Unincorporated community
- Location within the state of Texas Eula (the United States)
- Coordinates: 32°20′32″N 99°33′42″W
- Country: United States
- State: Texas
- County: Callahan
- Elevation: 1,975 ft (602 m)

Population (1990)
  - Total: 125
- Time zone: UTC-6 (Central (CST))
  - Summer (DST): UTC-5 (CDT)
- GNIS feature ID: 1335536

Eula is an unincorporated community in Callahan County, Texas, United States. According to the Handbook of Texas, the community had a population of 125 in 2000. It is part of the Abilene, Texas Metropolitan Statistical Area.

== History ==
A post office was founded at Eula in 1889 and remained in operation until 1913. W.B. Ferguson served as postmaster. Other early settlers in the area were Wylie Miller, Ison Harris, Jules Janette, and Jim Massie, alongside the Merrick, Gardner, and Farrar families. Only 17 people lived in Eula in 1903. It experienced a brief revival, growing to 75 residents being served by three churches and stores. The population further grew to 125 from 1990 through 2000.

The House of Yahweh is headquartered in Eula.

== Geography ==
Eula is located on Farm to Market Road 603, 7 mi (11 km) southwest of Clyde, 14 mi (23 km) southwest of Baird, and 15 mi (24 km) east of Abilene in western Callahan County.

== Education ==
Eula had its own school in 1940. Today, the community is served by the Eula Independent School District and is home to Eula High School.

== Notable people ==
- Jack Favor, rodeo star falsely imprisoned in 1967 in Louisiana for two murders for which he was framed, released with acquittal in a second trial in 1974; was born in Eula in 1911.
- Brandon Gill, a Texas congressman that grew up in Eula.
