= Trent Independent School District =

School district in Texas

Coordinates: 32°29′40″N 100°7′59″W

Trent Independent School District is a public school district based in Trent, Texas (USA).

Located in Taylor County, the district extends into portions of Nolan, Jones, and Fisher counties.

In 2009, the school district was rated "academically acceptable" by the Texas Education Agency.

== Special programs ==
=== Athletics ===
Trent participates in six-man football (their mascot is the gorilla). In 2009 and 2010 the team was not very successful, winning only one game, but in 2011 and 2012 they went 8-2 somehow not making it to the playoffs. One game (over Novice) featured a state six-man record 132 points scored by Trent in that game.

== See also ==
- List of school districts in Texas
