= Academy of Technology, Engineering, Mathematics, and Science =

The Academy of Technology, Engineering, Mathematics & Science

Location
- 2034 Quantum Loop; Abilene, Taylor, Texas 79601; United States; 32.4501°N 99.7137°W

Information
- School type: High school
- Established: 2009
- Founder: John Martinez
- School district: Abilene Independent School District
- School number: 440041
- Principal: Jay Ashby
- Staff: 22.76 (FTE)
- Grades: 9-12
- Enrollment: 350 (2022–23)
- Student to teacher ratio: 14.46
- Slogan: "Rise From the Ashes."
- Website: www.abileneisd.org/o/aths

The Academy of Technology, Engineering, Mathematics and Science (ATEMS) is a STEM high school founded in 2009 located in Abilene, Texas. ATEMS is a part of the Abilene Independent School District. ATEMS is housed in premises owned by the Texas State Technical College System.

== History ==
ATEMS was originally a New Technology High School, at which all core classes were either at the AP level or college dual credit at other colleges around Abilene. ATEMS still encourages technology, but has now introduced academic classes, with an increased emphasis on engineering curricula.

== Academics ==
ATEMS offers two STEM curricula: Information Technology and Engineering. ATEMS offers both Advanced Placement or college dual-credit classes with the technical colleges in Abilene. ATEMS also offers AP Dual Credit hybrid courses, allowing students to still receive the benefit of a ten-point addition to their GPA and the ability to take the AP tests, as well receive college credit should they score a 3 or higher on the AP test. These hybrid classes are free. Both courses culminate in a year-long senior capstone project that includes a skills demonstration to the community.

ATEMS is the highest ranked high school by USNews and World Report in the Abilene, TX metropolitan area and is one of the highest-ranking high schools in both Texas and the United States.

After moving to its new building, ATEMS has also added Automotive, Culinary Arts, and Welding classes.

== Extracurricular Activities ==
Extracurricular activities at ATEMS include robotics, photography, and yearbook. ATEMS provides shuttles for students to travel to other high schools for some of the activities not available at the school, such as band, orchestra, and football. ATEMS formerly participated in a "bring your own device" (BYOD) program which allowed students to use their own technologies including iPods, iPads, cell phones, or laptops, during class, with teacher permission. This was abandoned after the 2020–2021 school year due to abuse of the privilege by browsing sites which contained adult and other prohibited contents.

== Privileges ==
ATEMS grants students special privileges which are exercised with a trust card. The ATEMS trust card is similar to an ID card on a lanyard. Privileges include: checking out school laptops if you don't own one, access to the BYOD (Bring your own device) policy (formerly - reason for cancellation in previous paragraph), the previous allowance of juniors and seniors to depart campus for lunch (canceled due to moving to the LIFT), and the ability to listen to music in class (with teacher permission).
