= Wylie Independent School District =

Wylie Independent School District can refer to:

- Wylie Independent School District (Collin County, Texas), United States
- Wylie Independent School District (Taylor County, Texas), United States
