= Wylie Independent School District (Taylor County, Texas) =

School district in Texas, United States

Address
- 6251 Buffalo Gap Road Wylie, Taylor County, Texas, 79606; United States
- Coordinates: 32.3738°N 99.7741°W

District information
- Grades: Pre-school - 12
- Established: 1901; 125 years ago
- Superintendent: Joey Light
- Schools: 8

Students and staff
- Enrollment: 5,500+
- Teachers: 368+

Other information
- Website: wyliebulldogs.org

The Wylie Independent School District is a public school district based in the far southern portion (often called Wylie) of Abilene, Texas, United States. In order to avoid confusion with the Wylie Independent School District in the Dallas–Fort Worth metroplex suburb of Wylie, the district is commonly referred to as Abilene Wylie. The mascot on the district's website is a yellow bulldog and is also the mascot for all the schools. In 2009, the school district was rated "recognized" by the Texas Education Agency.

== Geography ==
Wylie ISD serves parts of southern Abilene, the census-designated place of Potosi, the communities of Caps, Potosi, and View, as well as unincorporated areas in east central Taylor County. The district is bordered by Abilene ISD (north), Eula ISD (east, northeast), Clyde Consolidated ISD (southeast), Jim Ned Consolidated ISD (south), and Merkel ISD (west, northwest).

== Schools ==
=== Primary schools ===
==== Elementary schools (K-2) ====
- Wylie East Elementary
- Wylie South Elementary
- Wylie West Elementary

==== Intermediate schools (3-4) ====
- Wylie East Intermediate
- Wylie West Intermediate

=== Secondary schools ===
==== Junior high schools (5-8) ====
- Wylie East Junior High
- Wylie West Junior High

==== High schools (9-12) ====
- Wylie High School

=== Early childhood schools (Preschool) ===
- Wylie West Early Childhood

== History ==
The history of Wylie ISD dates back to the early 20th century. While records show that a Wylie school district was designated as early as 1888, it wasn't until 1902 that a school was organized. Mary V. Wylie, widow of pioneer J.J. Wylie, donated two acres of land for the construction of a new school. Three prominent citizens each contributed $120 for the purchase of materials and residents pooled their talents to erect a twenty-by-thirty foot building for use as both a school and a church.

In its first year (1902), the campus was a private school with an enrollment of 13 students. The school, then called District No. 11, became a public school in 1903. A post office opened in the community a year later under the name Sambo. The school's name was changed from District No. 11 to Sambo School. Due to an increasing student population, a new school was built in 1915 on land donated by Mrs. Wylie. She requested that the school's name be changed to Wylie in honor of her late husband, which was done. A series of bond elections was held during the 1920s. The first, in 1924, funded the construction of a new brick school that opened in 1925. The second bond election was held in 1927 that approved the construction of two additional classrooms and a dining room for the home economics department.

The 1930s saw a number of smaller school districts consolidate with Wylie. The Neill school district did so in 1931, followed by Iberis in 1933. That year, the district expanded from ten to eleven grades. In 1935, Buffalo Gap began sending its tenth and eleventh graders to Wylie, which continued until 1978 when Buffalo Gap consolidated with Jim Ned. Potosi began sending its eleventh grade students to Wylie in 1937 and Cedar Creek closed and began sending its students to Wylie as well. The Bulldog mascot and the colors purple and gold were officially adopted in 1942. Potosi, which had been sending its secondary school students to Wylie since the late 1930s, fully consolidated with the district in 1949.

A bond election passed in 1962 that called for the addition of two buildings and other improvements. By 1964, a total of 466 students were enrolled in the district. As Abilene grew and annexed land from Wylie into its school district, Wylie residents voted to become an independent school district in 1968. Butterfield School, located between the communities of Caps and View, consolidated with Wylie ISD in 1978. A bond election held that same year passed, which funded the construction of a new high school campus on Farm to Market Road 707 (Beltway South).

The district continued to grow and a new middle school (presently Wylie Intermediate School) opened in 1984. A year later, enrollment stood at 1,550. In 1986, an intermediate campus opened on Hardwick Road (present-day Wylie Elementary School). A larger high school campus on Antilley Road opened in 1994 and the previous high school was converted into the district's junior high school.

Wylie schools celebrated the district's 100th anniversary in 2002. At the end of the 2005-2006 school year, Butterfield School closed, reducing the number of schools from six to five. At the beginning of the 2013-2014 school year 5th and 6th grade classes were moved, from the Intermediate and Junior High respectively, to the newly constructed Middle School on Beltway South adjacent to the Junior High. Now, Wylie is expanding rapidly and building more campuses.

== Students by ethnicity ==
Diversity Score	0.44
# of American Indian Students	9 students
% American Indian Students	n/a
# of Asian Students	88 students
% Asian Students	2%
# of Hispanic Students	767 students
% Hispanic Students	18%
# of Black Students	147 students
% Black Students	3%
# of White Students	3,086 students
% White Students	73%
# of Hawaiian Students	6 students
% of Hawaiian Students	n/a
# of Two or more races Students	150 students
% of Two or more races Students	4%

== Students by grade ==
# of Students in Pre-Kindergarten:	176
# of Students in Kindergarten:	410
# of Students in 1st Grade:	337
# of Students in 2nd Grade:	371
# of Students in 3rd Grade:	358
# of Students in 4th Grade:	370
# of Students in 5th Grade:	355
# of Students in 6th Grade:	388
# of Students in 7th Grade:	366
# of Students in 8th Grade:	352
# of Students in 9th Grade:	376
# of Students in 10th Grade:	305
# of Students in 11th Grade:	309
# of Students in 12th Grade:	280
# of Ungraded Students:	-

== Education ==
Wylie ISD was ranked within the top 5% of all 1203 school districts in Texas (based on combined math and reading proficiency testing data) for the 2015-2016 school year. The school district's graduation rate of 99% has increased from 98% over five school years.

Definition of Terms 2016-2017 School Year Data	Wylie	State Average (TX)
Math Test Scores (% Proficient)	95%	78%
Reading / Language Arts Test Scores (% Proficient)	90%	72%
Graduation Rate	≥99%	89%
