= Hamby, Texas =

- Unincorporated community
- Location within the state of Texas Hamby, Texas (the United States)
- Coordinates: 32°31′04″N 99°37′50″W
- Country: United States
- State: Texas
- County: Taylor
- Time zone: UTC-6 (Central (CST))
  - Summer (DST): UTC-5 (CDT)
- GNIS feature ID: 1349275

Hamby is an unincorporated community in Taylor County, Texas, United States. It is located at the intersection of Texas State Highway 351, approximately five miles east of Abilene. The community is part of the Abilene Metropolitan Statistical Area.

== History ==
The community developed around the oil and cotton industries and was originally called Corners because of its proximity to neighboring counties (Taylor, Jones, Callahan and Shackelford). The community was renamed in 1902 for its first postmaster, Hamby Richardson.
