= Ovalo, Texas =

Ovalo
- Unincorporated community
- Location within the state of Texas Ovalo (the United States)
- Coordinates: 32°10′22″N 99°48′28″W
- Country: United States
- State: Texas
- County: Taylor
- Time zone: UTC−06:00 (Central (CST))
  - Summer (DST): UTC−05:00 (CDT)
- ZIP codes: 79541
- GNIS feature ID: 1343362

Ovalo is an unincorporated community in Taylor County, Texas, United States. Ovalo has a post office with the ZIP code 79541.

The community is part of the Abilene, Texas Metropolitan Statistical Area.

== Climate ==
The climate in this area is characterized by hot, humid summers and generally mild to cool winters. According to the Köppen climate classification system, Ovalo has a humid subtropical climate, Cfa on climate maps.
