= Eula High School =

Location
- 6040 FM 603; Clyde, Texas 79510-6610; United States; 32.341421°N 99.560582°W

Information
- School type: Public high school
- School district: Eula Independent School District
- Principal: Wayland Damron
- Teaching staff: 16.11 (FTE)
- Grades: 9-12
- Enrollment: 105 (2023–2024)
- Student to teacher ratio: 6.52
- Colors: Maroon & White
- Athletics conference: UIL Class A
- Mascot: Pirate
- Yearbook: Treasure Chest
- Website: Eula High School

Eula High School is a public high school located near unincorporated Eula, Texas (USA) and classified as a 1A school by the UIL. It is part of the Eula Independent School District located in western Callahan County. The high school is addressed to Clyde since there is not a post office in Eula and is often referred to locally as Clyde-Eula. For the 2024–2025 school year, the school was given an "A" by the Texas Education Agency.

== Athletics ==
The Eula Pirates compete in the following sports -

- Baseball
- Basketball
- Cross Country
- Golf
- Softball
- Tennis
- Track and Field

=== State titles ===
- Boys Basketball
  - 2011(1A/D1)
- Boys Cross Country
  - 2025(1A)
- Softball
  - 2006(1A)

==== State Finalists ====
- Girls Basketball
  - 2025(1A/D1), 2026(1A/D1)
