= Holland Medical High School =

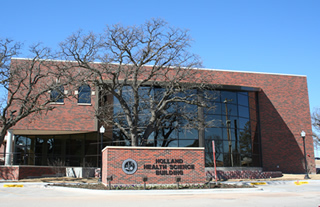

Location
- 2442 Cedar Street; Abilene, Texas 79601; United States; 32.478522°N 99.733332°W

Information
- Type: Public, Magnet
- Established: Fall 2008
- School district: Abilene Independent School District
- Grades: 10th - 12th
- Website: www.abileneisd.org/o/hhs

Holland Medical High School is a public health sciences magnet school within Abilene Independent School District (AISD) in Abilene, Texas. It is located at 2442 Cedar Street on the campus of Hardin-Simmons University (HSU) directly across the street from the Hendrick Medical Center. The school was proposed in 2005 to be the first "school of choice" within the school district, giving the districts growing Health Occupations programs space to grow and expand. This building was completed in conjunction with HSU in 2007 with its opening held on February 7, 2008.

The school is now named after David S. "Scotty" Holland, a former student at HSU and current Chairman of the Board for Trend Exploration I LLC oil company.
