= The House of Yahweh: My Side of the Story =

Book by Kay Hawkins

- First edition
- Author: Kay Hawkins
- Language: English
- Genre: Memoir
- Publication date: 2012

The House of Yahweh: My Side of the Story is a 2012 book by Kay Hawkins, ex-wife of Yisrayl Hawkins, founder of the House of Yahweh. The two were married 14 years and the book is based on her experiences with the sect, and more specifically, the man who founded it.

== Synopsis ==
Kay Hawkins was forced to leave the House of Yahweh when her then husband (and leader of the organization) excommunicated her. She waited 17 years before publishing her story, which the Abilene Reporter News describes as being less of a scathing tell all book, and more of a character study of Yisrayl himself. In her own words, she wanted to "tell everybody, one of these days, exactly what happened." The book describes the beginnings of the House of Yehweh, and the changes that took place in both Yisrayl Hawkins and the organization over time. She claims "The scriptures in the editions of the bible that he now publishes have been rewritten, cleverly twisted to fit his own personal doctrines."

The International Cultic Studies Association describes the book as a treasure trove of primary sources on the legal problems the sect has faced, and "contributes to our understanding of psychological patterns of cult leaders and the people who surround them."

== See also ==
- Governmental lists of cults and sects
