= Impact, Texas =

Town in Taylor County, Texas, United States

- Town
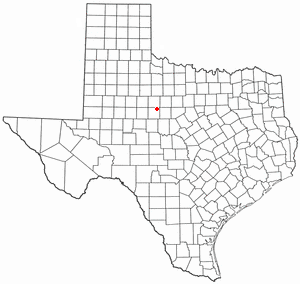
- Location of Impact, Texas

- Coordinates: 32°29′58″N 99°44′54″W
- Country: United States
- State: Texas
- County: Taylor

Area
  - Total: 0.089 sq mi (0.23 km^{2})
  - Land: 0.089 sq mi (0.23 km^{2})
  - Water: 0 sq mi (0.00 km^{2})
- Elevation: 1,667 ft (508 m)

Population (2020)
  - Total: 22
  - Density: 250/sq mi (96/km^{2})
- Time zone: UTC-6 (Central (CST))
  - Summer (DST): UTC-5 (CDT)
- ZIP code: 79603
- Area code: 325
- FIPS code: 48-35816
- GNIS feature ID: 2412789

Impact is a town in Taylor County, Texas, United States. The population was 22 as of the 2020 census, down from 35 at the 2010 census, making it the second least populated municipality in Texas. It is part of the Abilene metropolitan area and is an enclave of the city of Abilene.

== Geography ==
According to the United States Census Bureau, the town has a total area of 0.1 square miles (26 ha), all land.

== History ==
The area that became known as Impact began as a 20-acre (8 ha) poultry farm owned by advertising businessman Dallas Perkins. Prior to 1960, liquor sales were prohibited in all cities and counties surrounding Abilene. The prohibition of legal liquor sales encouraged bootleggers to produce illegal liquor commonly called "moonshine".

Perkins capitalized on the potential market for legal liquor among the wets by purchasing 27 acres of land adjacent to his farm on the outskirts of Abilene and then pushing for its incorporation. Calling the village "Impact" after his advertising business, 29 signatures of local residents were collected and it was incorporated in 1960.

Soon after, the village's citizens voted 18 to 2 to permit liquor sales. Abilene lawyers immediately filed motions to oppose the town's incorporation, but a Texas Supreme Court ruling in 1963 upheld Impact's incorporation and its right to sell liquor.

Two liquor stores opened in Impact in 1963. The first month's sales were $463,000 (equivalent to roughly $3.5 million in 2012). With the newfound revenues, the village's roads were paved and lighted, garbage pickup was introduced, and a policeman was hired. One of the liquor stores was Pinky's, which was owned by Perkins and his associates and used a logo of a pink elephant, thus the name.

Impact remained the only wholly wet municipality in Taylor County until 1978, when Abilene voters narrowly legalized (by a 131-vote margin) liquor sales in the city. With that vote, Impact lost its reason for being. The liquor stores in Impact soon dried up and closed and the community became just another suburb of Abilene.

Impact has been and still is one of the smallest incorporated communities in Texas. Its population peaked at 61 in 1970 and had declined to 39 by 2000.

== Demographics ==
=== 2020 census ===
Impact racial composition (NH = Non-Hispanic) (Note: Note: the US Census treats Hispanic/Latino as an ethnic category. This table excludes Latinos from the racial categories and assigns them to a separate category. Hispanics/Latinos can be of any race.)
Race	Number	Percentage
White (NH)	11	50.0%
Pacific Islander (NH)	1	4.55%
Mixed/Multi-Racial (NH)	2	9.09%
Hispanic or Latino	8	36.36%
Total	22	

As of the 2020 United States census, there were 22 people, 13 households, and 9 families residing in the town.

=== 2000 census ===
Historical population
Census	Pop.	Note	%±
1970	61		—
1980	54		−11.5%
1990	25		−53.7%
2000	39		56.0%
2010	35		−10.3%
2020	22		−37.1%
U.S. Decennial Census

As of the census of 2000, there were 39 people, 14 households, and 9 families residing in the town. The population density was 450.2 inhabitants per square mile (173.8/km^{2}). There were 16 housing units at an average density of 184.7 per square mile (71.3/km^{2}). The racial makeup of the town was 58.97% White, 7.69% African American, 30.77% from other races, and 2.56% from two or more races. Hispanic or Latino of any race were 64.10% of the population.

There were 14 households, out of which 35.7% had children under the age of 18 living with them, 42.9% were married couples living together, 21.4% had a female householder with no husband present, and 28.6% were non-families. 28.6% of all households were made up of individuals, and 21.4% had someone living alone who was 65 years of age or older. The average household size was 2.79 and the average family size was 3.30.

In the village the population was spread out, with 35.9% under the age of 18, 15.4% from 18 to 24, 15.4% from 25 to 44, 15.4% from 45 to 64, and 17.9% who were 65 years of age or older. The median age was 25 years. For every 100 females, there were 129.4 males. For every 100 females age 18 and over, there were 92.3 males.

The median income for a household in the village was $23,750, and the median income for a family was $23,750. Males had a median income of $31,250 versus $18,125 for females. The per capita income was $12,488. There were 30.0% of families and 36.4% of the population living below the poverty line, including 28.6% of under eighteens and 20.0% of those over 64.

== Education ==
The Town of Impact is served by the Abilene Independent School District.

Impact is zoned to: Stafford Elementary School, Mann Middle School, and Abilene High School.

== See also ==
- List of municipalities in Texas
