= House of Yahweh =

Religious group based in Texas, United States

Coordinates: 32.3817°N 99.5373°W

- Type: New religious movement
- Scripture: Bible
- Region: United States
- Headquarters: Eula, Texas
- Founder: Yisrayl Hawkins
- Origin: 1980

The House of Yahweh (HOY) is a religious group based in Eula, Texas. The assembly has been controversial and is referred to as a cult by former members.

== Founder ==
Yisrayl Hawkins (also known as "Buffalo Bill" Hawkins) is HOY's founder. In 1974, his brother, J. G. (Yaaqob) Hawkins, returned from a seven-year visit to Israel claiming he had "found proof of Yahweh's name". Shortly after, he formed the "first House of Yahweh" in Odessa, Texas. He preached distinct doctrines that his brother agreed with, such as the necessity of referring to the Creator as Yahweh and the Messiah as Yahshua, as well as following the Torah and the Jewish festivals.

In 1980, Hawkins legally changed his first name to Yisrayl, and began The House of Yahweh Abilene at his home. Hawkins says he and his brother were prophesied in both the Old and New Testaments as the two witnesses, sent by Yahweh to prepare the world for the Second Coming of Yahshua the Messiah.

Hawkins has written numerous books concerning Yahweh's laws and prophecies. Some are The Mark of the Beast Vol. 1 & 2, The Lost Faith of the Apostles and Prophets, Deceptions Concerning Yahweh's Calendar Of Events, Devil Worship: The Shocking Facts!, Unveiling Satan!, The End, In Search of a Savior, There Is Someone Out There, The Two Witnesses, and The Peaceful Solution. Hawkins was the primary editor of The Book of Yahweh: The Holy Scriptures, now in its 10th edition, which is, according to the House of Yahweh "the most correct and accurate translation of the Holy Scriptures that is available today." With its use of the name Yahweh throughout the New Testament, it fits into the category of sacred name Bibles.

Hawkins died on 8 October 2021.

== Beliefs ==
The House of Yahweh believes that it is the oldest and only true faith, as instituted by Yahweh, according to the Bible. Many of the groups teachings are similar to those of Herbert W. Armstrong and the Sabbatarian Churches of God.

Similar to Armstrongism, the HOY believes the world will soon experience the Great Tribulation and that the Bible refers to Satan as the god of this world, and that "she" has the entire world deceived.

HOY believes Yahweh is the name of the creator of the world, and that Yahshua is the name of the Son of Yahweh, and that he is their messiah. They teach that any other titles—such as God (El, Elohim), Lord (Ba'al, Adonai), Jehovah, Jesus and Christ—are names or titles of pagan beings or idols, or are mistakes, that have been falsely ascribed to Yahweh.

Its practices draw from Judaism, as the assembly follows the Torah, the 613 laws and rules found in the Pentateuch. They believe the observance of these laws promotes peace and love, and is an answer to many problems in the world. Members adhere to a kosher diet, strictly following the dietary laws in Leviticus 11, and wear garments similar to the Jewish yarmulke (kippah) and tallit in worship services and private prayer. Members regularly perform ritual ablutions, and are baptized when they join the assembly.

HOY instructs its members to tithe 10% of all their increases as said in the Bible.

=== Feasts ===
Like Judaism and Armstrongism, HOY keeps the seventh-day Sabbath and the annual feasts of the Old Testament, including Passover, the Feast of Unleavened Bread, Pentecost, The Feast of Trumpets, and The Feast of Tabernacles, as well as the fast-day called The Day of Atonement.

Once a year on the evening before Passover, members hold a solemn observance they call "Yahshua's Memorial" in memory of the crucifixion of Jesus. The assembly shares unleavened bread and wine as symbols of the body and blood of Yahshua, and members wash one another's feet. The following evening, the assembly celebrates Passover.

Christmas, Easter and birthdays are not celebrated, as they believe they are pagan rituals and customs in observance of other gods. Unlike Judaism and Armstrongism, HOY believes The House of Yahweh Sanctuary in Eula, Texas is the only place on earth where celebratory feasts are to be observed, and three times a year they make a pilgrimage to Abilene to celebrate Passover, Pentecost, and Tabernacles.

=== Rejection of Trinitarianism ===
Unlike Trinitarian Christianity, the House of Yahweh teaches that Yahshua (Jesus) was born a man, and became the son of Yahweh, "the firstborn among many brothers", when he was baptized by John the Baptist. They believe that he was framed for insurrection, received an illegal trial, and was then flogged, tormented, nailed to a pole (not a cross) and executed by the civil authorities. Similar to Christianity, they teach that he died for the sins of man as an atonement offering or blood sacrifice, and in so doing he became a Passover Lamb. The House of Yahweh teaches that he was buried at sunset, and three days later, he was resurrected from the dead, subsequently ascending into Heaven 40 days later. They believe that he is waiting until the prophesied end time to return to Earth, establishing Yahweh's Kingdom on Earth and preventing humankind from ultimately destroying themselves.

=== Yahweh's exclusivity ===
According to the assembly, Yahweh is the only one who deserves worship or adoration, and is the sovereign and only creator and ruler of the universe. Yahshua (Jesus) is not believed to be a divine being, and is not thought to preexist before his conception. They believe that the Holy Spirit in the original scriptures is "The every word of Yahweh, the Law and the Prophets".

Unlike either Judaism or Christianity, and similarly to Armstrongism, they make no distinction between the Old Testament and the New Testament, claiming the New Testament is a continuation of the Old Testament, reaffirming and reestablishing it. In addition, the House of Yahweh rejects religious customs that conflict with their interpretation of the Torah.

In an attempt to purify their religion of pagan elements, all pagan names, words, and concepts are eschewed. They also publish an edition of the Bible (The Book of Yahweh), which removes any and all words or concepts which they believe are pagan corruptions, including removal of God/Elohim in favor of Yahweh, as well as changing names to remove these influences (e.g. Yliyah for Elijah, Yechetzqyah for Ezekiel, Riyyah for Ruth, and Yahchanan for John).

== Failed "end times" predictions ==
- 1999–In a Channel 4 documentary entitled Welcome to Armageddon, Hawkins stated: "Four fifths of the world's population is going to be wiped out between now and about the middle of the year 2002. Mark it on your calendar. Four fifths of the world's population." When the interviewer asked: "What if what you're saying doesn't happen?", Hawkins replied: "There is no possibility that it could not take place just as I have told you."
- September 12, 2006–Hawkins announced in the House of Yahweh newsletter (February 2006) that a nuclear war would begin on September 12, 2006. He claimed that it was a part of HOY's commission to warn the nations and the people of the world. Hawkins was interviewed on the Channel 4 web show "thisisaknife" about his apocalyptic predictions. Among other things, he claimed that Abilene, Texas, would be saved from the impending destruction, and invited the show's presenter to join him there so he would be safe.

Kenyan followers of the House of Yahweh believe that the end of the world began on or before September 12, 2006, and that members of the House Of Yahweh would have survived the coming nuclear catastrophe. The specific prophecy appeared on the front page of HOY's website prior to the date. It is also addressed in the publication The End by Yisrayl Hawkins. That same year, the leaders of the sect in Kenya were arrested, and subsequently released on bail after giving assurances that they would refrain from inciting fear in the local population. Following the predicted doomsday date predicted by the Kenyan sect, leaders of the group have reportedly fled Kenya.

- June 12, 2007–Hawkins amended his prediction to state that a nuclear war was only conceived on September 12, 2006, and that it would follow the natural birth cycle of a woman, finally being "born" nine months later on June 12, 2007. On May 7, 2007, a new counter was put up on his website, counting down to the June 12 birth date of the "Nuclear Baby". Whether the entire nuclear event was to take place on that date, or in the months leading up to it as well, was never made clear. He also stated that by October 13, 2007, four-fifths or 80% of the human race would be dead from nuclear war.
- June 12, 2008–Hawkins stated that nuclear war would begin on June 12, 2008. Since the passing of this date without incident, Hawkins has yet to predict another date for a nuclear war.
- December 24, 2016–The group claimed that nuclear destruction would occur before Christmas 2016, so members attended and watched, but nothing happened.
- In the book Birth Of the Nuclear Baby: The Explosion Of Sin, the group claims that nuclear war did start on September 12, 2006, but that it did not start with bombs dropping.

== Legal issues ==
In October 2006, a former HOY member pleaded guilty to injury to a child by criminal negligence for performing surgery on her seven-year-old daughter, which led to her death, according to authorities.

On October 16, 2007, Yedidiyah Hawkins, an Elder at HOY, was arrested for sexual assault of his fourteen-year-old stepdaughter. During a forensic interview at the Abilene Police Department's Child Advocacy Center, the child disclosed that the abuse began when she was eight. Documents released by the Callahan County District Attorney's Office following the arrest allege that Hawkins was preparing to marry the unnamed stepdaughter, although the group says that was not true. He was subsequently indicted by a Callahan County, Texas Grand Jury on December 12, 2007. On October 27, 2008, a jury for the 42nd District Court found him guilty of aggravated sexual assault of a child. The judge sentenced him to 30 years in prison. A motion for a new trial was rejected by a 42nd District Court judge on February 18, 2009. Several other charges are pending until all appeals have been exhausted. On July 29, 2010, the Eleventh Court of Appeals in the State of Texas affirmed his conviction.

On February 12, 2008, Yisrayl Hawkins was arrested and then moved to the Taylor County Jail on four counts of bigamy. His bail was set at $10 million, later reduced to $100,000. On October 29, 2009, bigamy charges against him were dismissed after he, following what he believes is the example of the Savior, pleaded no contest to child labor charges. Hawkins was given a fine and probation.

== See also ==
- The House of Yahweh: My Side of the Story
- List of groups referred to as cults or sects in government documents
- Sacred Name Movement
