= Jack Favor =

American rodeo performer (1911–1988)

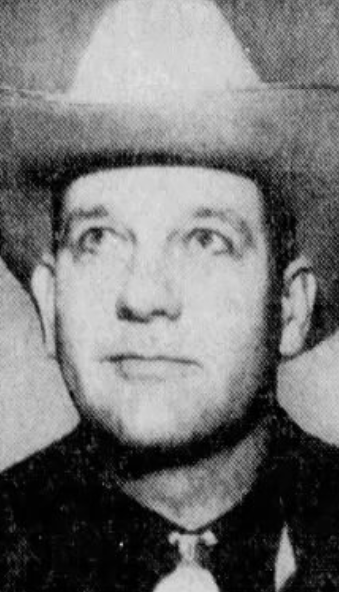
- Favor in 1965
- Born: Jack Graves Favor; November 30, 1911; Eula, Texas, U.S.
- Died: December 27, 1988 (aged 77); Arlington, Texas, U.S.
- Occupation: Rodeo performer
- Spouse: Ponder Favor (m. 1940)
- Children: 3

Jack Graves Favor (November 30, 1911 – December 27, 1988), also known as Cadillac Jack Favor, was an American rodeo performer.

== Early and later life ==
Favor was born on a ranch in Eula, Texas, the son of Robert and Georgia Favor. He attended and graduated from Abilene High School. While at high school he won his first rodeo competition as a bronc rider in Cameron, Texas.

Favor served in the United States Navy from 1929 to 1932, returning to Texas after his discharge. He worked as a truck driver for a plumbing company in Abilene, Texas. He later settled in Fort Worth, Texas, before returning to the Navy in 1941.

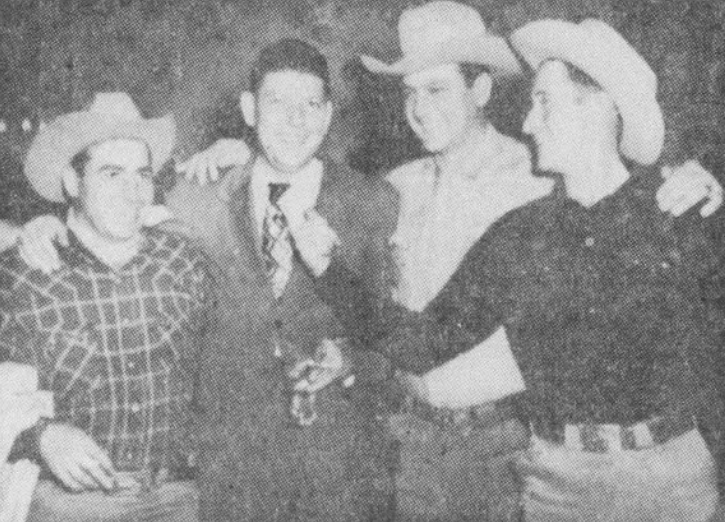
Favor (third in the center) with Bill McGuire, Foster Tussy and George Mills, 1947

Favor continued to compete in rodeos, retiring in 1961 to live in Texarkana, Texas, working as a salesman.

== Conviction, imprisonment and acquittal ==
In 1967, Favor was convicted of a double murder after being accused by a hitchhiker he had picked up back in 1964. He was represented by Louisiana state senator Joe T. Cawthorn in his court trial, but was found guilty and served eight years of a life sentence at Angola State Penitentiary before being acquitted in a retrial. During his prison sentence, he competed in prison rodeos.

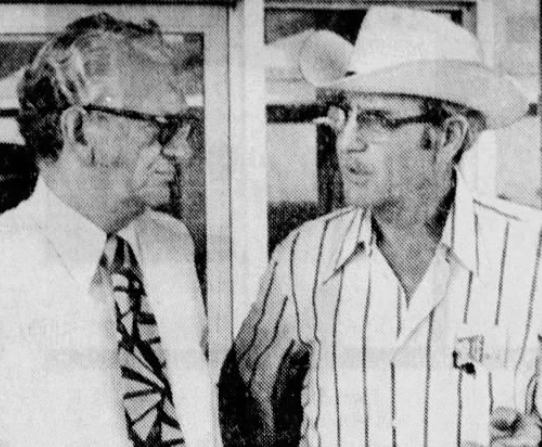
Favor (right) with Warren Henderson, 1974

After his release, Favor settled in Arlington, Texas and sued for wrongful conviction and imprisonment, settling for $55,000. He was the subject of a book written by William B. Moody, titled In Jack’s Favor, and appeared in the NBC late-night television talk show The Tomorrow Show, and a radio show hosted by sports journalist Howard Cosell.

== Death and legacy ==
Favor died on December 27, 1988, from complications of cancer in a hospital in Arlington, Texas, at the age of 77. He was buried at Parkdale Cemetery.

In 1998, Favor was played by actor and musician Clint Black in the television film Still Holding On: The Legend of Cadillac Jack. Black also co-wrote the song "Cadillac Jack" with country songwriter Hayden Nicholas.

In 2009, Favor was posthumously inducted into the Texas Trail of Fame.
