= Abilene State Park =

State park in Texas, United States

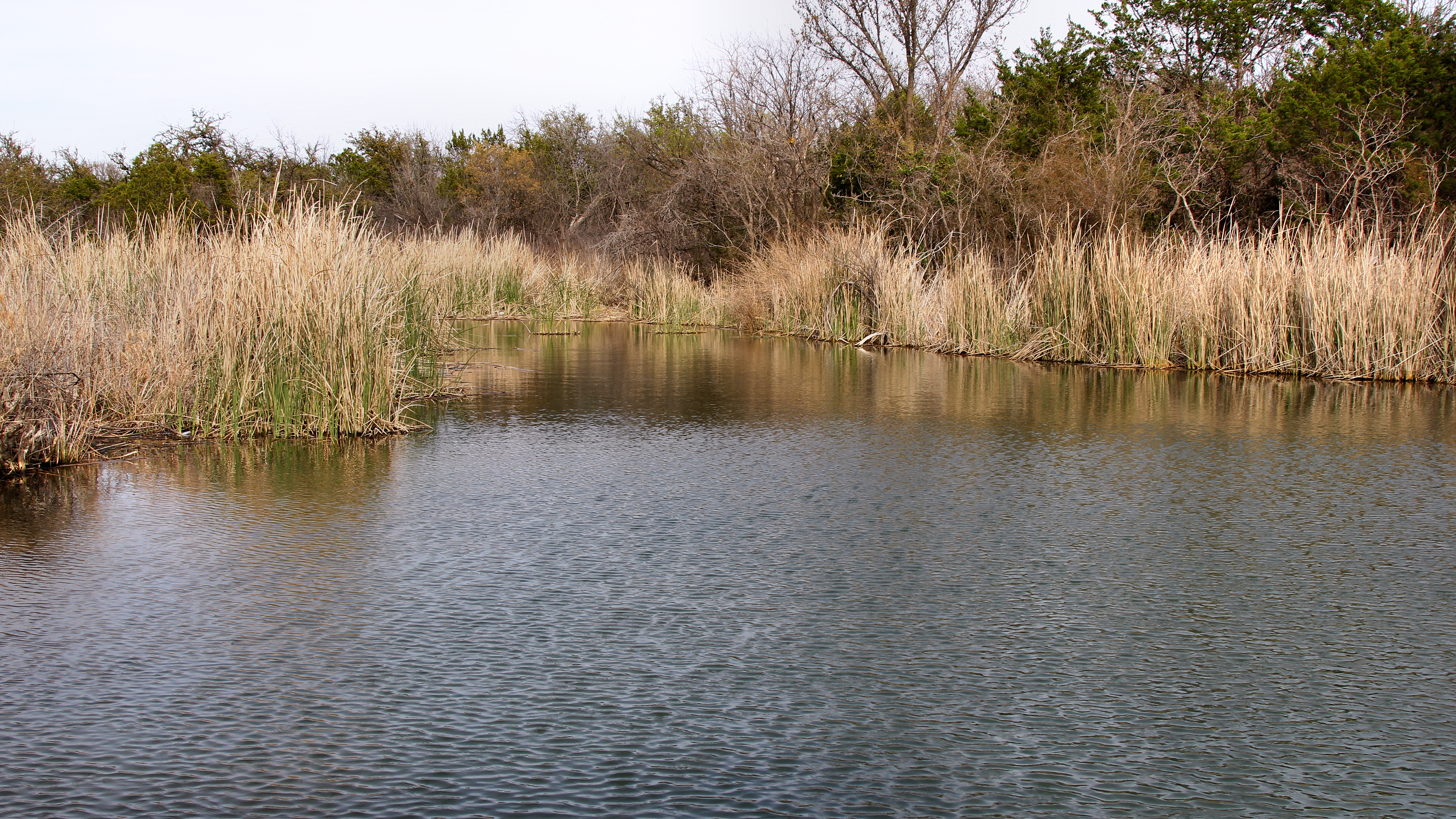
- Buffalo Wallow in Abilene State Park

- Location within Texas Location within the United States
- Location: Taylor County, Texas, U.S.
- Nearest city: Abilene
- Coordinates: 32°14′26.63″N 99°52′44.9″W
- Area: 529.4 acres (214.2 ha)
- Established: 1933
- Named for: Ray Roberts
- Visitors: 73,835 (in 2025)
- Governing body: Texas Parks and Wildlife Department
- Website: Official site

Abilene State Park is a 529.4-acre (214.2 ha) state park next to Lake Abilene in Taylor County, Texas, United States. The park opened on May 10, 1934, and is managed by the Texas Parks and Wildlife Department.

== History ==
The presence of humans in Abilene State Park dates back at least 6,000 years. The Tonkawa and Comanche passed through the park while hunting bison and also camped there. Settlers who had come to the region in the late 1870s occupied the land next. They farmed the bottomlands and raised sheep and cattle on the uplands. Many of the settlers were displaced when the City of Abilene built a dam on Elm Creek in 1918 that created Lake Abilene. The lake's purpose was to ensure a reliable water supply for the growing town, but the lake proved ineffective, even going dry in 1927. The City of Abilene found another water source in the late 1920s. The lake is now used purely for recreation.

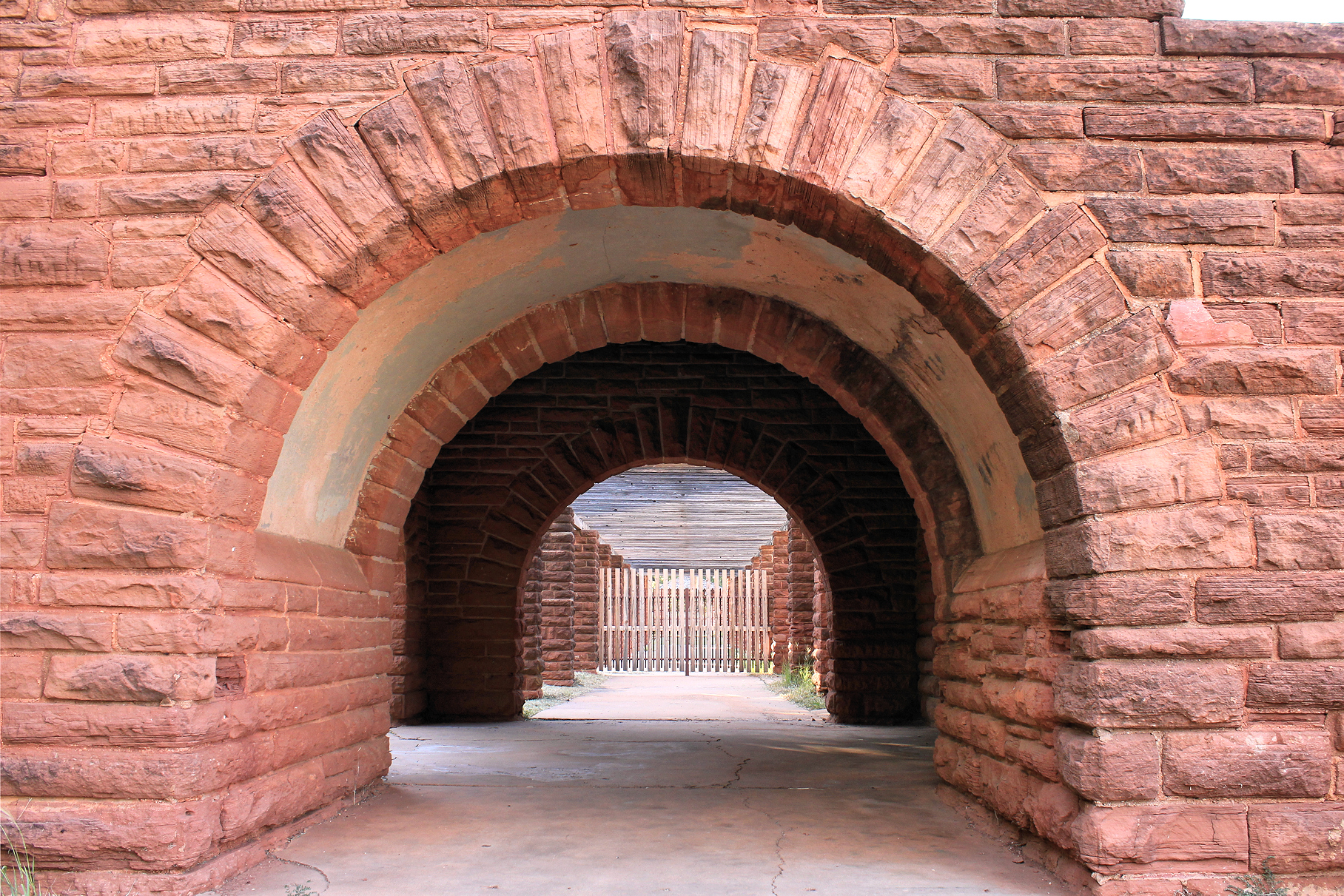
Detail of the rock work on the CCC built concession building.

The state acquired the property from the city of Abilene in 1933. Early development of the park was done by Civilian Conservation Corps (CCC) companies 1823(V) and 1823(CV) between 1933 and 1935. They cleared land and built roads. The CCC constructed a swimming pool, pool shelters, pergolas, stone water tower, stone pump house, water fountains, stone seats, picnic tables and fireplaces. They also built the park concession stand using local limestone and red Permian sandstone.

== Nature ==
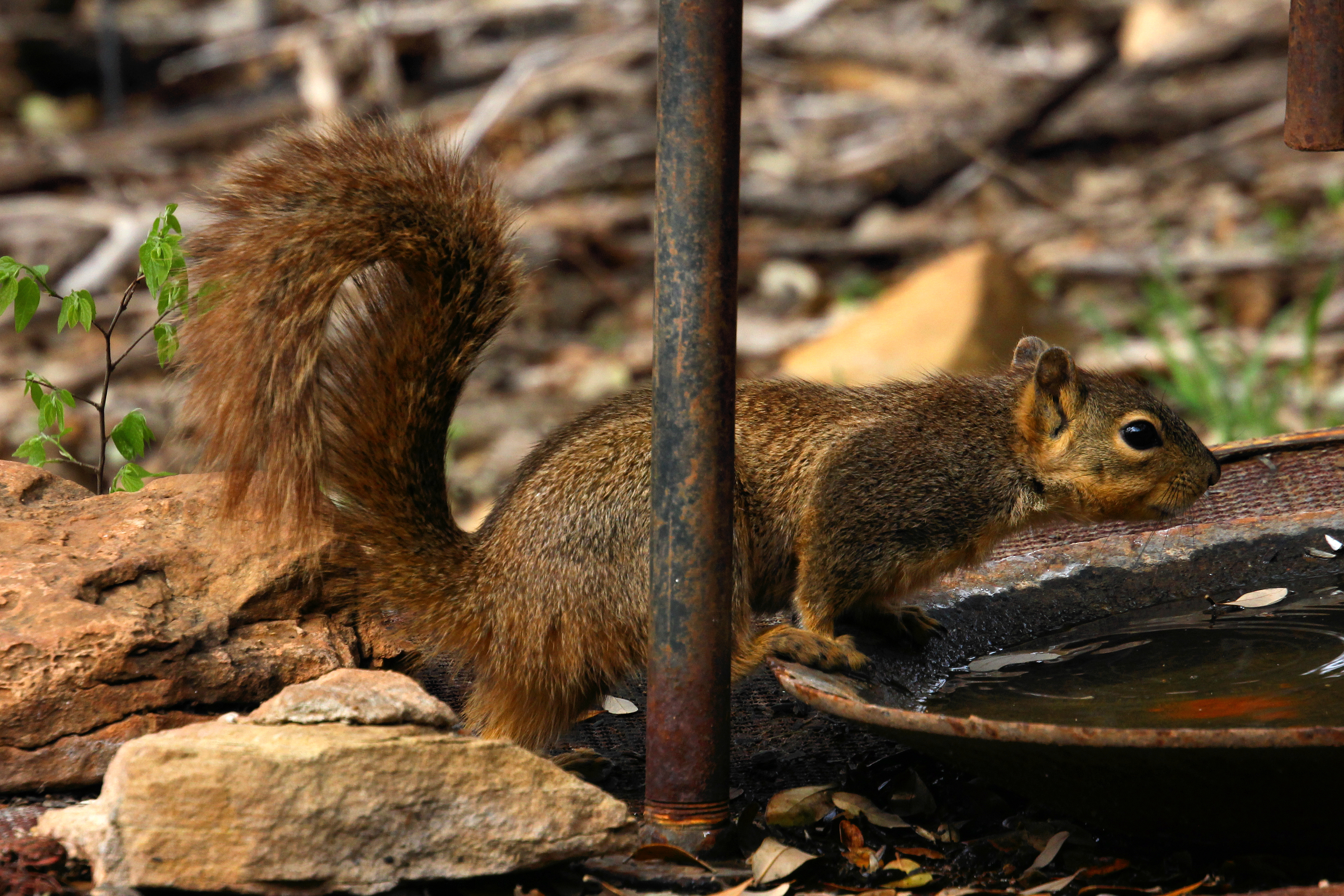
An eastern fox squirrel gets a drink at the bird blind.

Abilene State Park is located along elm creek in an area where the Rolling Plains and Edwards Plateau ecoregions of Texas meet. The landscape is short prairie grass, brushland and wooded stream valleys in a range of hills called the Callahan Divide.

=== Animals ===
White-tailed deer, wild boar, common raccoon, Mexican long-nosed armadillo, eastern fox squirrel and eastern cottontail are frequently seen in the park. Gray fox and striped skunk live in the park but are more elusive.

Birds that live in or visit the park, include the Mississippi kite, greater roadrunner, northern cardinal, turkey vulture, ruby-throated hummingbird, black-chinned hummingbird, Carolina chickadee and northern mockingbird. Largemouth bass, channel catfish, crappie, perch and rainbow trout (stocked seasonally) are caught in Buffalo Wallow, a pond in the park.

=== Plants ===
Common trees are southern live oak, Buckley's oak, eastern red cedar, ashe juniper, honey mesquite, pecan and netleaf hackberry. Prickly pear cactus grows throughout the park. Some of the many grasses include sideoats grama and little bluestem.

== Facilities and activities ==
Abilene State Park features camping sites for recreational vehicles and tents, picnic shelters, a swimming pool, a bird blind, playground and hiking trails. There is a volleyball court and fields for soccer and baseball. The park is on Lake Abilene which offers opportunities for fishing, kayaking, canoeing and boating.

== See also ==
- List of Texas state parks
