= Merkel Independent School District =

School district in Texas

Location
- 302 Ash St. Merkel, Texas ESC Region 14 USA

District information
- Type: Independent school district
- Grades: Pre-K through 12
- Superintendent: Joseph O'Malley
- Schools: 3
- NCES District ID: 221904

Students and staff
- Athletic conference: UIL Class 3A Football Division II
- District mascot: Badgers
- Colors: Purple, Gold

Other information
- Website: Merkel ISD

Merkel Independent School District is a public school district based in Merkel, Texas, USA. The district covers portions of two counties, Taylor and Jones.

In addition to Merkel, the district also serves the city of Tye. Their mascot is the Badger. Their UIL conference affiliation is 3A.

The district changed to a four-day school week in fall 2022.

== Schools ==
- Merkel High School(grades 9–12)
- Merkel Junior High (grades 7–8)
- Merkel Elementary (prekindergarten-grade 6)
