= Abilene Independent School District =

School district in Texas

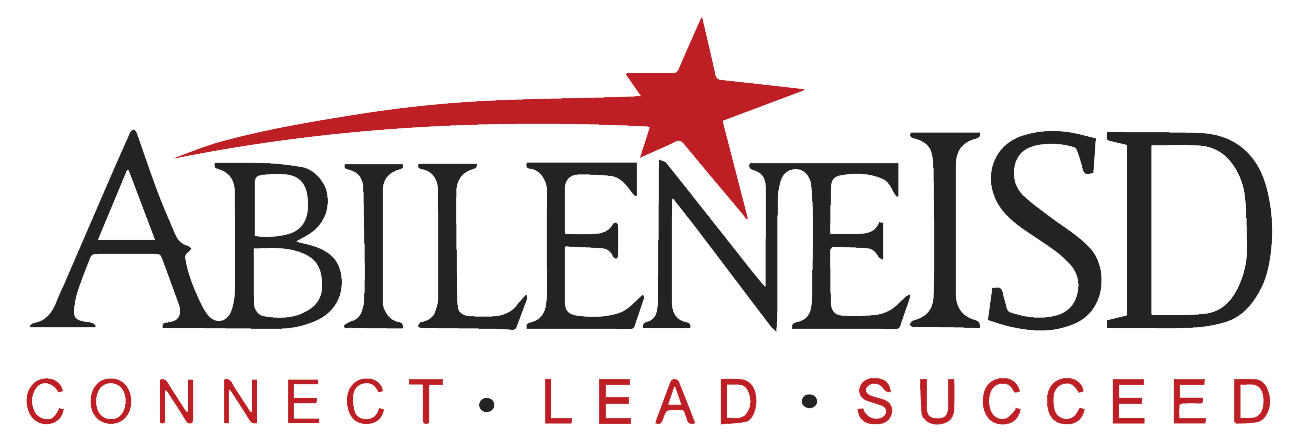

Location
- 241 Pine; Abilene, Texas ESC Region 14 USA
- Coordinates: 32°27′3″N 99°43′57″W

District information
- Type: Independent school district
- Grades: Pre-K through 12
- Superintendent: Dr. John Kuhn
- Schools: 26 (2015-16)
- NCES District ID: 4807440

Students and staff
- Students: 17,161 (2010-11)
- Teachers: 1,215.02 (2009-10) (on full-time equivalent (FTE) basis)
- Student–teacher ratio: 14.00 (2009-10)

Other information
- TEA District Accountability Rating for 2011-12: Academically Acceptable
- Website: Abilene ISD

Abilene Independent School District is a public school district based in Abilene, Texas (USA).

The district serves the cities of Abilene and Impact in northeastern Taylor County, as well as most of the portion of Abilene that lies in southeastern Jones County. As of the 2009-10 school year, AISD enrolled 17,016 students in 2 High Schools, 2 Magnet High Schools, 4 Middle Schools, 15 Elementary Schools and numerous special and alternative campuses. The district's enrollment peaked, for the time being, in the late 1990s and early part of the new century as development in south Abilene began to sprawl ever outward, spilling into neighboring Wylie ISD and Jim Ned CISD. As the city continues to age, school enrollment seems to have stabilized, for now, around 17,000.

== Finances ==
As of the 2010-2011 school year, the appraised valuation of property in the district was $3,810,069,000. The maintenance tax rate was $0.104 and the bond tax rate was $0.012 per $100 of appraised valuation.

== Academic achievement ==
In 2011, the school district was rated "academically acceptable" by the Texas Education Agency. Forty-nine percent of districts in Texas in 2011 received the same rating. No state accountability ratings were given to districts in 2012. A school district in Texas can receive one of four possible rankings from the Texas Education Agency: Exemplary (the highest possible ranking), Recognized, Academically Acceptable, and Academically Unacceptable (the lowest possible ranking).

Historical district TEA accountability ratings

- 2011: Academically Acceptable
- 2010: Academically Unacceptable
- 2009: Academically Acceptable
- 2008: Academically Acceptable
- 2007: Academically Acceptable
- 2006: Academically Acceptable
- 2005: Academically Acceptable
- 2004: Academically Acceptable

== Schools ==
=== High Schools (Grades 9-12) ===
- Abilene High School (Eagles) Opened 1888, current building Opened 1950s
  - 2009 Gold Performance award - College Readiness: English & Language Arts
- Cooper High School (Cougars) Opened 1961
- Holland Medical High School Opened 2007 located on the Hardin-Simmons University campus
- Academy of Technology, Engineering, Math and Science (ATEMS) Opened 2009

=== Middle Schools (Grades 6-8) ===
- Clack Middle School (Cardinals) Opened 1992
  - Feeds into Cooper High
  - 2009 Recognized Campus
  - 2009 Gold Performance awards - Reading, Social Studies
- Madison Middle School (Bison) Opened 1961
  - Feeds into Cooper High
  - 2009 Recognized Campus
  - 2009 Gold Performance awards - Reading, Writing, Social Studies
- Mann Middle School (Falcons) Opened 1961
  - Feeds into Abilene High
  - 2009 Gold Performance award - Social Studies
- Craig Middle School (Colts) Opened 2007
  - Feeds into Abilene High
  - 2009 Recognized Campus
  - 2009 Gold Performance awards - Reading, Writing, Social Studies

==== Former Middle Schools ====
- Franklin Middle School (Broncos) [absorbed into Mann & Craig Middle School in 2007]
- Lincoln Middle School (Longhorns) [consolidated into Craig Middle School in 2007]
- Jefferson Middle School (Coyotes) [absorbed into Madison & Clack Middle Schools in 2004]

=== Elementary Schools (Grades K-5) ===
- Alcorta Elementary School (Buffaloes) Opened 1962
  - Feeds into Madison MS
  - Formerly Jackson Elementary School (1962-2021)
  - 2025 Employee Awards - New Teacher
- Austin Elementary School (Raiders) Opened 1959
  - Feeds into Mann MS & Madison MS
  - 2009 Exemplary School
  - 2009 Gold Performance awards - Reading, Math, Writing, Science
- Bassetti Elementary School (Golden Bears) Opened 1992
  - Feeds into Clack MS
  - 2006 National Blue Ribbon School
  - 2009 Recognized Campus
  - 2009 Gold Performance awards - Reading, Math, Science
- Bonham Elementary School (Bulldogs) Opened 1953
  - Feeds into Craig MS & Clack MS
  - 2009 Recognized Campus
  - 2009 Gold Performance awards - Math, Writing, Science
- Bowie Elementary School (Bobcats) Opened 1951
  - Feeds into Madison MS
  - 2009 Exemplary Campus
  - 2009 Gold Performance awards - Reading, Math, Writing, Science
- Dyess Elementary School (Jets) Opened 1957
  - Feeds into Clack MS
  - 2009 Exemplary Campus
  - 2009 Gold Performance awards - Reading, Math, Writing, Science
- Martinez Elementary School
- Ortiz Elementary School (All-Stars) Opened 1992
  - Feeds into Mann MS
  - 2009 Recognized Campus
  - 2009 Gold Performance awards - Math, Writing
- Purcell Elementary School (Jaguars) Opened 1957
  - Feeds into Mann MS
  - Formerly Johnston Elementary (1957-2021)
- Stafford Elementary School (Lions) Opened 1961
  - Feeds into Mann MS & Madison MS
  - Formerly Lee Elementary School (1961-2021)
- Taylor Elementary School (Trojans)
  - Feeds into Craig MS
  - 2009 Exemplary Campus
  - 2009 Gold Performance awards - Writing, Science
- Thomas Elementary School (Texans) Opened 1992
  - Feeds into Craig MS & Madison MS
  - 2009 Exemplary Campus
  - 2009 Gold Performance award - Science
- Ward Elementary School (Wildcats) Opened 1992
  - Feeds into Clack MS & Madison MS
  - 2009 Exemplary Campus
  - 2009 Gold Performance awards - Reading, Math, Writing, Science
- 5th Grade McMagnet Program (McMurry University)

==== Former Elementary Schools ====
- Central Elementary School [closed 1976] Lamar Elementary School [closed 1966]
- Milam Elementary School [closed 1980]
- Fair Park Elementary School [closed 1984]
- Travis Elementary School [closed 1984]
- Crockett Elementary School [closed 2002]
- Jones Elementary School [closed 2002]
- Valley View Elementary School [closed 2003]
- Alta Vista Elementary School [closed 2003]
- Fannin Elementary School [closed 2012]
- College Heights Elementary School [closed 2012]
- Long Elementary School [closed 2016]
- Reagan Elementary School [closed 2021]
- Taylor Elementary School [closed 2023]

=== Early Childhood Schools (Pre-Kindergarten) ===
- Crockett Early Childhood
- Long Early Childhood

Former Childhood Schools (Pre-Kindergarten)

- Locust Early Childhood
- Woodson Early Childhood
- Woodson Early Headstart

=== Alternative Schools ===
- Woodson Center for Excellence

== See also ==
- List of school districts in Texas
- List of high schools in Texas
- Susan King, former AISD trustee and current member of the Texas House of Representatives from District 71 in Abilene
