= View, Texas =

- Unincorporated community
- Location within the state of Texas View, Texas (the United States)
- Coordinates: 32°20′24″N 99°53′05″W
- Country: United States
- State: Texas
- County: Taylor
- Time zone: UTC-6 (Central (CST))
  - Summer (DST): UTC-5 (CDT)
- GNIS feature ID: 1349275

View is an unincorporated community in Taylor County, Texas, United States. It is located at the intersection of U.S. Highway 277 and FM 1235, approximately thirteen miles southwest of Abilene. The community is part of the Abilene Metropolitan Statistical Area.

== History ==
View came into existence through the speculating activities of the Sweetwater-based Western Development Company, led by attorney Royston Campbell Crane, Sr. It was only when the Coleman Cutoff of the Atchison, Topeka, and Santa Fe Railroad system came through Taylor County, bypassing Abilene, that the area started to develop.

Originally called Caps Sides, the community became a registered town site on August 2, 1910. It was renamed View due to its location on a hill overlooking attractive farmland below. By 1914, View has an estimated population of forty.

In 1935, a joint school called Butterfield was constructed between View and the neighboring community of Caps. The school consolidated with the Wylie Independent School District in 1978 and remained operational until its closure at the end of the 2005–2006 school year.

Over the years, View has remained a small community. In 1988, the population was approximately 71 and had increased to 75 by 1990. That figure remained the same in 2000.
