= Tye, Texas =

- City
- Flag Seal
- Motto: Where It All Comes Together!
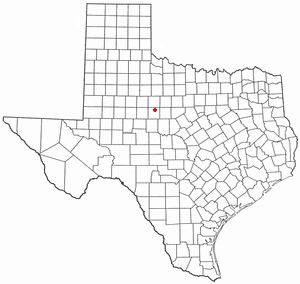
- Location of Tye, Texas

- Coordinates: 32°26′59″N 99°52′20″W
- Country: United States
- State: Texas
- County: Taylor

Area
  - Total: 4.80 sq mi (12.43 km^{2})
  - Land: 4.80 sq mi (12.43 km^{2})
  - Water: 0 sq mi (0.00 km^{2})
- Elevation: 1,811 ft (552 m)

Population (2020)
  - Total: 1,176
  - Density: 245.0/sq mi (94.61/km^{2})
- Time zone: UTC-6 (Central (CST))
  - Summer (DST): UTC-5 (CDT)
- ZIP code: 79563
- Area code: 325
- FIPS code: 48-74132
- GNIS feature ID: 2412121
- Website: www.cityoftye.org

Tye is a city in Taylor County, Texas, United States. Its population was 1,176 at the 2020 census. It is part of the Abilene, Texas metropolitan statistical area.

== City history ==
Circa 1900, the T & P Railroad held a contest to select a name for one of the communities along its route. The town name chosen was Tye, in honor of John P. Tye, a Methodist minister who happened to be the first postmaster of the town. Before 1900, the town name had been Tebo.

== Geography ==
According to the United States Census Bureau, the city has a total area of 4.7 square miles (12.1 km^{2}), all land.

=== Climate ===
The climate in this area is characterized by hot, humid summers and generally mild to cool winters. According to the Köppen climate classification, Tye has a humid subtropical climate, Cfa on climate maps.

== Demographics ==
Historical population
Census	Pop.	Note	%±
1960	521		—
1970	857		64.5%
1980	1,394		62.7%
1990	1,088		−22.0%
2000	1,158		6.4%
2010	1,242		7.3%
2020	1,176		−5.3%
U.S. Decennial Census

=== 2020 census ===
As of the 2020 census, there were 1,176 people, 459 households, and 319 families residing in the city. The median age was 40.7 years; 23.5% of residents were under the age of 18 and 18.5% were 65 years of age or older. For every 100 females there were 103.5 males, and for every 100 females age 18 and over there were 101.8 males age 18 and over.

There were 459 households in Tye, of which 32.7% had children under the age of 18 living in them. Of all households, 47.5% were married-couple households, 21.6% were households with a male householder and no spouse or partner present, and 23.5% were households with a female householder and no spouse or partner present. About 23.5% of all households were made up of individuals and 12.0% had someone living alone who was 65 years of age or older.

There were 543 housing units, of which 15.5% were vacant. The homeowner vacancy rate was 0.9% and the rental vacancy rate was 12.8%.

0.0% of residents lived in urban areas, while 100.0% lived in rural areas.

Racial composition as of the 2020 census
Race	Number	Percent
White	931	79.2%
Black or African American	34	2.9%
American Indian and Alaska Native	9	0.8%
Asian	6	0.5%
Native Hawaiian and Other Pacific Islander	0	0.0%
Some other race	80	6.8%
Two or more races	116	9.9%
Hispanic or Latino (of any race)	274	23.3%

=== 2000 census ===
As of the census of 2000, 1,158 people, 426 households, and 316 families resided in the city. The population density was 248.3 inhabitants per square mile (95.9/km^{2}). The 582 housing units had an average density of 124.8 per square mile (48.2/km^{2}). The racial makeup of the city was 90.67% White, 1.81% African American, 0.60% Native American, 0.69% Asian, 5.27% from other races, and 0.95% from two or more races. Hispanics or Latinos of any race were 11.40% of the population.

Of the 426 households, 38.3% had children under 18 living with them, 56.3% were married couples living together, 13.4% had a female householder with no husband present, and 25.8% were not families. About 21.8% of all households were made up of individuals, and 7.7% had someone living alone who was 65 or older. The average household size was 2.72 and the average family size was 3.17.

In the city, the age distribution was 30.7% under 18, 8.9% from 18 to 24, 28.8% from 25 to 44, 22.4% from 45 to 64, and 9.2% who were 65 or older. The median age was 33 years. For every 100 females, there were 91.1 males. For every 100 females 18 and over, there were 88.1 males.

The median income for a household in the city was $25,568, and for a family was $31,719. Males had a median income of $25,263 versus $19,000 for females. The per capita income for the city was $11,508. About 23.2% of families and 26.1% of the population were below the poverty line, including 39.6% of those under 18 and 12.1% of those 65 or over.

== Education ==
The City of Tye is served by the Merkel Independent School District.
