= Winter of 1917–18 in the United States =

Harsh winter in the United States

In the United States, the winter of 1917–18 was a harsh winter greatly affecting the Great Lakes region and Gulf Coast of the United States, but also affecting the Great Plains, the Southwestern United States and the Mid-Atlantic.

== Timeline ==
=== Summer and autumn 1917 ===
Beginning on August 8, 1917, a series of anticyclones which originated in Canada's Northwest Territories entered through the Minnesota, North Dakota and Wisconsin area. By August 9, the area's first freezing temperatures of the season were recorded. Other anticyclones followed on August 27, September 8 and September 22, which encroached through the Mississippi Valley. When three more entered on October 18, 20 and 22, respectively, anticyclones shifted into the Gulf Coast region, causing snowstorms in the Great Lakes and Upland South regions – with as much as 17.5 inches (44 cm) of prewinter snowfall in Wisconsin, 15 inches (38 cm) in West Virginia and more than 2 feet (61 cm) in the Black Hills – and light snow in Kentucky and Tennessee. In late October, a strong Rocky Mountain Front caused negative temperatures in Colorado.

Despite the cold, California recorded its then-hottest temperature, even with snowstorms in Northern California, and parts of the Great Plains recorded some of their hottest Novembers. The Mid-Atlantic got colder throughout November.

=== Winter 1917–18 ===
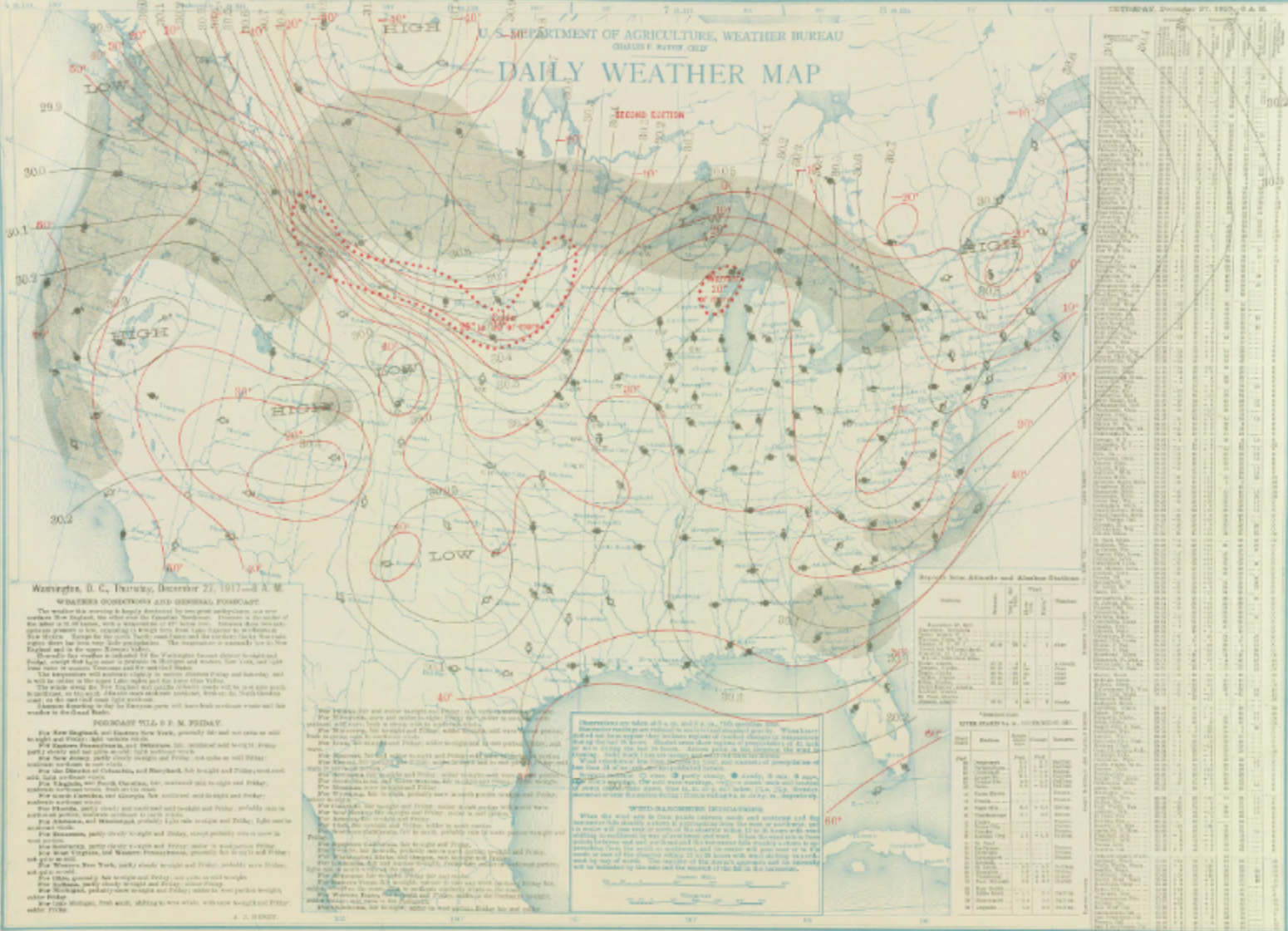
December 30, 1917, weather map of the United States

Continuing from October, cold fronts from the Northwest Territory entered into the Great Plains on December 3 and 7. With another cyclone entering the Southern Great Plains, large amounts of snow landed across Oklahoma and Arkansas. This cyclone travelled northwest, leaving heavy snow across the Ohio Valley – a stretch less than 50 miles (80 km) wide, and left after crossing Western New York and Lake Ontario, leaving the former in more than 2 feet (60 cm) of snow. The cyclones slowed for some time, until December 27, when the winter's strongest cyclone entered the Mid-Atlantic, causing the lowest recorded temperatures in Tennessee (in Mountain City) and West Virginia (in Lewisburg) on December 30; both are yet to be beat.

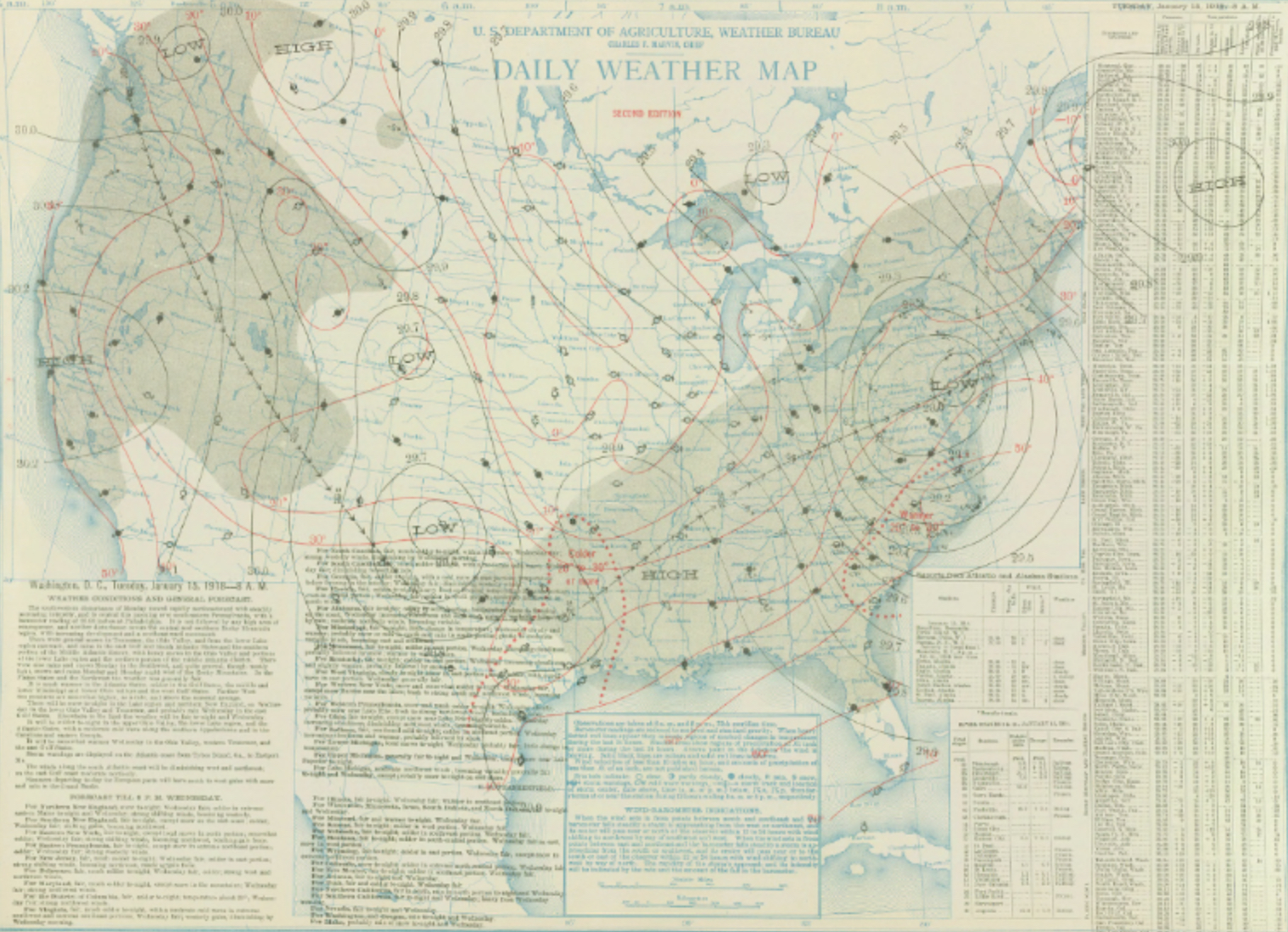
January 15, 1918, weather map of the United States

A cyclone entered from Alberta on January 10, 1918, travelling through Milwaukee and Chicago, leaving 52.6 inches (134 cm) and 42.5 inches (108 cm) of snow, respectively. Snowfall exceeding 4 feet (120 cm) also landed in the Ozarks and the Ohio Valley.

In February 1918, a cold wave occurred in the Northeastern United States, causing a thick ice layer to form over the Nantucket Sound, with Nantucket being connected to the mainland via an ice bridge.

=== Aftermath ===
The winter of 1917–18 caused a temporary shift in industry, with companies in industries such as maritime and rail transport having to temporarily stop operations. Notably, small ships in the Nantucket Sound were stuck in ice throughout January and February, and the Illinois Central Railroad operated no trains during a weekend in January.

The winter came to be known as the "old-fashioned winter", for the winter was on par with stories of cold winters elderly people would talk about.

It remains as the coldest winter in the Ohio Valley, with snowfall occurring in late summer.
