= Abilene metropolitan area =

- Metropolitan statistical area
- Abilene, TX MSA
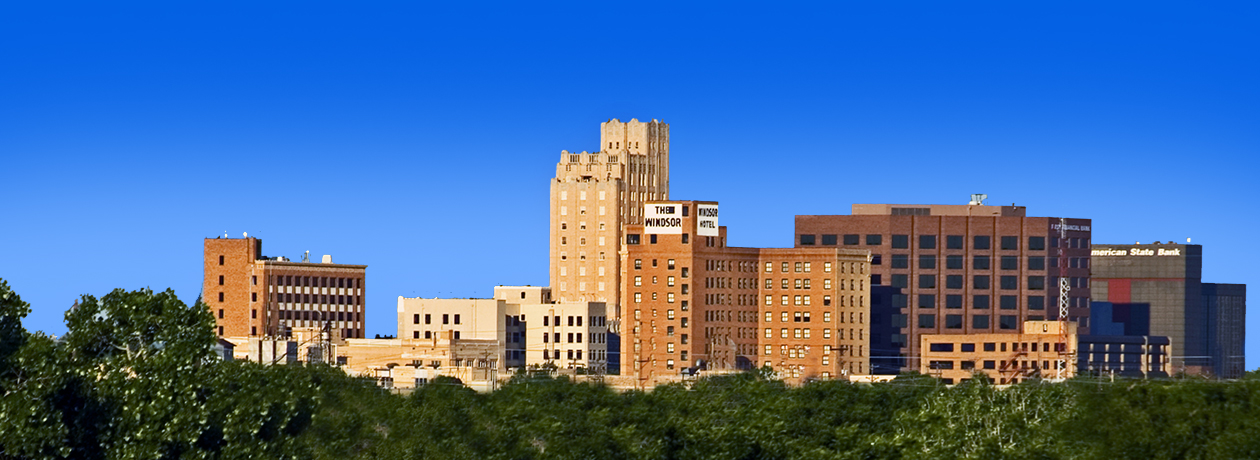
- Downtown Abilene
Interactive Map of Abilene–Sweetwater, TX CSA
City of Abilene
Abilene, TX MSA
Sweetwater, TX µSA
- Country: United States
- State: Texas
- Largest city: Abilene
- Other cities: Clyde Merkel Stamford

Area
  - Total: 2,757 sq mi (7,140 km^{2})

Population
  - Total: 176,579
  - Rank: 243rd in the U.S.
  - Density: 62/sq mi (24/km^{2})
- Time zone: UTC-6 (CST)
  - Summer (DST): UTC-5 (CDT)

The Abilene metropolitan statistical area is a metropolitan statistical area in west-central Texas that covers three counties—Taylor, Jones, and Callahan. As of the 2020 census, the MSA had a population of 176,579.

== Counties ==
- Callahan
- Jones
- Taylor

== Communities ==
=== Places with more than 100,000 people ===
- Abilene (Principal city)

=== Places with 5,000 to 100,000 people ===
- Dyess AFB

=== Places with 2,500 to 5,000 people ===
- Clyde
- Merkel
- Stamford (partial)

=== Places with 1,000 to 2,500 people ===
- Anson
- Baird
- Hamlin (partial)
- Potosi
- Tye

=== Places with fewer than 1,000 people ===
- Buffalo Gap
- Cross Plains
- Hawley
- Impact
- Lawn
- Lueders
- Putnam
- Trent
- Tuscola

=== Unincorporated places ===
- Avoca
- Caps
- Cottonwood
- Eula
- Nugent
- Ovalo
- View
- Hamby

== Demographics ==
As of the census of 2000, 160,245 people, 58,475 households, and 40,799 families were residing within the MSA. The racial makeup of the MSA was 81.52% White, 6.83% African American, 0.57% Native American, 1.07% Asian, 7.84% from other races, and 2.19% from two or more races. Hispanics or Latinos of any race were 17.15% of the population.

The median income for a household in the MSA was $32,023 and for a family was $37,805. Males had a median income of $27,647 versus $19,523 for females. The per capita income for the MSA was $19,523.

== Transportation ==
=== Major highways ===
==== Interstates ====
- Interstate 20
- I-20 has several business routes within the Abilene MSA.

==== US highways ====
- US 80 (former)
- US 83
- US 84
- US 180
- US 277
- US 283

==== State highways ====
- State Highway 6
- State Highway 36
- State Highway 92
- State Highway 206
- Loop 322
- SH 351

== See also ==
- List of cities in Texas
- List of museums in West Texas
- Texas census statistical areas
- List of Texas metropolitan areas
