= Potosi, Texas =

Census-designated place in Taylor County, Texas, United States

- Census-designated place
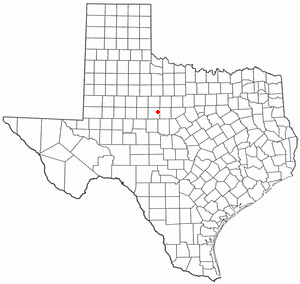
- Location of Potosi, Texas

- Coordinates: 32°20′25″N 99°40′44″W
- Country: United States
- State: Texas
- County: Taylor

Area
  - Total: 18.5 sq mi (47.8 km^{2})
  - Land: 18.5 sq mi (47.8 km^{2})
  - Water: 0 sq mi (0.0 km^{2})
- Elevation: 1,814 ft (553 m)

Population (2020)
  - Total: 3,947
  - Density: 214/sq mi (82.6/km^{2})
- Time zone: UTC-6 (Central (CST))
  - Summer (DST): UTC-5 (CDT)
- ZIP code: 79602
- Area code: 325
- FIPS code: 48-59108
- GNIS feature ID: 2409098

Potosi is a census-designated place (CDP) in Taylor County, Texas, United States. As of the 2020 census, Potosi had a population of 3,947. It is part of the Abilene, Texas metropolitan statistical area.

== Geography ==
Potosi is located along FM 1750, approximately nine miles south of Abilene in east-central Taylor County.

According to the United States Census Bureau, the CDP has a total area of 18.5 sq mi (47.8 km^{2}), all land.

=== Climate ===
According to the Köppen climate classification, Potosi has a humid subtropical climate, Cfa on climate maps, typically characterized by hot, humid summers and generally mild to cool winters. Potosi also borders the neighboring semiarid climate (Köppen BSh or BSk) of the west-central Texas region, which has characteristically long, hot summers and short, moderate winters.

== History ==
The first settlers in the area were the Pollard family in the 1870s. In 1893, R.A. Pollard applied for a post office and chose the name Potosi after the Mexican city of San Luis Potosí. An estimated 100 inhabitants were living in the community in 1896. By 1940, 80 residents, a school, a church, four businesses, and a number of dwellings were there. In 1949, Potosi's school consolidated with the Wylie Independent School District.

The population declined to 20 during the 1950s, and rose to 149 in 1968. Significant growth in the area, aided by its proximity to Abilene, began to occur in the late 1980s, and by 1992, 1,441 people were living in Potosi. That growth has continued to date, as new subdivisions are being constructed and expanded along FM 1750, the main route through Potosi. They include Deerwood, Pack Saddle Prairie, Blackhawk Estates, Pack Saddle Farms, Seven Winds, and Pack Saddle Meadows.

== Demographics ==
Historical population
| Census | Pop. | Note | %± |
|---|---|---|---|
| 1990 | 1,441 | | — |
| 2000 | 1,664 | | 15.5% |
| 2010 | 2,991 | | 79.7% |
| 2020 | 3,947 | | 32.0% |
U.S. Decennial Census; 1850–1900 1910; 1920 1930 1940; 1950 1960 1970; 1980 1990 2000; 2010

Potosi first appeared as a census designated place in the 1990 U.S. census.

=== Racial and ethnic composition ===
Potosi CDP, Texas – Racial and ethnic composition Note: the US Census treats Hispanic/Latino as an ethnic category. This table excludes Latinos from the racial categories and assigns them to a separate category. Hispanics/Latinos may be of any race.
| Race / Ethnicity (NH = Non-Hispanic) | Pop 2000 | Pop 2010 | Pop 2020 | % 2000 | % 2010 | % 2020 |
|---|---|---|---|---|---|---|
| White alone (NH) | 1,544 | 2,634 | 3,112 | 92.79% | 88.06% | 78.84% |
| Black or African American alone (NH) | 11 | 33 | 42 | 0.66% | 1.10% | 1.06% |
| Native American or Alaska Native alone (NH) | 1 | 5 | 13 | 0.06% | 0.17% | 0.33% |
| Asian alone (NH) | 10 | 48 | 61 | 0.60% | 1.60% | 1.55% |
| Native Hawaiian or Pacific Islander alone (NH) | 1 | 6 | 11 | 0.06% | 0.20% | 0.28% |
| Other race alone (NH) | 2 | 1 | 21 | 0.12% | 0.03% | 0.53% |
| Mixed race or Multiracial (NH) | 8 | 59 | 176 | 0.48% | 1.97% | 4.46% |
| Hispanic or Latino (any race) | 87 | 205 | 511 | 5.23% | 6.85% | 12.95% |
| Total | 1,664 | 2,991 | 3,947 | 100.00% | 100.00% | 100.00% |

=== 2020 census ===
As of the 2020 census, Potosi had a population of 3,947. There were 1,372 households, including 1,032 families.

The median age was 39.4 years. 26.6% of residents were under the age of 18 and 14.9% were 65 years of age or older. For every 100 females, there were 100.5 males, and for every 100 females age 18 and over there were 100.1 males age 18 and over.

41.8% of residents lived in urban areas, while 58.2% lived in rural areas.

Of the 1,372 households, 37.9% had children under the age of 18 living in them. Of all households, 76.1% were married-couple households, 9.5% were households with a male householder and no spouse or partner present, and 11.4% were households with a female householder and no spouse or partner present. About 13.8% of all households were made up of individuals, and 7.4% had someone living alone who was 65 years of age or older.

There were 1,454 housing units, of which 5.6% were vacant. The homeowner vacancy rate was 1.3% and the rental vacancy rate was 8.7%.

=== 2000 census ===
As of the census of 2000, 1,664 people, 589 households, and 501 families resided in the CDP. The population density was 90.1 people/sq mi (34.8/km^{2}). The 624 housing units averaged 33.8/sq mi (13.1/km^{2}). The racial makeup of the CDP was 95.25% White, 0.66% African American, 0.30% Native American, 0.66% Asian, 0.06% Pacific Islander, 2.04% from other races, and 1.02% from two or more races. Hispanics or Latinos of any race were 5.23% of the population.

Of the 589 households, 42.6% had children under the age of 18 living with them, 75.0% were married couples living together, 6.6% had a female householder with no husband present, and 14.9% were not families; 12.7% of all households were made up of individuals, and 5.4% had someone living alone who was 65 years of age or older. The average household size was 2.83 and the average family size was 3.08.

In the CDP, the age distribution was 27.6% under 18, 6.8% from 18 to 24, 29.1% from 25 to 44, 26.7% from 45 to 64, and 9.7% who were 65 or older. The median age was 38 years. For every 100 females, there were 95.5 males. For every 100 females age 18 and over, there were 92.9 males.

The median income for a household in the CDP was $49,438, and for a family was $56,471. Males had a median income of $38,839 versus $20,822 for females. The per capita income for the CDP was $19,997. About 9.5% of families and 7.9% of the population were below the poverty line, including 6.8% of those under age 18 and 22.6% of those age 65 or over.

== Education ==
The community of Potosi is served by the Wylie Independent School District of Abilene.

== Services ==
The residents of Potosi, Texas receive water from the Potosi Water Supply Corporation, and they are protected by the Potosi Volunteer Fire Department.

== See also ==
- List of census-designated places in Texas
