= Caps, Texas =

Caps
- Unincorporated community
- Location within the state of Texas Caps (the United States)
- Coordinates: 32°22′23″N 99°50′49″W
- Country: United States
- State: Texas
- County: Taylor
- Time zone: UTC-6 (Central (CST))
  - Summer (DST): UTC-5 (CDT)
- GNIS feature ID: 1332146

Caps is an unincorporated community in Taylor County, Texas, United States. It is located southwest of Abilene near the intersection of U.S. Highway 277 and FM 707. The community is part of the Abilene Metropolitan Statistical Area.

Caps was first settled in the early 1880s. The area was known as Border's Chapel until 1905. That year, residents gathered to select a new name for the community. A man reportedly threw his cap in the air and said, "Let's call it caps," and the idea was approved.

In 1935, Butterfield School was constructed between the communities of Caps and View. The name was chosen in honor of the Butterfield Overland Mail line, a semi-weekly mail and passenger stage service from St. Louis, Missouri, and Memphis, Tennessee, across northern Texas to San Francisco, California that operated from 1858 to 1861. The school opened in 1936 and served students in grades one through ten.

The opening of the Camp Barkeley military installation in 1940 shifted area commercial activity to U.S. Highway 277. When it closed in 1945, the site became a commercial feedlot. Aircraft noise from Dyess Air Force Base, which opened in 1953, forced two Caps community churches to move closer to Abilene.

In 1978, Butterfield School consolidated with the Wylie Independent School District. It remained operational until its closure at the end of the 2005–2006 school year. A dispute over territorial rights between the city of Abilene and the View-Caps Water Supply Corporation began in 1979 and became known as one of Abilene's longest legal battles.

Caps had a population of approximately 300 in 1985, up from 75 in 1965. A year later in 1986, the city of Abilene annexed a portion of the community, fifty of which were View-Caps water customers. In 1990 and 2000, the community had a population of around 100 residents.
