= Eula Independent School District =

School district in Texas

Eula Independent School District is a public school district located in northwestern Callahan County, Texas, United States. A small portion of the district extends into eastern Taylor County.

In 2009, the school district was rated "recognized" by the Texas Education Agency.

== Schools ==
The District includes:

- Eula Elementary School
- Eula Middle School
- Eula High School
