= Trent, Texas =

- Town
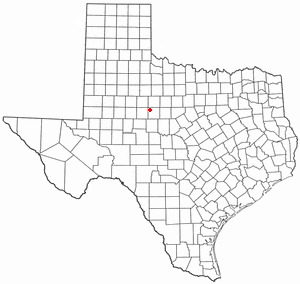
- Location of Trent, Texas

- Coordinates: 32°29′18″N 100°07′30″W
- Country: United States
- State: Texas
- County: Taylor

Area
  - Total: 0.41 sq mi (1.05 km^{2})
  - Land: 0.41 sq mi (1.05 km^{2})
  - Water: 0 sq mi (0.00 km^{2})
- Elevation: 1,916 ft (584 m)

Population (2020)
  - Total: 295
  - Density: 728/sq mi (281/km^{2})
- Time zone: UTC-6 (Central (CST))
  - Summer (DST): UTC-5 (CDT)
- ZIP code: 79561
- Area code: 325
- FIPS code: 48-73580
- GNIS feature ID: 2413398
- Website: trent.municipalimpact.com

Trent is a town in Taylor County, Texas, United States, that was established in 1881. The population was 295 at the 2020 census. It is part of the Abilene, Texas Metropolitan Statistical Area. Trent, Texas was named in honor of West Texas pioneer and cattleman, Isaac Riley Trent.

== Geography ==
According to the United States Census Bureau, the town has a total area of 0.4 square miles (1.1 km^{2}), all land.

=== Climate ===
This climate type occurs primarily on the periphery of the true deserts in low-latitude semiarid steppe regions. The Köppen climate classification subtype for this climate is BSk (tropical and subtropical steppe climate).

== Demographics ==
Historical population
Census	Pop.	Note	%±
1930	412		—
1940	366		−11.2%
1950	296		−19.1%
1960	298		0.7%
1970	333		11.7%
1980	313		−6.0%
1990	319		1.9%
2000	318		−0.3%
2010	337		6.0%
2020	295		−12.5%
U.S. Decennial Census

=== 2020 census ===
Trent racial composition (NH = Non-Hispanic) (Note: Note: the US Census treats Hispanic/Latino as an ethnic category. This table excludes Latinos from the racial categories and assigns them to a separate category. Hispanics/Latinos can be of any race.)
Race	Number	Percentage
White (NH)	240	81.36%
Black or African American (NH)	2	0.68%
Native American or Alaska Native (NH)	2	0.68%
Some Other Race (NH)	3	1.02%
Mixed/Multi-Racial (NH)	14	4.75%
Hispanic or Latino	34	11.53%
Total	295	

As of the 2020 United States census, there were 295 people, 78 households, and 48 families residing in the town.

=== 2000 census ===
As of the census of 2000, 318 people, 130 households, and 86 families resided in the town. The population density was 775.7 inhabitants per square mile (299.5/km^{2}). The 150 housing units averaged 365.9 per square mile (141.3/km^{2}). The racial makeup of the town was 91.82% White, 2.83% African American, 1.57% Native American, 0.31% Asian, 2.52% from other races, and 0.94% from two or more races. Hispanics or Latinos of any race were 10.06% of the population.

Of the 130 households, 33.1% had children under the age of 18 living with them, 54.6% were married couples living together, 6.2% had a female householder with no husband present, and 33.8% were not families. About 29.2% of all households were made up of individuals, and 17.7% had someone living alone who was 65 years of age or older. The average household size was 2.45 and the average family size was 3.05.

In the town, the population was distributed as 25.5% under the age of 18, 8.5% from 18 to 24, 28.0% from 25 to 44, 20.4% from 45 to 64, and 17.6% who were 65 years of age or older. The median age was 38 years. For every 100 females, there were 86.0 males. For every 100 females age 18 and over, there were 91.1 males.

The median income for a household in the town was $40,156, and for a family was $41,591. Males had a median income of $30,417 versus $16,250 for females. The per capita income for the town was $16,878. About 7.4% of families and 9.2% of the population were below the poverty line, including 8.8% of those under age 18 and 6.1% of those age 65 or over.
