= Merkel, Texas =

City in Taylor County, Texas, United States

- City
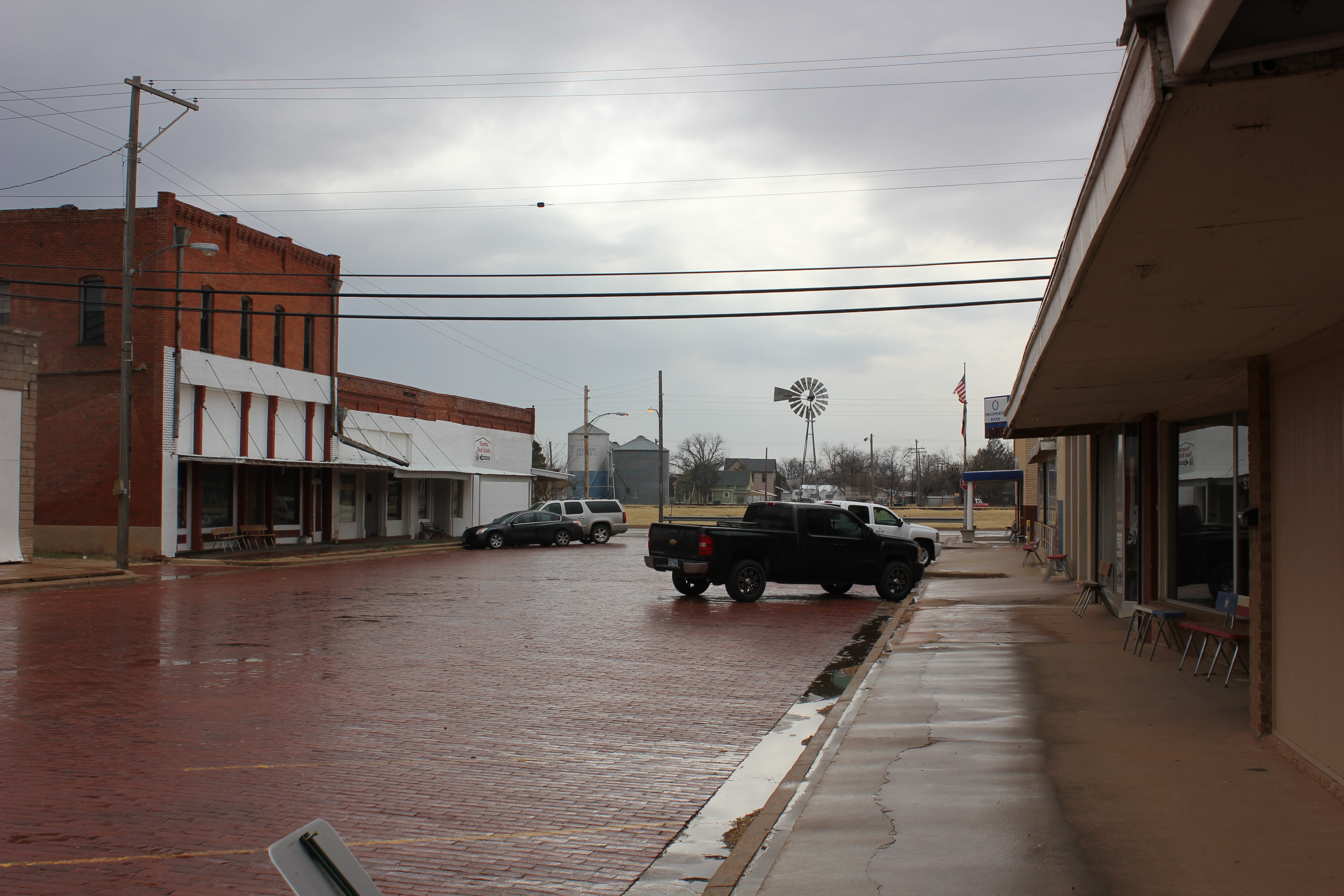
- Street in Merkel, March 2014

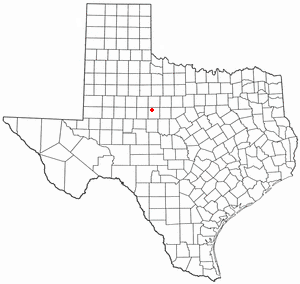
- Location of Merkel, Texas

- Coordinates: 32°28′12″N 100°00′12″W
- Country: United States
- State: Texas
- County: Taylor

Area
  - Total: 2.80 sq mi (7.25 km^{2})
  - Land: 2.80 sq mi (7.25 km^{2})
  - Water: 0 sq mi (0.00 km^{2})
- Elevation: 1,870 ft (570 m)

Population (2020)
  - Total: 2,471
  - Density: 883.1/sq mi (340.98/km^{2})
- Time zone: UTC-6 (Central (CST))
  - Summer (DST): UTC-5 (CDT)
- ZIP code: 79536
- Area code: 325
- FIPS code: 48-47796
- GNIS feature ID: 2412986
- Website: merkeltexas.com

Merkel is a city in Taylor County, Texas, United States. Its population was 2,471 at the 2020 census. It is part of the Abilene metropolitan area.

== Geography ==
Merkel is located 17 miles west of Abilene near Interstate 20. The town has a total area of 2.8 square miles (7.2 km^{2}), all land.

=== Climate ===
According to the Köppen climate classification, Merkel has a semiarid climate, BSk on climate maps.

Climate data for Merkel, TX (1991-2020 normals, station coordinates:32.4096°N 100.0846°W)
Month	Jan	Feb	Mar	Apr	May	Jun	Jul	Aug	Sep	Oct	Nov	Dec	Year
Average precipitation inches	1.09	1.53	1.87	2.03	3.00	2.33	2.12	2.92	3.15	2.90	1.66	1.08	25.68
Average precipitation mm	28	39	47	52	76	59	54	74	80	74	42	27	652
Average precipitation days (≥ 0.01 in)	3.2	5.0	5.9	5.6	9.0	5.8	4.9	6.1	8.1	5.3	4.5	4.7	68.1
Source: NOAA

== History ==
Around 1870, when the Texas and Pacific Railway was built, the city was founded as Windmill Town. In 1881, it was renamed as Merkel in honor of the first settler in this area, S. M. Merkel, from Germany. In 1882, the first mercantile store and in 1883, the first post office opened.

== Demographics ==
=== 2020 census ===
Merkel racial composition (NH = Non-Hispanic) (Note: Note: the US Census treats Hispanic/Latino as an ethnic category. This table excludes Latinos from the racial categories and assigns them to a separate category. Hispanics/Latinos can be of any race.)
Race	Number	Percentage
White (NH)	1,778	71.95%
Black or African American (NH)	26	1.05%
Native American or Alaska Native (NH)	9	0.36%
Asian (NH)	5	0.2%
Some other race (NH)	2	0.12%
Mixed/multracial (NH)	80	3.24%
Hispanic or Latino	570	23.07%
Total	2,471	

As of the 2020 United States census, 2,471 people, 875 households, and 640 families were residing in the town.

=== 2000 census ===
Historical population
Census	Pop.	Note	%±
1890	353		—
1910	2,008		—
1920	1,810		−9.9%
1930	1,848		2.1%
1940	2,005		8.5%
1950	2,338		16.6%
1960	2,312		−1.1%
1970	2,163		−6.4%
1980	2,493		15.3%
1990	2,469		−1.0%
2000	2,637		6.8%
2010	2,590		−1.8%
2020	2,471		−4.6%
U.S. Decennial Census

As of the 2000 census, 2,637 people 1,012 households, and 719 families resided in the town. The population density was 1,342.0 inhabitants per square mile (518.1/km^{2}). The 1,202 housing units averaged 611.7 per square mile (236.8/km^{2}). The racial makeup of the town was 89.42% White, 1.14% African American, 0.61% Native American, 0.30% Asian, 6.37% from other races, and 2.16% from two or more races. Hispanics or Latinos of any race were 14.22% of the population.

Of the 1,012 households, 37.9% had children under 18 still living with them, 54.7% were married couples living together, 13.3% had a female householder with no husband present, and 28.9% were not families. About 25.9% of all households were made up of individuals, and 14.7% had someone living alone who was 65 or older. The average household size was 2.56, and the average family size was 3.08.

In the town, the population was distributed as 28.2% under 18, 8.3% from 18 to 24, 27.0% from 25 to 44, 20.7% from 45 to 64, and 15.8% who were 65 or older. The median age was 36 years. For every 100 females, there were 88.2 males. For every 100 females 18 and over, there were 80.3 males.

The median income for a household in the town was $29,083, and for a family was $34,250. Males had a median income of $30,000 versus $16,620 for females. The per capita income for the town was $13,292. About 9.9% of families and 13.6% of the population were below the poverty line, including 14.6% of those under age 18 and 14.0% of those age 65 or over.

== Education ==
The City of Merkel is served by the Merkel Independent School District.

== Notable people ==
- Cody Lambert (born 1961), professional rodeo cowboy, was raised in Merkel.
- Tommy Robison (born 1961), football player

== See also ==
- List of municipalities in Texas
