= Taylor County, Texas =

County in Texas, United States

- County
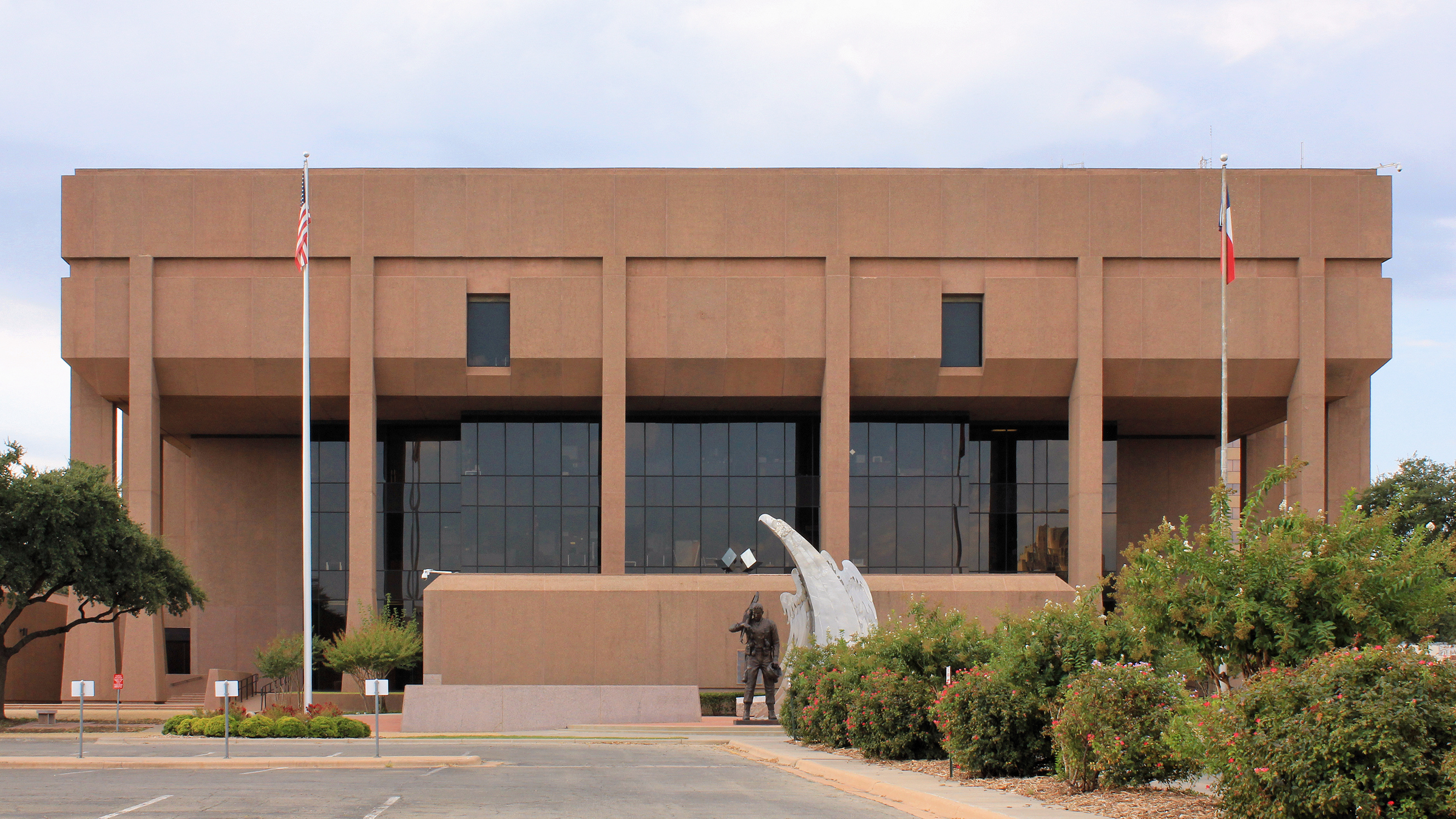
- New Taylor County Courthouse in Abilene

- Location within the U.S. state of Texas
- Coordinates: 32°19′N 99°53′W
- Country: United States
- State: Texas
- Founded: 1878
- Named for: Edward, George, and James Taylor
- Seat: Abilene
- Largest city: Abilene

Area
  - Total: 919.3 sq mi (2,381 km^{2})
  - Land: 915.6 sq mi (2,371 km^{2})
  - Water: 3.8 sq mi (9.8 km^{2}) 0.4%

Population (2020)
  - Total: 143,208
  - Estimate (2025): 150,077 ▲
  - Density: 160/sq mi (62/km^{2})
- Time zone: UTC−6 (Central)
  - Summer (DST): UTC−5 (CDT)
- Congressional district: 19th
- Website: www.taylorcounty.texas.gov

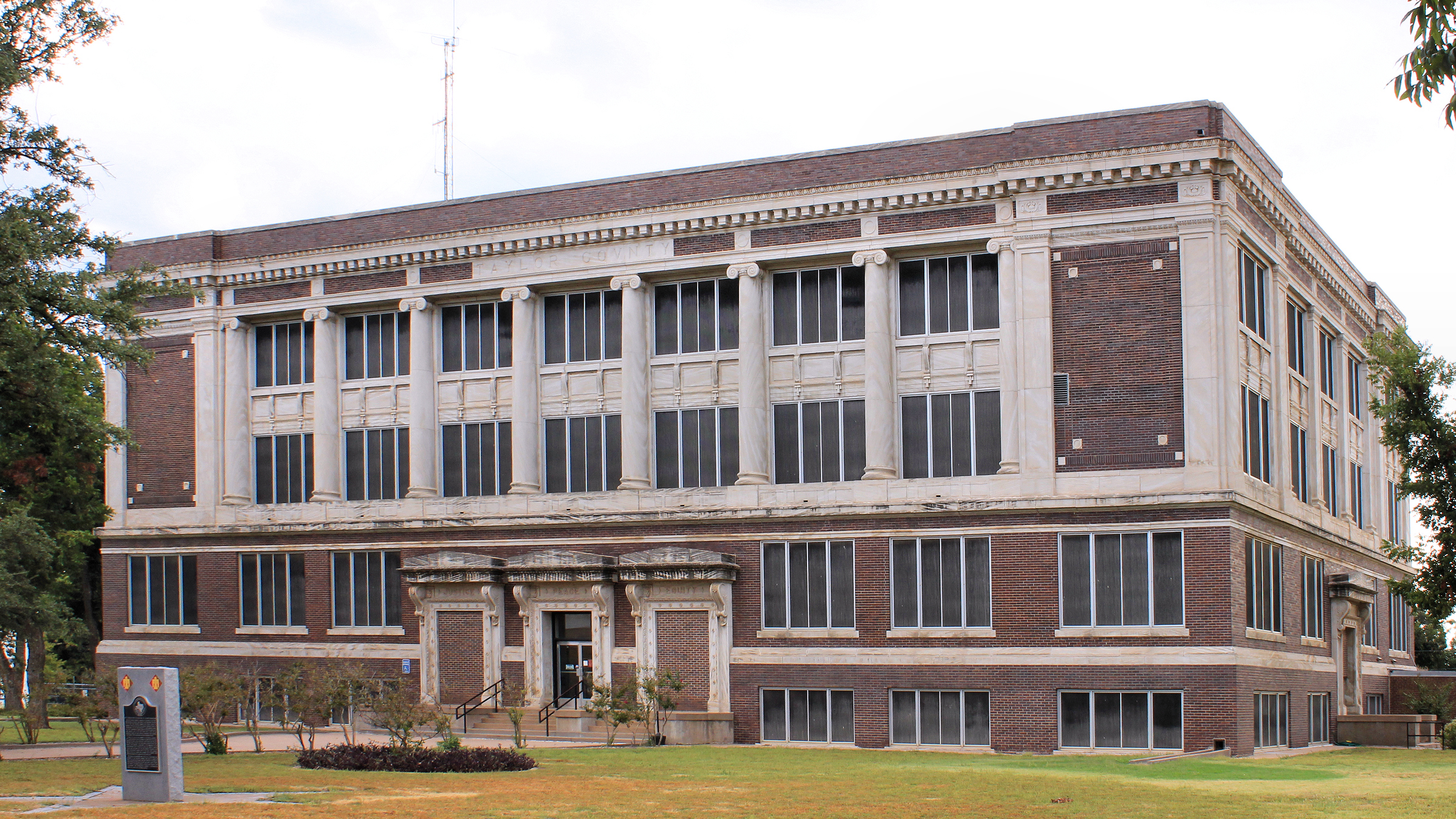
The Old Taylor County Courthouse has limited use.

Taylor County is a county located in the U.S. state of Texas. As of the 2020 census, its population was 143,208. Its county seat is Abilene. The county was created in 1858 and later organized in 1878. It is named for Edward Taylor, George Taylor, and James Taylor, three brothers who died at the Battle of the Alamo.

Taylor County is included in the Abilene, TX metropolitan statistical area, and is considered part of West Texas.

== History ==
Among first inhabitants of the area were the Penteka. In 1849, Capt. Randolph Marcy, a U. S. Army engineer, passed through, scouting out West Texas-to-California routes. The Texas Legislature established Taylor County in 1858 from Bexar and Travis Counties. The county is named for Alamo defenders Edward, James, and George Taylor. The Butterfield Overland Mail established the Mountain Pass Station at Merkel; it was in continual use until 1861.

By 1872, the first cattlemen had ventured into present Taylor County. Six years later, Taylor County was organized. Buffalo Gap was named county seat. In 1880, the Texas & Pacific Railroad signed an agreement to run tracks through the future city of Abilene. Abilene was established in 1882, and named after Abilene, Kansas. Abilene became the county seat in 1883. A wagon train of 10 Baptist families arrived in the county that year.

The Abilene Board of Trade was organized in 1890, when 587 farms and ranches were in the county. The next year, Hardin-Simmons University was established as Abilene Baptist College by the Sweetwater Baptist Association. Lytle Lake was created in 1897.

The State Epileptic Colony opened in Abilene in 1904. In 1906, Abilene Christian University opened its doors as Childers Classical Institute. In the 1920s, Hendricks Medical Center opened in Abilene as West Texas Baptist Sanitarium (1924) and the West Texas Historical Association was chartered in Abilene. The first senior class of McMurry University graduated (1926). Oil was discovered in the county a few years later (1929).

In 1933, Abilene donated land for use by the Civilian Conservation Corps.

Dyess Air Force Base was established as Abilene AFB in 1942; it is named in honor of Texas native and Bataan Death March survivor Lieutenant Colonel William Dyess. The Abilene Philharmonic Orchestra was created, with Jay Dietzer as the first conductor, in 1950. The Buffalo Gap Historic Village opened in 1956.

== Geography ==
According to the U.S. Census Bureau, the county has a total area of 919 sq mi (2,380 km^{2}), of which 916 sq mi (2,370 km^{2}) are land and 3.8 sq mi (9.8 km^{2}) (0.4%) are covered by water.

=== Major highways ===
- Interstate 20
- Interstate 20 Business
- U.S. Highway 83
- U.S. Highway 84
- U.S. Highway 277
- State Highway 36
- State Highway 153
- State Highway 351
- Loop 322

=== Adjacent counties ===
- Jones County (north)
- Shackelford County (northeast)
- Callahan County (east)
- Coleman County (southeast)
- Runnels County (south)
- Nolan County (west)
- Fisher County (northwest)

== Demographics ==
Historical population
Census	Pop.	Note	%±
1880	1,736		—
1890	6,957		300.7%
1900	10,499		50.9%
1910	26,293		150.4%
1920	24,081		−8.4%
1930	41,023		70.4%
1940	44,147		7.6%
1950	63,370		43.5%
1960	101,078		59.5%
1970	97,853		−3.2%
1980	110,932		13.4%
1990	119,655		7.9%
2000	126,555		5.8%
2010	131,506		3.9%
2020	143,208		8.9%
2025 (est.)	150,077	▲	4.8%
U.S. Decennial Census; 1850–2010 2010 2020

=== Racial and ethnic composition ===
Taylor County, Texas – Racial and ethnic composition Note: the US Census treats Hispanic/Latino as an ethnic category. This table excludes Latinos from the racial categories and assigns them to a separate category. Hispanics/Latinos may be of any race.
Race / Ethnicity (NH = Non-Hispanic)	Pop 1980	Pop 1990	Pop 2000	Pop 2010	Pop 2020	% 1980	% 1990	% 2000	% 2010	% 2020
White alone (NH)	89,703	92,955	91,999	88,121	87,316	80.86%	77.69%	72.69%	67.01%	60.97%
Black or African American alone (NH)	6,590	7,336	8,243	9,122	10,980	5.94%	6.13%	6.51%	6.94%	7.67%
Native American or Alaska Native alone (NH)	307	366	494	532	589	0.28%	0.31%	0.39%	0.40%	0.41%
Asian alone (NH)	751	1,342	1,523	1,978	2,815	0.68%	1.12%	1.20%	1.50%	1.97%
Native Hawaiian or Pacific Islander alone (NH)	x	x	67	105	161	x	x	0.05%	0.08%	0.11%
Other race alone (NH)	378	145	104	133	468	0.34%	0.12%	0.08%	0.10%	0.33%
Multiracial (NH)	x	x	1,797	2,441	6,123	x	x	1.42%	1.86%	4.28%
Hispanic or Latino (any race)	13,203	17,511	22,328	29,074	34,756	11.90%	14.63%	17.64%	22.11%	24.27%
Total	110,932	119,655	126,555	131,506	143,208	100.00%	100.00%	100.00%	100.00%	100.00%

=== 2020 census ===
As of the 2020 census, the county had a population of 143,208. The median age was 34.6 years; 24.2% of the residents were under 18 and 15.5% were 65 or older. For every 100 females, there were 95.4 males, and for every 100 females 18 and over, there were 92.5 males 18 and over.

The racial makeup of the county was 69.3% White, 8.2% Black or African American, 0.9% American Indian and Alaska Native, 2.0% Asian, 0.1% Native Hawaiian and Pacific Islander, 7.4% from some other race, and 12.0% from two or more races. Hispanic or Latino residents of any race comprised 24.3% of the population.

About 82.5% of residents lived in urban areas, while 17.5% lived in rural areas.

Of the 54,489 households in the county, 31.9% had children under 18 living in them, 47.1% were married-couple households, 19.3% were households with a male householder and no spouse or partner present, and 27.5% were households with a female householder and no spouse or partner present. About 27.9% of all households were made up of individuals, and 10.5% had someone living alone who was 65 or older.

The county had 60,817 housing units, of which 10.4% were vacant. Among occupied housing units, 59.7% were owner-occupied and 40.3% were renter-occupied. The homeowner vacancy rate was 2.2% and the rental vacancy rate was 11.1%.

=== 2000 census ===
As of the 2000 census, 126,555 people, 47,274 households, and 32,524 families resided in the county. The population density was 138 people per square mile (53 people/km^{2}). The 52,056 housing units averaged 57 units per square mile (22 units/km^{2}). The racial makeup of the county was 80.61% White, 6.73% Black or African American, 0.58% Native American, 1.25% Asian, 0.07% Pacific Islander, 8.35% from other races, and 2.42% from two or more races. About 17.64% of the population was Hispanic or Latino of any race.

Of the 47,274 households, 34.70% had children under 18 living with them, 53.80% were married couples living together, 11.50% had a female householder with no husband present, and 31.20% were not families. About 25.70% of all households were made up of individuals, and 9.70% had someone living alone who was 65or older. The average household size was 2.54, and the average family size was 3.07.

In the county, the age distribution was as 26.6% under 18, 13.8% from 18 to 24, 27.8% from 25 to 44, 19.3% from 45 to 64, and 12.4% who were 65 or older. The median age was 32 years. For every 100 females, there were 94.10 males. For every 100 females 18 and over, there were 91.10 males.

The median income in the county for a household was $34,035 and for a family was $40,859. Males had a median income of $28,964 versus $21,021 for females. The per capita income for the county was $17,176. About 10.40% of families and 14.50% of the population were below the poverty line, including 17.60% of those under 18 and 9.20% of those 65 or over.

== Communities ==
=== Cities ===
- Abilene (county seat) (small part in Jones County)
- Tuscola
- Tye
- Merkel

=== Towns ===
- Buffalo Gap
- Impact
- Lawn
- Trent

=== Census-designated place ===
- Potosi

=== Unincorporated communities ===
- Caps
- Hamby
- Ovalo
- View
- Wylie

=== Military base ===
- Dyess AFB

=== Ghost towns ===
- Inkum

== Politics ==
Taylor County is part of the 71st district for elections to the Texas House of Representatives.

United States presidential election results for Taylor County, Texas
Year	Republican		Democratic		Third party(ies)	
Year	No.	%	No.	%	No.	%
1912	59	3.14%	1,536	81.79%	283	15.07%
1916	120	5.05%	2,134	89.89%	120	5.05%
1920	300	12.31%	1,932	79.25%	206	8.45%
1924	441	12.05%	3,157	86.26%	62	1.69%
1928	4,050	68.07%	1,891	31.78%	9	0.15%
1932	639	10.86%	5,235	88.95%	11	0.19%
1936	678	9.83%	6,169	89.43%	51	0.74%
1940	983	11.11%	7,852	88.72%	15	0.17%
1944	602	6.18%	7,975	81.86%	1,165	11.96%
1948	1,658	15.98%	8,184	78.90%	531	5.12%
1952	10,260	56.22%	7,936	43.48%	55	0.30%
1956	9,488	56.82%	7,177	42.98%	34	0.20%
1960	12,258	56.62%	9,347	43.17%	45	0.21%
1964	9,220	40.76%	13,366	59.09%	34	0.15%
1968	12,218	47.68%	9,107	35.54%	4,301	16.78%
1972	22,417	78.02%	6,024	20.97%	290	1.01%
1976	19,822	57.38%	14,453	41.84%	268	0.78%
1980	22,961	62.00%	13,245	35.77%	826	2.23%
1984	34,444	77.92%	9,628	21.78%	130	0.29%
1988	28,563	67.97%	13,073	31.11%	388	0.92%
1992	22,614	49.75%	12,382	27.24%	10,458	23.01%
1996	23,682	59.17%	13,213	33.02%	3,126	7.81%
2000	31,701	73.69%	10,504	24.42%	815	1.89%
2004	37,197	77.33%	10,648	22.14%	254	0.53%
2008	34,317	72.34%	12,690	26.75%	432	0.91%
2012	32,904	76.06%	9,750	22.54%	609	1.41%
2016	33,250	72.66%	10,085	22.04%	2,424	5.30%
2020	39,547	71.60%	14,588	26.41%	1,098	1.99%
2024	41,198	74.34%	13,624	24.58%	595	1.07%

United States Senate election results for Taylor County, Texas1
Year	Republican		Democratic		Third party(ies)	
Year	No.	%	No.	%	No.	%
2024	39,509	71.51%	14,479	26.21%	1,264	2.29%

United States Senate election results for Taylor County, Texas2
Year	Republican		Democratic		Third party(ies)	
Year	No.	%	No.	%	No.	%
2020	39,887	72.37%	13,704	24.87%	1,522	2.76%

Texas Gubernatorial election results for Taylor County
Year	Republican		Democratic		Third party(ies)	
Year	No.	%	No.	%	No.	%
2022	30,030	76.12%	8,888	22.53%	535	1.36%

== Education ==
School districts include:

- Abilene Independent School District
- Blackwell Consolidated Independent School District
- Clyde Consolidated Independent School District
- Eula Independent School District
- Jim Ned Consolidated Independent School District
- Merkel Independent School District
- Trent Independent School District
- Winters Independent School District
- Wylie Independent School District

The Texas Legislature designated the county as being in the Cisco Junior College District.

== See also ==
- Abilene State Park, recreational facility
- Horse Hollow Wind Energy Center, the world's largest wind farm
- Gary D. McCaleb, former mayor of Abilene
- List of museums in West Texas
- National Register of Historic Places listings in Taylor County, Texas
- Recorded Texas Historic Landmarks in Taylor County
- Charles Perry, member of the Texas Senate from Lubbock, was born in Taylor County in 1962.
