= Jim Taylor (linebacker) =

American football player (1934–2005)

No. 57, 55, 44
- Positions: Center, linebacker

Personal information
- Born: June 27, 1934; Rowden, Texas, U.S.
- Died: February 25, 2005 (aged 70); Abilene, Texas, U.S.
- Listed height: 6 ft 2 in (1.88 m)
- Listed weight: 232 lb (105 kg)

Career information
- High school: Clyde (TX)
- College: Baylor
- NFL draft: 1956: 3rd round, 29th overall pick

Career history
- Pittsburgh Steelers (1956); Chicago Cardinals (1957–1958); Hamilton Tiger-Cats (1959–1960)

Career NFL statistics
- Interceptions: 1
- Fumble recoveries: 1
- Stats at Pro Football Reference

James Glen Taylor (June 27, 1934 – February 25, 2005) was an American professional football center and linebacker who played college football for Baylor and professional football in the National Football League (NFL) for the Pittsburgh Steelers (1956) and Chicago Cardinals (1957–1958). He also played in the Canadian Football League (CFL) for the Hamilton Tiger-Cats in 1959 and 1960. He appeared in a total of 29 NFL games and 28 CFL games.

== Early life ==
Taylor was born in 1934 in Rowden, Texas, and attended Clyde High School in Clyde, Texas. He then played college football at Baylor.

== Professional football ==
He was drafted by the Pittsburgh Steelers in the third round (29th overall pick) in the 1956 NFL draft. He appeared in 12 games, nine as a starter, for the 1956 Steelers. He then played for the Chicago Cardinals in 1957 and 1958, appearing in 17 games.

In August 1959, Taylor signed with the Hamilton Tiger-Cats of the Canadian Football League (CFL). He played for Hamiton in 1959 and 1960, appearing in 28 games. Taylor asked the Tiger Cats in February 1960 to release him so that he could play for Houston in the American Football League, but the Cats refused.

== Later years ==
Taylor died in on February 25, 2005, at the age of 70 in Abilene, Texas.
