= Denton, Callahan County, Texas =

- Unincorporated community
- Location within Texas Location within the United States
- Coordinates: 32°15′31″N 99°32′22″W
- Country: United States
- State: Texas
- County: Callahan
- Elevation: 1,978 ft (603 m)
- Time zone: UTC-6 (Central (CST))
  - Summer (DST): UTC-5 (CDT)
- Area code: 325
- GNIS feature ID: 1378210

Denton is an unincorporated community in Callahan County, in the U.S. state of Texas. According to the Handbook of Texas, only 6 people lived in the community in 2000. It is located within the Abilene metropolitan area.

== Geography ==
Denton is located on Texas State Highway 36, 12 mi (19 km) southwest of Baird in western Callahan County. It is also on Farm to Market Road 604.

== Education ==
Today, the community is served by the Clyde Consolidated Independent School District.
