= Belle Plain =

Belle Plain may refer to:

- Belle Plain, Texas, a ghost town in Callahan County, Texas
- Belle Plain College, a defunct college in Belle Plain, Texas

== See also ==
- Belle Plaine (disambiguation)
- Bell Plain Township, Marshall County, Illinois
