= Baird High School =

Location
- 600 West 7th Street; Baird, Texas 79504; United States; 32.398218°N 99.399902°W

Information
- School type: Public high school
- School district: Baird Independent School District
- Principal: Torrey Price
- Teaching staff: 17.21 (FTE)
- Grades: 9-12
- Enrollment: 148 (2023–2024)
- Student to teacher ratio: 8.60
- Colors: Red & Black
- Athletics conference: UIL Class 1A
- Mascot: Bear
- Yearbook: The Headlight
- Website: Baird High School

Baird High School is a public high school located in Baird, Texas (USA) and classified as a 1A school by the UIL. It is part of the Baird Independent School District located in central Callahan County. For the 2024–2025 school year, the school was given a "D" by the Texas Education Agency.

== Fine Arts ==
In 2019, 2021, and 2023 the Baird High School marching band participated in the Texas State Marching Band Championship. In 2023, the band finished in 7th place in the Conference 1A Texas State Marching Band Championship finals.

== Athletics ==
The Baird Bears compete in these sports:

- Baseball
- Basketball
- Cross Country
- Football
- Golf
- Softball
- Tennis
- Track and Field

=== State Titles ===
- Girls Basketball
  - 1964(1A)
- Boys Golf
  - 1988(1A), 1989(1A), 1994(1A), 1996(1A)
- Girls Golf
  - 1997(1A), 1998(1A), 1999(1A), 2000(1A), 2001(1A), 2002(1A), 2004(1A), 2005(1A), 2009(1A), 2010(1A), 2011(1A)
