= Callahan City, Texas =

Coordinates: 32°20′38″N 99°17′37″W

Callahan City is a ghost town in Callahan County, Texas, United States.

== History ==
Founded in 1876, Callahan City was envisioned as a center of commerce and government for the then quite sparsely populated Callahan County. Located along the Western Trail to Dodge City, the community hosted several merchants who served the trail drivers who passed through the area along with more than 100,000 head of cattle through the mid to late 1870s.

Though a spot of some local importance, Callahan City's relatively remote location hindered its growth; local merchants often had to wait a month or more for goods to be freighted in from Fort Worth. The community was dealt a severe blow in December 1877, when it lost the county seat to neighboring Belle Plain in a hotly contested election. In 1880, Callahan City was bypassed by the railroad, and the few remaining residents dispersed, leaving the town all but abandoned. Today, the former cemetery is all that remains of the community.
