= Putnam, Texas =

- Town
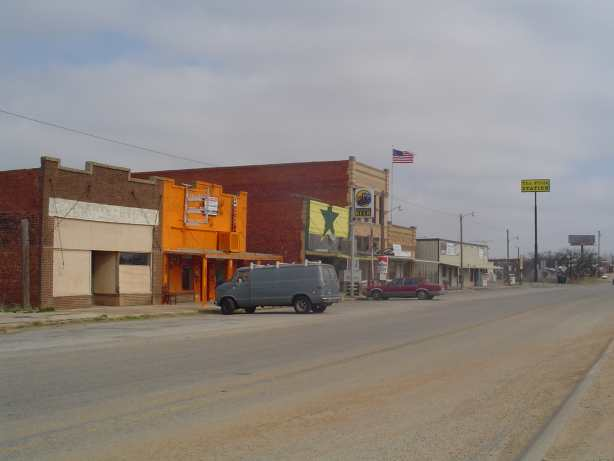
- Downtown Putnam

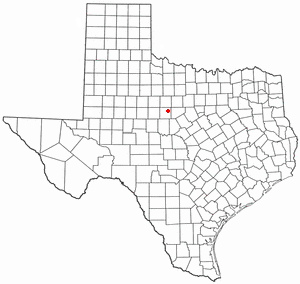
- Location of Putnam, Texas

- Coordinates: 32°22′23″N 99°11′44″W
- Country: United States
- State: Texas
- County: Callahan

Area
  - Total: 1.01 sq mi (2.62 km^{2})
  - Land: 1.01 sq mi (2.62 km^{2})
  - Water: 0 sq mi (0.00 km^{2})
- Elevation: 1,601 ft (488 m)

Population (2020)
  - Total: 63
  - Density: 62.3/sq mi (24.05/km^{2})
- Time zone: UTC-6 (Central (CST))
  - Summer (DST): UTC-5 (CDT)
- ZIP code: 76469
- Area code: 325
- FIPS code: 48-59984
- GNIS feature ID: 2412513

Putnam is a town in Callahan County, Texas, United States. The population was 63 at the 2020 census, down from 94 in 2010. It is part of the Abilene, Texas Metropolitan Statistical Area.

== Geography ==
Putnam is located in northeastern Callahan County. Interstate 20 passes through the town, leading west 12 miles (19 km) to Baird, the county seat, and east 12 miles to Cisco.

According to the United States Census Bureau, the town has a total area of 1.0 square mile (2.6 km^{2}), all land.

=== Climate ===
The climate in this area is characterized by hot summers and generally mild to cool winters. According to the Köppen Climate Classification system, Putnam has a humid subtropical climate, abbreviated "Cfa" on climate maps.

Climate data for Putnam, Texas (1991–2020 normals, extremes 1963–present)
Month	Jan	Feb	Mar	Apr	May	Jun	Jul	Aug	Sep	Oct	Nov	Dec	Year
Record high °F (°C)	89 (32)	96 (36)	97 (36)	102 (39)	109 (43)	110 (43)	109 (43)	111 (44)	109 (43)	101 (38)	93 (34)	90 (32)	111 (44)
Mean maximum °F (°C)	79.0 (26.1)	83.3 (28.5)	88.2 (31.2)	93.5 (34.2)	97.7 (36.5)	99.7 (37.6)	103.1 (39.5)	103.0 (39.4)	98.8 (37.1)	93.1 (33.9)	84.3 (29.1)	79.2 (26.2)	105.2 (40.7)
Mean daily maximum °F (°C)	57.3 (14.1)	61.0 (16.1)	69.0 (20.6)	77.5 (25.3)	84.4 (29.1)	91.1 (32.8)	95.5 (35.3)	95.6 (35.3)	88.1 (31.2)	78.4 (25.8)	66.9 (19.4)	58.2 (14.6)	76.9 (24.9)
Daily mean °F (°C)	44.6 (7.0)	48.0 (8.9)	55.9 (13.3)	64.1 (17.8)	72.3 (22.4)	79.8 (26.6)	83.7 (28.7)	83.4 (28.6)	75.9 (24.4)	65.7 (18.7)	54.4 (12.4)	46.0 (7.8)	64.5 (18.1)
Mean daily minimum °F (°C)	32.0 (0.0)	35.1 (1.7)	42.7 (5.9)	50.7 (10.4)	60.1 (15.6)	68.5 (20.3)	71.9 (22.2)	71.3 (21.8)	63.8 (17.7)	53.0 (11.7)	41.9 (5.5)	33.8 (1.0)	52.1 (11.2)
Mean minimum °F (°C)	16.5 (−8.6)	19.6 (−6.9)	24.4 (−4.2)	33.8 (1.0)	45.0 (7.2)	57.6 (14.2)	65.2 (18.4)	62.3 (16.8)	49.2 (9.6)	34.9 (1.6)	24.8 (−4.0)	18.1 (−7.7)	12.7 (−10.7)
Record low °F (°C)	−2 (−19)	−7 (−22)	6 (−14)	25 (−4)	34 (1)	45 (7)	56 (13)	52 (11)	37 (3)	20 (−7)	16 (−9)	−8 (−22)	−8 (−22)
Average precipitation inches (mm)	1.20 (30)	1.77 (45)	2.23 (57)	2.08 (53)	3.89 (99)	3.66 (93)	2.36 (60)	2.42 (61)	2.92 (74)	2.87 (73)	2.15 (55)	1.43 (36)	28.98 (736)
Average snowfall inches (cm)	0.7 (1.8)	1.0 (2.5)	0.2 (0.51)	0.2 (0.51)	0.0 (0.0)	0.0 (0.0)	0.0 (0.0)	0.0 (0.0)	0.0 (0.0)	0.0 (0.0)	0.6 (1.5)	1.1 (2.8)	3.8 (9.7)
Average precipitation days (≥ 0.01 in)	4.3	4.6	5.3	4.9	7.5	6.2	4.6	5.6	5.2	5.4	4.5	4.3	62.4
Average snowy days (≥ 0.1 in)	0.5	0.8	0.1	0.1	0.0	0.0	0.0	0.0	0.0	0.0	0.3	0.5	2.3
Source: NOAA

== Demographics ==
Historical population
Census	Pop.	Note	%±
1930	601		—
1940	487		−19.0%
1950	289		−40.7%
1960	203		−29.8%
1970	134		−34.0%
1980	116		−13.4%
1990	103		−11.2%
2000	88		−14.6%
2010	94		6.8%
2020	63		−33.0%
U.S. Decennial Census

=== 2020 census ===
Putnam racial composition (NH = Non-Hispanic) (Note: Note: the US Census treats Hispanic/Latino as an ethnic category. This table excludes Latinos from the racial categories and assigns them to a separate category. Hispanics/Latinos can be of any race.)
Race	Number	Percentage
White (NH)	61	96.83%
Hispanic or Latino	2	3.17%
Total	63	

As of the 2020 United States census, there were 63 people, 41 households, and 26 families residing in the town.

=== 2000 census ===
As of the census of 2000, there were 88 people, 39 households, and 23 families residing in the town. The population density was 86.9 inhabitants per square mile (33.6/km^{2}). There were 56 housing units at an average density of 55.3 per square mile (21.4/km^{2}). The racial makeup of the town was 96.59% White, 1.14% Asian, 2.27% from other races. Hispanic or Latino of any race were 3.41% of the population.

There were 39 households, out of which 17.9% had children under the age of 18 living with them, 59.0% were married couples living together, 2.6% had a female householder with no husband present, and 38.5% were non-families. 33.3% of all households were made up of individuals, and 17.9% had someone living alone who was 65 years of age or older. The average household size was 2.26 and the average family size was 2.79.

In the town, the population was spread out, with 15.9% under the age of 18, 11.4% from 18 to 24, 22.7% from 25 to 44, 33.0% from 45 to 64, and 17.0% who were 65 years of age or older. The median age was 45 years. For every 100 females, there were 95.6 males. For every 100 females age 18 and over, there were 94.7 males.

The median income for a household in the town was $21,875, and the median income for a family was $31,250. Males had a median income of $35,833 versus $17,917 for females. The per capita income for the town was $13,562. There were 21.7% of families and 28.0% of the population living below the poverty line, including 33.3% of under eighteens and 15.0% of those over 64.

== Education ==
The town of Putnam is served by the Baird Independent School District.

== Notable people ==
- Larry L. King (1929 - 2012), author of The Best Little Whorehouse in Texas, born in Putnam
- Stan Williams (1929 - 2015), American football player
