= Belle Plain College =

College in Belle Plain, Texas, U.S.

Coordinates: 32.3089°N 99.3635°W

- Active: 1881–1892
- Location: Belle Plain, Texas

Belle Plain College, established in 1881, was a short-lived college located in the now defunct town of Belle Plain, Texas. The college was established by the Northwest Conference of the Methodist Church.

== History ==
John Day donated 10 acres (40,000 m^{2}) of land to the school, located in Belle Plain. In its beginnings local citizens donated generously to the institution. During its first year of existence, 1881–82, it operated in conjunction with the Belle Plain public school system. Franklin Wesley Chatfield served as Belle Plain College (BPC) president during most of its inaugural year. In the spring of 1882 the state awarded the college a charter and Rev. J.T.L. Annis served as president of the college for the next two years. During his tenure enrollment increased to 122.

Other presidents of the college include: John W. McIllhenny (1884–85), C. M. Virdel (1885-87), and I.M. Onins (1887–92).

== Curriculum and campus ==
From its inception the college boasted of its music program. By the end of the 1880s the school had fifteen pianos, a brass band and an orchestra. Though the campus comprised two buildings by 1885 the entire school had been mortgaged to pay for classroom furnishings and instruments. The school's only funding came from the local school district, a fact which hastened its demise.

Upon founding, the school a girl's dormitory was constructed. At the college's height over 300 people were enrolled and in 1885 a three-story stone structure was built at the site. The college had a military branch of its school in the small town of Belle Plain. The students there were required to wear blue and gray uniforms.

== The end of Belle Plain College ==
When the railroad bypassed Belle Plain in favor of Baird the latter quickly gained favor and became the county seat of Callahan County in 1883. Belle Plain's population began to decline as a result. Judge I.M. Onins took over the school and its debts in 1887. The bank foreclosed on the property in 1889, though they allowed it to operate until Onins' 1892 death. Today the ruins of the college buildings remain.
