= National Register of Historic Places listings in Callahan County, Texas =

Location of Callahan County in Texas

This is a list of the National Register of Historic Places listings in Callahan County, Texas.

This is intended to be a complete list of properties listed on the National Register of Historic Places in Callahan County, Texas. There are two properties listed on the National Register in the county. One site is also a Recorded Texas Historic Landmark.

This National Park Service list is complete through NPS recent listings posted March 21, 2025.

== Current listings ==
The locations of National Register properties may be seen in a mapping service provided.

	Name on the Register	Image	Date listed	Location	City or town	Description
1	Robert E. Howard House	Robert E. Howard House	August 19, 1994 (#94000984)	Jct. of TX 36 (Fourth St.) and Ave. J 32°07′17″N 99°10′19″W	Cross Plains	
2	Texas and Pacific Railway Depot	Texas and Pacific Railway Depot	April 10, 2012 (#12000194)	100 Market Street; 32°23′27″N 99°23′41″W	Baird	Recorded Texas Historic Landmark

== See also ==
- National Register of Historic Places listings in Texas
- Recorded Texas Historic Landmarks in Callahan County
