= Belle Plaine =

Belle Plaine may refer to a place in North America:

United States

- Belle Plaine, Iowa
- Belle Plaine, Kansas
- Belle Plaine, Minnesota
- Belle Plaine Township, Minnesota
- Belle Plaine (Madison County, Virginia), a historic farm property
- Belle Plaine, Wisconsin, a town
- Belle Plaine (community), Wisconsin, an unincorporated community

Canada

- Belle Plaine, Saskatchewan

== See also ==
- Belle Plain (disambiguation)
- Bell Plain Township, Marshall County, Illinois
