= Oplin, Texas =

- Unincorporated community
- Location within Texas Location within the United States
- Coordinates: 32°8′19″N 99°33′31″W
- Country: United States
- State: Texas
- County: Callahan
- Elevation: 1,988 ft (606 m)
- Time zone: UTC-6 (Central (CST))
  - Summer (DST): UTC-5 (CDT)
- Area code: 325
- GNIS feature ID: 1378806

Oplin is an unincorporated community in Callahan County in the U.S. state of Texas. According to the Handbook of Texas, the community had a population of 75 in 2000. It is located within the Abilene metropolitan area.

== History ==
The local Jot-um Down store formerly served as the community's bank.

== Geography ==
Oplin is located on Farm to Market Road 604 and County Road 202, 31 mi (50 km) southwest of Baird and 28 mi (45 km) southeast of Abilene in southwestern Callahan County. It is south of the Middle Fork of Pecan Bayou.

== Education ==
Oplin had its own school in 1940. The high school in the community dating from 1938 is now used as a local music venue. Today, the community is served by the Eula Independent School District.
