= Larry L. King =

American journalist (1929–2012)

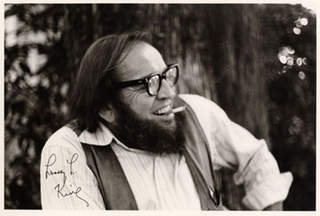
- King in 1976
- Born: Lawrence Leo King; January 1, 1929; Putnam, Texas, U.S.
- Died: December 20, 2012 (aged 83); Washington, D.C., U.S.
- Occupations: Playwright; Journalist; Novelist
- Writing career
- Language: English
- Period: 1964–2006
- Literary movement: New Journalism

Lawrence Leo King (January 1, 1929 – December 20, 2012) was an American playwright, journalist, and novelist, best remembered for his 1978 Tony Award-nominated play The Best Little Whorehouse in Texas, which became a long-running production on Broadway and was later turned into a feature film starring Burt Reynolds, Charles Durning, and Dolly Parton.

== Life and career ==
Lawrence Leo King was born on January 1, 1929, in Putnam, Texas, son of Clyde Clayton King, a farmer and blacksmith, and Cora Lee King (née Clark), who introduced him to the writings of Mark Twain. King dropped out of high school to join the Army. After his military service, and a year as a journalism major at Texas Tech, King worked as a sports and crime reporter for small newspapers in Texas and New Mexico. In 1954, King moved to Washington, D.C., where he worked as an aide to Texas Congressman J.T. Rutherford and subsequently to Jim Wright.

In 1964, King quit his Congressional job to concentrate on his writing, producing many magazine articles and fourteen books of both fiction and non-fiction, and became one of the leading figures in the "New Journalism". Many of his articles, covering a wide range of subjects including politics, sports, and music, were published in Harper's magazine, where his friend Willie Morris was editor-in-chief. His soul-searching Confessions of a White Racist was nominated for a National Book Award in 1972, and earned him praise from other writers, including Maya Angelou. In 1974, he wrote an article about the Chicken Ranch brothel in La Grange, Texas; after the article was published in Playboy, King and fellow Texan Peter Masterson developed it into the book of the Broadway musical.

King received an Emmy Award in 1982 for the CBS documentary The Best Little Statehouse in Texas. In 1988, Austin's Live Oak Theatre presented King's new drama The Night Hank Williams Died. The play went on to be produced Off-Broadway and around the nation. In 1989 it received the Helen Hayes Award for best new play, and King was awarded the Mary Goldwater Award from the Theatre Lobby Trust.

Beginning in 1987 and continuing until 2008, King donated his extensive personal archives to the Southwestern Writers Collection/The Wittliff Collections at Texas State University. In 2006, a 70-seat performance space dedicated to producing new works by local and national authors at the Austin Playhouse in Austin, Texas, was renamed the Larry L. King Theatre.

King died on December 20, 2012, at a retirement home in Washington, D.C. He was survived by his third wife, Barbara S. Blaine (who was also his lawyer and literary agent), five children, two grandchildren, and three great-grandchildren.
