= Atwell, Texas =

- Unincorporated community
- Location within Texas Location within the United States
- Coordinates: 32°15′40″N 99°8′3″W
- Country: United States
- State: Texas
- County: Callahan
- Elevation: 1,821 ft (555 m)
- Time zone: UTC-6 (Central (CST))
  - Summer (DST): UTC-5 (CDT)
- Area code: 325
- GNIS feature ID: 1377960

Atwell is an unincorporated community in Callahan County, in the U.S. state of Texas. According to the Handbook of Texas, only eight people lived in the community in 2000. It is located within the Abilene metropolitan area.

== Geography ==
Atwell is located in eastern Callahan County.

== Education ==
A school was established in Atwell around 1886 and was named Bell Branch, then Flag Springs. Today, the community is served by the Cross Plains Independent School District.
