= Clyde, Texas =

- City
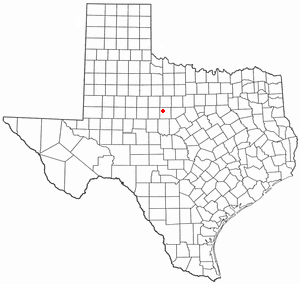
- Location of Clyde, Texas

- Coordinates: 32°24′12″N 99°29′52″W
- Country: United States
- State: Texas
- County: Callahan

Area
  - Total: 3.28 sq mi (8.50 km^{2})
  - Land: 3.28 sq mi (8.50 km^{2})
  - Water: 0 sq mi (0.00 km^{2})
- Elevation: 2,008 ft (612 m)

Population (2020)
  - Total: 3,811
  - Density: 1,160/sq mi (448/km^{2})
- Time zone: UTC-6 (Central (CST))
  - Summer (DST): UTC-5 (CDT)
- ZIP code: 79510
- Area code: 325
- FIPS code: 48-15676
- GNIS feature ID: 2409491
- Website: clyde-tx.gov

Clyde is a city in Callahan County, Texas, United States. The population was 3,811 at the 2020 census. It is part of the Abilene metropolitan statistical area. As of 2023 the population of Clyde has grown to 4,157.

== Geography ==
Clyde is located in northwestern Callahan County. Interstate 20 passes through the northern side of the city, leading east 6 miles (10 km) to Baird, the county seat, and west 14 miles (23 km) to Abilene.

According to the United States Census Bureau, the city has a total area of 3.3 square miles (8.5 km^{2}), all land.

== History ==
(source to be formatted,by city govt here.this text below was plagiarized) https://www.clyde-tx.gov/clyde-edc

The first settlers came to Clyde around 1876. Mr. Shephard built a log cabin, the first residence, around this time. Many others soon followed. Among the first settlers were people such as R. J. Estes who came all the way from Fort Worth. When he first came, he didn't plan on staying. Mrs. Estes and he had stopped only to rest, but soon decided to stay. In their quick decision to stay, they simply left their belongings under a tree while they traveled to get the rest of their belongings for their new home. All their belongings were still as they had left them when they returned a few months later.

The railroad was prominent in Clyde. It started with only a boxcar, then later a station was added. Along with the railroad came more settlers, homes, and work. Soon a school was needed.

The actual origin of the name "Clyde" is not known. Many believe it was named after a crew foreman. The man worked for the Texas and Pacific Railway Company. The company had a tent for the employees to get supplies. They would say, "Let's go up to Clyde's," not talking about the town, only the supply tent. Soon the railroad company would call their boxcar location "Clyde".

The first post office soon followed. The first postmaster, Jesse L. Miller, was appointed June 27, 1881.

== Demographics ==
Historical population
Census	Pop.	Note	%±
1910	495		—
1920	610		23.2%
1930	706		15.7%
1940	800		13.3%
1950	908		13.5%
1960	1,116		22.9%
1970	1,635		46.5%
1980	2,562		56.7%
1990	3,002		17.2%
2000	3,345		11.4%
2010	3,713		11.0%
2020	3,811		2.6%
U.S. Decennial Census

=== 2020 census ===
As of the 2020 census, Clyde had a population of 3,811. The median age was 38.9 years. 24.9% of residents were under the age of 18 and 18.7% of residents were 65 years of age or older. For every 100 females there were 94.7 males, and for every 100 females age 18 and over there were 91.8 males age 18 and over.

0% of residents lived in urban areas, while 100.0% lived in rural areas.

There were 1,485 households in Clyde, of which 34.0% had children under the age of 18 living in them. Of all households, 50.6% were married-couple households, 17.2% were households with a male householder and no spouse or partner present, and 26.6% were households with a female householder and no spouse or partner present. About 25.2% of all households were made up of individuals and 13.5% had someone living alone who was 65 years of age or older.

There were 1,646 housing units, of which 9.8% were vacant. Among occupied housing units, 71.8% were owner-occupied and 28.2% were renter-occupied. The homeowner vacancy rate was 2.2% and the rental vacancy rate was 7.9%.

Racial composition as of the 2020 census
Race	Number	Percent
White	3110	88.4%
Black or African American	1	0.8%
American Indian and Alaska Native	0	0.8%
Asian	0	0.3%
Native Hawaiian and Other Pacific Islander	0	0.1%
Some other race	0	2.6%
Two or more races	0	7.1%
Hispanic or Latino (of any race)	0	10.6%

=== 2000 census ===
As of the census of 2000, there were 3,345 people, 1,292 households, and 989 families residing in the city. The population density was 1,401.0 inhabitants per square mile (540.9/km^{2}). There were 1,410 housing units at an average density of 590.6 per square mile (228.0/km^{2}). The racial makeup of the city was 96.29% White, 0.36% African American, 0.39% Native American, 0.18% Asian, 0.12% Pacific Islander, 1.58% from other races, and 1.08% from two or more races. Hispanic or Latino of any race were 4.04% of the population.

There were 1,292 households, out of which 36.5% had children under the age of 18 living with them, 60.2% were married couples living together, 13.9% had a female householder with no husband present, and 23.4% were non-families. 22.0% of all households were made up of individuals, and 12.5% had someone living alone who was 65 years of age or older. The average household size was 2.56 and the average family size was 2.96.

In the city, the population was spread out, with 28.7% under the age of 18, 6.8% from 18 to 24, 25.0% from 25 to 44, 21.8% from 45 to 64, and 17.7% who were 65 years of age or older. The median age was 37 years. For every 100 females, there were 86.6 males. For every 100 females age 18 and over, there were 82.5 males.

The median income for a household in the city was $33,085, and the median income for a family was $37,257. Males had a median income of $27,426 versus $22,188 for females. The per capita income for the city was $15,699. About 5.3% of families and 8.0% of the population were below the poverty line, including 8.6% of those under age 18 and 6.3% of those age 65 or over.

== Education ==
The City of Clyde is served by the Clyde Consolidated Independent School District and home to the Clyde High School Bulldogs. In 2008, the football team won the first district championship in over 50 years. The high school is known throughout the region as the Mighty Bulldog Band and has been the area A 3A champions for marching in 2017, 2021, 2022, and 2024. The Mighty Bulldog Band has appeared at the Texas State UIL marching contest finishing 20th place in 2017, again in 2019 finishing 16th place, again in 2021 finishing 17th place, and again in 2023 finishing in 14th place. The band has gone back in 2024 finishing in 13th place and recently in 2025 finishing 11th place.
