= Clyde Consolidated Independent School District =

School district in Texas, United States

Clyde Consolidated Independent School District is a public school district based in Clyde, Texas (US).

Located in Callahan County, portions of the district extend into Shackelford, Jones, and Taylor counties.

In 2009, the school district was rated "academically acceptable" by the Texas Education Agency.

== Schools ==
- Clyde High School (Grades 9-12)
- Clyde Junior High (Grades 6-8)
- Clyde Intermediate (Grades 3-5)
- Clyde Elementary (Grades PK-2)
