= Clyde High School (Texas) =

Location
- 500 Hays Road; Clyde, Texas 79510; United States; 32.4153°N 99.5271°W

Information
- School type: Public high school
- School district: Clyde Consolidated Independent School District
- Superintendent: Kenneth Berry
- Teaching staff: 39.15 (FTE)
- Grades: 9-12
- Enrollment: 442 (2023–2024)
- Student to teacher ratio: 11.29
- Colors: Black & gold
- Athletics conference: UIL Class 3A
- Mascot: Bulldog
- Yearbook: Kennel
- Website: www.clydeisd.org/page/04.home

Clyde High School is a public high school located in Clyde, Texas, United States and classified as a 3A school by the UIL. It is part of the Clyde Consolidated Independent School District located in central Callahan County. For the 2024-2025 school year, the school was given an "A" by the Texas Education Agency.

== Athletics ==
The Clyde Bulldogs compete in these sports -

- Baseball
- Basketball
- Cross country
- Football
- Golf
- Powerlifting
- Softball
- Tennis
- Track and field
- Volleyball

=== State titles ===
- Girls Cross Country -
  - 1979(B)
- Boys Track -
  - 1951(B)
- Girls Track -
  - 1980(2A)
- One Act Play -
  - 1963(1A), 1982(3A), 1983(3A)

== Controversy ==
On December 5, 2020 an openly gay male student was given in-school-suspension for wearing nail polish, subsequently sparking widespread criticism, with many calling the school's dress code policies sexist and homophobic.
