= Baird Independent School District =

School district in Texas

Location
- 600 W 7th St. Baird, Texas ESC Region 14 USA
- Coordinates: 32°23′54″N 99°23′59″W

District information
- Type: Independent school district
- Grades: Pre-K through 12
- Superintendent: Jarod Bellar
- Schools: 3 (2009-10)
- NCES District ID: 4809280

Students and staff
- Students: 295 (2010-11)
- Teachers: 34.75 (2009-10) (on full-time equivalent (FTE) basis)
- Student–teacher ratio: 9.47 (2009-10)
- Athletic conference: UIL Class 1A Football Division II
- District mascot: Bears
- Colors: Red, White

Other information
- TEA District Accountability Rating for 2011-12: Academically Acceptable
- Website: Baird ISD

Baird Independent School District is a public school district based in Baird, Texas (USA). In addition to Baird, the district also serves the town of Putnam. The district operates one high school, Baird High School.

== Finances ==
As of the 2010–2011 school year, the appraised valuation of property in the district was $111,051,000. The maintenance tax rate was $0.117 and the bond tax rate was $0.007 per $100 of appraised valuation.

== Academic achievement ==
In 2011, the school district was rated "academically acceptable" by the Texas Education Agency. Forty-nine percent of districts in Texas in 2011 received the same rating. No state accountability ratings will be given to districts in 2012. A school district in Texas can receive one of four possible rankings from the Texas Education Agency: Exemplary (the highest possible ranking), Recognized, Academically Acceptable, and Academically Unacceptable (the lowest possible ranking).

Historical district TEA accountability ratings

- 2011: Academically Acceptable
- 2010: Recognized
- 2009: Recognized
- 2008: Recognized
- 2007: Academically Acceptable
- 2006: Recognized
- 2005: Academically Acceptable
- 2004: Academically Acceptable

== Schools ==
As of the 2011–2012 school year, Baird ISD had three schools.

- Baird High School (Grades 9-12)
- Baird Middle (Grades 6-8)
- Baird Elementary (Grades PK-5)

== Special programs ==
=== Athletics ===
Baird High School participates in the boys sports of baseball, basketball, and football. The school participates in the girls sports of basketball and softball. For the 2012 through 2014 school years, Baird High School will play football in UIL Class 1A Division II.

== See also ==
- List of school districts in Texas
- List of high schools in Texas
