= Admiral, Texas =

Ghost town in Texas, US

- Ghost town
- Location within Texas
- Coordinates: 32.2965198°N 99.2978494°W
- Country: United States
- State: Texas
- County: Callahan
- Elevation: 1,650 ft (503 m)

Admiral is a ghost town in Callahan County, Texas, United States. Established in the late 1890s, a post office operated from 1897 to 1929. A farming community, it had a population at its peak in 1900. From the 1930s, the community declined, being abandoned by 1989.
