= Stan Williams (gridiron football) =

American gridiron football player (1929–2015)

No. 80, 74
- Positions: End, defensive back

Personal information
- Born: December 5, 1929; Putnam, Texas, U.S.
- Died: September 13, 2015 (aged 85); Texas, U.S.
- Listed height: 6 ft 2 in (1.88 m)
- Listed weight: 195 lb (88 kg)

Career information
- High school: Cisco (Cisco, Texas)
- College: Baylor (1949–1951)
- NFL draft: 1952: 8th round, 86th overall pick

Career history
- Dallas Texans (1952); Saskatchewan Roughriders (1953–1957)

Awards and highlights
- First-team All-American (1951); First-team All-SWC (1951)

Career NFL statistics
- Interceptions: 5
- Receptions: 9
- Receiving yards: 123
- Total touchdowns: 1
- Stats at Pro Football Reference

Stanley Neil Williams (December 5, 1929 – September 13, 2015) was an American professional football player. He was a first-team All-American end at Baylor University in 1951 and played for the Dallas Texans in 1952.

Williams was born in Putnam, Texas, and lived in Cisco, Texas. His father, Roy Lee Williams, was a farmer in Cisco. After attending Cisco High School, Williams enrolled at Baylor University in Waco, Texas. He played college football at the end position for the Baylor Bears football team from 1949 to 1951. He caught 65 passes for 1,029 yards and 11 touchdowns in his career at Baylor. He was selected by the Football Writers Association of America as a first-team offensive player on its 1951 College Football All-America Teams.

Williams was drafted by the Dallas Texans in the eighth round (86th overall pick) of the 1952 NFL draft and played for the Texans as an end and defensive back during the 1952 NFL season. In 12 NFL games, he caught nine passes for 123 yards and intercepted five additional passes for 84 yards. He also recovered five fumbles for 42 yards and a touchdown. Williams later moved north to play for the Saskatchewan Roughriders of the Western Interprovincial Football Union. Williams played five seasons in Regina tallying 124 receptions for 2,055 yards and 11 touchdowns, as well as making 15 interceptions. He was added to Saskatchewan's Plaza of Honour in 1966.

Williams was inducted into the Texas Sports Hall of Fame in 2004.
