= Lone Star Wind Farm =

Wind farm in Texas, United States

- Country: United States
- Coordinates: 32°16′22.12″N 99°27′22″W

Power generation
- Units operational: 200
- Nameplate capacity: 400 MW

The Lone Star Wind Farm in Shackelford and Callahan Counties in Texas was officially opened by EDP Renewables North America in June 2008, with an installed generating capacity of 400 MW. The site's 200 Gamesa 2 MW wind turbines produce enough electricity for at least 120,000 homes, with environmental benefits claimed to be equivalent to taking about 90,000 cars off the road.

== Location ==
The Lone Star Wind Farm is located about 15 miles northeast of the city of Abilene. The wind farm is separated into two sites, or phases, with Phase I to the north that consists of 100 Gamesa G87 wind turbines and Phase II to the south also consisting of 100 Gamesa G87 wind turbines.

=== Land use ===
Lone Star Wind Farm leases the land where the turbines sit and according to EDP Renewables North America from 2008-2019 has paid local landowners $24.9 million. In addition to the long-term lease agreements, Lone Star Wind Farm also has easement agreements which allowed for the construction of access roads and transmission corridors. The land surrounding the turbines is mainly used for ranching, oil extraction, as well as gas extraction.

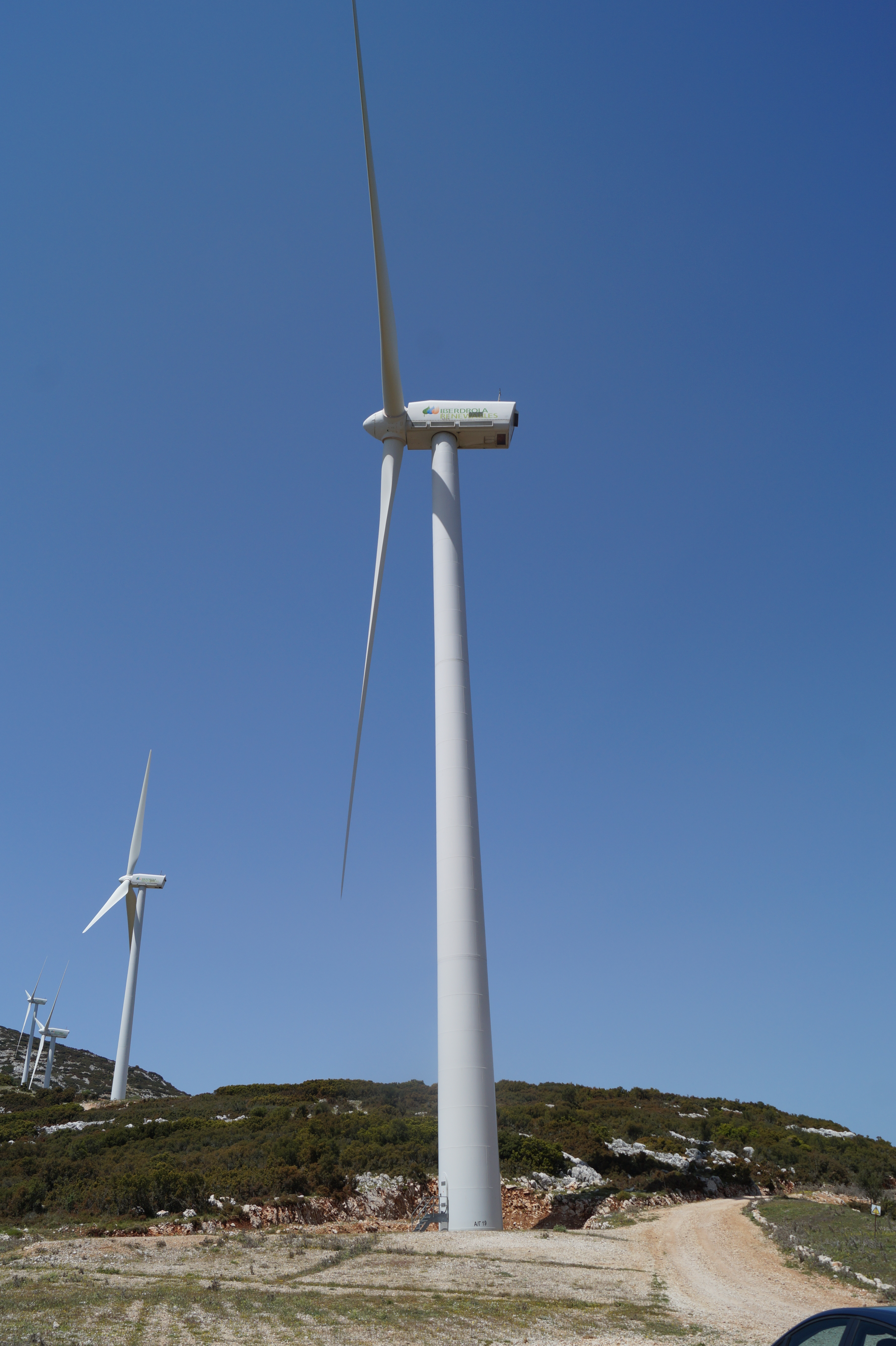
A Gamesa G87/2000 wind turbine in Arachnaio II, Greece. This is the same model of turbines used at Lone Star Wind Farm.

== Environmental impact ==
According to a facts sheet put out in 2021 by EDP Renewables North America, the Lone Star Wind Farm saves more than 711 million gallons of water each year. However in the fine print of the facts sheet it is stated that this number is calculated by using the assumption that more conventional forms of generated electricity use up 0.58 gallons for every kilowatt-hour(kWh) that is produced. The 0.58 gallon/kWh statistic is taken from a study published by the Argonne National Laboratory's Energy System Division in 2016, entitled Water Consumption Factors for Electricity Generation in the United States by authors Uisung Lee, Jeongwoo Han, and Amgad Elgowainy.
