= Robert E. Howard Museum =

Historic house in Texas, United States

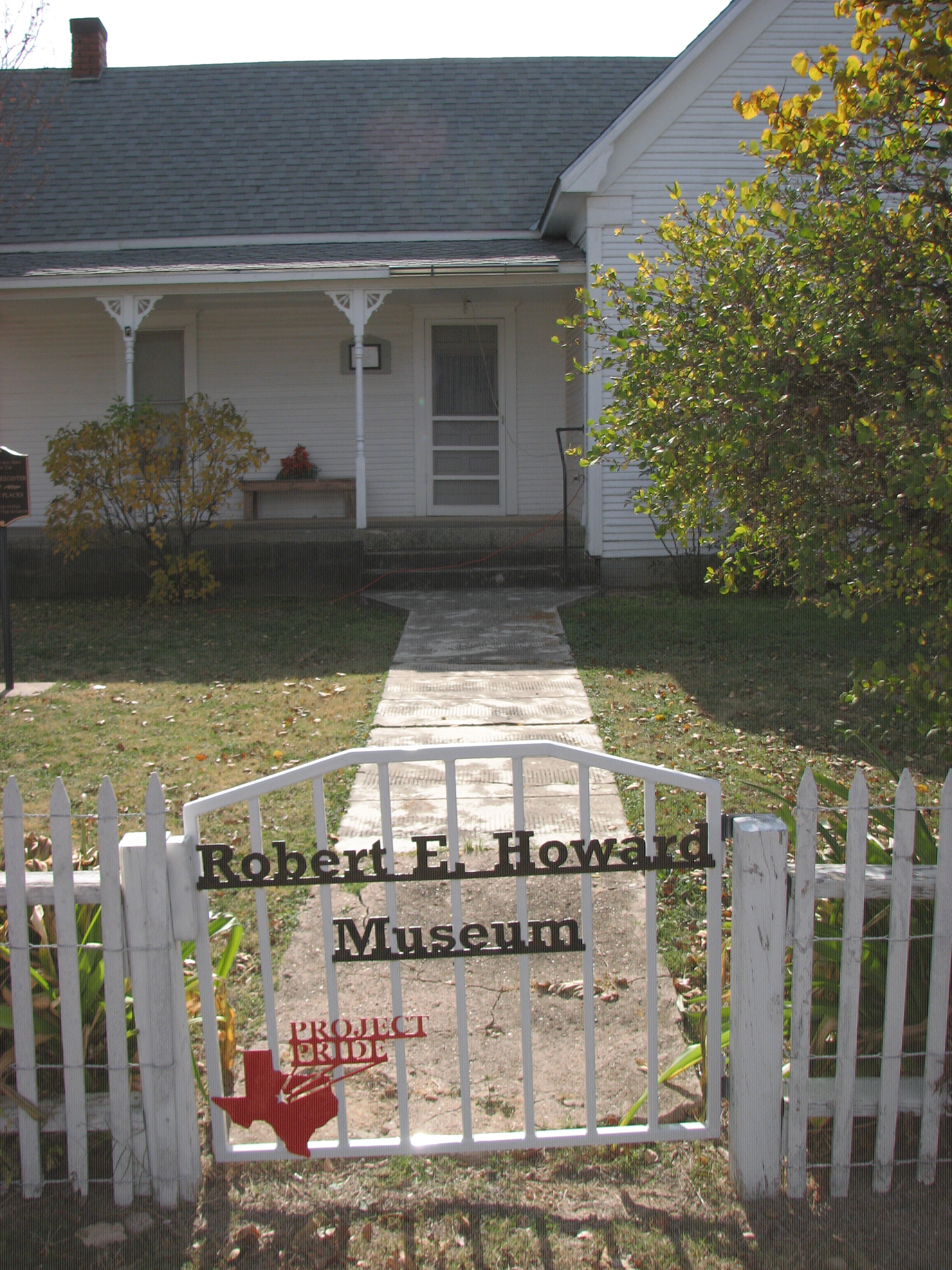
- Front gate of Howard Museum
- Established: 1919
- Location: Jct Fourth St (SH 36) and Ave. J Cross Plains, Texas
- Coordinates: 32°7′16″N 99°10′18″W
- Type: House museum
- Website: The Robert E. Howard Foundation
- Robert E. Howard House
- U.S. National Register of Historic Places
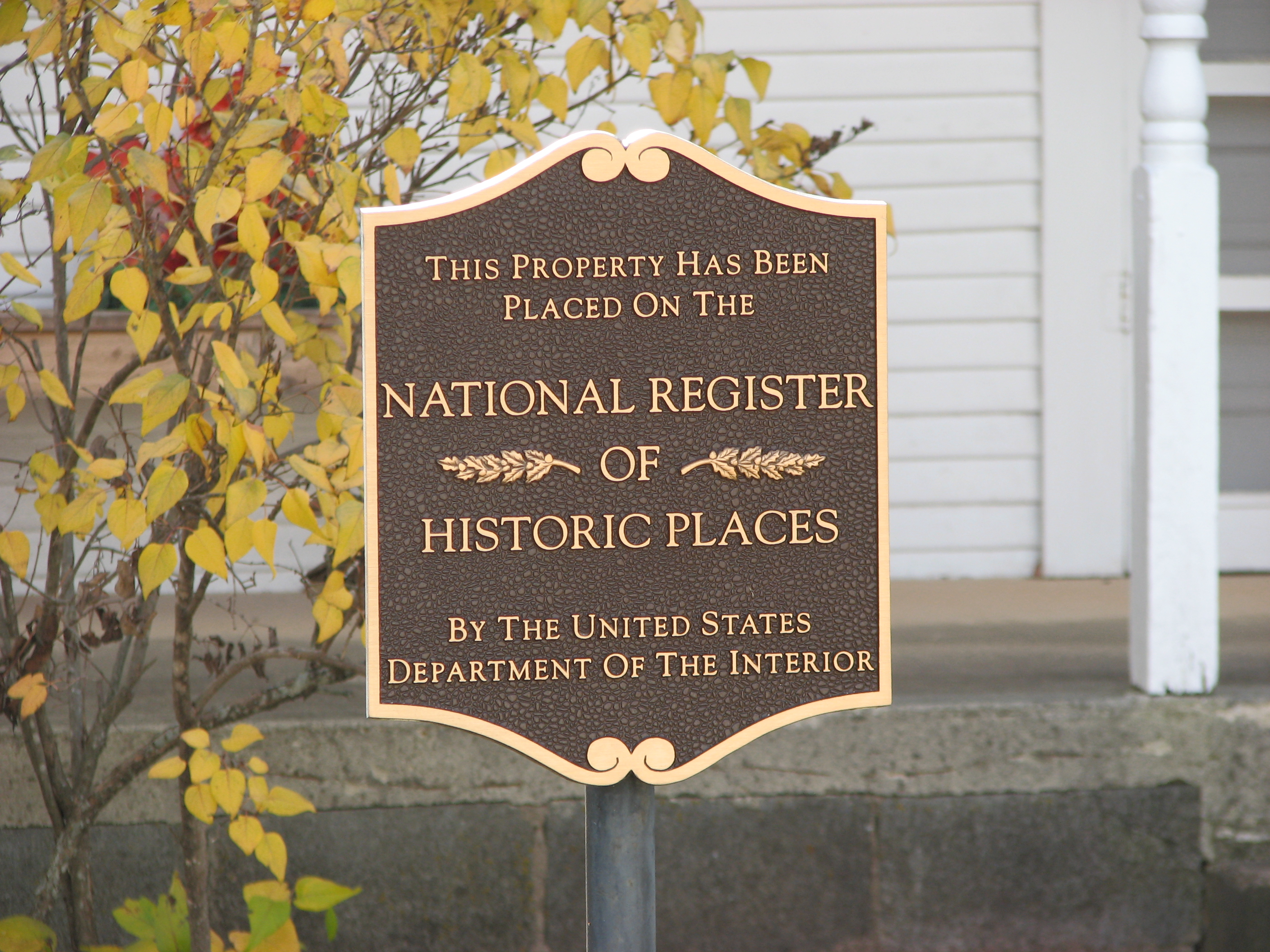
- National Register plaque

- Location within Texas Location within the United States
- Area: less than one acre
- NRHP reference No.: 94000984
- Added to NRHP: August 19, 1994

The Robert E. Howard Museum is located at the junction of Texas State Highway 36 and Avenue J in Cross Plains, in the county of Callahan, in the U.S. state of Texas. The museum was the family home of author Robert E. Howard, creator of Conan the Barbarian, Solomon Kane, Kull of Atlantis, Sailor Steve Costigan, and others. Howard was notable for his contributions to Weird Tales and other magazines as well as his close collaborations and friendship with famous author and editor H. P. Lovecraft. His work is considered critical to Working-Class Literature and the preservation of American Folk-tales, especially in relation to Texan literature and regional Tall Tale methods. The structure was added to the National Register of Historic Places listings in Callahan County, Texas in 1994.

== History ==
The T-shaped white frame home was built c.1919, by Mr. and Mrs. J.M.Coffman. Dr. Isaac M. Howard and his wife Hester Ervin Howard bought it shortly thereafter and moved in with their son, Robert. The sun porch was converted into a bedroom for their son, and a new porch and bathroom were built onto the home by Dr. Howard. in 1936, Robert E. Howard committed suicide in his 1935 Chevrolet sedan in the driveway using a .380 Browning pistol. His father later sold the house in 1944 to Mrs. Nancy Elizabeth Grisham.

== Museum ==
The Robert E. Howard Press Association and the non-profit Robert E. Howard Foundation sponsor an annual event in June to celebrate the author's legacy. Many of the local businesses are involved in the annual Robert E. Howard Days event. The local library extends its hours during the event to showcase their collection of original typescripts and first editions. The Cross Plains Review, where Howard once worked, also operates their own gift-shop and showcases some of his original belongings. Also involved is the local post office, which provides their specialized cancellation stamps in honor of the late author. The museum is filled with things like Howard's father's bible, a bust of Cleopatra that Howard purchased, books he owned, original manuscripts, data about his writing income, correspondence with HP Lovecraft, bibliographies, maps of the fictional land of Cimmeria, movie posters, pictures of Howard's family and friends, pictures of Cross Plains, various reprintings of his stories, poetry compilations, and personal documents like his canceled checks.

== Hours, admission ==
Admission is free only by pre-arrangement or during the Howard Days annual event.

== In popular culture ==
In American author Joe R. Lansdale's novel Petrified Dreams—the final novel in his Hap and Leonard series—the characters visit the Robert E. Howard Museum while awaiting the novel's violent conclusion in rural Texas.

== See also ==
- List of museums in West Texas
- National Register of Historic Places listings in Callahan County, Texas
