= Pueblo, Texas =

- Unincorporated community
- Location within Texas Location within the United States
- Coordinates: 32°29′56″N 99°7′17″W
- Country: United States
- State: Texas
- County: Callahan
- Elevation: 1,427 ft (435 m)
- Time zone: UTC-6 (Central (CST))
  - Summer (DST): UTC-5 (CDT)
- Area code: 325
- GNIS feature ID: 2034984

Pueblo is an unincorporated community in Callahan County, in the U.S. state of Texas. According to the Handbook of Texas, the community had a population of 46 in 2000. It is located within the Abilene metropolitan area.

== Geography ==
Pueblo is located on the Eastland County line in northeastern Callahan County.

== Education ==
Pueblo had its own school in 1948. Today, the community is served by the Moran Independent School District.
