= Belle Plaine (Madison County, Virginia) =

Historic house in Virginia, United States

- U.S. National Register of Historic Places
- U.S. Historic district
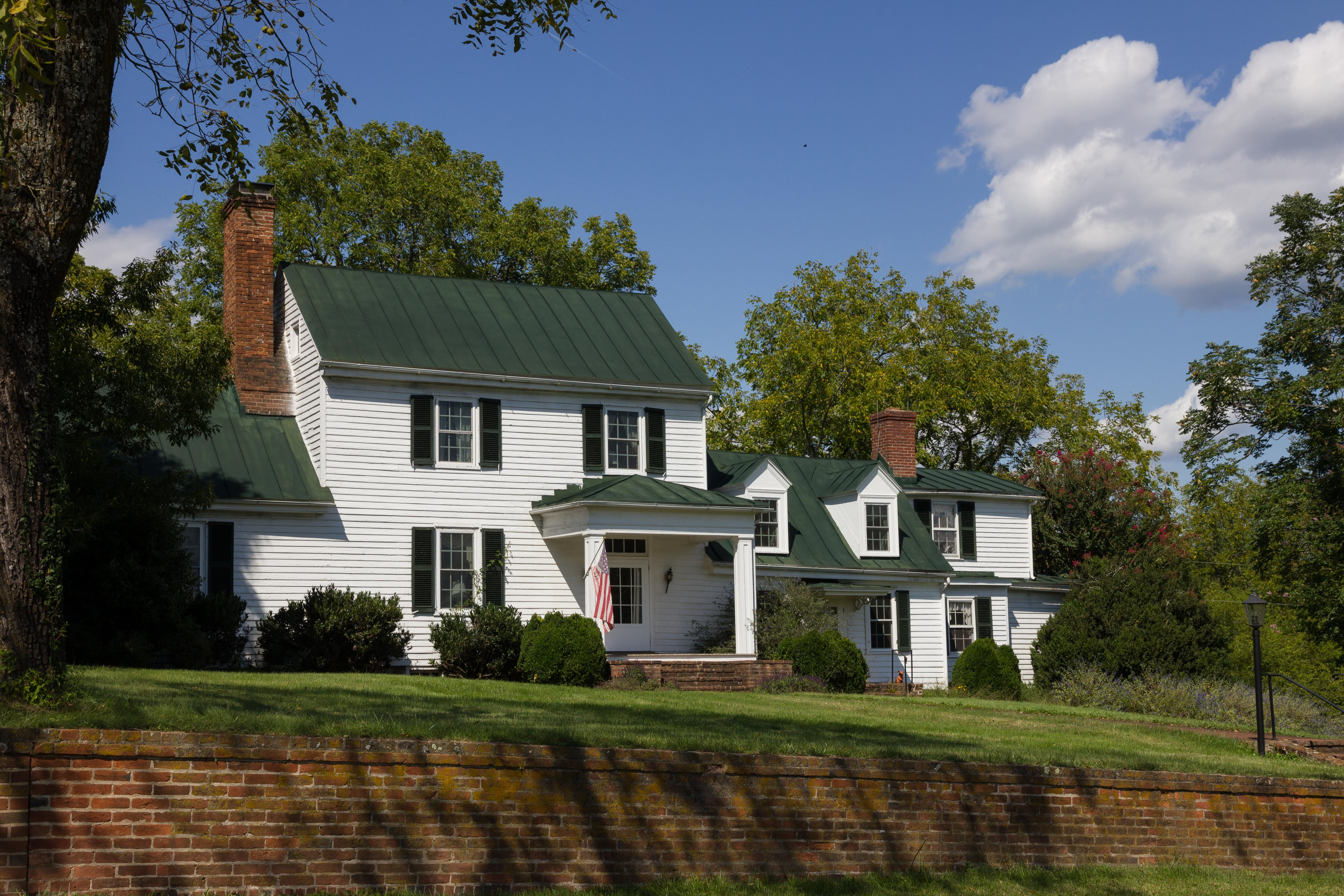

- Location within Virginia Location within the United States
- Location: 2488 S. U.S. Route 15
- Coordinates: 38°19′1″N 78°07′13″W
- Area: 212 acres (86 ha)
- Built: c. 1760
- Architectural style: Federal, Greek Revival
- NRHP reference No.: 16000532)
- Added to NRHP: August 15, 2016

Belle Plaine is a historic farm property at 2488 South United States Route 15 in rural Madison County, Virginia, south of Locust Dale. The main farmhouse is a five-bay two-story frame structure attached to a somewhat older log structure, finished like the main block in wooden clapboards. The log portion is believed to be one of the oldest surviving structures in the county. The property illustrates the changing trends of agricultural use over more than two centuries.

It was listed on the National Register of Historic Places in 2016.
