= Rowden, Texas =

- Unincorporated community
- Location within Texas Location within the United States
- Coordinates: 32°12′14″N 99°20′38″W
- Country: United States
- State: Texas
- County: Callahan
- Elevation: 1,880 ft (570 m)
- Time zone: UTC-6 (Central (CST))
  - Summer (DST): UTC-5 (CDT)
- Area code: 325
- GNIS feature ID: 1378991

Rowden is an unincorporated community in Callahan County, in the U.S. state of Texas. According to the Handbook of Texas, the community had a population of 30 in 2000. It is located within the Abilene metropolitan area.

== Education ==
Today, the community is served by the Cross Plains Independent School District.
