= Callahan County, Texas =

County in Texas, United States

- County
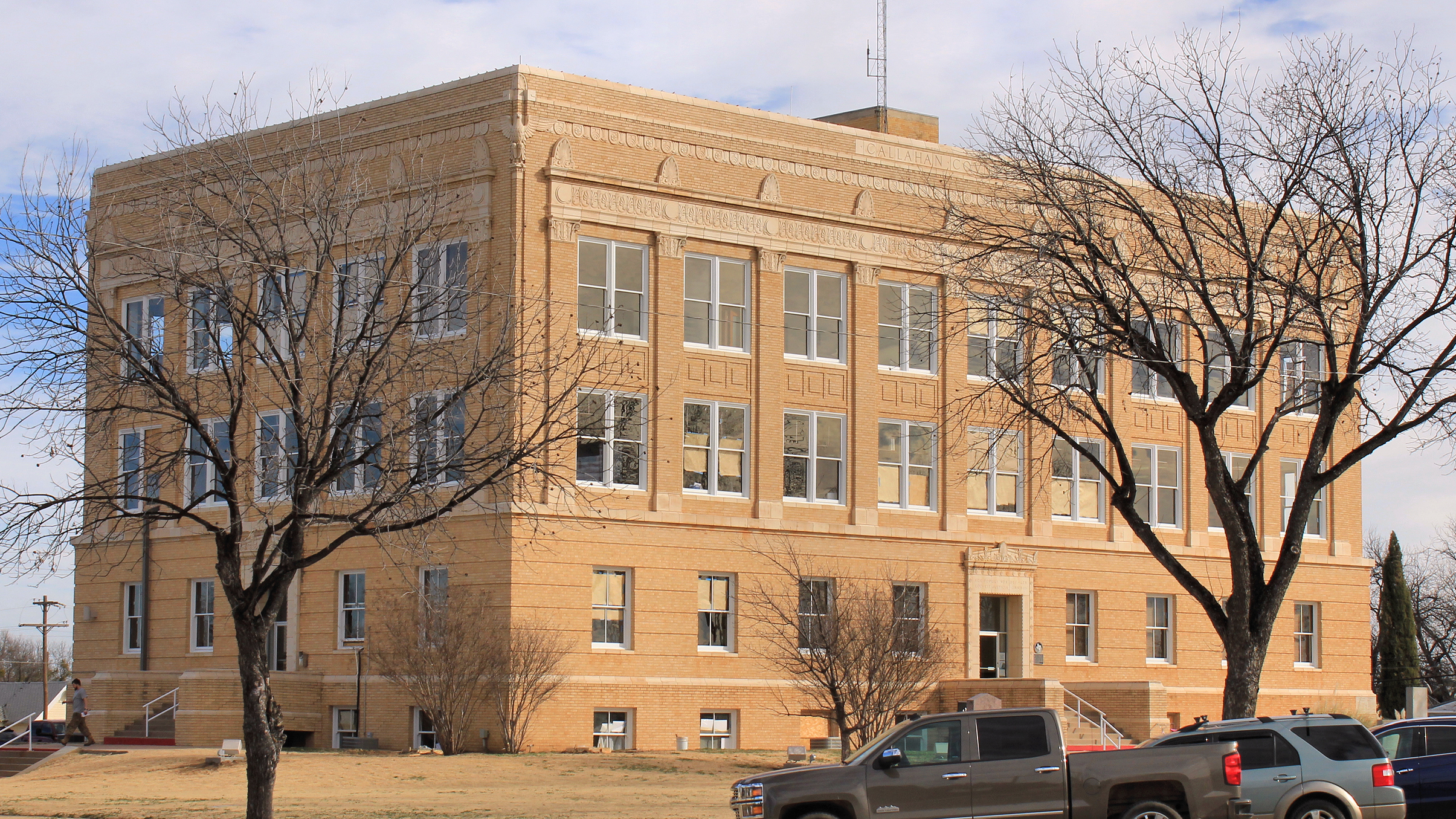
- Callahan County Courthouse in Baird

- Location within the U.S. state of Texas
- Coordinates: 32°17′N 99°22′W
- Country: United States
- State: Texas
- Founded: 1877
- Seat: Baird
- Largest city: Clyde

Area
  - Total: 901.3 sq mi (2,334 km^{2})
  - Land: 899.4 sq mi (2,329 km^{2})
  - Water: 1.9 sq mi (4.9 km^{2}) 0.2%

Population (2020)
  - Total: 13,708
  - Estimate (2025): 14,491 ▲
  - Density: 15.24/sq mi (5.885/km^{2})
- Time zone: UTC−6 (Central)
  - Summer (DST): UTC−5 (CDT)
- Congressional districts: 19th, 25th
- Website: www.callahancounty.org

Callahan County is a county located in the U.S. state of Texas. As of the 2020 census, the population was 13,708. Its county seat is Baird. The county was founded in 1858 and later organized in 1877. It is named for James Hughes Callahan, an American soldier in the Texas Revolution. Callahan County is included in the Abilene metropolitan area.

== Geography ==
According to the U.S. Census Bureau, the county has a total area of 901 square miles (2,330 km^{2}), of which 1.9 sq mi (4.9 km^{2}) (0.2%) are covered by water.

Callahan Divide is range of hills that extends 26 miles (42 km) from west to southeast through Taylor and Callahan Counties, with highest elevation 2,411 ft (735 m), which together with other elevated areas in the two counties provide advantages in wind energy.

=== Major highways ===
- Interstate 20
  - I-20 BL (Baird)
- U.S. Highway 283
- State Highway 36
- State Highway 206
- State Highway 279
- State Highway 351

=== Adjacent counties ===
- Shackelford County (north)
- Eastland County (east)
- Brown County (southeast)
- Coleman County (south)
- Taylor County (west)
- Jones County (northwest)

== Demographics ==
Historical population
Census	Pop.	Note	%±
1880	3,453		—
1890	5,457		58.0%
1900	8,768		60.7%
1910	12,973		48.0%
1920	11,844		−8.7%
1930	12,785		7.9%
1940	11,568		−9.5%
1950	9,087		−21.4%
1960	7,929		−12.7%
1970	8,205		3.5%
1980	10,992		34.0%
1990	11,859		7.9%
2000	12,905		8.8%
2010	13,544		5.0%
2020	13,708		1.2%
2025 (est.)	14,491	▲	5.7%
U.S. Decennial Census; 1850–2010 2010 2020

=== Racial and ethnic composition ===
Callahan County, Texas – Racial and ethnic composition Note: the US Census treats Hispanic/Latino as an ethnic category. This table excludes Latinos from the racial categories and assigns them to a separate category. Hispanics/Latinos may be of any race.
Race / Ethnicity (NH = Non-Hispanic)	Pop 1980	Pop 1990	Pop 2000	Pop 2010	Pop 2020	% 1980	% 1990	% 2000	% 2010	% 2020
White alone (NH)	10,543	11,289	11,822	12,065	11,555	95.92%	95.19%	91.61%	89.08%	84.29%
Black or African American alone (NH)	4	2	27	135	118	0.04%	0.02%	0.21%	1.00%	0.86%
Native American or Alaska Native alone (NH)	21	44	62	61	66	0.19%	0.37%	0.48%	0.45%	0.48%
Asian alone (NH)	50	33	34	56	52	0.45%	0.28%	0.26%	0.41%	0.38%
Native Hawaiian or Pacific Islander alone (NH)	x	x	7	7	7	x	x	0.05%	0.05%	0.05%
Other race alone (NH)	3	2	18	10	50	0.03%	0.02%	0.14%	0.07%	0.36%
Mixed race or Multiracial (NH)	x	x	123	185	554	x	x	0.95%	1.37%	4.04%
Hispanic or Latino (any race)	371	489	812	1,025	1,306	3.38%	4.12%	6.29%	7.57%	9.53%
Total	10,992	11,859	12,905	13,544	13,708	100.00%	100.00%	100.00%	100.00%	100.00%

=== 2020 census ===
As of the 2020 census, the county had a population of 13,708. The median age was 44.3 years; 22.0% of residents were under 18 and 22.0% were 65 or older. For every 100 females, there were 98.8 males, and for every 100 females 18 and over, there were 96.4 males 18 and over.

The racial makeup of the county was 88.7% White, 1.0% Black or African American, 0.6% American Indian and Alaska Native, 0.4% Asian, 0.1% Native Hawaiian and Pacific Islander, 2.6% from some other race, and 6.8% from two or more races. Hispanic or Latino residents of any race comprised 9.5% of the population.

About 0.1% of residents lived in urban areas, while the rest lived in rural areas.

Of the 5,582 households in the county, 28.3% had children under 18 living in them, 52.7% were married-couple households, 18.9% were households with a male householder and no spouse or partner present, and 23.2% were households with a female householder and no spouse or partner present. About 26.8% of all households were made up of individuals, and 13.3% had someone living alone who was 65 or older.

The county had 6,487 housing units, of which 14.0% were vacant. Among occupied housing units, 79.0% were owner-occupied and 21.0% were renter-occupied. The homeowner vacancy rate was 2.1% and the rental vacancy rate was 10.3%.

=== 2010 census ===
In the 2010 United States census, Callahan County had 13,544 people. Among non-Hispanics, this included 12,065 Whites (89.1%), 135 Blacks (1.0%), 56 Asians (0.4%), 61 Native Americans, seven Pacific Islanders, 10 from some other race, and 185 from two or more races. The Hispanic or Latino population included 1,025 people (7.6%).

Of the 5,447 households, 27.1% had children under 18 living with them, 57.0% were married couples living together, 5.2% had a female householder with children and no husband present, and 28.5% were not families. About 24.7% of households were one person and 32.3% had someone who was 65 or older.

The age distribution was 76.2% over 18 and 18.2% 65 or older. The median age was 43.0 years. The gender ratio was 48.8% male and 51.2% female. Among 5,447 occupied households, 78.7% were owner-occupied and 21.3% were renter-occupied.

=== 2000 census ===
At the 2000 census, 12,905 people, 5,061 households, and 3,750 families were in the county. The population density was 14 people per square mile (5.4 people/km^{2}). The 5,925 housing units averaged 7 units per square mile (2.7 units/km^{2}). The racial makeup of the county was 94.78% White, 0.22% Black or African American, 0.63% Native American, 0.26% Asian, 0.05% Pacific Islander, 2.70% from other races, and 1.35% from two or more races. 6.29% of the population were Hispanic or Latino of any race. Of the 5,061 households, 31.90% had children under the age of 18 living with them, 61.60% were married couples living together, 9.30% had a female householder with no husband present, and 25.90% were not families. About 23.30% of households were one person, and 12.20% were one person aged 65 or older. The average household size was 2.53, and the average family size was 2.97.

The age distribution was 26.20% under 18, 6.60% from 18 to 24, 24.90% from 25 to 44, 25.30% from 45 to 64, and 17.00% 65 or older. The median age was 40 years. For every 100 females, there were 94.40 males. For every 100 females age 18 and over, there were 90.90 males.

The median household income was $32,463 and the median family income was $37,165. Males had a median income of $27,086 versus $19,720 for females. The per capita income for the county was $15,204. About 9.00% of families and 12.20% of the population were below the poverty line, including 14.80% of those under age 18 and 9.80% of those age 65 or over.

== Politics ==
Callahan County is part of the 71st district for elections to the Texas House of Representatives.

United States presidential election results for Callahan County, Texas
Year	Republican		Democratic		Third party(ies)	
Year	No.	%	No.	%	No.	%
1912	45	5.12%	782	88.96%	52	5.92%
1916	74	6.60%	959	85.55%	88	7.85%
1920	213	17.69%	804	66.78%	187	15.53%
1924	244	12.54%	1,614	82.94%	88	4.52%
1928	979	51.02%	940	48.98%	0	0.00%
1932	152	6.65%	2,133	93.35%	0	0.00%
1936	245	12.31%	1,739	87.34%	7	0.35%
1940	309	11.78%	2,310	88.07%	4	0.15%
1944	224	9.09%	1,962	79.66%	277	11.25%
1948	258	11.67%	1,844	83.40%	109	4.93%
1952	1,431	48.71%	1,502	51.12%	5	0.17%
1956	1,140	48.45%	1,199	50.96%	14	0.59%
1960	1,261	44.43%	1,559	54.93%	18	0.63%
1964	849	27.96%	2,178	71.72%	10	0.33%
1968	921	29.75%	1,437	46.41%	738	23.84%
1972	2,223	75.64%	665	22.63%	51	1.74%
1976	1,581	40.92%	2,241	58.00%	42	1.09%
1980	2,284	52.74%	2,002	46.22%	45	1.04%
1984	3,538	72.69%	1,305	26.81%	24	0.49%
1988	2,887	58.67%	2,017	40.99%	17	0.35%
1992	2,134	40.38%	1,694	32.05%	1,457	27.57%
1996	2,480	52.82%	1,666	35.48%	549	11.69%
2000	3,656	74.67%	1,174	23.98%	66	1.35%
2004	4,542	80.33%	1,073	18.98%	39	0.69%
2008	4,589	80.28%	1,063	18.60%	64	1.12%
2012	4,378	84.24%	751	14.45%	68	1.31%
2016	4,865	87.20%	569	10.20%	145	2.60%
2020	6,012	87.92%	734	10.73%	92	1.35%
2024	6,180	88.44%	761	10.89%	47	0.67%

United States Senate election results for Callahan County, Texas1
Year	Republican		Democratic		Third party(ies)	
Year	No.	%	No.	%	No.	%
2024	5,973	85.62%	863	12.37%	140	2.01%

United States Senate election results for Callahan County, Texas2
Year	Republican		Democratic		Third party(ies)	
Year	No.	%	No.	%	No.	%
2020	5,892	87.69%	680	10.12%	147	2.19%

Texas Gubernatorial election results for Callahan County
Year	Republican		Democratic		Third party(ies)	
Year	No.	%	No.	%	No.	%
2022	4,770	90.58%	444	8.43%	52	0.99%

== Communities ==
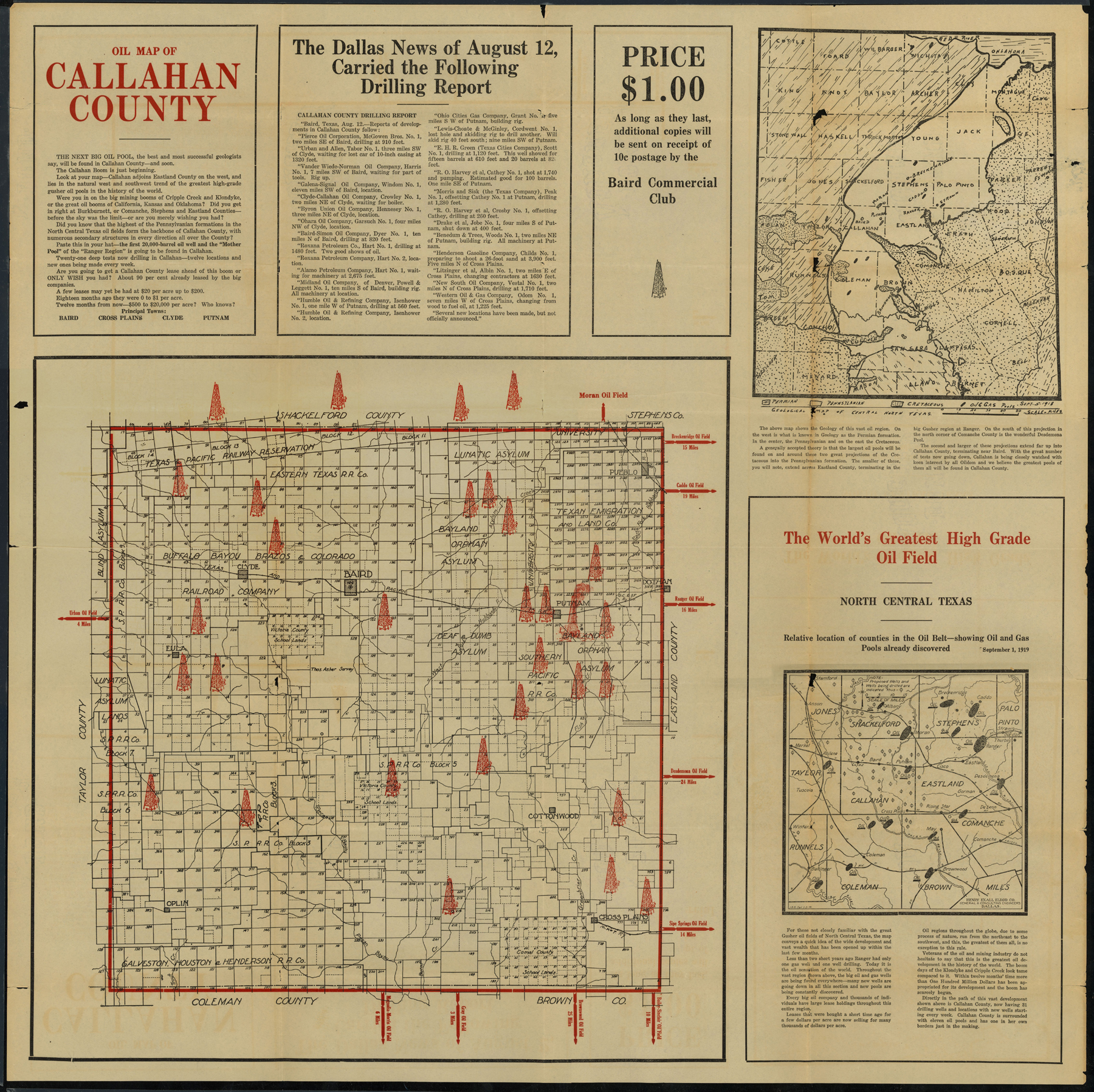
Oil Map of Callahan County, 1919

=== Cities ===
- Baird (county seat)
- Clyde

=== Towns ===
- Cross Plains
- Putnam

=== Unincorporated communities ===
- Atwell
- Cottonwood
- Denton
- Dudley
- Eula
- Oplin
- Pueblo
- Rowden

=== Ghost towns ===
- Admiral
- Belle Plain
- Callahan City

== See also ==
- Robert E. Howard Museum
- List of museums in West Texas
- National Register of Historic Places listings in Callahan County, Texas
- Recorded Texas Historic Landmarks in Callahan County
