= Belle Plain, Texas =

Belle Plain
- Ghost town
- Location within the state of Texas
- Coordinates: 32°18′39″N 99°21′39″W
- Country: United States
- State: Texas
- County: Callahan
- Elevation: 1,847 ft (563 m)
- Time zone: UTC-6 (Central (CST))
  - Summer (DST): UTC-5 (CDT)
- GNIS feature ID: 1377985

Belle Plain is a populated place in Callahan County, Texas, United States.

== History ==
Belle Plain was established in 1875 after Nelson M. Smith purchased land with the intention of founding a college. He laid out a townsite to accompany the school. The origin of the community’s name is not definitively documented, though local tradition holds that it may have been named for Katie Belle Magee, reportedly the first child born at the site. By 1876, the settlement included several businesses and had an estimated population of about sixty‑five residents. When Callahan County was organized in 1877, voters selected Belle Plain as the county seat. A local newspaper began publication in 1879, and by the mid‑1880s the town had developed into a small commercial center with multiple businesses, Belle Plain College, and a population of roughly four hundred.

Belle Plain declined rapidly after railroad construction bypassed the town, a pattern common among frontier communities in Texas during the late nineteenth century. In 1883, the county seat was relocated to Baird, and the stone jail was dismantled and moved there. Belle Plain College continued to operate for several more years before closing in 1892. By the early twentieth century, the town had largely been abandoned, and its post office was discontinued in 1907.
