= Baird, Texas =

- City
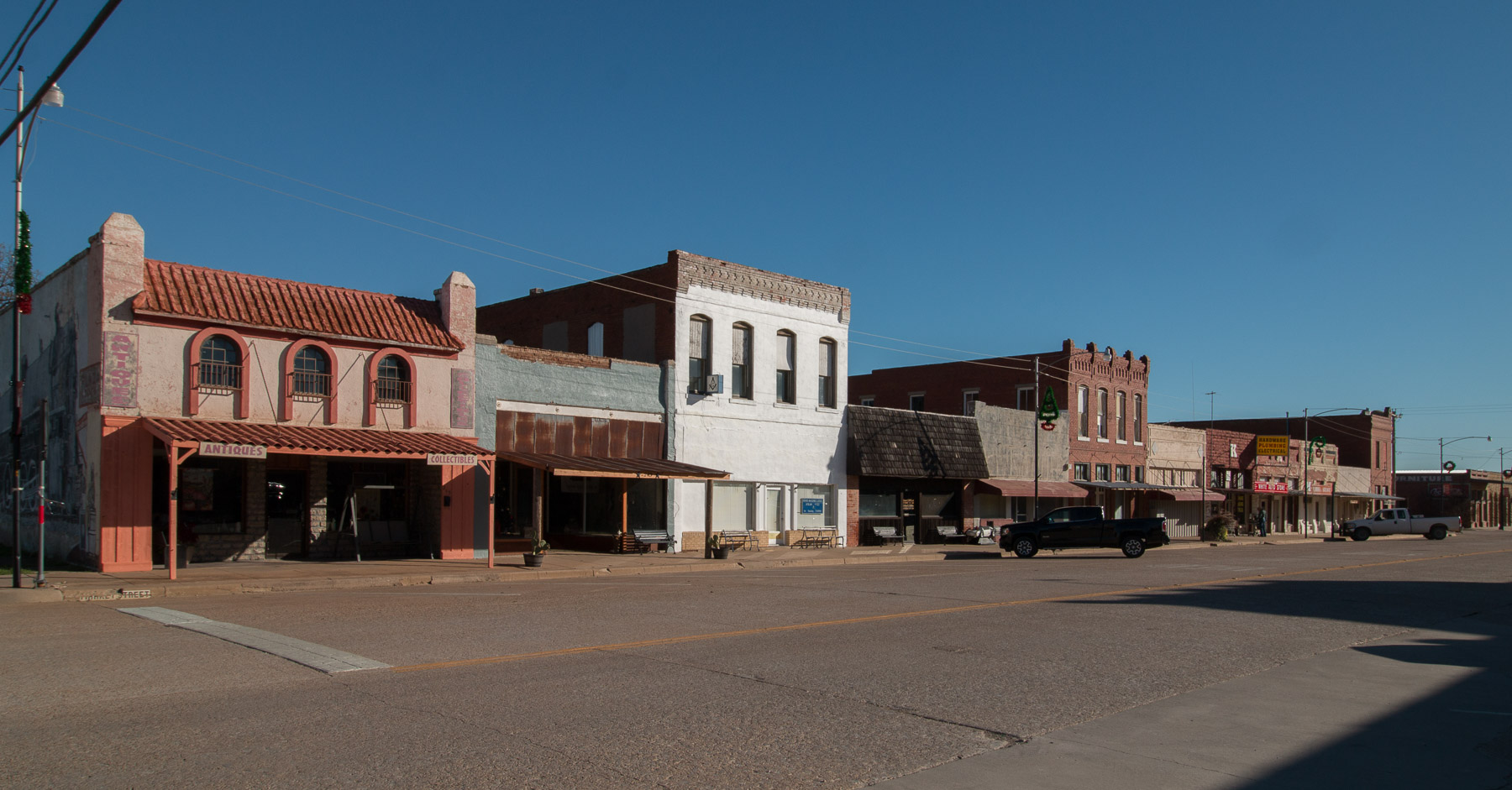
- Baird Main Street
- Interactive map of Baird, Texas
- Coordinates: 32°23′30″N 99°23′20″W
- Country: United States
- State: Texas
- County: Callahan
- Established: 1881

Area
  - Total: 2.73 sq mi (7.06 km^{2})
  - Land: 2.66 sq mi (6.88 km^{2})
  - Water: 0.069 sq mi (0.18 km^{2})
- Elevation: 1,716 ft (523 m)

Population (2020)
  - Total: 1,479
  - Density: 557/sq mi (215/km^{2})
- Time zone: UTC-6 (Central (CST))
  - Summer (DST): UTC-5 (CDT)
- ZIP code: 79504
- Area code: 325
- FIPS code: 48-05336
- GNIS feature ID: 2409771

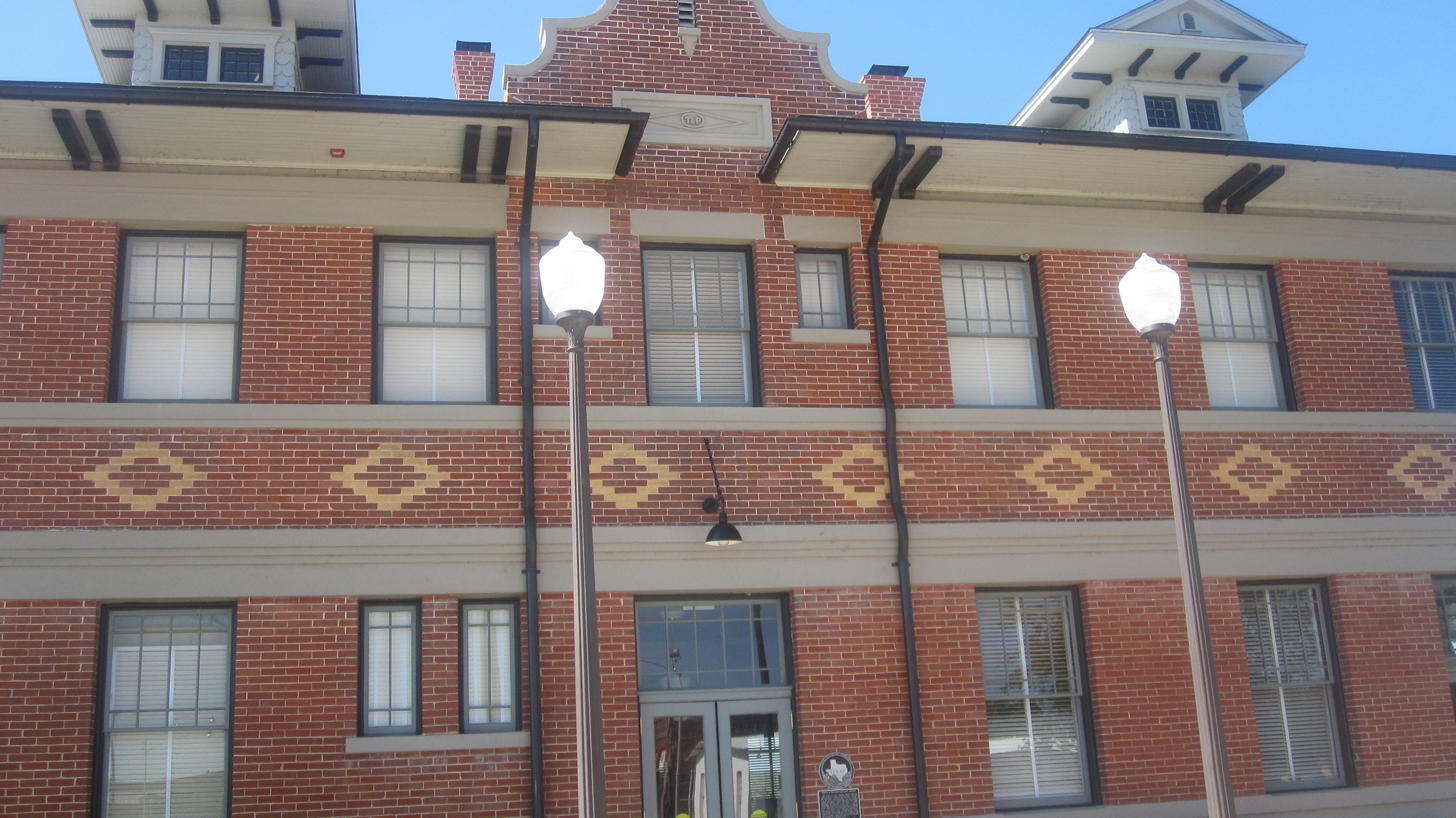
The Texas and Pacific Railway depot serves as a visitor center and transportation museum in Baird.

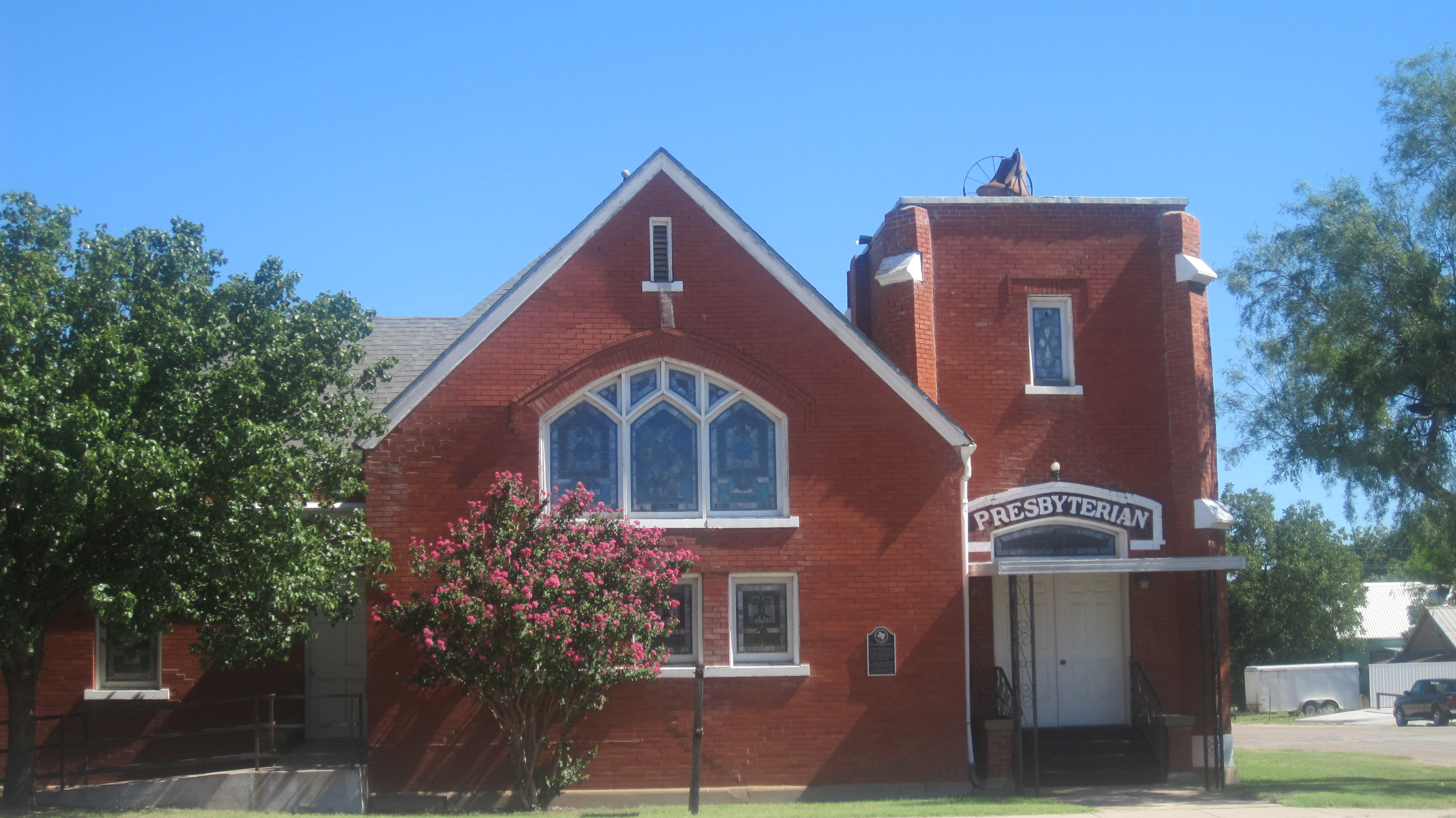
Presbyterian Church in Baird

Baird is a city in and the county seat of Callahan County, Texas, United States. Its population was 1,479 at the 2020 census. The city is named after Matthew Baird, the owner and director of the Texas and Pacific Railway. The railway depot is now operated as the visitor center and a transportation museum.

Baird is part of the Abilene metropolitan area.

== Geography ==
Baird is located in north-central Callahan County. Interstate 20 passes through the northern part of the city, leading west 20 miles (32 km) to Abilene and east 25 miles (40 km) to Cisco. U.S. Route 283 crosses the eastern side of town, leading north 25 miles (40 km) to Albany and south 41 miles (66 km) to Coleman.

According to the United States Census Bureau, the city has a total area of 2.7 square miles (7.1 km^{2}), of which 0.1 square miles (0.2 km^{2}), or 2.55%, is covered by water.

=== Climate ===
The climate in this area is characterized by hot, humid summers and generally mild to cool winters. According to the Köppen climate classification, Baird has a humid subtropical climate, Cfa on climate maps.

== History ==
Baird, Texas was named after Matthew Baird, a director of the Texas and Pacific Railway. He was also sole proprietor of the Baldwin Locomotive Works, the largest locomotive firm in the United States, headquartered in Philadelphia, Pennsylvania.

The city was officially founded in 1880. In 1993, the Texas Legislature designated Baird as the "Antique Capital of West Texas". It has 12 antique shops.

The former Callahan County Jail, at 100 W. 5th Street, was originally located in nearby Belle Plain, then the county seat. When the county seat moved to Baird, the jail was disassembled brick by brick, and reassembled at its current location. Belle Plain lost population and became a ghost town.

The town has five churches, four gas stations/convenience stores, and a feed store.

== Library ==
The Callahan County Library was started in 1937 by the Baird Wednesday Club. The Pioneer Museum was added in 1940. Both are located on the basement floor of the Callahan County Courthouse. The museum features farm and ranch implements, household items, clothing, barbed wire, and documents.

== Demographics ==
Historical population
Census	Pop.	Note	%±
1890	850		—
1900	1,502		76.7%
1910	1,710		13.8%
1920	1,902		11.2%
1930	1,965		3.3%
1940	1,810		−7.9%
1950	1,821		0.6%
1960	1,633		−10.3%
1970	1,538		−5.8%
1980	1,696		10.3%
1990	1,658		−2.2%
2000	1,623		−2.1%
2010	1,496		−7.8%
2020	1,479		−1.1%
U.S. Decennial Census

=== 2020 census ===
As of the 2020 census, Baird had a population of 1,479, 620 households, and 461 families residing in the city. The median age was 43.6 years. 20.9% of residents were under the age of 18 and 23.1% of residents were 65 years of age or older. For every 100 females there were 84.4 males, and for every 100 females age 18 and over there were 81.1 males age 18 and over.

0% of residents lived in urban areas, while 100.0% lived in rural areas.

There were 620 households in Baird, of which 26.6% had children under the age of 18 living in them. Of all households, 40.6% were married-couple households, 18.2% were households with a male householder and no spouse or partner present, and 34.7% were households with a female householder and no spouse or partner present. About 35.0% of all households were made up of individuals and 16.9% had someone living alone who was 65 years of age or older.

There were 731 housing units, of which 15.2% were vacant. Among occupied housing units, 70.8% were owner-occupied and 29.2% were renter-occupied. The homeowner vacancy rate was 2.0% and the rental vacancy rate was 4.2%.

Racial composition as of the 2020 census
Race	Percent
White	87.4%
Black or African American	0.1%
American Indian and Alaska Native	0.3%
Asian	0.7%
Native Hawaiian and Other Pacific Islander	0%
Some other race	2.6%
Two or more races	8.8%
Hispanic or Latino (of any race)	12.9%

=== 2000 census ===
As of the census of 2000, 1,623 people, 677 households, and 429 families were residing in the city. The population density was 619.0 people/sq mi (239.2/km^{2}). The 806 housing units averaged 307.4/sq mi (118.8/km^{2}). The racial makeup of the city was 90.51% White, 0.18% African American, 0.31% Native American, 0.80% Asian orPacific Islander, 7.09% from other races, and 1.11% from two or more races. Hispanics or Latinos of any race were 13.43% of the population.

Of the 677 households, 28.4% had children under 18 living with them, 49.6% were married couples living together, 9.3% had a female householder with no husband present, and 36.6% were not families. About 33.7% of all households were made up of individuals, and 19.8% had someone living alone who was 65 or older. The average household size was 2.32, and the average family size was 2.96.

In the city, theage distribution was 23.4% under 18, 7.3% from 18 to 24, 24.6% from 25 to 44, 24.0% from 45 to 64, and 20.8% who were 65 or older. The median age was 41 years. For every 100 females, there were 93.0 males. For every 100 females age 18 and over, there were 88.9 males.

The median income for a household in the city was $27,446, and for a family was $35,000. Males had a median income of $21,974 versus $16,298 for females. The per capita income for the city was $13,951. About 12.3% of families and 14.0% of the population were below the poverty line, including 18.4% of those under age 18 and 12.5% of those age 65 or over.

== Education ==
The City of Baird is served by the Baird Independent School District, located at 600 West 7th Street. Baird ISD is classified as a 1A district.

== Notable person ==
- Lou Halsell Rodenberger (1926–2009), Texas author who lived much of her later years 12 miles (19 km) southeast of Baird, in the small community of Admiral
